= 23rd Venice International Film Festival =

Italian film festival in 1962

- Location: Venice, Italy
- Founded: 1932
- Awards: Golden Lion: Family Diary and Ivan's Childhood
- Festival date: 25 August – 8 September 1962
- Website: Website

Venice Film Festival chronology
- 24th 22nd

The 23rd annual Venice International Film Festival was held from 25 August to 8 September 1962.

Italian filmmaker Luigi Chiarini was the Jury President for the main competition. The Golden Lion winners were: Family Diary directed by Valerio Zurlini and Ivan's Childhood directed by Andrei Tarkovsky.

A retrospective of the American Twenties is famously linked to this edition.

== Jury ==
- Luigi Chiarini, Italian filmmaker - Jury President
- Guglielmo Biraghi, Italian film critic
- G. B. Cavallaro, Italian producer
- Georges Charensol, French critic
- John Houseman, American actor and producer
- Iosif Kheifits, Soviet filmmaker
- Arturo Lanocita, Italian writer and journalist
- Ronald Neame, British filmmaker and cinematographer
- Hans Schaarwächter, West German journalist

== Official Sections ==
The following films were selected to be screened:

=== Main Competition ===
English title	Original title	Director(s)	Production country
Birdman of Alcatraz		John Frankenheimer	United States
Eva		Joseph Losey	France, Italy
Family Diary	Cronaca familiare	Valerio Zurlini	Italy
Homage at Siesta Time	Homenaje a la hora de la siesta	Leopoldo Torre Nilsson	Argentina
Ivan's Childhood	Ива́ново де́тство	Andrei Tarkovsky	Soviet Union
Lolita		Stanley Kubrick	United Kingdom
The Mad Fox	恋や恋なすな恋	Tomu Uchida	Japan
Mamma Roma		Pier Paolo Pasolini	Italy
Men and Beasts	Люди и звери	Sergei Gerasimov	Soviet Union
Smog		Franco Rossi	Italy
Term of Trial		Peter Glenville	United Kingdom
Thérèse Desqueyroux		Georges Franju	France
The Trial	Le procès	Orson Welles	France, Italy, West Germany
Vivre sa vie		Jean-Luc Godard	France

=== Out of Competition ===
English title	Original title	Director(s)	Production country
West Side Story		Robert Wise, Jerome Robbins	United States

=== Informativa ===
English title	Original title	Director(s)	Production country
Assault on the Pay Train	Assalto ao Trem Pagador	Roberto Farias	Brazil
La Bandida		Roberto Rodríguez	Mexico
Black Fox: The Rise and Fall of Adolf Hitler		Louis Clyde Stoumen	United States
Boom Town	Uzavreli grad	Veljko Bulajic	Yugoslavia
The Bread of Those Early Years	Das Brot der frühen Jahre	Herbert Vesely	West Germany
Cléo from 5 to 7	Cléo de 5 à 7	Agnès Varda	France
David and Lisa		Frank Perry	United States
The Doll	Vaxdockan	Arne Mattsson	Sweden
Dulcinea		Vicente Escrivá	Spain
Electra	Ηλέκτρα	Michalis Kakogiannis	Greece
The Fabulous Baron Munchausen	Baron Prásil	Karel Zeman	Czechoslovakia
Flooded Out	Los inundados	Manuel Antin	Argentina
The Grass-Cutters	草を刈る娘	Katsumi Nishikawa	Japan
The Grim Reaper	La commare secca	Bernardo Bertolucci	Italy
The Houseguest and My Mother	사랑방 손님과 어머니	Shin Sang-ok	South Korea
The Intruder		Roger Corman	United States
Knife in the Water	Nóz w wodzie	Roman Polanski	Poland
Kwiecien		Witold Lesiewicz	Poland
La lunga strada del ritorno		Alessandro Blasetti	Italy
A Man for Burning	Un uomo da bruciare	Valentino Orsini, Paolo and Vittorio Taviani	Italy
Megszállottak		Károly Makk	Hungary
A Milanese Story	Una storia milanese	Eriprando Visconti	Italy
Odd Number	La cifra impar	Manuel Antin	Argentina
Paris, My Love	Parigi o cara	Vittorio Caprioli	Italy
Pitfall	おとし穴	Hiroshi Teshigahara	Japan
The Sea	Il mare	Giuseppe Patroni Griffi	Italy
Sundays and Cybèle	Les dimanches de Ville d'Avray	Serge Bourguignon	France
A Taste of Honey		Tony Richardson	United Kingdom
Third of a Man		Robert Lewin	United States
The Time and the Touch		Benito Alazraki	Mexico, United States
Três Cabras de Lampião		Aurélio Teixeira	Brazil
When Peace Breaks Out	Los que no fuimos a la guerra	Julio Diamante	Spain
The Winner	Un coeur gros comme ça	François Reichenbach	France

== Official Awards ==
- Golden Lion:
  - Family Diary by Valerio Zurlini
  - Ivan's Childhood by Andrei Tarkovsky
- Special Jury Prize: Vivre sa vie by Jean-Luc Godard
- Volpi Cup for Best Actor: Burt Lancaster for Birdman of Alcatraz
- Volpi Cup for Best Actress: Emmanuelle Riva for Thérèse Desqueyroux
- Best First Work:
  - David and Lisa by Frank Perry
  - Los inundados by Fernando Birri

== Independent Awards ==
=== New Cinema Award ===
- A Man for Burning by Valentino Orsini, Paolo Taviani and Vittorio Taviani

=== San Giorgio Prize ===
- Birdman of Alcatraz by John Frankenheimer

=== FIPRESCI Prize ===
- Knife in the Water by Roman Polanski

=== OCIC Award ===
- Term of Trial by Peter Glenville

=== Pasinetti Award ===
- Vivre sa vie by Jean-Luc Godard
  - Parallel Sections: A Man for Burning by Valentino Orsini, Paolo Taviani and Vittorio Taviani

=== Italian Cinema Clubs Award ===
- Mamma Roma by Pier Paolo Pasolini

=== Award of the City of Imola ===
- A Milanese Story by Eriprando Visconti
  - Special Mention: Pelle viva by Giuseppe Fina

=== Award of the City of Venice ===
- Family Diary by Valerio Zurlini

=== Catholic Cinema Clubs Award ===
- Family Diary by Valerio Zurlini

=== Cinema 60 Award ===
- A Man for Burning by Valentino Orsini, Paolo Taviani and VittorioTaviani
