= Janet Landgard =

American actress and model (1947–2023)

- Born: Janet Alice Landgard; December 2, 1947; Pasadena, California, U.S.
- Died: November 6, 2023 (aged 75)
- Occupation: Actress
- Years active: 1963–1974
- Notable work: The Donna Reed Show; The Swimmer

Janet Alice Landgard (December 2, 1947 – November 6, 2023) was an American actress and model.

== Life and career ==
Janet Alice Landgard was born in Pasadena, California, on December 2, 1947.

When Landgard was 14, her grandmother suggested modeling to her. She was seen in commercials on television and on magazine covers. She attended Pasadena High School, but after she obtained a regular role on The Donna Reed Show, she was educated at the studio.

Landgard starred with Burt Lancaster in the 1968 film The Swimmer written by Eleanor Perry and directed by Frank Perry. She also starred in 1970's Land Raiders with Telly Savalas and the 1974 film Moonchild with Victor Buono.

Landgard was interviewed for the behind-the-scenes documentary directed by Chris Innis, The Story of the Swimmer, which was featured on the 2014 Grindhouse Releasing/Box Office Spectaculars Blu-ray/DVD restoration of The Swimmer.

== Death ==
Landgard died of brain cancer on November 6, 2023, less than a month before her 76th birthday.

== Filmography ==
Title	Year	Role	Notes
The Donna Reed Show	1963–1965	Various (Karen, Sabrina, etc.)	12 episodes
My Three Sons	1963	Georgia Fleck	Episode: "The Proposals"
The Swimmer	1968	Julianne Hooper	Dir. Frank Perry
Land Raiders	1970	Kate Mayfield	
Deadly Dream	1971	Betty	TV movie
Moonchild	1974	Girl	Final film role
The Story of the Swimmer	2014	Herself	Behind-the-scenes documentary about the making of The Swimmer
