= Ted Zachary =

American film producer

- Occupations: Film producer, Film studio executive

Ted Zachary is an American assistant director, production manager, film producer and seasoned movie studio executive known for his sense of humor and his fairness. From the 1970s through the 2000s, Zachary worked as an executive for Viacom, MGM/UA and New Line Cinema as well as having been an assistant director on notable films such as Bob Fosse's Lenny, Shaft and Frank Perry's The Swimmer.

== Career highlights ==
Zachary started his career working his way up as an assistant film director and production manager based out of New York City / New Jersey, and worked on films such as Frank Perry's The Swimmer, Shaft, Bob Fosse's Lenny and The Gambler as well as having produced nearly a thousand television commercials, including the legendary Coca-Cola "Hilltop" commercial featuring the song "I'd Like to Teach the World to Sing." From 1977 through 1982 he was Vice President and Executive in Charge of Production at Viacom Enterprises, followed by four years as Senior Vice President of Television production for MGM/UA. While at MGM/UA, Zachary supervised production for all television series, pilots and telefilms, including the popular television series CHiPs and Fame.

In 1985 he went on to become the Senior Vice President of Production at Tri-Star Pictures where he oversaw films such as Look Who's Talking, Peggy Sue Got Married, The Freshman and Steel Magnolias, a position he held for four years. 1991 saw Zachary executive produce the Gene Wilder/Richard Pryor film, Another You. In 1992, Zachary joined Reeves Entertainment as the Senior Vice President of Production where he oversaw television series including Barry Levinson's Homicide: Life on the Street Zachary moved on to become the Executive Vice President of Production, production administration for New Line Cinema, where he was part of the team who oversaw some of the most successful films of the company's history, such as Dumb and Dumber, David Fincher's Se7en, and several films featuring Marlon Brando including Don Juan DeMarco. In 1998, Zachary executive produced Dance with Me, starring Vanessa L. Williams.

Zachary appears in the behind-the-scenes documentary about the making of The Swimmer, entitled The Story of The Swimmer by Chris Innis. In the documentary (featured on the 2014 Grindhouse Releasing/Box Office Spectaculars Blu-ray/DVD restoration of the film) Zachary and fellow assistant director Michael Hertzberg detail what it was like to work with Burt Lancaster and director Frank Perry during the film's production.

== Selected filmography ==
- Jack of Diamonds (1967) (second assistant director)
- The Swimmer (1968) (second assistant director)
- Loving (1970) (assistant director)
- Shaft (1971) (assistant director)
- The Hot Rock (1972) (assistant director)
- Shamus (1973) (assistant director)
- The Seven-Ups (1973) (assistant director)
- The Connection (TV Movie) (1973) (production supervisor)
- The Gambler (1974) (assistant director)
- The Happy Hooker (1975) (first assistant director)
- Stickin' Together (TV Movie) (1978) (executive in charge of production))
- The Lazarus Syndrome (TV Movie) (1978) (executive in charge of production)
- To Race the Wind (1980) (TV Movie) (executive in charge of production)
- All God's Children (1980) (TV Movie) (executive in charge of production)
- Enola Gay: The Men, the Mission, the Atomic Bomb (1980) (TV movie) (co-producer)
- CHiPs (TV series) (1982–1983) (executive in charge of production)
- I Want to Live (TV Movie) (1984) (executive in charge of production)
- Paper Dolls (TV Series) (1984) (executive in charge of production)
- Fame (TV Series) (1982–1985) (executive in charge of production)
- Lenny (1984) (first assistant director) – directed by Bob Fosse
- The Defiant Ones (1986) (TV Movie) (executive in charge of production)
- About Last Night (1986) (executive in charge of production)
- Night of the Creeps (1986) (executive in charge of production)
- Peggy Sue Got Married (1986) (executive in charge of production)
- No Mercy (1986) (executive in charge of production)
- Gardens of Stone (1987) (executive in charge of production)
- Who's Harry Crumb? (1989) (executive in charge of production)
- See No Evil, Hear No Evil (1989) (executive in charge of production)
- Blind Fury (1989) (executive in charge of production)
- Look Who's Talking (1989) (executive in charge of production)
- Steel Magnolias (1989) (executive in charge of production)
- Glory (1989) (executive in charge of production)
- I Love You to Death (1990) (executive in charge of production)
- The Freshman (1990) (executive in charge of production)
- Another You (1991) (executive producer)
- Homicide: Life on the Street (1993–1994) (TV series) (executive in charge of production)
- Don Juan DeMarco (1994) (executive in charge of production)
- Dumb and Dumber (1994) (executive in charge of production)
- Friday (1994) (executive in charge of production)
- Mortal Kombat (1995) (executive in charge of production)
- Se7en (1995) (executive in charge of production)
- Feeling Minnesota (1995) (executive in charge of production)
- Last Man Standing (1995) (executive in charge of production)
- The Island of Dr. Moreau (1996) (executive in charge in production)
- Dance with Me (1998) (executive producer)
- Geppetto (2000) (TV musical) (unit production manager/producer)
- The Story of the Swimmer (2014) (as himself) (documentary)
