= Alexa Kenin =

American actress (1962–1985)

- Born: Alexa Jordan Kenin; February 16, 1962; New York City, U.S.
- Died: September 10, 1985 (aged 23); New York City, U.S.
- Resting place: New Montefiore Cemetery
- Occupation: Actress
- Years active: 1972–1985

Alexa Jordan Kenin (February 16, 1962 – September 10, 1985) was an American actress. She is known for her supporting roles in several films released during the 1980s, including: Little Darlings (1980); Honkytonk Man (1982); and Pretty in Pink (1986), which was released after her death and dedicated to her memory.

== Career ==
Kenin was born in New York City. Her parents divorced when she was young and her mother, actress Maya Kenin, married character actor John P. Ryan. Kenin began acting as a child and won her first professional part with a supporting role in the 1972 holiday TV special The House Without a Christmas Tree, which starred Jason Robards and Lisa Lucas.

In 1977, Kenin appeared in John Guare's Landscape of the Body at The Public Theater and in the off-Broadway production of Elusive Angel. The following year she played David Janssen's daughter in the television miniseries The Word. In December 1980, she portrayed the role of "Libby" in the touring production of Neil Simon's I Ought to Be in Pictures, starring Bill Macy and Patricia Harty. She also guest starred in several episodes of ABC Afterschool Special, and in the 1982 TV film A Piano for Mrs. Cimino opposite Bette Davis.

At the age of 17, Kenin and her mother moved to Los Angeles after her mother divorced John Ryan. Kenin attended Beverly Hills High School while also maintaining her acting career. In 1979, she was cast in the CBS sitcom Co-Ed Fever. The series was canceled after one episode. The following year, she co-starred in the teen comedy Little Darlings, starring Kristy McNichol and Tatum O'Neal.

In 1982, Kenin guest-starred on episodes of The Facts of Life and Gimme a Break!. In the same year she played, in Honkytonk Man, the part of an aspiring young singer alongside Clint Eastwood as he makes his way to Nashville. One of Kenin's final roles was in the John Hughes film Pretty in Pink (1986), released after her death.

== Death ==
On September 10, 1985, at the age of 23, Kenin was found dead in her Manhattan apartment. Her cause of death has never been publicly revealed. She is buried in New Montefiore Cemetery in West Babylon, New York.

== Filmography ==
Year	Title	Role	Notes
1972	The House Without a Christmas Tree	Carla Mae	Television film
1976–1982	ABC Afterschool Special	Various roles	5 episodes
1977	Special Treat		Episode: "A Piece of Cake"
1977	Off Campus	Alexis	Television film
1978	The Word	Judy Randall	Television miniseries
1979	Co-Ed Fever	Mouse	6 episodes
1980	Little Darlings	Dana	
1980	A Perfect Match	Angel	Television film
1981	Word of Honor	Beverly	Television film
1981	Too Close for Comfort	Ethel Kadinsky	Episode: "Who's Sara Now?"
1982	A Piano for Mrs. Cimino	Karen Cimino	Television film
1982	The Facts of Life	Jesse	Episode: "New York, New York"
1982	Amy & the Angel	Janet Mixner	Television film
1982	Gimme a Break!	C.C.	Episode: "Hot Muffins"
1982	Honkytonk Man	Marlene	
1983	The Mississippi	Francie	Episode: "Edge of the River"
1983	Princess Daisy	Kiki Kavanaugh	Television miniseries
1986	Pretty in Pink	Jena Hoeman	Released posthumously
1989	Animal Behavior	Sheila Sandusky	Released posthumously
