= Trilogy (film) =

1969 film

- Film poster
- Directed by: Frank Perry
- Written by: Truman Capote; Eleanor Perry
- Produced by: Frank Perry
- Starring: Martin Balsam; Maureen Stapleton; Mildred Natwick; Geraldine Page
- Narrated by: Truman Capote
- Cinematography: Harry Sundby; Jordan Cronenweth; Conrad L. Hall; Joseph C. Brun
- Edited by: Sheila Bakerman
- Music by: Meyer Kupferman
- Production company: Francis Productions
- Distributed by: Allied Artists
- Release date: 1969
- Running time: 100 minutes
- Country: United States
- Language: English

Trilogy (also released as Truman Capote's Trilogy) is a 1969 American anthology drama film directed by Frank Perry and written by Truman Capote. It was listed to compete at the 1968 Cannes Film Festival, but the festival was cancelled due to the events of May 1968 in France.

Capote co-wrote the script with Eleanor Perry. It includes an adaptation of one of Capote's most well-known short stories, "A Christmas Memory," which Capote narrates. The ensemble cast includes Martin Balsam, Mildred Natwick, Geraldine Page and Maureen Stapleton.

== Plot ==
=== Miriam ===
The first story, "Miriam," is about a former governess, Miss Miriam Miller, who is aging, lonely and no longer able to find work. One day, at a New York movie theater, she encounters a young girl, also named Miriam, who then repeatedly turns up uninvited at Miss Miller's apartment, angrily smashing a vase and going through the older lady's jewelry case, asking if she can keep a valuable brooch. Miss Miller goes to neighbors, telling them of a girl who refuses to leave her alone. A quarrel develops, during which Miss Miller accidentally pushes the girl through an open window. But when she enters the next room, Miriam is still there, and it becomes apparent Miss Miller could be a victim of her own delusions and imagination.

Cast

- Mildred Natwick as Ms. Miriam Miller
- Susan Dunfee as Miriam
- Beverly Ballard as Nina
- Jane Connell as Mrs. Connolly
- Carol Gustafson as Ms. Lake
- Richard Hamilton as Man in Automat

=== Among the Paths to Eden ===
The second story, "Among the Paths to Eden," takes place in Calvary Cemetery. Ivor Belli is visiting his wife's grave at Calvary Cemetery at 49-02 Laurel Hill Blvd, Woodside, NY 11377 when a lonely spinster, Mary O'Meaghen, strikes up a conversation. They share an appreciation for singer Helen Morgan and memories of their past lives. Mary then invites Ivor to dinner, but he declines. As he leaves Calvary Cemetery, Mary then follows another lonely man to try to converse with him, and persuade him to marry her.

Cast

- Martin Balsam as Ivor Belli
- Maureen Stapleton as Mary O'Meaghan

=== A Christmas Memory ===
The final story, "A Christmas Memory," concerns a young boy named Buddy and the tender recollections he has of a poor childhood and the holidays he spent with two aunts and Sook, a considerably older, beloved female cousin. After wrapping fruitcakes as gifts and chopping down a tree, Buddy and Sook spend a last Christmas together, opening gifts and flying kites together, before Buddy's departure from home to attend a military school. Melancholy overwhelms him at the memory of Sook's passing and how they never saw each other again.

Cast

- Truman Capote as the Narrator (voice)
- Geraldine Page as Sook
- Donnie Melvin as Buddy

== Reception ==
Howard Thompson of The New York Times was impressed: "...[The film] quietly says and conveys more about the human heart and spirit than most of today's free-wheeling blastaways on the screen. Delicately, it towers." Geraldine Page would go on to win both the National Board of Review Award for Best Actress at the National Board of Review Awards 1969, as well as the Primetime Emmy Award for Outstanding Single Performance by an Actress in a Leading Role in a Drama, for her turn in the production at the 21st Primetime Emmy Awards since "The Christmas Memory" segment aired as an episode of ABC Stage 67 in 1967. The telecast also won a Peabody Award. Director Frank Perry was nominated for the Golden Spike prize at the Valladolid International Film Festival.
