= Mildred Natwick =

American actress (1905–1994)

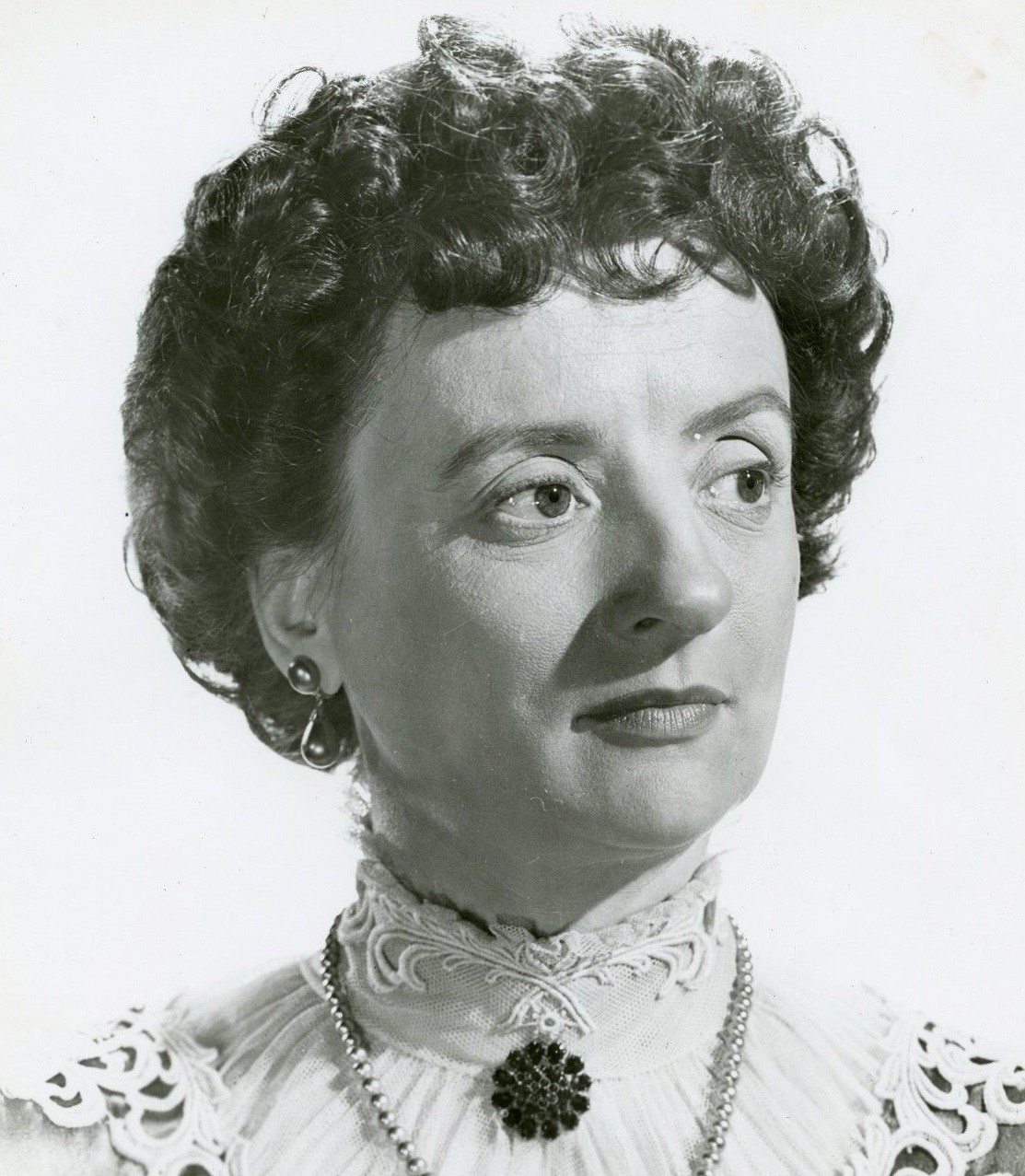
- Natwick in 1947
- Born: June 19, 1905; Baltimore, Maryland, U.S.
- Died: October 25, 1994 (aged 89); Manhattan, New York City, U.S.
- Resting place: Lorraine Park Cemetery, Baltimore, Maryland, U.S.
- Education: Bennett College
- Occupation: Actress
- Years active: 1932–1988
- Relatives: Grim Natwick (first cousin)

Mildred Natwick (June 19, 1905 – October 25, 1994) was an American actress. She won a Primetime Emmy Award and was nominated for an Academy Award and two Tony Awards.

== Early life ==
Mildred Natwick was born on June 19, 1905, in Baltimore, Maryland, the daughter of Mildred Marion (née Dawes) and Joseph Natwick of Wisconsin. Her father was a sawmill baron and dairy farmer who owned Dunloggin Dairy Farm. He established the farm on land that was cleared of its white oaks; the community of Dunloggin in Ellicott City, Maryland, was so named because Natwick was "done logging" the land. Her grandfather, Ole Natwick, was one of the earliest Norwegian immigrants to the United States, arriving in Wisconsin in 1847. Her first cousin was animator and cartoonist Grim Natwick. Natwick attended the Bryn Mawr School in Baltimore and later graduated from Bennett College.

== Career ==
Natwick began performing on the stage at age 21 with "The Vagabonds", a non-professional theatre group in Baltimore. She soon joined the University Players on Cape Cod. Natwick made her Broadway debut in 1932 playing Mrs. Noble in Frank McGrath's play Carry Nation, about the famous temperance crusader Carrie Nation. Throughout the 1930s she starred in a number of plays, frequently collaborating with friend and actor-director-playwright Joshua Logan. On Broadway, she played "Prossy" in Katharine Cornell's production of Candida. She made her film debut in John Ford's The Long Voyage Home as a Cockney slattern, and portrayed the landlady in The Enchanted Cottage (1945).

Natwick is remembered for small but memorable roles in several John Ford film classics, including 3 Godfathers (1948), She Wore a Yellow Ribbon (1949), and The Quiet Man (1952). She played Miss Ivy Gravely, in Alfred Hitchcock's The Trouble with Harry (1955), and a sorceress in The Court Jester (1956).

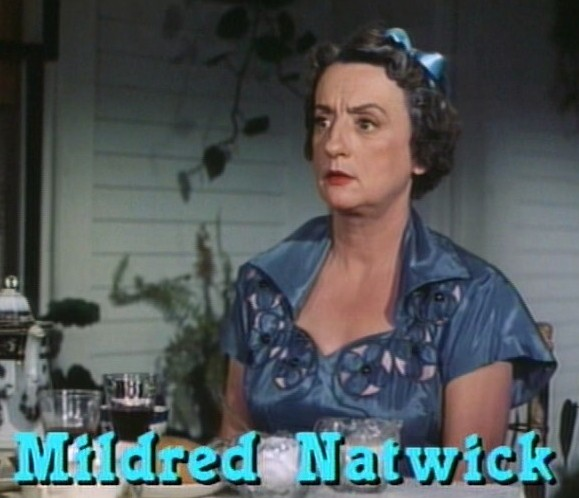
Natwick in the film The Trouble with Harry (1955)

She continued to appear onstage, and made regular guest appearances in television series. On May 30, 1950, she starred in "Listen, Listen" on Suspense.

She was twice nominated for Tony Awards: in 1957 for The Waltz of the Toreadors, the same year she also starred in Tammy and the Bachelor with Debbie Reynolds and Leslie Nielsen and in 1972 for the musical 70 Girls 70. She returned to film in Barefoot in the Park (1967) as the mother of the character played by Jane Fonda. The role earned Natwick her only Academy Award nomination for Best Supporting actress. One of Natwick's memorable roles was in The House Without a Christmas Tree (1972), which starred Jason Robards and Lisa Lucas. The program's success spawned three sequels: The Thanksgiving Treasure, The Easter Promise, and Addie and The King of Hearts.

In 1971, Natwick co-starred with Helen Hayes in the ABC Movie of the Week, Do Not Fold, Spindle, or Mutilate, in which their characters worked together as amateur sleuths. The success of that telefilm resulted in a similar team-up the next year, portraying two mystery-writing and solving sisters; this spawned the 1973-74 series The Snoop Sisters, which was part of The NBC Wednesday Mystery Movie. For her performance, Natwick won the Primetime Emmy Award for Outstanding Lead Actress in a Miniseries or a Movie. In 1981, Natwick joined Hayes as the first members of the Board of Advisors to the Riverside Shakespeare Company. Both attended and supported several fund raisers for that off-Broadway theatre company.

She guest-starred on such television series as McMillan & Wife, Family, Alice, The Love Boat, Hawaii Five-O, The Bob Newhart Show and Murder, She Wrote. She made her final film appearance at age 83 in the historical drama Dangerous Liaisons (1988).

== Personal life and death ==
Natwick, who never married or had children, lived in a duplex on Park Avenue in Manhattan for the majority of her life. She was a devout Christian Scientist.

On October 25, 1994, Natwick died of cancer at her home in Manhattan at age 89. She is interred at Lorraine Park Cemetery in Baltimore.

== Broadway credits ==
Date	Production	Role	Notes
October 29 – November 1932	Carry Nation	Mrs. Noble	
September 27 – October 1933	Amourette	Drusilla Thorpe	
October 24 – November 1933	Spring in Autumn	Pura	
February 1 – May 1934	The Wind and the Rain	Mrs. McFie	
September 25, 1934 – February 1935	The Distaff Side	Mrs. Venables	
November 7 – November 1935	Mrs. Venables	May Beringer	
February 17, 1936 – June 1936	End of Summer	Mrs. Wyle	
September 1 – November 1, 1936	Love from a Stranger	Ethel	
March 10 – May 8, 1937	Candida	Miss Proserpine Garnett	
September 29, 1937 – April 1938	The Star-Wagon	Mrs. Rutledge	
September 19 – October 1938	Missouri Legend	The Widow Weeks	
February 9 – May 27, 1939	Stars In Your Eyes	Bess	
December 27–30, 1939	Christmas Eve	Mother McGlory	
January 2–4, 1941	The Lady Who Came to Stay	Milly	
November 5, 1941 – June 5, 1943	Blithe Spirit	Madame Arcati	
April 27 – May 31, 1942	Candida	Miss Proserpine Garnett	Revival
September 6 – October 2, 1943	Blithe Spirit	Madame Arcati	
April 3 – May 2, 1946	Candida	Miss Proserpine Garnett	Revival
October 26, 1946 – January 4, 1947	The Playboy of the Western World	Widow Quin	
March 27 – April 26, 1952	The Grass Harp	Dolly Talbo	
January 17 – May 11, 1957	The Waltz of the Toreadors	Mme. St. Pé	Nominated—Tony Award for Best Featured Actress in a Play
February 20–22, 1958	The Day the Money Stopped	Kathie Morrow	
April 30 – May 31, 1958	The Firstborn	Miriam	
March 2–19, 1960	The Good Soup	Marie-Paule and Armand's Mother, Angele	
December 14, 1960 – May 27, 1961	Critic's Choice	Charlotte Orr	
October 23, 1963 - June 25, 1967	Barefoot in the Park	Mrs. Banks	
November 27 – December 27, 1969	Our Town	Mrs. Gibbs	
April 15 – May 15, 1971	70, Girls, 70	Ida Dodd	Nominated—Tony Award for Best Leading Actress in a Musical
March 29 – November 24, 1979	Bedroom Farce	Delia	Replacement

== Filmography ==
Year	Title	Role	Notes
1940	The Long Voyage Home	Freda	
1945	The Enchanted Cottage	Mrs. Abigail Minnett	
1945	Yolanda and the Thief	Aunt Amarilla	
1947	The Late George Apley	Amelia Newcombe	
1948	A Woman's Vengeance	Nurse Caroline Braddock	
1948	The Kissing Bandit	Isabella	
1948	3 Godfathers	The Mother	
1949	She Wore a Yellow Ribbon	Abby Allshard	
1950	Cheaper by the Dozen	Mrs. Mebane	
1952	The Quiet Man	The Widow Sarah Tillane	
1952	Against All Flags	Molvina MacGregor	
1955	The Trouble with Harry	Miss Ivy Gravely	
1955	The Court Jester	Griselda	
1956	Teenage Rebel	Grace Hewitt	
1957	Tammy and the Bachelor	Aunt Renie	
1967	Barefoot in the Park	Ethel Banks	Nominated—Academy Award for Best Supporting Actress
1969	If It's Tuesday, This Must Be Belgium	Jenny Grant	
1969	The Maltese Bippy	Molly Fletcher	
1969	Trilogy	Miss Miller	Segment: "Miriam"
1974	Daisy Miller	Mrs. Costello	
1975	At Long Last Love	Mabel Pritchard	
1982	Kiss Me Goodbye	Mrs. Reilly	
1988	Dangerous Liaisons	Madame de Rosemonde	Final film role

== Partial television credits ==
Year	Title	Role	Notes
1949	Starring Boris Karloff		Episode: "Five Golden Guineas"
1950	Starlight Theatre		2 episodes
1950	Somerset Maugham TV Theatre	Mrs. Albert Forrester	Episode: "The Creative Impulse"
1953	Lux Video Theatre	Mrs. Boyd	Episode: "The Brooch"
1954	You Are There	Mary, Queen of Scots	Episode: "The Execution of Mary, Queen of Scots"
1956	Ford Star Jubilee	Madame Arcati	Episode: "Blithe Spirit"
1956	Alfred Hitchcock Presents	Aunt Rosalie Tallendier	Season 1 Episode 24: "The Perfect Murder"
1958	Alfred Hitchcock Presents	Millicent Bracegirdle	Season 3 Episode 18: "Miss Bracegirdle Does Her Duty"
1961	Naked City	Irma Mahoney	Episode: "Take and Put"
1962	Arsenic & Old Lace	Martha Brewster	TV movie
1969	Bonanza	Mrs. Wharton	Episode: "Mrs. Wharton and the Lesser Breeds"
1971	The Most Deadly Game	Janet McLeod	Episode: "I, Said the Sparrow"
1971	Do Not Fold, Spindle or Mutilate	Shelby Saunders	ABC Movie of the Week
1972	The House Without a Christmas Tree	Grandma Mills	TV movie
1973	Money to Burn	Emily Finnegan	ABC Movie of the Week
1973	The Thanksgiving Treasure	Grandma Mills	TV movie
1973–1974	The Snoop Sisters	Gwendolyn Snoop Nicholson	4 episodes
1975	McMillan & Wife	Beatrice McMillan	2 episodes
1976	Family	Hattie	Episode: "A Right and Proper Goodbye"
1977	The Bob Newhart Show	Grace Dubois	Episode: "A Girl in Her Twenties"
1978–1979	Hawaii Five-O	Millicent Shand	2 episodes
1978	Little Women	Aunt Kathryn March	TV miniseries
1980	Alice	Aunt Agatha	Episode: "Vera's Aunt Agatha"
1981	Trapper John, M.D.	Grandma	Episode: "Is There a Doctor in the Big House?"
1982	Maid in America	Mrs. Angstrom	TV movie
1983	Magnum, P.I.	Madge LaSalle	Episode: "Limited Engagement"
1985	Hardcastle and McCormick	May Hardcastle	Episode: "Hardcastle, Hardcastle, Hardcastle and McCormick"
1986	Murder, She Wrote	Carrie McKittrick	Episode: "Murder in the Electric Cathedral "
1987	Deadly Deception	Sarah Cleason	TV movie

== Awards and nominations ==
Year	Award	Category	Nominated work	Result
1957	Primetime Emmy Awards	Best Supporting Performance by an Actress	Blithe Spirit	Nominated
1957	Tony Awards	Best Featured Actress in a Play	The Waltz of the Toreadors	Nominated
1972	Tony Awards	Best Actress in a Musical	70, Girls, 70	Nominated
1968	Academy Awards	Best Supporting Actress	Barefoot in the Park	Nominated
1968	Laurel Awards	Best Female Supporting Performance	Barefoot in the Park	Nominated
1974	Primetime Emmy Awards	Best Lead Actress in a Limited Series	The Snoop Sisters	Won
