= Family Diary =

- Directed by: Valerio Zurlini
- Written by: Mario Missiroli
- Produced by: Goffredo Lombardo
- Starring: Marcello Mastroianni; Jacques Perrin; Sylvie; Valeria Ciangottini; Salvo Randone
- Cinematography: Giuseppe Rotunno
- Edited by: Mario Serandrei
- Music by: Goffredo Petrassi
- Distributed by: Titanus; Metro Goldwyn Mayer
- Release dates: September 1962 (premiere at VFF); 11 November 1963 (New York City); 8 December 1963 (United States)
- Running time: 115 minutes
- Country: Italy
- Language: Italian

Family Diary (Italian: Cronaca familiare) is a 1962 Italian film directed by Valerio Zurlini and is based on the novel of the same name by Vasco Pratolini. Enrico, played by Marcello Mastroianni, is a struggling artist in 1945 Rome who recently lost his brother, Lorenzo (played by Jacques Perrin). Enrico recalls their tumultuous relationship and examines grief, existentialism, and the importance of familial ties.

Family Diary is an adaptation of the 1947 semi-autobiographical novel by Vasco Pratolini, Cronaca familiare, or, in English, Two Brothers.

The film was awarded with the Golden Lion at the 1962 Venice International Film Festival and it has been acclaimed as one of Zurlini's greatest achievements.

== Plot ==
Marcello Mastroianni plays Enrico, a struggling journalist in 1945 Rome. He receives a phone call informing him that his younger brother Lorenzo (Jacques Perrin) has died. Enrico recalls their long and difficult relationship. Enrico was raised by their poor but warm-hearted grandmother (Sylvie), while Lorenzo was raised as a gentleman by a wealthy local aristocrat. Reunited in the Florence of the 1930s, Enrico becomes his spoiled brother's keeper, forever haunted by a sense of guilt and responsibility towards a man he both hates and loves.

== Cast ==
- Marcello Mastroianni - Enrico
- Jacques Perrin - Lorenzo
- Sylvie - Grandmother
- Salvo Randone - Salocchi
- Valeria Ciangottini - Enzina
- Serena Vergano - Hospital Nun
- Marco Guglielmi
- Franca Pasut
- Miranda Campa
- Nino Fuscagni
- Marcella Valeri
