= David and Lisa =

1962 American drama film directed by Frank Perry

- Theatrical release poster
- Directed by: Frank Perry
- Screenplay by: Eleanor Perry
- Based on: Lisa and David by Theodore Isaac Rubin
- Produced by: Paul M. Heller
- Starring: Keir Dullea; Janet Margolin; Howard Da Silva
- Cinematography: Leonard Hirschfield
- Edited by: Irving Oshman
- Music by: Mark Lawrence
- Production company: Vision Associates Productions
- Distributed by: Continental Distributing
- Release date: December 26, 1962
- Running time: 93 minutes
- Country: United States
- Language: English
- Budget: $183,000
- Box office: $2.3 million (rentals)

David and Lisa is a 1962 American drama film directed by Frank Perry. It is based on the second story in the two-in-one novellas Jordi/Lisa and David by Theodore Isaac Rubin; the screenplay, written by Frank Perry's wife Eleanor Perry (née Rosenfeld), tells the story of David Clemens, a bright young man suffering from a mental illness which, among other symptoms, has instilled in him a fear of being touched. This lands him in a residential treatment center, where he meets Lisa Brandt, a similarly ill young woman who displays a split personality.

The film earned Frank Perry a nomination for the 1963 Academy Award for Best Director and one for Eleanor Perry for her screenplay. The film was adapted into a stage play in 1967 and a made-for-television film in 1998.

== Plot ==
David Clemens is brought to a residential psychiatric treatment center by his apparently caring mother. He becomes very upset when one of the residents brushes his hand, as he believes that being touched can kill him. Cold and distant, he mainly concentrates on his studies, especially that of clocks, with which he appears to be obsessed. It is later revealed that he has a recurring dream in which he murders people by means of a giant clock.

He meets Lisa Brandt, a girl who has two personalities: one of them, Lisa, can only speak in rhymes, while the other, Muriel, cannot speak, but can only write. David befriends her by talking to her in rhymes. Over time, he begins to open up to his psychiatrist, Dr. Alan Swinford, and also becomes friendly with another resident, Simon, which provokes Lisa's jealousy. Following an argument when his mother visits, David's parents decide that he should leave the place. He returns to his parents' house, but after a short time, runs away to the treatment center, where he is allowed to stay.

One day Lisa realizes that she is both Lisa and Muriel and that they are the same person. After this breakthrough, she seeks out David, but he is busy listening to Simon play a Johann Sebastian Bach piece on the piano. Lisa turns on the metronome, interrupting Simon's playing and provoking David's anger. Then, Lisa runs away from the center and takes the train into Center City, Philadelphia, unnoticed. David and the staff fruitlessly search for her until the next morning, when David realizes that she might have returned to the Philadelphia Museum of Art, where she had once embraced a statue of a mother and child.

David and Dr. Swinford rush to the museum, where David finds Lisa on the museum steps. Upon seeing David, Lisa appears to be cured and speaks to him in prose. David, overcoming his own fear of touch for the first time, asks her to hold his hand, while they walk down the stairs to go on their return trip.

== Cast ==
- Keir Dullea as David Clemens
- Janet Margolin as Lisa Brandt
- Howard Da Silva as Dr. Alan Swinford
- Neva Patterson as Mrs. Clemens
- Richard McMurray as Stewart Clemens
- Clifton James as John
- Nancy Nutter as Maureen
- Matthew Anden as Simon
- Jamie Sanchez as Carlos
- Coni Hudak as Kate
- Karen Lynn Gorney as Josette
- Janet Lee Parker as Sandra
- Frank Perry as Newsdealer (uncredited)

This was the film debut of both Janet Margolin and Karen Gorney (who, billed as Karen Lynn Gorney, later became well known for her leading role in Saturday Night Fever in 1977).

== Production ==
In 1961, Ann Perry read the novella by Theodore Isaac Rubin and showed it to her mother Eleanor. The playwright was so fascinated by what she read that she set out to write a screenplay, enlisting her husband Frank as director. The resulting film was produced with small investors and a collection of unknowns to keep costs down. Production began in June 1962 in Wynnewood, Pennsylvania. Only after a run on the festival circuit did the film receive a willing exhibitor from New York.

== Reception ==
David and Lisa has received positive reviews from critics. Review aggregator website Rotten Tomatoes reports that 85% of 13 reviews were positive, with an average rating of 6.9/10. Perry estimated (in 1987) the film made roughly $25 million.

Bosley Crowther of The New York Times described the film as "commendable" and "sympathetic," finding the "vague and elusive" explanation of the characters' ills to be "one of the stumbling blocks in this film," but praising Keir Dullea and Janet Margolin, whose portrayal of the protagonists' "growing curiosity and attachment in the midst of a cheerless institute" is "touchingly presented."

French director Jean Renoir called David and Lisa "a turning point in world cinema."

=== Awards and nominations ===
Award	Category	Nominee(s)	Result
Academy Awards	Best Director	Frank Perry	Nominated
Academy Awards	Best Screenplay – Based on Material from Another Medium	Eleanor Perry	Nominated
British Academy Film Awards	Best Film from any Source		Nominated
British Academy Film Awards	Best Foreign Actor	Howard Da Silva	Nominated
British Academy Film Awards	Most Promising Newcomer to Leading Film Roles	Keir Dullea	Nominated
British Academy Film Awards	Most Promising Newcomer to Leading Film Roles	Janet Margolin	Nominated
Golden Globe Awards	Most Promising Newcomer – Male	Keir Dullea	Won
Golden Globe Awards	Most Promising Newcomer – Female	Janet Margolin	Nominated
Laurel Awards	Sleeper of the Year		Won
San Francisco International Film Festival	Best Actor	Keir Dullea	Won
San Francisco International Film Festival	Best Actress	Janet Margolin	Won
Venice International Film Festival	Best First Work	Frank Perry	Won (Note: Tied with Fernando Birri for Los Inundados.)

== Play adaptation ==
In 1967, the film was adapted into a stage play, but it only ran for a short time.

=== Plot of the stage play ===
The play begins with David Clemens and his mother preparing to leave to bring David to "school". We later learn this is a school for children with mental and psychological issues. David's mother is overprotective and overbearing, and it shows. At the station, a porter touches David's arm, and we learn that David is afraid to be touched.

We meet a variety of teachers and other students, particularly Dr. Alan Swinford, the head psychologist, and are introduced to the school. We learn that David has an obsession with clocks, and also with death. We are also introduced to the other title character, Lisa Brandt, who has a split personality: one who will only speak in rhymes and the other who will not speak, but will only write or draw her thoughts. Over time, David and Lisa befriend each other, until midway through the play, after an embittering visit, David's parents take him away from the school.

David eventually runs away from his home and comes back to the school, where he is allowed to stay. One day, however, Lisa is annoying David as he listens to another child playing the piano. David becomes cross and shouts at her, and Lisa runs away from the school. David and the head psychologist, Dr. Alan Swinford, go out in search of her, and arrive just in time to save Lisa from the ravages of two boys in a city park. David and Lisa are both relieved that the other is there for them, and somehow Lisa is cured of her two personalities and becomes truly herself, speaking "plain straight" to David for the first time. David extends his hand and asks her to take it, conquering his fear of being touched, and they walk off together, hand in hand.

== Television film remake ==
In 1998, the film was remade into a made-for-television film that premiered on ABC on November 1, 1998. Produced by Oprah Winfrey and directed by Lloyd Kramer, the film starred Lukas Haas as David Clemens, Brittany Murphy as Lisa Brandt, and Sidney Poitier as Dr. Alan Swinford, with a supporting cast featuring Debi Mazar, Allison Janney, Kim Murphy, Giuseppe Andrews, Vicellous Reon Shannon, Gene Wolande, Kimiko Gelman, and Ty Hodges. The scenes were shifted to the Los Angeles area, including the Museum of Natural History at Exposition Park and Venice Beach.

=== Awards and nominations ===
Award	Category	Nominee(s)	Result	Ref.
Primetime Emmy Awards	Outstanding Music Composition for a Miniseries or a Movie (Dramatic Underscore)	Marco Beltrami	Nominated	
Young Artist Awards	Best Performance in a TV Movie/Pilot/Mini-Series or Series – Leading Young Actress	Brittany Murphy	Nominated	

== See also ==
- List of American films of 1962
- Mental illness in film
