= Pat Renella =

American actor (1929–2012)

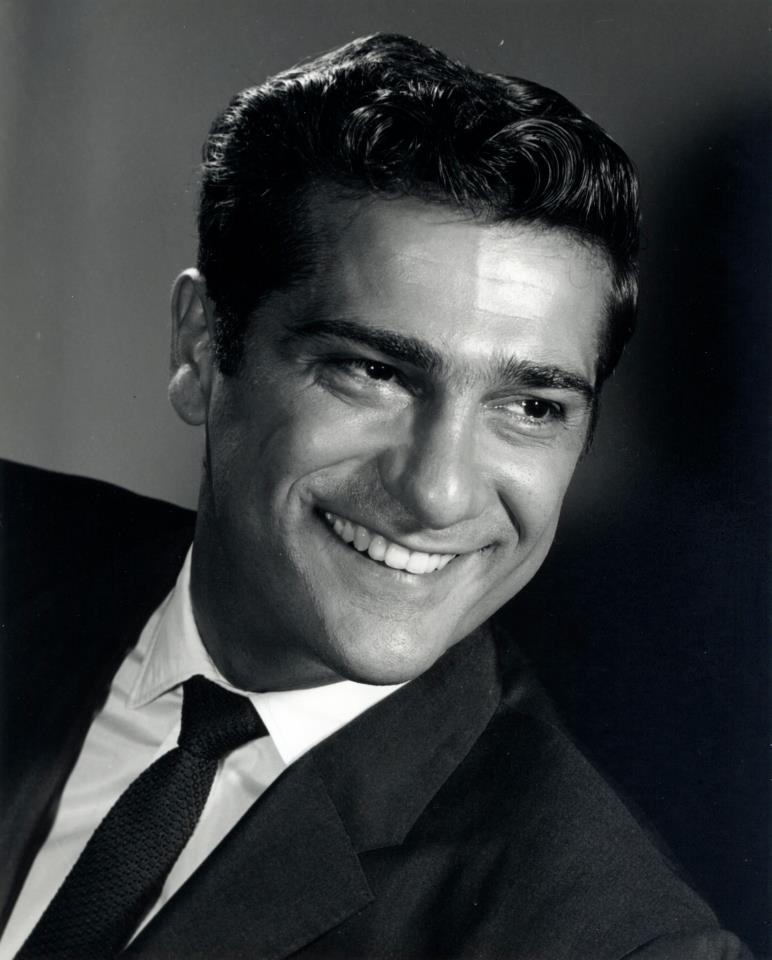
- Renella in 1968
- Born: March 24, 1929; Chicago, Illinois, US
- Died: November 9, 2012 (aged 83); Los Angeles, California, US
- Occupation: Actor
- Years active: 1960–1991

Pat Renella (March 24, 1929 – November 9, 2012) was an American actor. His motion picture debut was as an engineer in the space drama X-15 (1961) starring David McLean and Charles Bronson.

Renella acted in the stage play Bullfight, which opened at the Coronet Repertory Theatre on North La Cienega in West Hollywood on November 17, 1961. He returned to the stage in Joe Mantegna's baseball comedy "Bleacher Bums" in 1983.

Although there is not much written about him in the Los Angeles Times of the day, he was a working actor, mostly playing small parts as gangster types and hoods.

After playing an uncredited part as a man in the movie The Silencers (1966) starring Dean Martin and Stella Stevens, with Victor Buono, Renella had an uncredited small part in Riot on Sunset Strip (1967) starring Aldo Ray. He then played the role as Claude Sadi in Dayton's Devils (1968) starring Rory Calhoun, Leslie Nielsen, and Lainie Kazan. That same year, Renella played Johnny Ross, a Mafia supposed informant scheduled to testify in San Francisco, in Bullitt starring Steve McQueen, Robert Vaughn, and Jacqueline Bisset.

On television, Bert Convy played the role of Roxy in the pilot episode of the situation comedy The New Phil Silvers Show in 1963, but Renella portrayed Roxy for the rest of the show′s 1963–1964 run, appearing in eight episodes. Renella's guest appearances on television include the hit shows Route 66, Combat!, Planet of the Apes, Mannix, The High Chaparral, McCloud, The Rockford Files, The Streets of San Francisco, Hunter, The Dukes of Hazzard, and the soap opera General Hospital.

One year when he attended the Academy Awards, he went over to Ginger Rogers at a party afterward and asked her to dance. She said yes, but told him to come back when they played something slower, which he did.

Renella played the manager of the inn in the sci-fi horror drama Moonchild (1974) starring Victor Buono and John Carradine, and he played Duke in Run for the Roses (1977) starring Panchito Gomez and Vera Miles.

He played a policeman in the comedy Beverly Hills Brats (1989) starring Burt Young, Martin Sheen, and Terry Moore, and was shown flubbing a line in the bloopers shown over the end credits.

== Death ==
Pat Renella died at age 83 at Cedars-Sinai Medical Center in Los Angeles. He is entombed in the mausoleum at Queen of Heaven Cemetery in Hillside, Illinois, a suburb of Chicago.

== Filmography ==
Year	Title	Role	Notes
1961	X-15	Engineer	Uncredited
1963	A Gathering of Eagles	Sergeant	Uncredited
1966	The Silencers	Man	Uncredited
1967	Riot on Sunset Strip	Perry	
1967	In Like Flint	Restaurant Proprietor	Uncredited
1968	Dayton's Devils	Claude Sadi	
1968	Bullitt	Johnny Ross	
1974	Moonchild	Manager	
1977	Run for the Roses	Duke	
1977	A Piece of the Action	Nikos	
