= The Swimmer (1968 film) =

1968 drama film by Frank Perry

- Theatrical release poster
- Directed by: Frank Perry
- Screenplay by: Eleanor Perry
- Based on: "The Swimmer" by John Cheever
- Produced by: Frank Perry; Roger Lewis
- Starring: Burt Lancaster; Janet Landgard; Janice Rule
- Cinematography: David L. Quaid
- Edited by: Sidney Katz; Carl Lerner; Pat Somerset
- Music by: Marvin Hamlisch
- Production company: Horizon Pictures
- Distributed by: Columbia Pictures
- Release date: May 15, 1968 (New York City)
- Running time: 95 minutes
- Country: United States
- Language: English

The Swimmer is a 1968 American psychological drama film directed by Frank Perry. Starring Burt Lancaster in the title role, the film is based on the 1964 short story "The Swimmer" by John Cheever (which originally appeared in the July 18, 1964, issue of The New Yorker) as adapted by Eleanor Perry. Janet Landgard and Janice Rule appear in featured support.

Filmed largely on location in affluent Westport, Connecticut, The Swimmer was produced by three-time Academy Award for Best Picture winner Sam Spiegel; through his company, Horizon Pictures, remained credited, Spiegel ultimately had his name removed from the film.

== Plot ==
In a wealthy suburb in Connecticut, Ned Merrill emerges from the woods wearing only a bathing suit. He drops by the pool of some old friends, who offer him a cocktail while nursing hangovers from the night before. Ned recollects a youthful adventure he and a friend once had swimming up the clean green headwaters of a river as camp buddies. As they share more stories, Ned realizes that a series of backyard swimming pools could form a "river" back to his house, making it possible for him to "swim his way home". Ned dives into the pool and begins his journey. His behavior perplexes his friends.

As Ned travels, he encounters other neighbors at their pools. Among them is radiant 20-year-old Julie Ann Hooper, who used to babysit his daughters (who are "at home playing tennis", he explains). He reveals his plan and she exitedly joins him. They crash another pool party and sip champagne. The pair run around in an equestrian rink before Ned stumbles going over a hurdle, then downplays his injury. While chatting in a grove of trees, Julie reveals that she had a schoolgirl crush on him. After she tells him about some uncomfortable incidents in her workplace, Ned begins talking about how he will protect her. Discomfited by his sudden intimacy, Julie runs off.

Ned meets the Hallorans, a wealthy older couple sunning poolside. Nudists, they are unbothered by his eccentric behavior but unimpressed by what they perceive as his posturing, and are suspicious that he wants to ask them for money again. He then encounters Kevin Gilmartin Jr., a lonely young boy, whom he tries to teach how to swim. They use his family's abandoned empty pool, which Ned tells Kevin to imagine is filled with water. Kevin warms to this method, and soon is "swimming" its length. As Ned takes his leave, he glances back and sees Kevin bouncing on the diving board over the deep end of the pool. He rushes back to remove him to safety, then departs.

Ned walks into another party, where hostess Grace Biswanger receives him coldly, calling him a "gate crasher". Ned jumps into the pool, grabbing the attention of the guests. When he emerges from the water, he notices a hot dog cart that used to be his. HE gets into an argument with Grace and her husband Henry, who claims to have bought it at a white elephant sale. Ned's pleas to repurchase the cart are rebuffed, and he leaves in shame.

He shows up at the backyard pool of Shirley Abbott, a stage actress and his mistress of several years back. As he reminisces on their past, his approaches to her become steadily more intimate, and aggressive. Emotionally torn, she rebuffs him, claiming that she never loved him and feigned enjoying their time together. Ned takes a lap in her pool after she storms off, becoming fatigued as he climbs out.

Limping ever more heavily, Ned trudges barefoot alongside a busy highway to the crowded town swimming pool. After being forced to borrow money to get in and demeaned by pool employees, he encounters a group of local shop owners who snipe at encountering him at such a "plebeian" location, and ask when he will settle his unpaid bills. Ned's demeanor starts to falter when the owners make vicious comments about his wife's snobbish tastes and his daughters' embarrassing incidents with the law. Ned defends his family and claims his daughters respect him, but when one of the owners remarks that Ned's daughters call him a joke behind his back, he flees.

The skies darken and rain begins falling. Amid a downpour at sunset, a shivering Ned staggers home; the tennis court is in disrepair, a gate rusted shut, and his house deserted, vandalized, and locked. Anguished, he repeatedly pounds on the door, before collapsing exhausted in the doorway in the fetal position.

== Cast ==
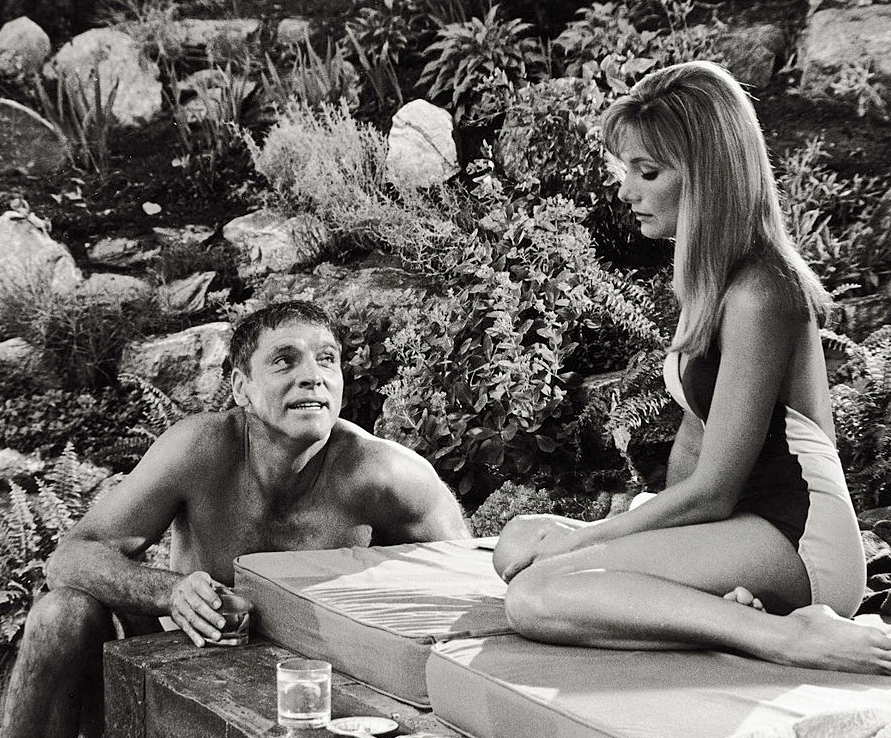
Burt Lancaster filming with Barbara Loden, before she was replaced with Janice Rule in the role of Shirley Abbott

- Burt Lancaster as Ned Merrill
- Janet Landgard as Julie Ann Hooper
- Janice Rule as Shirley Abbott
- Joan Rivers as Joan
- Tony Bickley as Donald Westerhazy
- Marge Champion as Peggy Forsburgh
- Kim Hunter as Betty Graham
- Bill Fiore as Howie Hunsacker
- Rose Gregorio as Sylvia Finney
- Charles Drake as Howard Graham
- House Jameson as Mr. Halloran
- Nancy Cushman as Mrs. Halloran
- Bernie Hamilton as Halloran's chauffeur
- Jimmy Joyce as Jack Finney
- Michael Kearney as Kevin Gilmartin Jr.
- Richard McMurray as Stu Forsburgh
- Jan Miner as Lillian Hunsacker
- Diana Muldaur as Cynthia
- Keri Oleson as Vernon Hooper
- Cornelia Otis Skinner as Mrs. Hammar
- Dolph Sweet as Henry Biswanger
- Louise Troy as Grace Biswanger
- Diana Van der Vlis as Helen Westerhazy

== Production ==
The Swimmer was produced by Sam Spiegel, a three-time Academy Award for Best Picture winner, who ultimately removed his name from the film; his company, Horizon Pictures, remained credited. It was filmed largely on location in Westport, Connecticut, the affluent Fairfield County hometown of director Frank Perry.

Although he was a trained athlete, star Burt Lancaster had a fear of the water and took swimming lessons from former Olympian and water polo coach Bob Horn to prepare for the film. After working on several television series, Janet Landgard's first featured cinematic role was in this film. The Swimmer was comedian Joan Rivers' film debut as an actress. She had appeared as herself three years earlier in Hootenanny a Go Go, also released as Once Upon a Coffeehouse. In The Swimmer, her short scene took an unexpectedly long time to film, which she blamed on Lancaster. She later wrote in her autobiography Still Talking; "he redirected every line ... Frank (Perry) wanted a happy girl who then got hurt. Lancaster was going to be Mr. Wonderful who came up against a mean bitch, and was right not to go off with her. Trying to please both men, I was going back and forth between line readings, and nothing made sense." Janice Rule replaced Barbara Loden in the part of Shirley Abbott. Author John Cheever, who wrote the original short story "The Swimmer", has a cameo in the film greeting Ned Merrill (Lancaster) and Julie Hooper (Janet Landgard) at a party.

After principal photography from July to September 1966, Perry expected to shoot additional transition scenes but was fired by Spiegel. The producers brought in the young director Sydney Pollack, Lancaster's friend, and cinematographer Michael Nebbia for January 1967 reshoots in California. Pollack reportedly shot several transitions and scenes, including scenes with Kim Hunter replacing Sally Gracie as Betty Graham, Charles Drake replacing Larry Haines as Howard Graham, Bernie Hamilton replacing Billy Dee Williams as the chauffeur and Rule replacing Loden. According to Eleanor Perry, both Spiegel and Elia Kazan had an interest in getting the scene where Ned assaults Shirley toned down and subsequently each blamed the other for Loden's replacement. In addition to the above scenes, Pollack and Nebbia shot the scene with Ned and the horse as well as some retakes of the Song of Solomon scene. According to Lancaster, when the film still needed an additional day of shooting, he paid $10,000 for it out of his own pocket.

== Reception ==
While the initial box office response to the film was "lackluster", it was a critical success. Roger Ebert gave it four stars out of four, deeming it "a strange, stylized work, a brilliant and disturbing one." Vincent Canby of The New York Times wrote: "although literal in style, the film has the shape of an open-ended hallucination. It is a grim, disturbing and sometimes funny view of a very small, very special segment of upper-middle-class American life." Variety wrote "a lot of people are not going to understand this film; many will loathe it; others will be moved deeply. Its detractors will be most vocal; its supporters will not have high-powered counter-arguments."

The Swimmer has attained cult film status in the 21st century. On review aggregator Rotten Tomatoes, the film has an approval rating of 100% based on reviews from 25 critics, with an average rating of 7.9/10. The site's critical consensus summarizes: "The Swimmer dives into its penetrating indictment of 1960s suburbia with a career highlight performance from Burt Lancaster and evocatively lensed imagery."

== Soundtrack ==
The Swimmer

Soundtrack album by Marvin Hamlisch
- Released: March 2006
- Label: Film Score Monthly

The score was composed by a first-time film composer, 24-year-old Marvin Hamlisch, and was orchestrated by Leo Shuken and Jack Hayes. The music has dramatic passages for a small orchestra along with a mid-1960s pop sound. Hamlisch got the job after Spiegel hired him to play the piano at one of his parties. The soundtrack album was originally released as an LP by CBS Records in 1968, while the complete score was released in 2006 by Film Score Monthly.

== Home media ==
The Swimmer was originally released on VHS in 1985 by RCA/Columbia Pictures Home Video. A DVD was released in 2003. The 2003 release was considered a "ho-hum looking widescreen transfer ... (with) a number of imperfections (including grain and dirt aplenty)", the image suffering from "a true lack of detail and bleeding colors" and was criticized for having few special features.

In 2014, Grindhouse Releasing/Box Office (in co-operation with Columbia) released The Swimmer on Blu-ray in high definition. Eccentric Cinema praised the company, saying "Grindhouse have been establishing themselves as the Criterion of offbeat cinema ... They have taken a previously rare, and quite obscure, title and given it the special edition treatment that its fans have long dreamt of. The two-disc DVD/Blu-ray combo pack is attractively packaged and is stuffed to the gills with extras, but first things first: the film itself looks stunning in a new high definition, 1.85/16x9 transfer."

Extras on the release include a five-part documentary, The Story of the Swimmer, which includes comments from surviving production and cast members including Janet Landgard, Joan Rivers, Marge Champion, first and second assistant directors Michael Hertzberg and Ted Zachary, Bob Horn, as well as Lancaster's daughter Joanna, and archival interviews with composer Marvin Hamlisch and editor Sidney Katz. Reviewer Troy Howarth of Eccentric Cinema remarked: "It's a brilliant piece of work by editor/director Chris Innis and it definitely raises the bar of what one can expect with such retrospective featurettes." Brian Orndorf of Blu-ray.com commented: "The Story of The Swimmer ... is a miraculous five-part documentary from Innis that dissects the feature in full ... the candor put forth here is outstanding, generating a riveting tale of a Hollywood tug of war ... It's an exhaustive documentary, but there's never a dull moment."

Also included in the release are title sequence outtakes, Frank Perry's storyboards, production stills (including Loden's deleted scene), trailers, TV spots, an audio recording of Cheever reading the original short story, as well as a 12-page color booklet with essays by filmmaker Stuart Gordon and Innis. The cover sleeve comes with new cover art from illustrator Glen Orbik. There is also a separate 2013 interview with Champion. The International Press Academy has recognized Grindhouse Releasing's restoration of The Swimmer with a Satellite Award for Outstanding Overall Blu-Ray/DVD at the 19th Satellite Awards in 2015.

== See also ==
- List of American films of 1968
