= Forbidden Love (1982 film) =

- Genre: Drama; Romance
- Teleplay by: Priscilla English; Laurian Leggett
- Directed by: Steven Hilliard Stern
- Starring: Yvette Mimieux; Andrew Stevens; Lisa Lucas; Jerry Houser; Randy Brooks
- Theme music composer: Hagood Hardy
- Country of origin: United States
- Original language: English

Production
- Executive producer: Frank von Zerneck
- Producers: Marcy Gross; Ann Weston
- Cinematography: Isidore Mankofsky
- Editor: Kurt Hirschler
- Running time: 100 min.
- Production companies: Gross-Weston Productions; Moonlight Productions; Orion Television

Original release
- Network: CBS
- Release: October 18, 1982

Forbidden Love is a 1982 American TV film.

== Plot ==
San Francisco businesswoman Joanna (Yvette Mimieux), a wealthy divorcee, who owns her own successful catalog company, meets Casey, the handsome aspiring heart surgeon and Marin county hospital intern (Andrew Stevens) half her age on a ski slope, and begins a love affair. As they date, she ends up showering him with lavish gifts, realizing his modest budget can't accommodate her style of dining and entertaining.

She later persuades him to move in with her, but their hot love affair runs afoul of his hard-working blue-collar parents and her disapproving college-age daughter (Lisa Lucas) only slightly younger than the doctor, in this umpteenth variation on the older woman-younger man romance theme.

As they are seen at society events, it becomes more obvious he is giving up his more casual social scene and friends in consideration for her, though it is a struggle for him.

However, when their relationship collides with the judgment of their respective families and snide comments from outsiders, Joanna relents and breaks his heart by suddenly ending their relationship. In the last scene, he is seen packing his clothes but leaving the mansion, leaving behind all of her gifts, including the new sports car as he departs with tears in his eyes.

== Cast ==
- Yvette Mimieux as Joanna Bittan
- Andrew Stevens as Casey Wagner
- Lisa Lucas as Pamela (Joanna’s daughter)
