= Moonchild (1974 film) =

- Theatrical poster
- Directed by: Alan Gadney
- Screenplay by: Alan Gadney
- Starring: Victor Buono; John Carradine; William Challee; Janet Landgard
- Cinematography: Emmett Alston
- Edited by: Jack Conrad
- Music by: Bill Byers; Patrick Williams
- Distributed by: American Films Ltd.
- Release date: 1974
- Running time: 90 minutes
- Country: United States
- Language: English

Moonchild is a 1974 American independent horror film directed and produced by Alan Gadney. It was originally shot in 1971 as a student film (a master's thesis project at the University of Southern California). The film received limited commercial release under the title The Moon Child, but failed to make much of an initial impression on audiences. It has since gained recognition among film enthusiasts, who discovered it due to its impressive cast of character actors: John Carradine, Victor Buono, Pat Renella, Janet Landgard, and William Challee.

== Plot ==
A young man (the Moon Child) is reincarnated every 25 years, with each life ending in a stay at a mission hotel. There he meets characters from his first life, all of whom are doomed to relive their roles in his life (and death), as well. The cycle will end when his spirit reaches a state of perfection by purging its negative (violent) impulses. Actor John Carradine is the Walker of the World, an otherworldly poet who is there to observe, and record for posterity, the proceedings.

== Critical reception ==
The Spinning Image said, "Moonchild has a pretty terrible reputation, if indeed it can be said to have a reputation at all, for it is one of the most obscure American horror movies."

== See also ==
- List of American films of 1974
