= Ladybug Ladybug (film) =

1963 film by Frank Perry

- Theatrical release poster
- Directed by: Frank Perry
- Written by: Eleanor Perry
- Based on: "They Thought the War Was On!" by Lois Dickert
- Produced by: Frank Perry
- Starring: Jane Connell; William Daniels; Kathryn Hays; Nancy Marchand; Estelle Parsons; Alice Playten
- Cinematography: Leonard Hirschfield
- Edited by: Armond Lebowitz
- Music by: Bob Cobert
- Production company: Francis Productions Inc.
- Distributed by: United Artists
- Release date: December 23, 1963
- Running time: 82 minutes
- Country: United States
- Language: English
- Budget: $320,000

Ladybug Ladybug is a 1963 American docudrama film directed by Frank Perry and written by Eleanor Perry. The film is a commentary on the psychological effects of the Cold War, the title deriving from the classic nursery rhyme. It marked the film debuts of William Daniels, Estelle Parsons and Jane Connell.

The film was inspired by a McCall's magazine story by Lois Dickert (Lois Dickert Armstrong), "They Thought the War Was On!", about an actual incident at a California elementary school during the 1962 Cuban Missile Crisis.

== Plot ==
One morning, teachers at a secluded countryside elementary school are asked to accompany the pupils to their homes after a nuclear attack warning alarm sounds and the staff are unable to determine whether or not the alarm was false. One teacher, Mrs. Andrews, and the children under her care walk through the countryside, with a slowly building sense of doom about what they believe to be the upcoming nuclear holocaust. Several of the children reach their homes; one girl, JoAnn, cowers under a bed after her parents refuse to take the threat seriously; a boy, Luke, leads his dementia-ridden grandmother to take cover in their basement; another girl, Sarah, runs off in a panic after finding her house empty.

When several of the children finally gain access to a bomb shelter, they do not allow Sarah to join them, claiming there is not enough room. Sarah frantically searches for shelter and hides inside an old abandoned refrigerator; she is not seen again and her fate is never explained. A boy named Steve leaves the shelter to try and find her, and as he runs along outside the sound of a jet is suddenly heard overhead and one shown flying high in the sky. Steve cowers in the shadow of planes passing in the sky above and repeatedly yells "Stop!" as the camera moves closer to his face, goes out of focus and then fades to black, marking the end of the movie.

== Cast ==
- Jane Connell as Mrs. Maxton
- William Daniels as Mr. Calkins
- James Frawley as Truck Driver
- Richard Hamilton as JoAnn's Father
- Kathryn Hays as Mrs. Forbes
- Judith Lowry as Luke's Grandmother
- Nancy Marchand as Mrs. Andrews
- Estelle Parsons as JoAnn's Mother
- Doug Chapin as Gary
- Miles Chapin as Joel
- Alan Howard as Luke
- Linda Meyer as JoAnn
- Alice Playten as Harriet
- Marilyn Rogers as Sarah
- Christopher Howard as Steve

== Critical reception ==
Writing in The New York Times, film critic Bosley Crowther noted that despite the film's "respectable intentions," it "is too slight in dramatic structure and too prosaic, really, to carry much punch," that "details are weakly developed and tension is barely drawn," and the "climactic detail, in which a tragedy for one of the children is implied [...] is so sudden and arbitrary in the pedestrian flow of the film that it seems much more a theatrical contrivance than a likely happening." Critic Glenn Erickson described the film as an "uncompromising, difficult-to-watch ordeal" that is "quality filmmaking that expresses an important message [that is] tense and emotionally punishing," and that the film "find[s] the worst possible outcome to twist one’s insides in helpless frustration," likening it to "the traumatic connection between Duck and Cover and Miracle Mile—or Romper Room of Fear."

== See also ==
- List of American films of 1963
