= Sue Kaufman =

American novelist

Sue Kaufman (August 7, 1926 – June 25, 1977) was an American author best known for the novel Diary of a Mad Housewife.

== Biography ==
Kaufman was born on Long Island, New York. She received her degree from Vassar College in 1947. In 1953, she married a doctor named Jeremiah Abraham Barondess, with whom she had a son. At Vassar, she did some editorial work. Her works appeared in The Atlantic Monthly, The Paris Review, and The Saturday Evening Post. Her first novel came out in 1959. In 1967, she wrote Diary of a Mad Housewife, which was adapted as a movie in 1970. Having struggled with depression for years, and facing another stay in a psychiatric institution the next day, she committed suicide on June 25, 1977 by jumping from her eighteenth-story apartment, at age 50. The Sue Kaufman Prize for First Fiction is named in her honor.

== Bibliography ==
- The Happy Summer Days (1959)
- Green Holly (1961)
- Diary of a Mad Housewife (1967)
- The Headshrinker's Test (1969)
- Falling Bodies (1974)
- The Master and Other Stories (1976)
