= Diary of a Mad Housewife =

1970 film by Frank Perry

- Theatrical release poster
- Directed by: Frank Perry
- Screenplay by: Eleanor Perry
- Based on: Diary of a Mad Housewife (1967 novel) by Sue Kaufman
- Produced by: Frank Perry
- Starring: Richard Benjamin; Frank Langella; Carrie Snodgress
- Cinematography: Gerald Hirschfeld
- Edited by: Sidney Katz
- Production company: Frank Perry Films Inc.
- Distributed by: Universal Pictures
- Release date: August 10, 1970
- Running time: 95 minutes
- Country: United States
- Language: English
- Box office: $6.1 million (rentals)

Diary of a Mad Housewife is a 1970 American comedy drama film directed and produced by Frank Perry, adapted by Eleanor Perry from the 1967 novel by Sue Kaufman. It stars Carrie Snodgress in the titular role, along with Richard Benjamin and Frank Langella as the men in her life.

The film was critically acclaimed, and Snodgress' performance earned her several accolades. She won Golden Globes for Best Actress in Motion Picture – Comedy or Musical and Most Promising Newcomer – Female, and received Academy Award and BAFTA Award nominations.

== Plot ==
Tina Balser, an educated, frustrated housewife and mother, is in a loveless marriage with Jonathan, an insufferable, controlling, emotionally abusive, social-climbing lawyer in New York City. He treats her like a servant, undermines her with insults, and belittles her appearance, abilities, and the raising of their two girls Sylvie and Liz, who treat their mother with the same rudeness as their father. Searching for relief, she begins a sexually fulfilling affair with a cruel and coarse writer, George Prager, who treats her with similar brusqueness and contempt, which only drives her deeper into despair.

At the climax of the film, Jonathan confesses to Tina that his ambitious plans have collapsed. A French vineyard he had invested in is wiped out, and he is now in debt. Because he has been focusing on non-job issues, his work at his law firm has suffered. He also confesses to having an affair. Tina tells Jonathan that she accepts what he has done and promises to support him, but does not tell him of her own affair with George.

In the conclusion, Tina is shown telling this story in a group therapy session, thus opening the possibility that her presentation of these events has been slanted to make her look more put-upon and the men in her life more mean and foolish. However, the other participants of her therapy group criticize and belittle her, while complaining about their own lot in life and how her issues seem petty by comparison. The final shot is of Tina's steadfast face as angry voices from the group are heard from off-screen with the credits rolling at the sides.

== Cast ==
- Carrie Snodgress as Bettina "Tina" Balser
- Richard Benjamin as Jonathan Balser
- Frank Langella as George Prager
- Lorraine Cullen as Sylvie Balser
- Frannie Michel as Liz Balser
- Lee Addoms as Mrs. Prinz
- Peter Dohanos as Samuel Keefer
- Katherine Meskill as Charlotte Rady
- Leonard Elliott as M. Henri
- Margo as Valma
- Hilda Haynes as Lottie
- George Loros as Malcolm
- The Alice Cooper Band as Themselves

Uncredited

- Lester Rawlins as Dr. Linstrom
- Peter Boyle as Man in group therapy

== Release ==
=== Home media ===
Universal had made the film available on VHS through its MCA Home Video label, and later through license to Goodtimes Home Video. However, for many years, it was not made available on DVD, likely due to music clearance issues with the Alice Cooper performance, and VHS copies of Housewife became rare, with sealed copies routinely selling for more than $100 on websites like Amazon.com and eBay. The film was released on a bootleg DVD on October 15, 2014; After years of being out-of-print, Kino Lorber released the film on DVD and Blu-ray on December 15, 2020. The UK-based label Indicator/Powerhouse released their own Blu-ray edition in 2022, which included the long-unavailable TV recut of the film as a bonus feature.

== Reception ==
=== Critical response ===
The film was critically acclaimed: It maintains an 82% rating at Rotten Tomatoes from 17 reviews. Roger Ebert gave the movie three out of four stars, writing "What makes the movie work...is that it's played entirely from the housewife's point of view, and that the housewife is played brilliantly by Carrie Snodgress."

Neil Young wrote the song "A Man Needs a Maid" inspired by Snodgress in Diary of a Mad Housewife: "I was watching a movie with a friend/I fell in love with the actress/she was playing a part I could understand." The song was included on his 1972 album Harvest. Soon after, Young and Snodgress became romantically involved for several years.

Groucho Marx criticized the movie in an interview on The Dick Cavett Show on May 25, 1971. He stated that it was an example of dirty entertainment and that he did not like it because the characters were in bed for 80 minutes. He made a joke of this, saying "Well I'm not interested in that. I don't care what they're doing in the sack. If I'm not doing it, why should I sit in the theater and watch it?"

=== Awards and nominations ===
Award	Category	Nominee(s)	Result	Ref.
Academy Awards	Best Actress	Carrie Snodgress	Nominated	
British Academy Film Awards	Most Promising Newcomer to Leading Film Roles	Carrie Snodgress	Nominated	
Golden Globe Awards	Best Motion Picture – Musical or Comedy		Nominated	
Golden Globe Awards	Best Actor in a Motion Picture – Musical or Comedy	Richard Benjamin	Nominated	
Golden Globe Awards	Best Actress in a Motion Picture – Musical or Comedy	Carrie Snodgress	Won	
Golden Globe Awards	Most Promising Newcomer – Male	Frank Langella	Nominated	
Golden Globe Awards	Most Promising Newcomer – Female	Carrie Snodgress	Won	
Laurel Awards	Best Picture		7th Place	
Laurel Awards	Top Male Comedy Performance	Richard Benjamin	5th Place	
Laurel Awards	Top Female Dramatic Performance	Carrie Snodgress	Won	
Laurel Awards	Star of Tomorrow – Male	Frank Langella	Nominated	
Laurel Awards	Star of Tomorrow – Female	Carrie Snodgress	Won	
National Board of Review Awards	Top Ten Films		7th Place	
National Board of Review Awards	Best Supporting Actor	Frank Langella	Won	
New York Film Critics Circle Awards	Best Supporting Actor	Frank Langella	Runner-up	

== Television edit ==
When the film was premiered on NBC in 1973, Universal prepared an "Edited for Television" alternative version, removing all traces of nudity and strong language, and also including a substantial amount of material not found in the theatrical cut. The reinstated scenes depicted interactions between Tina Balser (Snodgress) and various domestics and repair personnel, and her male psychiatrist, Dr. Linstrom (Lester Rawlins), as well as a confrontation between her and her disrespectful daughter Sylvie (Lorraine Cullen). The extent and intensity of her extramarital affair with George was toned down due to the removal of scenes depicting them naked or involved in sex activity. It was not authorized or approved by either Frank or Eleanor Perry.
