= Evening Primrose (ABC Stage 67) =

- ABC Stage 67 episode
- Original television soundtrack recording
- Episode no.: Season 1 Episode 9
- Directed by: Paul Bogart
- Written by: James Goldman; John Collier
- Story by: James Goldman
- Editing by: John Wells
- Original air date: November 16, 1966
- Running time: 60 minutes

Guest appearances
- Anthony Perkins as Charles Snell; Dorothy Stickney as Mrs. Monday; Larry Gates as Roscoe Potts; Charmian Carr as Ella Harkins; Margaret Bannerman as Store Person; Margaret Barker as Store Person; Leonard Elliott as The Judge; Michael Meola as The Guard; Dorothy Sands as Miss McLeish; Margaretta Warwick as Mrs. Bilbee

Episode chronology
| ← Previous "The People Trap" | Next → "Noon Wine" |

"Evening Primrose" is the ninth episode of the first season of the American television series ABC Stage 67. The episode is a musical with a book by James Goldman and lyrics and music by Stephen Sondheim. It is based on a John Collier short story published in the 1951 collection Fancies and Goodnights. The story was originally published in 1940.

Written originally for television, the musical focuses on Charles (Anthony Perkins), a poet who takes refuge from the world by hiding out in a department store after closing. He meets a community of night people who live in the store and falls in love with a beautiful young girl named Ella (Charmian Carr). Bizarre complications arise when the leader of the group forbids their relationship.

== Synopsis ==
Poet Charles Snell takes refuge from the world by hiding out in a department store after closing ("If You Can Find Me, I'm Here"). Once there he finds a secret group who have lived in the store for years. The leader of the group, Mrs. Monday, permits Charles to stay after he convinces her that he is a poet.

Charles meets and is smitten with a beautiful young girl, Ella Harkins, Mrs. Monday's maid. Ella, who is now 19, has lived in the store since she was separated from her mother at age six, falling asleep in the women's hat department. Ella is unhappy and wants to leave, but is afraid of the "Dark Men." Should someone try to return to the outside world and risk revealing the group's existence, the Dark Men take them away and another mannequin appears in the clothing department.

Charles realizes Ella has not seen the sun for thirteen years. Ella tries to tell Charles about her life before, but realizes that most of her memories from outside are being replaced with memories of living in the store ("I Remember"). Charles has fallen in love with Ella; as he plays cards with members of the group, he has a quiet duet with Ella ("When"). Ella finally decides to leave with Charles ("Take Me to the World"). Charles is initially reluctant to leave his now-comfortable life, but then understands that he loves Ella more than poetry. Mrs. Monday and the others hear their plans, and they call the Dark Men, as Ella and Charles try to escape.

The store opens the next morning with a couple on the sidewalk who resemble Ella and Charles from behind, but turn out to be strangers when the camera pans to their faces. They're looking at a window display in which Ella and Charles are now mannequins dressed as a bride and groom, with the night watchman acting as their minister.

== Productions ==
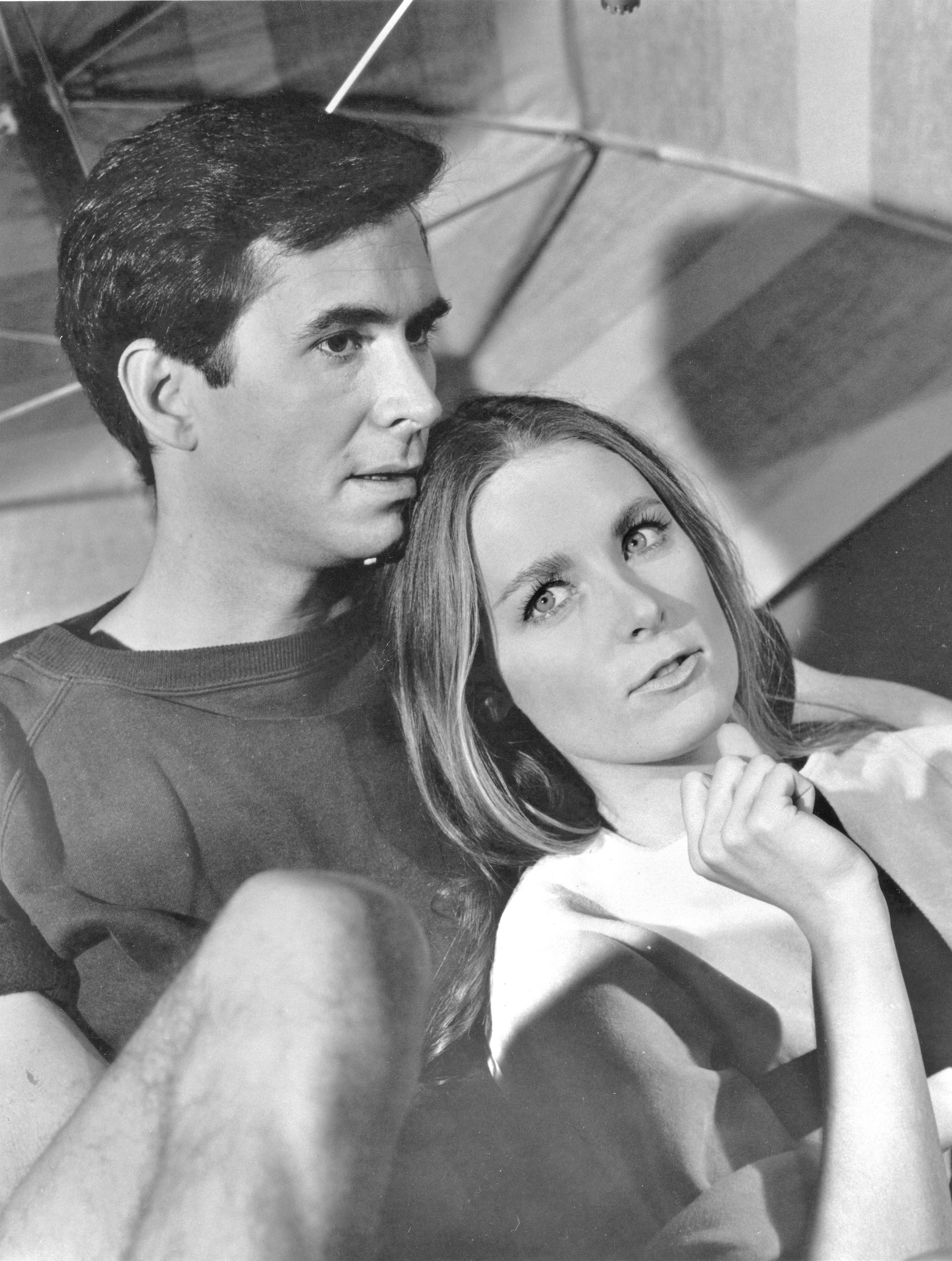
Anthony Perkins as Charles Snell; Charmian Carr as Ella Harkins

Adapted specifically for the television anthology series ABC Stage 67, it aired on November 16, 1966. It was directed by Paul Bogart, set design by John Ward, set decorated by Budd Gourmen, costume design by William McHone, and lighting design by Walter Urban. The cast starred Anthony Perkins as Charles Snell, Charmian Carr as Ella Harkins, Larry Gates as Roscoe Potts, Dorothy Stickney as Mrs. Monday, and Margaret Bannerman, Margaret Barker, Leonard Elliot, Mike Meola, Dorothy Sands, and Margaretta Warwick as store people. The one-hour program was taped on an early Sunday morning at the now-defunct Stern Brothers department store in Manhattan.

The "Evening Primrose" telecast was in color, but the original master tape has never been found. The Black-and-white (B&W) version is available for viewing at the Paley Center for Media in New York City. A newly discovered pristine B&W 16-millimeter copy was used for DVDs which were released commercially for the first time on October 26, 2010.

The first professional theatrical production was staged in London as part of the Lost Musicals series. It opened at the Lilian Baylis Studio on July 3, 2005 and closed on July 24. Directed by Ian Marshall Fisher, it starred Betsy Blair as Mrs. Monday, Michael Matus as Charles Snell, Jennifer Higham as Ella Harkins, James Vaughan as Store Doorman/Night Watchman, and Gary Raymond as Roscoe, with Sylvia Seymour, Martin Gaisford, Myra Sands, David O'Brien and Andrew Beavis in supporting roles.

On October 22, 2010, the St. George's Society in New York City had a one night only semi staged performance at the Gerald W. Lynch Theater at John Jay College of Criminal Justice. The show was directed and designed by Tony Walton, musical supervision and orchestration by Sean Patrick Flahaven, and musical director Mary-Mitchell Campbell, sound design by Bernard Fox. The cast had Carmen De Lavallade (Mrs. Billbee) --she also directed some choreography, Jessica Grové (Ella), Sean Palmer (Charles), Candice Bergen (Mrs. Monday), John Cunningham (Roscoe Potts), Sondra Lee (Augusta), and William Duell (Billy).

The DVD was commercially released for the first time on April 20, 2010, by E1 Entertainment and the Archive of American Television.

== Musical score ==
- "If You Can Find Me, I'm Here"
- "Charles Meets Mrs. Monday" (instrumental)
- "Charles And Ella" (instrumental)
- "Check List" (instrumental)
- "The Basement" (instrumental)
- "I Remember"
- "When"
- "Take Me To The World"
- "The Ball" (instrumental)
- "Roscoe And The Guard" (instrumental)
- "The Ball, Part 2" (instrumental)
- "Escape" (instrumental)
- "Take Me To The World" (Reprise)
- "Final Credits" (instrumental)

== Recordings ==
An official soundtrack recording was not released commercially until 2008, when Kritzerland, Inc. issued it in a limited release of 3,000 copies. Previously, the four vocal selections had been recorded by Mandy Patinkin and Bernadette Peters for his 1990 Dress Casual album. Patinkin sang "If You Can Find Me, I'm Here," Peters sang "I Remember", and the other two songs were performed as duets. Liz Callaway and Gary Beach recorded the songs for the 1997 Varèse Sarabande release Sondheim at the Movies. Nonesuch Records released a 2001 studio recording of the four vocal selections with Neil Patrick Harris as Charles and Theresa McCarthy as Ella.

"I Remember" has been recorded by David Kernan on the recording of the musical revue Side by Side by Sondheim, as well as Sarah Brightman, Judy Collins, John Pizzarelli, Mark Murphy, Cleo Laine, Maureen McGovern, Betty Buckley, Julia Migenes, Dianne Reeves, Myrra Malmberg, Madeline Eastman, Bernadette Peters, Victoria Mallory, and Barbra Streisand. In 2014, Scottish singer Todd Gordon recorded the song in South Korea for his album Love dot com.

Dawn Upshaw included "Take Me to the World" on her 1994 musical theatre album I Wish It So.

Barbra Streisand recorded "Take Me to The World" with Antonio Banderas for her 2016 album Encore: Movie Partners Sing Broadway; Sondheim altered the song's lyrics for the project.

The 2020 virtual concert Take Me to the World: A Sondheim 90th Birthday Celebration included Laura Benanti performing "I Remember" and Raúl Esparza performing "Take Me To The World".

== Alan Parsons Project ==
The progressive rock band The Alan Parsons Project references Evening Primrose heavily in the 1984 music video for their single "Prime Time" from the album Ammonia Avenue.

In the video, a truck that is an exact duplicate for the one seen at the end of the teleplay is seen driving through a darkened city, with a cargo of mannequins. A female mannequin suddenly comes to life, and, seeing her male companion has not also done so, tearfully embraces him and leaps off the truck to freedom. Moments later, the male mannequin also comes to life and jumps to freedom and to pursue his partner. Separated, the two run through darkened back streets. pursued by the other mannequins (who have not come to life), until the woman is at last recaptured. The man finally catches up to his partner...who has been turned back into a mannequin in a window display. After he makes a distraught farewell and walks away, the woman overcomes her mannequin state and flings herself out the store window, coming back to life. As the two finally and tearfully reunite, the man looks over the woman's shoulder in terror as he realizes they are still being pursued, and the two scramble off into the dark. The video enjoyed high rotation on MTV and later on VH1.
