= The Battle of the Bulge... The Brave Rifles =

1965 film

- Directed by: Laurence E. Mascott
- Produced by: Laurence E. Mascott
- Narrated by: Arthur Kennedy
- Edited by: Alan H. Presberg
- Music by: Ruby Raksin
- Production company: Mascott Productions
- Distributed by: American Broadcasting Company
- Release date: 1965
- Running time: 52 minutes
- Country: United States
- Language: English

The Battle of the Bulge... The Brave Rifles is a 1965 documentary film produced by Laurence E. Mascott. It was nominated for an Academy Award for Best Documentary Feature. It was later aired on television as an episode of ABC Stage 67.

== See also ==
- List of American films of 1965
