= Co-Ed Fever =

American sitcom

- Genre: Sitcom
- Created by: Martin Ransohoff; Michael Elias; Frank Shaw
- Directed by: Marc Daniels
- Starring: David Keith; Heather Thomas; Alexa Kenin; Cathryn O'Neil; Tacey Phillips; Jillian Kesner
- Theme music composer: Alan Bergman; Marilyn Bergman; Henry Mancini
- Opening theme: "Dear Mom and Dad"
- Composer: Henry Mancini
- Country of origin: United States
- No. of seasons: 1
- No. of episodes: 6 (5 unaired)

Production
- Executive producer: Martin Ransohoff
- Producer: Frank Shaw
- Running time: 22–24 minutes
- Production company: Filmways

Original release
- Network: CBS
- Release: February 4, 1979

Co-Ed Fever is an American sitcom that aired on CBS in 1979. The series attempted to capitalize on the success of the motion picture National Lampoon's Animal House. It was the third of three "frat house" comedy series to air in early 1979 – the others were the direct follow-on to Animal House, ABC's Delta House, and NBC's Brothers and Sisters. After CBS aired the first episode of Co-Ed Fever as a "special preview" on February 4, 1979, the airing's low ratings and viewer complaints caused the network to cancel it before it ever aired in its planned Monday-night time slot.

Co-Ed Fever ranked number 32 on TV Guide's 50 Worst Shows of All Time list.

== Synopsis ==
The series is set in Brewster House, a dormitory on the campus of Baxter College, a formerly all-female college that has just started to admit male students. Co-Ed Fever stars Heather Thomas (as Sandi), Alexa Kenin (Maria a.k.a. "Mousie"), Cathryn O'Neil (Elizabeth), Tacey Phillips (Hope), and Jillian Kesner (Melba) as residents of Brewster House, who are joined by David Keith (Tucker Davis), Christopher S. Nelson (Doug), and Michael Pasternak (Gobo). Jane Rose plays the "spaced-out" housemother Mrs. Selby and Hamilton Camp plays the role of Mr. Peabody.

The episode "Pepperoni Passion" was aired as a "special preview" at 10:30 p.m. EST on February 4, 1979, immediately after the airing of the movie Rocky. However, Co-Ed Fever was canceled in the period between the airing and the scheduled premiere date of February 19, the result of low ratings, viewer complaints and censorship issues because of content (a problem that also affected its rival shows). CBS scheduled another new sitcom, Billy, in its time slot. Six episodes were completed, but only "Pepperoni Passion" was broadcast in the United States; however, all six were aired in Canada (on BCTV in Vancouver) in a late-afternoon weekend time slot. The Brewster House set was later reused as the girls' dormitory during the first season of The Facts of Life, which premiered during the summer of 1979.

== Episodes ==
No.	Title	Original release date
1	"Pepperoni Passion"	February 4, 1979
Trouble ensues when an all-girls college goes co-ed. Mousie pines for Tuck, who's interested in Melba, who just isn't interested.
2	"Pilot"	Unaired
3	"Disco Tuck"	Unaired
4	"Double Exposure"	Unaired
5	"Mid-Term Panic"	Unaired
6	"Goodbye, Mrs. Selby"	Unaired

== Critical response ==
In a contemporary review for the Boston Phoenix, critic Larry Simonberg wrote "don't even bother to wonder what decade [the show] is supposed to be taking place," that "this show is supposed to be about sex, but sex [...] is not anything to be worried about," and that "it demonstrates [...] contempt for the way people actually behave. It has a false heart." A review of the show in TV Guide described it as a "lame farce." Critic Alec Donaldson wrote that "college dorms always make for fun times, but not in this show. It was more flop than fever," and "this show unfortunately flunked."
