= The House Without a Christmas Tree =

- Genre: Drama; Family
- Based on: The House Without a Christmas Tree by Gail Rock
- Written by: Eleanor Perry
- Directed by: Paul Bogart
- Starring: Jason Robards; Mildred Natwick; Lisa Lucas
- Music by: Arthur B. Rubinstein
- Country of origin: United States
- Original language: English

Production
- Producer: Alan Shayne
- Production location: Uxbridge, Ontario
- Editor: Ed J. Brennan
- Running time: 75 minutes
- Production company: CBS Television Network

Original release
- Network: CBS
- Release: December 3, 1972

The House Without a Christmas Tree is a 1972 television movie, novelized into a children's book by Gail Rock in 1974. It depicts the relationship between Addie Mills (Lisa Lucas), a bright and energetic only child, and her melancholy father (Jason Robards), who never recovered from the death of his wife and forbids having a Christmas tree in the house. The videotaped production was seen regularly on CBS during the holiday season between 1972 and 1977.

== Plot synopsis ==
In fictional Clear River, Nebraska in 1946, 10-year-old Adelaide "Addie" Mills is a lonely child, who wears large glasses and lives in a plain, ordinary house with her widowed father, James Addison Mills III, and her loving paternal grandmother, Sarah. Addie's mother died from pneumonia a few months after she was born. James wonders why his beloved wife had to die rather than their sickly baby. Addie's first name is derived from her father's middle name, but his only interaction with Addie is to correct her and point out her shortcomings. There has never been a Christmas tree in the Mills home since his wife's death, although Addie continually challenges this omission.

Addie wins her class Christmas tree in a supervised contest with Gloria Cott; she uses a guessing technique learned from her father. Both she and Sarah are delighted at the prospect of their first Christmas with a tree. James angrily orders the tree removed; he even accuses Addie of cheating Gloria to win it. Sarah reminds him that the house belongs to her; he responds by threatening to take Addie and move out, leaving her alone in the house. Later that night, Addie sneaks the tree out of the house and surreptitiously donates it to Gloria—the only other student in her class who also goes treeless at Christmas, since the Cotts are too poor to afford one.

The next morning, James delivers cookies (baked by Sarah) to the Cott residence. He recognizes their new tree as the same one Addie had brought home. Realizing how selfish and unkind he has been towards his daughter, James rethinks his position. That afternoon, James comes home with a tree and several boxes of ornaments, except a star. James goes up to the attic and brings down a much more magnificent star than the one Addie had created for her prize tree. As Addie admires the star, James reveals that her mother had crafted it especially for her much-longed-for baby's first Christmas. Then he lifts Addie up to place the star on the tree.

An adult Addie narrates the final scene. Over the years, Sarah dies; Addie moves away to a big city. She returns to Clear River each year to spend Christmas with James, who always has a Christmas tree waiting upon which to place the beloved star.

== Characters ==
- Lisa Lucas as Addie Mills
- Jason Robards as James Addison Mills III, Addie's father
- Mildred Natwick as Sarah Mills, Addie's paternal grandmother
- Kathryn Walker as Miss Peggy Thompson, Addie's schoolteacher
- Alexa Kenin as Carla Mae Carter, Addie's best friend
- Patricia Hamilton as the narrator/adult Addie Mills (uncredited)
- Brady McNamara as Billy Wild, Addie's classmate
- Gail Dusome as Gloria Cott, the girl who couldn't afford a Christmas tree
- Kevin Adamson as Stuart, classmate

== Production ==
Originally shown on CBS on December 3, 1972, this movie was actually a very low-budget film produced on videotape instead of 35mm film. John J. O'Connor, the television critic for The New York Times, highly praised the program. In his review, O'Connor observed that "what could have been cloyingly sticky was kept, in an unusually sensitive script by Eleanor Perry, gently perceptive. For one thing, the characterization of Addie did not fall into the Sunnybrook Farm mold typical of most little girls on TV. This one, wearing glasses, made no apologies for being a precocious Miss Know‐It‐All. For another, Paul Bogart's direction was intelligent, helped considerably by fine performances from Jason Robards as the father, Lisa Lucas as Addie and, especially, Mildred Natwick as the grandmother." He summed up his critique by saying "CBS would seem to have another Christmas perennial on its hands." (The New York Times article "TV: 'Tis The Season for Family Entertainment" by John J. O'Connor - December 6, 1972, p. 95). As a result of its critical acclaim and high ratings, the program was repeated several times in the 1970s, on CBS, during the holiday season. The following year, a sequel was presented by CBS on November 18, 1973. The special, entitled The Thanksgiving Treasure featured essentially the same cast with the exception of guest star Barnard Hughes, as James Mills's nemesis Walter Renquist, and Frannie Michel who replaced Alexa Kenin as Addie's best friend.

Once again, O'Connor was impressed with the program. In his review, he wrote "this time around, Addie took her classroom Thanksgiving lesson seriously enough to attempt friendship with one of her father's old enemies, an elderly misanthrope living as a recluse on a nearby farm. After a slow beginning, dawdling too long around school scenes, the hour settled effectively and touchingly on the central relationship of the story. Again, the acting — particularly by the remarkable Miss Lucas — was fine, the photography excellent and the graphics, used as 'bridges' between scenes, were superb." (The New York Times article - "TV: The Holiday Menu" by John J. O'Connor - November 23, 1973, p. 72). It, too, was rebroadcast a few times during the 1970s. After that, two more sequels were produced: The Easter Promise, presented on March 29, 1975 on CBS, featured Jean Simmons; and Addie and The King of Hearts broadcast on CBS on February 25, 1976, featuring Diane Ladd and Richard Hatch. No further installments were produced. In 1991, The House Without a Christmas Tree was released on VHS, and on DVD in 2007.

Each act of the story featured collages that opened and closed it between commercial breaks. The collage artist who assembled these for the story, Norman Sunshine, won an Emmy Award for them. He later assembled other collages for The Thanksgiving Treasure.

The House Without a Christmas Tree was filmed in Uxbridge, Ontario, mainly at the corner of Peel Street and Victoria Drive, where the house and school still exist. They also shot near the downtown core at Church and Brock Street West.

== Awards ==
Eleanor Perry won a Primetime Emmy Award for Outstanding Writing Achievement In Drama Adaptation, and Paul Bogart was nominated for a Directors Guild of America Award.

== Legacy ==
The Christmas show was so successful, it resulted in three other specials with the same cast, all likewise based on books that Gail Rock had written. In all of them, Lisa Lucas appeared as Addie Mills.

- The Thanksgiving Treasure, a Thanksgiving Day special transmitted on November 18, 1973. (On its VHS release, it was retitled The Holiday Treasure.) Patricia Hamilton, providing the voice of the older Addie Mills, narrated this special; she had not been credited in The House Without a Christmas Tree, she was credited here.
- The Easter Promise, an Easter special transmitted on March 26, 1975.
- Addie and the King of Hearts, a Valentine's Day special transmitted on February 25, 1976.

All but the last of these were highly rated and were later released on VHS. Only The House Without a Christmas Tree was still in print as of late October 2012. The original Christmas special is often recommended on a variety of lists, for both holiday viewing and such other themes as about single parents.

On November 4, 2014, the DVD Holiday Family Classics: The Thanksgiving Treasure / The House Without A Christmas Tree was released by Paramount. The release was credited as a two film collection but featured both programs on one DVD (Region 1 only). Soon after, there was another "Holiday Family Classics" DVD released by Paramount which included both The Easter Promise and Addie and the King of Hearts.

== Adaptation ==
Houston Grand Opera commissioned an adaptation from composer Ricky Ian Gordon and librettist Royce Vavrek. The opera premiered on November 30, 2017.

== See also ==
- List of Christmas films
