= Charmian Carr =

American actress (1942–2016)

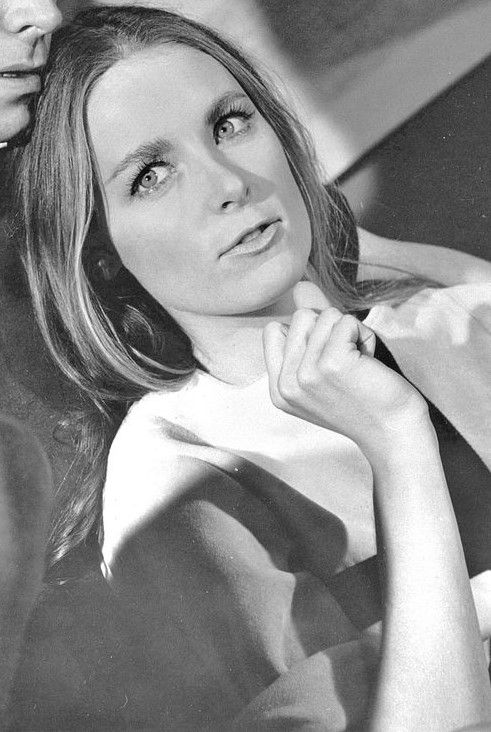
- Carr in Evening Primrose (1966)
- Born: Charmian Anne Farnon; December 27, 1942; Chicago, Illinois, U.S.
- Died: September 17, 2016 (aged 73); Los Angeles, California, U.S.
- Education: San Fernando High School; San Fernando Valley State College
- Occupations: Actress; singer; author; businesswoman
- Years active: 1964–1967
- Known for: Liesl von Trapp in The Sound of Music
- Spouse: Jay Brent (m. 1967; div. 1991)
- Children: 2

Charmian Carr (born Charmian Anne Farnon; December 27, 1942 – September 17, 2016) was an American actress best known for her role as Liesl, the eldest von Trapp daughter in the 1965 film version of The Sound of Music.

== Early life ==
Carr was born Charmian Anne Farnon on December 27, 1942, in Chicago, Illinois, the second child of vaudeville actress Rita Oehmen and musician Brian Farnon. Carr had two sisters, actresses Shannon Farnon and Darleen Carr, and two brothers, Michael and Brian. Her family moved to Los Angeles when Carr was 10. Her parents divorced in 1957 after her father had an affair. Carr's relationship with her father was tumultuous, as was her relationship with her mother, an alcoholic who was spitefully jealous of her daughter's success.

As a student at San Fernando High School, Farnon was a cheerleader and played basketball and volleyball. She graduated in 1960. Before she was signed to be in The Sound of Music, "[s]he had never had a singing lesson and had never tried to act."

== Career ==
=== 1964–1965: The Sound of Music ===
Carr was studying speech therapy and philosophy at San Fernando Valley State College when a friend arranged for her to audition for a role in The Sound of Music. In 1964, Carr related the story behind the tryout:

I was going to college and getting extra spending money by modeling in fashion shows in one of the stores. One of the girls who modeled with me knew that Robert Wise, producer-director of The Sound of Music, had been conducting a four-month search for someone to play the part of 16-year-old Liesl. My friend, without my knowing it, sent in my picture and explained in a note that I sang and danced. I received a call from Mr. Wise to come for a tryout. It took me completely by surprise.

Director Robert Wise thought that Farnon was too long a surname when paired with Charmian. He gave her a list of single-syllable surnames and she chose Carr. She won the role of Liesl von Trapp over Geraldine Chaplin, Kim Darby, Patty Duke, Shelley Fabares, Teri Garr, Mia Farrow, and Lesley Ann Warren. Overall, the film was a happy experience for Carr. However, during the filming of her dance scene with Rolfe Gruber (played by Daniel Truhitte) in the gazebo while performing the musical number "Sixteen Going on Seventeen", the costumers had forgotten to put no-slip pads on Carr's shoes. As a result, she slid through a window of the gazebo, and Carr "had to complete the scene in agony."

=== 1965–2014: Retirement and other ventures ===
In 1965, Carr worked with Van Johnson on a pilot for the television program Take Her, She's Mine. She then appeared in Evening Primrose, a one-hour musical written by Stephen Sondheim which aired on ABC Stage 67 in 1966. That same year, Carr accepted the Golden Globe award for best picture, musical or comedy on behalf of Robert Wise. She retired from acting after getting married in 1967.

Carr owned the interior design firm Charmian Carr Designs in Encino, California, and was Michael Jackson's interior designer for five years. She wrote the books Forever Liesl and Letters to Liesl. Carr reunited with many of her co-stars from The Sound of Music on The Oprah Winfrey Show in October 2010 to celebrate the film's 45th anniversary. In 2014, Carr recorded "Edelweiss" with the great-grandchildren of the von Trapps on the album Dream a Little Dream by the von Trapps and Pink Martini.

== Personal life ==
After finishing The Sound of Music, Carr experienced "several depressed years when I trusted nobody, not knowing if people liked me or wanted to be Liesl's friend." As she got older, Carr came to appreciate the role and participated in events celebrating it. She suffered panic attacks, cold sweats, and a nervous breakdown while working as an interior designer for Michael Jackson; terrified by his odd habits, Carr quit after five years, shortly before he bought Neverland Ranch.

In 1967, Carr married dentist Jay Brent. They had two daughters: Jennifer (born 1970) and Emily (born 1974). At some point, Carr began an affair with childhood sweetheart Gary Oldham after reuniting at a school reunion. This led to her and Brent divorcing in 1991.

Carr died in Los Angeles on September 17, 2016, from complications related to frontotemporal dementia at age 73.

== Filmography ==
Year	Title	Role	Type
1965	The Sound of Music	Liesl von Trapp	Feature film
1965	Take Her, She's Mine		TV-series pilot
1966	Evening Primrose	Ella Harkins	TV-series episode
