= Dayton's Devils =

1968 film by Jack Shea

- Film poster
- Directed by: Jack Shea
- Written by: Fred de Gorter
- Produced by: Robert W. Stabler
- Starring: Rory Calhoun; Leslie Nielsen; Lainie Kazan; Hans Gudegast
- Cinematography: Brick Marquard
- Edited by: Fred W. Berger
- Music by: Marlin Skiles
- Distributed by: Madison
- Release date: 1968
- Running time: 103 minutes
- Country: United States
- Language: English

Dayton's Devils is a1968 American crime film directed by Jack Shea and starring Rory Calhoun and Leslie Nielsen. It was written by Fred de Gorter, and marked the film debut of Lainie Kazan.

== Plot ==
Frank Dayton leads a group of crooks in a caper to steal $2,500,000 from an Air Force base. Dayton is the tough-guy military leader who recruits Mike, ex-Nazi Max sadistic killer Barney Barry, and failed French artist Claude in the scheme.

== Cast ==
- Rory Calhoun as Mike Page
- Leslie Nielsen as Frank Dayton
- Lainie Kazan as Leda Martell
- Hans Gudegast (later known as Eric Braeden) as Max Eikhart
- Barry Sadler as Barney Barry
- Pat Renella as Claude Sadi
- Georg Stanford Brown as Theon Gibson
- Rigg Kennedy as Sonny Merton
- Mike Farrell as naval officer
- Bruce Glover

== Reception ==
Variety wrote: "Jack Shea directs the Fred De Gorter script with some elan and without reverting to the TV-style camera work which has marred some of the previous actioners."

Boxoffice wrote: "Written with both ears on the cliche, and haphazardly directed by Jack Shea, this Commonwealth United release gets off to a sluggish start, but manages to generate some excitement towards the end. ... The performances are standard, while the whole production has the look and sound of a television show."

The Monthly Film Bulletin wrote: "One of the more dispiriting consequences of Hollywood's current concern for the television market is that it is becoming increasingly difficult to distinguish between a feature film intended for theatrical release and an episode from a studio-backed television series. This very routine thriller is a case in point."
