= Theodore Isaac Rubin =

American psychiatrist and author (1923–2019)

- Born: April 11, 1923; Brooklyn, New York City, U.S.
- Died: February 16, 2019 (aged 95); Manhattan, New York City, U.S.
- Occupations: Writer, psychotherapist
- Spouse: Eleanor Katz

Theodore Isaac Rubin (April 11, 1923 – February 16, 2019) was an American psychiatrist and author. Rubin was a past president of the American Institute for Psychoanalysis and the Karen Horney Institute for Psychoanalysis. He lived in New York City and was married to Eleanor Katz.

== Life and career ==
Rubin served in the U.S. Navy during World War II. He was a long-time contributing columnist to the Ladies' Home Journal (1972-?), and the author of more than 25 works of fiction and non-fiction. In 1962, director Frank Perry made the acclaimed film David and Lisa from Rubin's novel "Lisa and David". The film was remade by entertainer Oprah Winfrey in 1998. His book Shrink: The Diary of a Psychiatrist, was written in the times of his residences in different psychiatric hospitals in the West Coast of the United States until his decision to move to New York.

For a clinician who rose to prominence within psychoanalysis during the heyday of what is known as "ego psychology" (a movement often criticized for its equation of mental health and conformity to normative American cultural values, exemplified by the pathologizing of homosexuality), Rubin was iconoclastic with regard to psychoanalytic and cultural orthodoxy. Compassion and Self-Hate: An Alternative to Despair (1975), while espousing traditional psychoanalytic notions of repression and defense, emphasizes the centrality of covert self-hate in the phenomenology of neurotic suffering, recommending consciously invoked compassion, a self-help approach which more closely resembles Tibetan Buddhism than psychoanalysis. This dichotomy can be seen in at least one of two ways: as an opening of the psychoanalytic model to existential and spiritual phenomenology (see Epstein's "Thoughts Without a Thinker" for a recent exposition of the idea that psychoanalysis and Buddhist thought can be productively synchronized), or as an unacknowledged radical interrogation of core psychoanalytic assumptions (see DuQuesne's "Killing Freud" for a thorough discussion of this trend in analytic writing).

Rubin appeared on the April 11, 1966, episode of the game show To Tell the Truth. He was introduced to the audience as a psychologist who counseled people on how to diet and lose weight. Only after he revealed himself did the show's host, Bud Collyer, identify him as a novelist and the author of David and Lisa.

Rubin died on February 16, 2019, at the age of 95.
