= Eleanor Perry =

American screenwriter (1914–1981)

- Born: Eleanor Rosenfeld; October 13, 1914; Cleveland, Ohio, U.S.
- Died: March 14, 1981 (aged 66); New York City, U.S.
- Education: Western Reserve University
- Occupations: screenwriter, novelist
- Spouses: Leo G. Bayer (m. 1937; div. 1958) Frank Perry (m. 1960; div. 1971)
- Children: 2, including William Bayer

Eleanor Perry (née Rosenfeld; nom-de-plume Oliver Weld Bayer, October 13, 1914 – March 14, 1981) was an American screenwriter and author.

Film critic Charles Champlin fondly remembered Perry as one of the feminists who took part in a protest demonstration where red paint was thrown on promotional posters for the film Roma at the 1972 Cannes Film Festival, which consisted of an exaggerated nude photo pun on the Roman foundation myth. The outspoken Eleanor Perry was an advocate for women's rights and screenwriters' recognition, often criticizing the film industry.

== Biography ==
Born to and raised in a Jewish family in Cleveland, Ohio, she attended Western Reserve University, where she wrote for the college's literary magazine. With her first husband, attorney Leo G. Bayer, she wrote a series of suspense novels, including Paper Chase (1942), made into the movie Dangerous Partners in 1945. After earning a master's degree in psychiatric social work, she began to write plays, enjoying Broadway success in 1958 with Third Best Sport, a collaboration with her husband. The two were divorced shortly after.

== Career ==
Before working with Frank Perry, Eleanor had published numerous articles, plays and novels including Third Best Sport, produced on Broadway.

She won an Emmy award for her television screenplay adaptation of Truman Capote's A Christmas Memory. Perry and her then-husband were responsible for 1968's The Swimmer, Diary of a Mad Housewife and the Academy Award-nominated independent film David and Lisa.

Perry was also a journalist and novelist who penned Blue Pages, a semi-autobiographical novel about her time writing screenplays in Hollywood and her marriage to Frank Perry.

In 1977, she was among the first wave of honorees of the Women in Film Crystal Award for outstanding women who, through their endurance and the excellence of their work, have helped to expand the role of women within the entertainment industry. Also in 1977, Perry became an associate of the Women's Institute for Freedom of the Press (WIFP).

== Personal life ==
In 1960, she married aspiring film director Frank Perry, with whom she formed a long-lasting professional partnership. Their first film, the low-budget David and Lisa, for which she drew upon her psychiatric background, earned the couple Academy Award nominations for writing and direction. In 1966, she and Truman Capote adapted his novella A Christmas Memory for the anthology series ABC Stage 67, which earned her the first of two Emmy Awards. The second was for The House Without a Christmas Tree in 1972.

Following her divorce from Perry in 1971, she wrote a roman à clef about her marriage, incorporating many of the problems she faced as a female screenwriter in Hollywood into her 1979 novel Blue Pages. In 1972, she was head of the jury at the 22nd Berlin International Film Festival.

Her son, William Bayer, is a prize-winning crime fiction writer.

== Death ==
On March 14, 1981, Eleanor Perry died of cancer in New York City. Seventeen years after her death, she received screen credit again when her original screenplay of David and Lisa was refilmed for television.

== Awards ==
- Nominee, Best Adapted Screenplay, Academy Awards, David and Lisa (1962)
- Winner, Individual Achievement (Screenplay), Emmy Awards, ABC Stage 67: A Christmas Memory (1966)
- Winner, Best Adapted Screenplay, Emmy Awards, The House Without a Christmas Tree (1972)

== Screenplays ==
- David and Lisa (1961)
- Ladybug Ladybug (1963)
- The Swimmer (1968)
- Last Summer (1969)
- Trilogy (1969)
- The Lady in the Car with Glasses and a Gun (1970)
- Diary of a Mad Housewife (1970)
- The Man Who Loved Cat Dancing (1973)

== Teleplays ==
- Oprah Winfrey Presents: David and Lisa (1998)
- The Thanksgiving Treasure (1973)
- The House Without a Christmas Tree (1972)
- The Thanksgiving Visitor (1967)
- A Christmas Memory for ABC Stage 67 (1966)
