= Flooded Out =

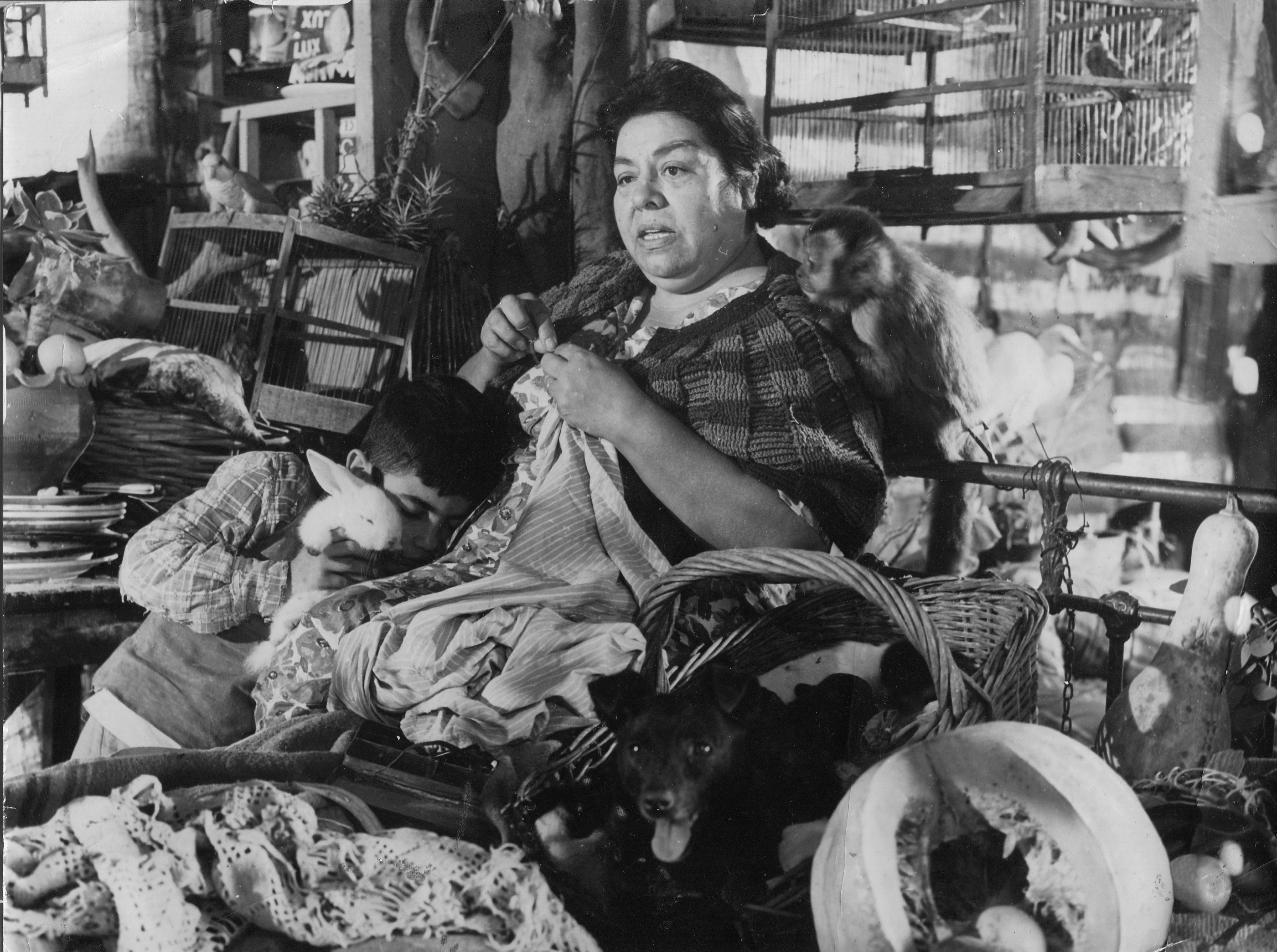
- Spanish: Los inundados
- Directed by: Fernando Birri
- Written by: Mateo Booz (short story); Fernando Birri
- Starring: Pirucho Gómez; Lola Palombo; María Vera
- Cinematography: Adelqui Camuso
- Edited by: Antonio Ripoll
- Production company: Productora América Nuestra
- Release date: 1961
- Running time: 87 min.
- Country: Argentina
- Language: Spanish

Flooded Out (Spanish: Los inundados, lit. The Flooded Ones) is a 1961 Argentine comedy film directed by Fernando Birri.

In a survey of the 100 greatest films of Argentine cinema carried out by the Museo del Cine Pablo Ducrós Hicken in 2000, the film reached the 13th position. In a new version of the survey organized in 2022 by the specialized magazines La vida útil, Taipei and La tierra quema, presented at the Mar del Plata International Film Festival, the film reached the 33rd position.

== Cast ==
- Pirucho Gómez as Dolores Gaitán
- Lola Palombo as Optima Gaitán
- María Vera as Pilar Gaitán
- Hector Palavecino as A member of the Gaitán family
- Julio Omar González as A member of the Gaitán family (credited as Julio González)
- Carlos Rodríguez

== Censorship ==
Because Los Inundados depicted the hardships of poor residents living in areas that are subject to floods, the film was banned in Argentina for being contrary to the national image the federal government wished to promote. The film was screened at the Venice Film Festival in 1962 where it shared the Prima Opera Award with David and Lisa.
