= A Christmas Memory =

Short story by Truman Capote

- First edition in solo book form (1966)
- Author: Truman Capote
- Language: English
- Publisher: Random House
- Publication date: 1956
- Publication place: United States
- Pages: 45
- OCLC: 716694
- Followed by: "The Thanksgiving Visitor"

"A Christmas Memory" is a short story by Truman Capote. Originally published in Mademoiselle magazine in December 1956, it was reprinted in The Selected Writings of Truman Capote in 1963. It was issued in a stand-alone hardcover edition by Random House in 1966, and it has been published in many editions and anthologies since.

The largely autobiographical story, which is set in the early 1930s, describes a period in the lives of the seven-year-old narrator and an elderly woman who is his distant cousin and best friend. The woman was Nanny Faulk, elder sister of the household where Capote's wayward parents deposited him as a young boy. Nanny, whom everyone called Sook, was thought to be developmentally disabled. But Capote later wrote a friend, "I had an elderly cousin, the woman in my story 'A Christmas Memory,' who was a genius."

The evocative narrative focuses on country life, friendship, and the joy of giving during the Christmas season, and it also gently yet poignantly touches on loneliness and loss.

Now a holiday classic, "A Christmas Memory" has been broadcast, recorded, filmed, and staged multiple times, in award-winning productions.

== Plot ==

Brick ruins outline the "spreading old house" in Monroeville, Alabama, that was the boyhood home of Truman Capote and the setting for "A Christmas Memory"

Narrated by an unnamed, seven-year-old boy who is addressed as "Buddy" by his older cousin, "A Christmas Memory" is about the narrator's relationship with his older, unnamed, female cousin, to whom he refers throughout the story only as "my friend." (In later adaptations, she is called Sook.) Buddy and his cousin, who is eccentric and childlike, live in a house with other relatives—who are authoritarian and stern—and have a dog named Queenie.

The family is very poor, but Buddy looks forward to Christmas every year nevertheless, and he and his elderly cousin save their pennies for this occasion. Each year at Christmastime, Buddy and his friend collect pecans and buy other ingredients to make fruitcakes; although set during Prohibition, these include whiskey, which they buy from a scary—but ultimately friendly—Indian bootlegger named Haha Jones. They send the cakes to acquaintances they have met only once or twice, and to people they've never met at all, such as President Franklin Delano Roosevelt.

This year, after the two have finished the elaborate four-day production of making fruitcakes, the elderly cousin decides to celebrate by finishing off the remaining whiskey. This leads to Buddy and his cousin becoming giddy drunk, and the cousin being severely reprimanded by angry relatives for letting Buddy imbibe. She runs off to her room crying, but Buddy follows and comforts her with thoughts of Christmas rituals.

The next day, Buddy and his friend go to a faraway grove, which the elderly cousin has proclaimed the best place, by far, to chop down Christmas trees. They manage to chop and carry home a large and beautiful tree, despite the arduousness of the trek. They spend the following days making decorations for the tree and presents for the relatives, Queenie, and each other. Buddy and the older cousin keep their gifts to each other a secret, and although Buddy knows his friend desperately wishes she could afford to get him a bike, he assumes his friend has made him a kite, as she has every year. He has made her a kite, too.

Come Christmas morning, the two of them are up at the crack of dawn, anxious to open their presents. Buddy is extremely disappointed, having received the rather dismal gifts of old hand-me-downs and a subscription to a religious magazine. His friend has gotten the somewhat better gifts of oranges and hand-knitted scarves. Queenie gets a bone, as she does every year.

Then Buddy and his elderly cousin exchange the handmade kites they made for each other, and she tells him that his kite is her favourite gift that year. In a beautiful, hidden meadow, they fly the kites that day in the clear, winter sky, while eating her Christmas oranges. The elderly cousin feels as though she is in heaven, telling Buddy that God and heaven must look just like this. It turns out to be their last Christmas together.

The following year, Buddy is sent away to military school. Though the two maintain a constant correspondence at first, their exchanges eventually fade as advancing age and dementia take the toll on Buddy's elderly cousin. Soon, she is unable to remember who Buddy is, and not long after, she passes away.

As Buddy says later:

And when that happens, I know it. A message saying so merely confirms a piece of news some secret vein had already received, severing from me an irreplaceable part of myself, letting it loose like a kite on a broken string. That is why, walking across a school campus on this particular December morning, I keep searching the sky. As if I expected to see, rather like hearts, a lost pair of kites hurrying towards heaven.

== Adaptations and recordings ==
=== Television ===
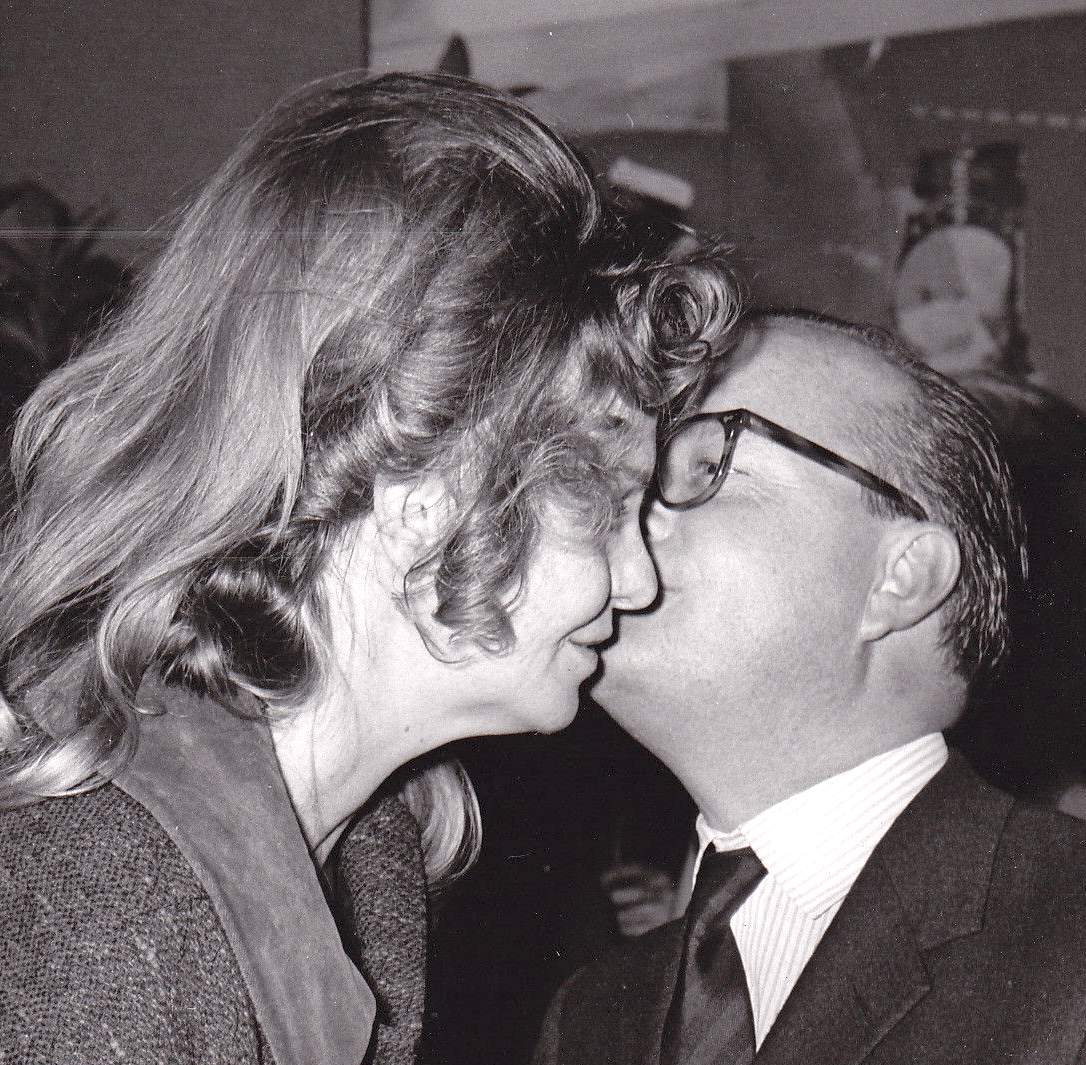
Truman Capote kisses Geraldine Page on the cheek following a preview screening of "A Christmas Memory" on October 28, 1966

"A Christmas Memory" was adapted for television for ABC Stage 67 by Truman Capote and Eleanor Perry. The production starred Geraldine Page and Donnie Melvin, and Truman Capote was the narrator. Both the teleplay and the program's star, Geraldine Page, won Emmy Awards. The production also won a Peabody Award. This production is available on video under such titles as ABC Playhouse 67: A Christmas Memory or Truman Capote's "A Christmas Memory". This version starring Geraldine Page was also released in cinemas by Allied Artists in 1969 as part of Truman Capote's Trilogy.

The story was also adapted for Hallmark television in 1997. This production starred Eric Lloyd as Buddy and Patty Duke as Sook. Eric Lloyd was nominated for a Young Artist Award for Best Performance in a TV Movie/Pilot/Mini-Series – Young Actor Age Ten or Under. This version was criticized as being inferior to the previous film.

The story has also been adapted as part of Short Story Anthology, a 16-part series available from Children's Television International. "A Christmas Memory" comprises episodes 11 and 12 of the series.

=== Recordings ===
For the live-audience Selected Shorts series, broadcast nationally on NPR stations, actor John Shea recorded "A Christmas Memory" in the late 1990s. Shea's sensitive reading was anthologized and sold on cassette, and the anthology, Selected Shorts, Vol. XII, was the winner of AudioFile Magazine's Earphones Award in 1999.

A CD of the story read by Celeste Holm is included in Knopf/Random House's 50th Anniversary 2006 printing of the book.

Truman Capote's own reading of "A Christmas Memory" was recorded in 1959 and issued on LP. An abridged version of the 1959 LP was featured on the NPR radio program This American Life in 2003. Capote was also recorded in 1976 reading the story to a live audience at the University of North Dakota Writers Conference.

=== Theatre ===
In 1991, a musical stageplay adaptation by Malcolm Ruhl and Russell Vandenbroucke, Holiday Memories, was published, which combines both "A Christmas Memory" and "The Thanksgiving Visitor."

In 2010, Capote's "A Christmas Memory" was adapted into a full-length musical by Broadway veterans Larry Grossman (music) and Carol Hall (lyrics). Duane Poole, who had written the original teleplay starring Patty Duke, wrote the musical's book. A Christmas Memory received its world premiere at TheatreWorks in Palo Alto, California on December 4, 2010, starring Broadway veteran, Penny Fuller. The musical had its Off-Broadway premiere at the Irish Repertory Theatre in Manhattan, starring Tony Award-winner Alice Ripley as Sook. It ran November 25, 2014 – January 4, 2015, at the Irish Rep's temporary home, the DR2 Theater in Union Square.

=== Opera ===
In 1992, Capote's "A Christmas Memory" was adapted into a one-act opera by American composer Samuel Jones. The opera was first staged by Gaitley Stevenson-Mathews at the Deep Ellum Opera Theatre in Dallas in December 1992, to critical acclaim. The composer fashioned the libretto from the story and the Eleanor Perry/Truman Capote television screenplay, with their personal approval. The composer also created an orchestral suite from the opera.

== Sequels ==
Truman Capote further explored the lives of Buddy and Sook in his story "The Thanksgiving Visitor," which also was adapted for television. The 1967 television production of The Thanksgiving Visitor earned Geraldine Page a second Emmy Award. Capote's third short story about Buddy and Sook was "One Christmas", published in 1983, and televised in 1994.

== See also ==
- List of Christmas-themed literature
- List of Christmas films
