= ABC Stage 67 =

Television series

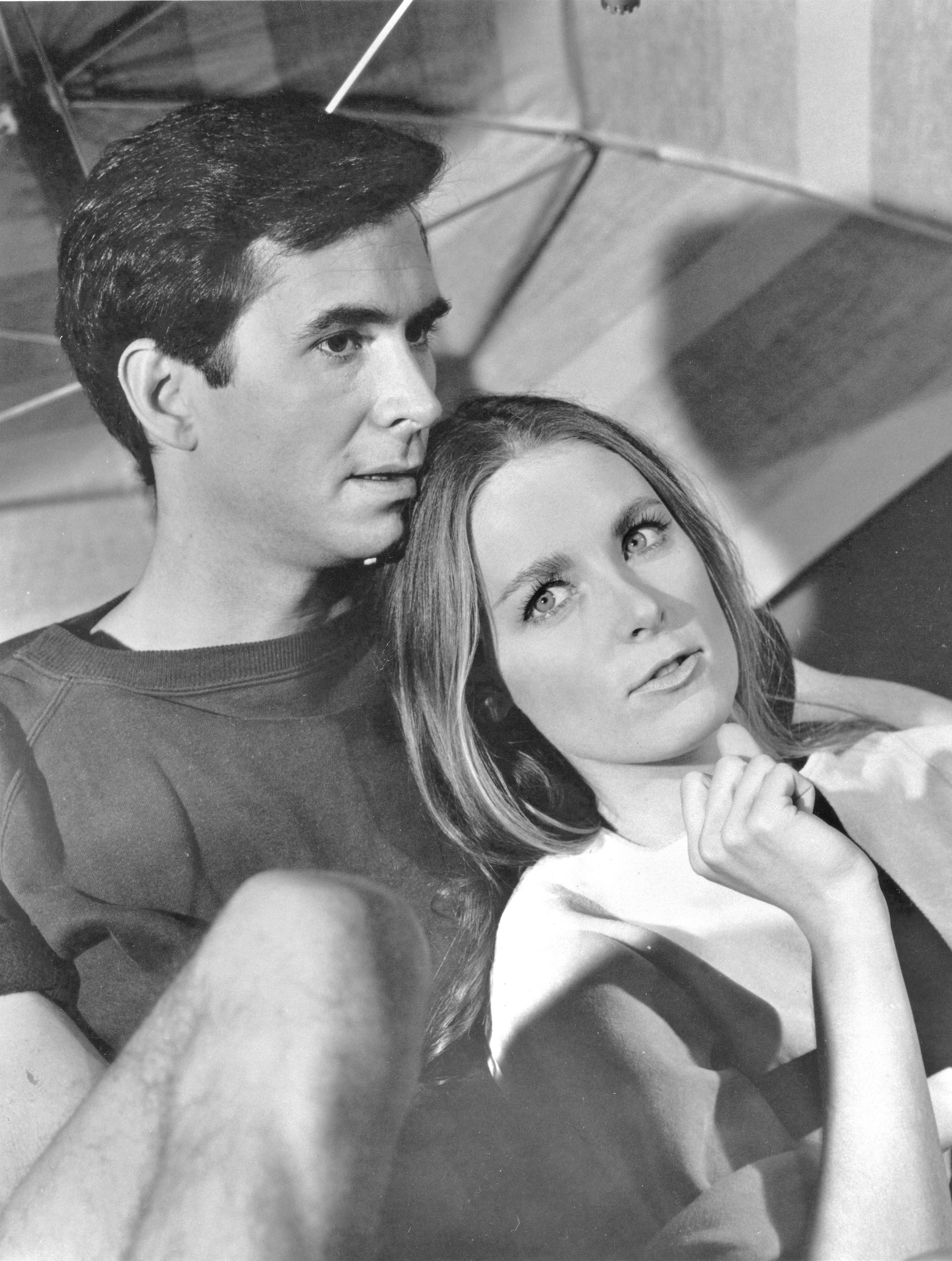
- Anthony Perkins and Charmian Carr in "Evening Primrose", 1966
- Directed by: Sam Peckinpah; Alex Segal; Frank Perry; Paul Bogart; Franklin J. Schaffner
- Theme music composer: Elmer Bernstein
- Country of origin: United States
- Original language: English
- No. of seasons: 1
- No. of episodes: 26

Production
- Running time: 60 minutes
- Production company: Francis Productions

Original release
- Network: ABC
- Release: September 14, 1966 – May 4, 1967

ABC Stage 67 is the umbrella title for a series of 26 weekly American television shows that included dramas, variety shows, documentaries and original musicals.

It premiered on ABC on September 14, 1966, with Murray Schisgal's The Love Song of Barney Kempinski, directed by Stanley Prager and starring Alan Arkin as a man enjoying the sights and sounds of New York City in his last remaining hours of bachelorhood. Arkin was nominated for an Emmy Award for Outstanding Single Performance By An Actor in a Leading Role in a Drama and the program was nominated as Outstanding Dramatic Program.

Later programs included appearances by Petula Clark, Bobby Darin, Sir Laurence Olivier, Albert Finney, Peter Sellers, David Frost and Jack Paar.

Ultimately, ABC's effort to revive the popular anthology series format from the 1950s failed. Scheduled first against I Spy on Wednesdays and then The Dean Martin Show on Thursdays, the show consistently received low ratings. Its last production, an adaptation of Jean Cocteau's one-woman play The Human Voice starring Ingrid Bergman, was shown on May 4, 1967.

== Significant episodes ==
- The Love Song of Barney Kempinski (aired September 14, 1966), a play by Murray Schisgal starring Alan Arkin (nominated for an Emmy for his performance), Lee Grant, John Gielgud, and Alan King.
- Dare I Weep, Dare I Mourn? (aired September 21, 1966), a play by Stanley Mann based on a story by John Le Carré starring James Mason and Hugh Griffith.
- The Kennedy Wit (aired October 5, 1966) featured Jack Paar discussing John F. Kennedy's speeches with David Powers, who served as Special Assistant to the President in the White House and was the original curator of the Kennedy Library.
- Olympus 7-0000 (aired October 12, 1966), a musical comedy by Richard Adler and featuring Larry Blyden, Donald O'Connor and Phyllis Newman. A coach attempts to organize a professional football team.
- The Confession (aired October 19, 1966), a drama starring Brandon deWilde, Dana Elcar, Hugh Franklin, Katharine Houghton, Arthur Kennedy, and Byron Sanders.
- The Canterville Ghost (aired November 2, 1966), an original musical version of the Oscar Wilde tale with a score by Jerry Bock and Sheldon Harnick and a script by Burt Shevelove. It starred Michael Redgrave, Douglas Fairbanks Jr., Peter Noone and Frankie Howerd.
- The People Trap (aired November 9, 1966), a teleplay by Earl Hamner Jr. from a treatment by Robert Sheckley, with a diverse cast including Lew Ayres, Pearl Bailey, Betty Furness, Lee Grant, Phil Harris, Mercedes McCambridge, Vera Miles, the baseball player Jackie Robinson, Cesar Romero, Mort Sahl, Connie Stevens and Estelle Winwood.
- Evening Primrose (aired November 16, 1966), an original musical (based on the John Collier short story, with a book by James Goldman and a score by Stephen Sondheim) about a poet who opts to drop out of society and live in a department store. It was directed by Paul Bogart and starred Anthony Perkins, Charmian Carr, and Dorothy Stickney. The program was taped after regular business hours at the now-defunct Stern Brothers department store in Manhattan. A studio recording with Neil Patrick Harris in the Perkins role was released in 2001. This episode is available for viewing at the Museum of Television & Radio branches in New York City and Beverly Hills. This episode has been released on DVD.
- The Legend of Marilyn Monroe (aired November 30, 1966), a documentary about the film star narrated by John Huston. The episode has been released on DVD.
- On the Flip Side (aired December 7, 1966), an original rock musical, with songs by Burt Bacharach and Hal David, about a teen idol has-been portrayed by Ricky Nelson. Joanie Sommers co-starred. An original soundtrack album was released by Decca Records.
- The Brave Rifles, a documentary about World War II. It has been nominated for a 1965 Academy Award for Best Documentary Short
- A Christmas Memory (aired December 21, 1966), an adaptation of Truman Capote's semi-autobiographical novella, won a Peabody Award and Emmy Awards for Capote and Eleanor Perry's teleplay and Geraldine Page's leading performance.
- Sex in the Sixties (aired January 12, 1967), a documentary about the changing sexual mores of the decade, included discussions with William Masters and Virginia E. Johnson, authors of Human Sexual Response, and Playboy's Hugh Hefner.
- C'est La Vie (aired February 23, 1967), a musical review of Broadway and film songs. Hosted by Maurice Chevalier and Diahann Carroll.
- The Light Fantastic (aired February 9, 1967), a lighthearted look at the influence of dance on society with Lauren Bacall and John Forsythe.
- Rodgers and Hart Today (aired March 2, 1967, rerun on May 11, 1967), a salute to Richard Rodgers and Lorenz Hart hosted by Petula Clark and Bobby Darin, with Quincy Jones as musical director. Guests included the Mamas & the Papas, the Supremes, Count Basie and his Orchestra, and Peter Gennaro and his dancers. The show was unique in that it included not one word of dialogue.
- The American Boy (aired March 9, 1967) was a trio of films about adolescent boys living in the city, the suburbs, and the country. One of the three, Skaterdater, had been nominated for a 1965 Academy Award as Best Live Action Short, and was the winner of nine international film festival awards, including the Palme D'Or at Cannes.
- I'm Getting Married (aired March 16, 1967), a musical satire by Betty Comden, Adolph Green and Jule Styne. The two-character story features Dick Shawn as an up-and-coming businessman who is about to marry Anne Bancroft but can only focus on getting ahead in his career.
- A Time For Laughter: A Look at Negro Humor in America (aired April 6, 1967) was a showcase for African-American performers produced by Harry Belafonte and featuring Godfrey Cambridge, Diahann Carroll, Dick Gregory, Richard Pryor, George Kirby, Redd Foxx, and Moms Mabley (in her television debut). It was nominated for an Emmy as Outstanding Variety Program.
- The Human Voice (aired May 4, 1967) was an adaptation of Jean Cocteau's 1930 one-woman play about a woman's conversation with her former lover. It starred Ingrid Bergman and was directed by Canadian director Ted Kotcheff. Bergman had previously released a commercial recording of the play on Caedmon Records in 1960.

=== Unaired episode ===
A behind the scenes documentary of a May 1966 British concert tour by the musician Bob Dylan was promoted by the network as a forthcoming episode. Eat the Document, as the film was later titled, was never shown as part of the series. Editing delays and an un-television "art house" choice of camera technique are believed to be the reasons.
