= Horizon Pictures =

UK film production company

Horizon Pictures (GB) Ltd was a film production company founded in the United Kingdom by Sam Spiegel and John Huston in 1947. The company produced The African Queen, starring Humphrey Bogart and Katharine Hepburn, in 1951, after which Huston left the company.

It later produced the David Lean films The Bridge on the River Kwai (1957) and Lawrence of Arabia (1962), both of which won the Academy Award for Best Picture.

Other productions included The Night of the Generals (1967), The Swimmer (1968) and Nicholas and Alexandra (1971).
