= Frank Perry =

American film director (1930–1995)

- Born: Frank Joseph Perry Jr. August 21, 1930; New York City, New York, U.S.
- Died: August 29, 1995 (aged 65); New York City, New York, U.S.
- Education: University of Miami
- Alma mater: The Actors Studio; University of Miami
- Occupations: Director; filmmaker
- Years active: 1955–1992
- Employer: Westport Country Playhouse
- Spouses: Eleanor Rosenfeld (m. 1958; div. 1971) Barbara Goldsmith (m. 1977; div. 1992) Virginia Brush Ford (m. 1992)
- Relatives: Katy Perry (niece)

Frank Joseph Perry Jr. (August 21, 1930 – August 29, 1995) was an American stage director and filmmaker. His 1962 independent film David and Lisa earned an Academy Award nomination for Best Director and Best Adapted Screenplay (written by his then-wife Eleanor Perry). The couple collaborated on five more films, including The Swimmer, Diary of a Mad Housewife, and the Emmy Award–nominated A Christmas Memory, based on a short story by Truman Capote. Perry went on to form Corsair Pictures, privately financed by United Artists Theatres, which produced Miss Firecracker and A Shock to the System, then folded. His later films include Mommie Dearest and the documentary On the Bridge, about his dealing with prostate cancer.

== Early life ==
Frank Joseph Perry Jr. was born in New York City to stockbroker Frank Joseph Perry Sr. (1907–1970) and Pauline E. Schwab (1909–1965), who worked at Alcoholics Anonymous. As a teenager, Frank Jr. began pursuing his interest in the theater with a job as a parking lot attendant for the Westport Country Playhouse in nearby Westport, Connecticut. He attended the University of Miami. Frank also studied under Lee Strasberg in New York. He produced several plays at Westport Country Playhouse and then turned for a time to producing television documentaries.

== Career ==
A veteran of the Korean War, he returned to the entertainment industry after being discharged and made his directorial debut in 1962 with the low-budget drama film David and Lisa. Based on the novel by Theodore Isaac Rubin, the screenplay was written by his wife, Eleanor Rosenfeld, who received a nomination for an Academy Award for Writing Adapted Screenplay. A character study of two emotionally disturbed teenagers, the film was successful at the box office and met with much critical acclaim, earning him a nomination for an Academy Award for Directing. Both Perrys would eventually join the select group of non-actors awarded membership in Actors Studio. Perry went on to direct and produce a number of films, many based on literary sources or with strong literary associations, including The Swimmer, (1968) based on a John Cheever story, Last Summer (1969), and Trilogy (1969), written by Truman Capote.

Perry is known for his character studies, such as Diary of a Mad Housewife (1970). That film earned a Best Actress Oscar nomination for Carrie Snodgress, and Play It as It Lays (1972), starring Tuesday Weld, brought her a Golden Globe Best Actress nomination. Both of these films Perry produced and directed, but he is probably best remembered for directing the biographical drama Mommie Dearest, an adaptation of a biography by actress Joan Crawford's adoptive daughter. The film became a cult classic despite mixed reviews from critics; it also won the Razzie Award for worst picture, and Frank Perry was nominated for worst director, while actress Faye Dunaway received the Razzie for her performance.

Some of Perry's film-related material and personal papers are held at the Wesleyan University Cinema Archives, a collection to which scholars and media experts from around the world today have full access.

== Personal life and death ==
In 1958, Frank married his first wife Eleanor Rosenfeld. They collaborated on many screen projects, including screenwriting the Academy Award-nominated 1962 David and Lisa (an adaptation of the novella of the same name) which came about due to Eleanor's daughter Ann bringing the novella to her mother's attention. They divorced in 1971 on grounds of incompatibility. In 1978, Eleanor Perry wrote the novel Blue Pages, based on their relationship. She died of cancer two years later, at age 66.

In 1977, Perry married Barbara Goldsmith, founding editor of New York magazine and book author (Little Gloria...Happy at Last), whom he divorced in 1992. Soon after, he married his Aspen ski instructor, 22-years-younger Virginia Brush Ford, on June 15, 1992.

His half-sister is pastor Mary Christine Hudson (née Perry), the wife of pastor Maurice Keith Hudson and mother of singers Katy Perry and David Hudson.

Perry died of prostate cancer on August 29, 1995, eight days after his 65th birthday, at Memorial Sloan Kettering Cancer Center in Manhattan. His final film, On the Bridge (1992), is an autobiographical documentary about his illness. His ashes were scattered on the mountains of Aspen, Colorado, where he lived the last three years of his life.

== Filmography ==
=== Film ===
Title	Year	Credited as			Production Company	Distributor
Title	Year	Director	Producer	Writer	Production Company	Distributor
David and Lisa	1962	Yes	No	No	Lisa and David Company	Continental Distributing
Ladybug Ladybug	1963	Yes	Yes	No	Francis Productions	United Artists
The Swimmer	1968	Yes	Yes	No	Horizon Pictures	Columbia Pictures
Last Summer	1969	Yes	Yes	No	Francis Productions	Allied Artists
Trilogy	1969	Yes	Yes	No	Francis Productions	Allied Artists
Diary of a Mad Housewife	1970	Yes	Yes	No	Frank Perry Films	Universal Pictures
Doc	1971	Yes	Yes	No	Frank Perry Films	United Artists
Play It as It Lays	1972	Yes	Yes	No	Frank Perry Films	Universal Pictures
Man on a Swing	1974	Yes	No	No	Jaffilms	Paramount Pictures
Rancho Deluxe	1975	Yes	No	No	Elliott Kastner Productions	United Artists
Mommie Dearest	1981	Yes	No	Yes	Frank Yablans Presentations	Paramount Pictures
Monsignor	1982	Yes	No	No	Frank Yablans Presentations	20th Century Fox
Compromising Positions	1985	Yes	Yes	No	C.P. Productions	Paramount Pictures
Hello Again	1987	Yes	Yes	No	Touchstone Pictures	Buena Vista Pictures
Miss Firecracker	1989	No	Yes	No	Corsair Pictures	Corsair Pictures
A Shock to the System	1990	No	Yes	No	Corsair Pictures	Corsair Pictures
On the Bridge	1992	Yes	Yes	Yes	Frank Perry Films	Frank Perry Films

=== Television ===
Series	Episode	Year	Credited as		Production Company	Network
Series	Episode	Year	Director	Producer	Production Company	Network
Playwright at Work	All episodes	1961	No	Yes		National Educational Television and Radio Center
ABC Stage 67	"A Christmas Memory"	1966	Yes	Yes	Francis Productions	American Broadcasting Company
TV movie	Among the Paths to Eden	1967	Yes	Yes	Francis Productions	American Broadcasting Company
TV movie	The Thanksgiving Visitor	1967	Yes	Yes	Francis Productions	American Broadcasting Company
TV movie	Miriam	1970	Yes	Yes	Francis Productions	American Broadcasting Company
TV movie	Dummy	1979	Yes	No	The Königsberg Company	Columbia Broadcasting System
Skag	"Pilot"	1980	Yes	No	Lorimar Productions	National Broadcasting Company
TV movie	J.F.K.: A One-Man Show	1984	Yes	No	Public Broadcasting Service	Public Broadcasting Service
