= Lisa Lucas =

American actress

Lisa Lucas (born 1961) is an American former child actress best known for her role as "Addie Mills" in the Emmy-winning Christmas television special, The House Without a Christmas Tree.

== Career ==
Lucas also played Shirley MacLaine's daughter in the 1977 film The Turning Point, and Jill Clayburgh's daughter in 1978 film An Unmarried Woman. In its review of An Unmarried Woman, The Washington Post said the part of the daughter was "smartly embodied by sharp-featured young actress Lisa Lucas" and Lucas was nominated for the New York Film Critics Circle Award for Best Supporting Actress. Lucas also had roles in the films Hadley's Rebellion (1983) and Heart and Souls (1993), the 1976 PBS series The Adams Chronicles and the 1980 television film A Perfect Match. In 2002, Lucas appeared in a Denver stage production of Cat on a Hot Tin Roof.

== Filmography ==
=== Film ===
Year	Title	Role	Notes
1977	The Turning Point	Jania	
1978	An Unmarried Woman	Patti	
1983	Hadley's Rebellion	Linda Johnson	
1986	Jake Speed	Girlfriend #1	
1993	Heart and Souls	Eva Reilly	

=== Television ===
Year	Title	Role	Notes
1972	The House Without a Christmas Tree	Addie Mills	Television film
1973	The Thanksgiving Treasure	Addie Mills	Television film
1974	The Migrants	Molly Barlow	Television film
1975	The Easter Promise	Addie Mills	Television film
1976	The Adams Chronicles	Abigail Adams Smith	6 episodes
1976	Addie and the King of Hearts	Addie Mills	Television film
1980	A Perfect Match	Julie Larson	Television film
1982	The Facts of Life	Annie	Episode: "The Source"
1982	Forbidden Love	Pamela	Television film
1983	Family Ties	Sherry Marshall	Episode: "Sherry Baby"
1983	The Powers of Matthew Star	Christianne	Episode: "Brain Drain"
