= Geraldine Page on screen and stage =

List of appearances of Geraldine Page on film, TV & stage

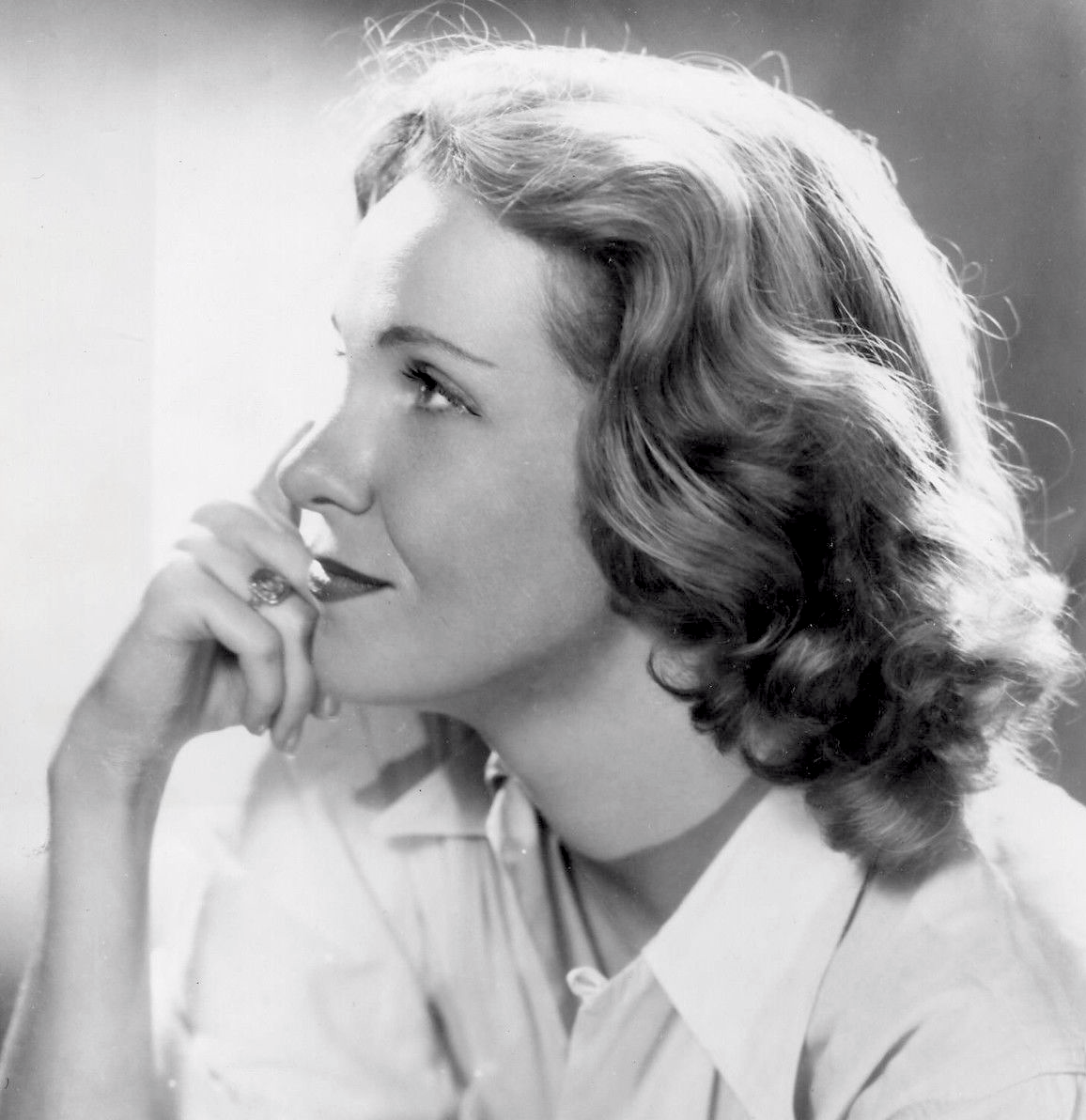
Geraldine Page c. 1950s

Geraldine Page (November 22, 1924 – June 13, 1987) was an American actress who earned critical recognition as a stage actress on Broadway as well as in feature films and television. Over the course of her career, which spanned over three decades, Page earned a total of eight Academy Award nominations, three Emmy nominations, and four Tony nominations. She won the Academy Award for Best Actress for her performance in The Trip to Bountiful (1985).

== Screen ==
=== Film ===
Year	Title	Role	Director(s)	Notes	Ref.
1953	Taxi	Florence Albert	Gregory Ratoff	Uncredited	
1953	Hondo	Angie Lowe	John Farrow		
1961	Summer and Smoke	Alma Winemiller	Peter Glenville		
1962	Sweet Bird of Youth	Alexandra Del Lago	Richard Brooks		
1963	Toys in the Attic	Carrie Berniers	George Roy Hill		
1964	Dear Heart	Evie Jackson	Delbert Mann		
1966	You're a Big Boy Now	Margaret Chanticleer	Francis Ford Coppola		
1966	The Three Sisters	Olga	Paul Bogart		
1967	Monday's Child	Carol Richardson	Leopoldo Torre Nilsson		
1967	The Happiest Millionaire	Mrs. Duke	Norman Tokar		
1969	What Ever Happened to Aunt Alice?	Claire Marrable	Lee H. Katzin		
1969	Trilogy	Sook	Frank Perry	Segment: "A Christmas Memory"	
1971	The Beguiled	Martha Farnsworth	Don Siegel		
1971	J. W. Coop	Mama	Cliff Robertson		
1972	Pete 'n' Tillie	Gertrude Wilson	Martin Ritt		
1973	Happy as the Grass Was Green	Anna Witmer	Charles Davis		
1975	The Day of the Locust	Big Sister	John Schlesinger		
1977	Nasty Habits	Sister Walburga	Michael Lindsay-Hogg		
1977	The Rescuers	Madame Medusa	Wolfgang Reitherman, John Lounsbery, & Art Stevens	Voice	
1978	Interiors	Eve	Woody Allen		
1981	Harry's War	'Aunt' Beverly Payne	Kieth Merrill		
1981	Honky Tonk Freeway	Sister Mary Clarise	John Schlesinger		
1982	I'm Dancing as Fast as I Can	Jean Scott Martin	Jack Hofsiss		
1984	The Pope of Greenwich Village	Mrs. Ritter	Stuart Rosenberg		
1985	The Bride	Mrs. Baumann	Franc Roddam		
1985	Walls of Glass	Mama	Scott D. Goldstein		
1985	White Nights	Anne Wyatt	Taylor Hackford		
1985	The Trip to Bountiful	Mrs. Watts	Peter Masterson		
1986	My Little Girl	Molly	Connie Kaiserman		
1986	Native Son	Peggy	Jerrold Freeman		
1987	Riders to the Sea	Maurya	Ronan O'Leary	(final film role)	

=== Television ===
Year	Title	Role	Notes
1952	Lux Video Theatre	Neighbor	Episode: "The Lesson"
1952	Studio One		Episode: "The Shadowy Third"
1952	Robert Montgomery Presents		Episode: "The Fall Guy"
1954	The Philco Television Playhouse		Episode: "Miss Look-Alike"
1955	Omnibus	Governess	Episode: "The Turn of the Screw"
1955	Windows	The Woman Alcoholic	Episode: "A Domestic Dilemma"
1955	Matinee Theatre	Miss Myrtle	Episode: "An Apple for Miss Myrtle"
1955	The United States Steel Hour	Marian	Episode: "Shoot It Again"
1957	The United States Steel Hour	Estelle	Episode: "The Hill Wife"
1957	Kraft Television Theatre		Episode: "Fire and Ice"
1958	General Electric Theater	Heddie	Episode: "No Hiding Place"
1958	Playhouse 90	Florry / Addie	Episode: "Portrait of a Murderer"; Episode: "The Old Man"
1959	NBC Sunday Showcase	Virginia Reed	Episode: "People Kill People Sometimes"
1966	Barefoot in Athens	Xantippe	Television film
1966	The Long, Hot Summer	Maribelle Kirkpatrick	Episode: "Evil Angel"
1966	ABC Stage 67	Woman	Episode: "A Christmas Memory"
1967	The Thanksgiving Visitor	Miss Sook	Television film
1969	NBC Children's Theatre	Narrator	Episode: "Little Women"
1971	The Name of the Game	Sister Lucia	Episode: "A Sister from Napoli"
1971	Montserrat	Felisa	Television film
1972	Look Homeward, Angel	Eliza Grant	Television film
1972	Medical Center	Ellen Davis	Episode: "Betrayed"
1972	Ghost Story	Hattie	Episode: "Touch of Madness"
1972	Night Gallery	Frances Turchin & Mrs. Evans	Segment: "Stop Killing Me"; Segment: "The Sins of the Fathers"
1972	Two by Chekhov		Part of Hollywood Television Theatre
1973	Night Gallery	Molly Wheatland	Episode: "Something in the Woodwork"
1973	The Snoop Sisters	Olivia Cunningham	Episode: "Corpse and Robbers"
1974	Live Again, Die Again	Mrs. O'Neill	Television film
1976	Kojak	Edna Morrison	Episode: "A Shield for Murder - Part 1"; Episode: "A Shield for Murder - Part 2"
1977	Hawaii Five-O	Philomena Underwood	Episode: "The Descent of the Torches"
1977	Something for Joey	Ann Cappelletti	Television film
1982	The Blue and the Gray	Mrs. Lovelace	Television miniseries (3 episodes)
1983	Loving	Amelia Whitley	Episode: "Pilot"
1984	The Parade	Sarah	Television film
1984	The Dollmaker	Mrs. Kendrick	Television film
1985	The Hitchhiker	Lynette 'Mama' Powers	Episode: "W.G.O.D"
1986	American Playhouse	Sally Phelps	Episode: "Adventures of Huckleberry Finn - Part I"
1986	Nazi Hunter: The Beate Klarsfeld Story	Itta Halaunbrenner	Television film

== Stage roles ==
Year(s)	Title	Role	Venue(s)	No. of performances	Notes	Ref.
1945	Seven Mirrors		Blackfriars Repertory Theatre (New York City)	23		
1952	Yerma		Circle in the Square Theatre	—N/a		
1952	Summer and Smoke	Alma Winemiller	Circle in the Square Theatre	—N/a		
1953	Mid-Summer	Lily	Vanderbilt Theatre	109	Broadway	
1954	The Immoralist	Marcelline	Royale Theatre	96	Broadway	
1954	The Rainmaker	Liz Curry	Cort Theatre	125	Broadway	
1956	The Innkeepers	Amy McGregor	John Golden Theatre	4	Broadway	
1957	Separate Tables	Mrs. Shankland	Music Box Theatre	332	Broadway (replacement)	
1959–60	Sweet Bird of Youth	Princess Kosmonopolis	Martin Beck Theatre	375	Broadway	
1963	Strange Interlude	Nina Leeds	Hudson Theatre; Martin Beck Theatre	97	Broadway	
1964	The Three Sisters	Olga / Masha (Note: Page was originally cast as Olga, and would later serve as a replacement for the role of Masha.)	Morosco Theatre	119	Broadway	
1964	P.S. I Love You	Julie Cunningham	Henry Miller's Theatre	12	Broadway	
1966	The Great Indoors	Oriane Brice	Eugene O'Neill Theatre	7	Broadway	
1967	Black Comedy / White Lies	Clea / Baroness Lemberg	Ethel Barrymore Theatre	337	Broadway	
1968	The Little Foxes	Regina Giddens	Hanna Theatre (Cleveland, Ohio) et al.	—N/a	Touring production	
1969	Angela	Angela Palmer	Music Box Theatre	4	Broadway	
1973	Look Away	Mary Todd Lincoln	Playhouse Theatre	1	Broadway	
1974	Absurd Person Singular	Marion	Music Box Theatre	591	Broadway	
1976	A Streetcar Named Desire	Blanche DuBois	Academy Festival Theatre (Lake Forest, Illinois)	—N/a		
1977	Creditors / The Stronger	Tekla / Mlle. Y	Joseph Papp Public Theatre	—N/a	Off-Broadway	
1978	The Little Foxes	Regina Giddens	Academy Festival Theatre (Lake Forest, Illinois)	—N/a		
1979	Slightly Delayed		The Cape Playhouse (Dennis, Massachusetts); Westport Playhouse (Westport, Connecticut)	—N/a		
1980	Clothes for a Summer Hotel	Zelda Fitzgerald	Cort Theatre	15	Broadway	
1980	Mixed Couples	Elberta	Brooks Atkinson Theatre	9	Broadway	
1982	Agnes of God	Mother Miriam Ruth	Music Box Theatre	599	Broadway	
1983	Inheritors	Isabel Fejevary	The Real Stage (New York City)	—N/a		
1983	Paradise Lost	Clara Gordon	The Mirror Theatre	—N/a		
1984	Rain	Mrs. Horn	Theatre at St. Peter's Church	—N/a		
1984	Agnes of God	Mother Miriam Rush	The Cape Playhouse (Dennis, Massachusetts)	—N/a		
1985	The Madwoman of Chaillot	Countess Aurelia	Theatre at St. Peter's Church	—N/a	Off-Broadway	
1985	Clarence	Mrs. Wheeler	Theatre at St. Peter's Church	—N/a	Off-Broadway	
1985	Vivat! Vivat Regina!	Elizabeth I	Theatre at St. Peter's Church	—N/a	Off-Broadway	
1985	A Lie of the Mind	Lorraine	Promenade Theatre	—N/a	Off-Broadway	
1986	The Circle	Lady Catherine Champion-Cheney	Theatre at St. Peter's Church; Citicorp Center	—N/a	Off-Broadway	
1987	Blithe Spirit	Madame Arcati	Neil Simon Theatre	—N/a	Broadway; final role	

== See also ==
- List of awards and nominations received by Geraldine Page

== Works cited ==
- Banham, Martin (1995). The Cambridge Guide to Theatre. Cambridge: Cambridge University Press. ISBN 978-0-521-43437-9.
- Carroll, Joseph (2013). "Geraldine Page". In Senelick, Laurence (ed.). Theatre Arts on Acting. Routledge. ISBN 978-1-134-72375-1.
- Christensen, Lawrence O.; Foley, William E.; Kremer, Gary (1999). Dictionary of Missouri Biography. Columbia, Missouri: University of Missouri Press. ISBN 978-0-826-26016-1.
- Liebman, Roy (2017). Broadway Actors in Films, 1894–2015. Jefferson, North Carolina: McFarland. ISBN 978-1-476-62615-4.
- Muir, John Kenneth (2001). Terror Television: American Series, 1970-1999. Jefferson, North Carolina: McFarland. ISBN 978-0-786-40890-0.
- Nathan, George J. (1974). Angoff, Charles (ed.). The Theatre Book of the Year, 1945-1946. Farleigh Dickinson University Press. ISBN 978-0-838-61174-6.
- Pugh, Tison (2014). Truman Capote: A Literary Life at the Movies. Athens, Georgia: University of Georgia Press. ISBN 978-0-820-34709-7.
- Thise, Mark (2008). Hollywood Winners & Losers A to Z. Wisconsin: Hal Leonard Corporation. ISBN 978-0-879-10351-4.
