= List of awards and nominations received by Geraldine Page =

Geraldine Page awards and nominations
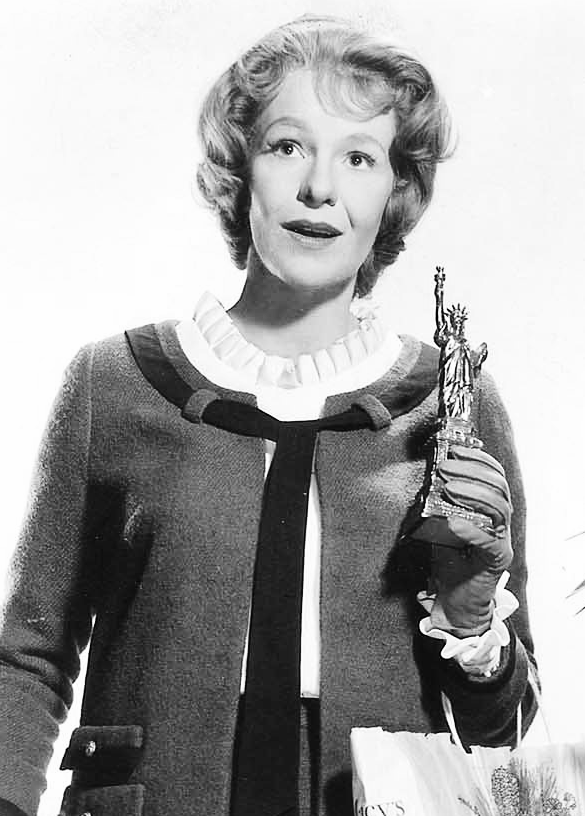
- Page in 1964
| Award | Wins | Nominations |
Totals
| Academy Awards | 1 | 8 |
| BAFTA Awards | 1 | 2 |
| David di Donatello Awards | 1 | 1 |
| Golden Globe Awards | 2 | 9 |
| Independent Spirit Awards | 1 | 1 |
| Laurel Awards | 0 | 1 |
| National Board of Review | 2 | 2 |
| Primetime Emmy Awards | 2 | 3 |
| Tony Awards | 0 | 4 |
| Venice Film Festival | 1 | 1 |
| Boaton Society of Film Critics | 1 | 1 |
| Kansas City Film Critics Circle | 1 | 1 |
| Los Angeles Film Critics Association | 0 | 1 |
| New York Film Critics Circle | 0 | 2 |
| Wins | 13 |
| Nominations | 37 |

Geraldine Page (November 22, 1924 – June 13, 1987) was an American film, stage, and television actress. Over the course of her career, she earned seven Academy Awards nominations, before winning the award for Best Actress for her performance in The Trip to Bountiful (1985). Among her numerous awards and nominations, she earned two Golden Globe Awards and four Tony Award nominations.

== Major associations ==
=== Academy Awards ===
| Year | Category | Nominated work | Result | Ref. |
|---|---|---|---|---|
| 1953 | Best Supporting Actress | Hondo | Nominated | |
| 1961 | Best Actress | Summer and Smoke | Nominated | |
| 1962 | Best Actress | Sweet Bird of Youth | Nominated | |
| 1966 | Best Supporting Actress | You're a Big Boy Now | Nominated | |
| 1972 | Best Supporting Actress | Pete 'n' Tillie | Nominated | |
| 1978 | Best Actress | Interiors | Nominated | |
| 1984 | Best Supporting Actress | The Pope of Greenwich Village | Nominated | |
| 1985 | Best Actress | The Trip to Bountiful | Won | |

=== BAFTA Awards ===
| Year | Category | Nominated work | Result | Ref. |
British Academy Film Awards
| 1963 | Best Foreign Actress (Note: Lost to Anne Bancroft (The Miracle Worker)) | Sweet Bird of Youth | Nominated | |
| 1978 | Best Actress in a Supporting Role | Interiors | Won | |

=== Golden Globe Awards ===
| Year | Category | Nominated work | Result | Ref. |
|---|---|---|---|---|
| 1961 | Best Actress – Motion Picture Drama | Summer and Smoke | Won | |
| 1962 | Best Actress – Motion Picture Drama | Sweet Bird of Youth | Won | |
| 1963 | Best Actress – Motion Picture Drama | Toys in the Attic | Nominated (Note: Lost to Leslie Caron (The L-Shaped Room)) | |
| 1965 | Best Actress – Motion Picture Drama | Dear Heart | Nominated (Note: Lost to Anne Bancroft (The Pumpkin Eater)) | |
| 1966 | Best Supporting Actress | You're a Big Boy Now | Nominated (Note: Lost to Jocelyne LaGarde (Hawaii)) | |
| 1972 | Best Supporting Actress | Pete 'n' Tillie | Nominated (Note: Lost to Shelley Winters (The Poseidon Adventure)) | |
| 1978 | Best Actress – Motion Picture Drama | Interiors | Nominated (Note: Lost to Jane Fonda (Coming Home)) | |
| 1985 | Best Actress – Motion Picture Drama | The Trip to Bountiful | Nominated (Note: Lost to Whoopi Goldberg (The Color Purple)) | |
| 1986 | Best Supporting Actress – Series, Miniseries or Television Film | Nazi Hunter: The Beate Klarsfeld Story | Nominated (Note: Lost to Olivia de Havilland (Anastasia: The Mystery of Anna)) | |

=== Emmy Awards ===
| Year | Category | Nominated work | Result | Ref. |
Primetime Emmy Awards
| 1958 | Best Single Performance by an Actress (Note: Lost to Julie Harris (Hallmark Hall of Fame, Episode: "Little Moon of Alban")) | Playhouse 90 (Episode: "The Old Man") | Nominated | |
| 1967 | Outstanding Single Performance by a Leading Actress | ABC Stage 67 (Episode: "A Christmas Memory") | Won | |
| 1969 | Outstanding Single Performance by a Leading Actress | The Thanksgiving Visitor | Won | |

=== Tony Awards ===
| Year | Category | Nominated work | Result | Ref. |
|---|---|---|---|---|
| 1960 | Best Leading Actress in a Play | Sweet Bird of Youth | Nominated | |
| 1975 | Best Supporting or Featured Actress in a Play | Absurd Person Singular | Nominated | |
| 1982 | Best Leading Actress in a Play | Agnes of God | Nominated | |
| 1987 | Best Leading Actress in a Play | Blithe Spirit | Nominated | |

== Miscellaneous awards ==
=== David di Donatello Awards ===
| Year | Category | Nominated work | Result | Ref. |
|---|---|---|---|---|
| 1962 | Best Foreign Actress | Sweet Bird of Youth | Won | |

=== Independent Spirit Awards ===
| Year | Category | Nominated work | Result | Ref. |
|---|---|---|---|---|
| 1985 | Best Female Lead | The Trip to Bountiful | Won | |

=== Laurel Awards ===
| Year | Category | Nominated work | Result | Ref. |
|---|---|---|---|---|
| 1966 | Female Supporting Performance (Note: Lost to Sandy Dennis (Who's Afraid of Virginia Woolf?)) | You're a Big Boy Now | Nominated | |

=== National Board of Review ===
| Year | Category | Nominated work | Result | Ref. |
|---|---|---|---|---|
| 1961 | Best Actress | Summer and Smoke | Won | |
| 1969 | Best Actress | Trilogy | Won | |

=== Venice Film Festival ===
| Year | Category | Nominated work | Result | Ref. |
|---|---|---|---|---|
| 1961 | New Cinema Award for Best Actress | Summer and Smoke | Won | |

== Critics' awards ==
=== Boston Society of Film Critics ===
Boston Society of Film Critics
| Year | Nominated work | Category | Result | Ref. |
|---|---|---|---|---|
| 1985 | The Trip to Bountiful | Best Actress | Won | |

=== Kansas City Film Critics Circle ===
Kansas City Film Critics Circle
| Year | Nominated work | Category | Result | Ref. |
|---|---|---|---|---|
| 1978 | Interiors | Best Actress | Won | |

=== Los Angeles Film Critics Association ===
Los Angeles Film Critics Association
| Year | Nominated work | Category | Result | Ref. |
|---|---|---|---|---|
| 1978 | Interiors | Best Supporting Actress | Nominated | |

=== New York Film Critics Circle ===
New York Film Critics Circle Awards
| Year | Nominated work | Category | Result | Ref. |
|---|---|---|---|---|
| 1962 | Summer and Smoke | Best Actress | Nominated | |
| 1985 | The Trip to Bountiful | Best Actress | Nominated | |

== Works cited ==
- Thise, Mark (2008). Hollywood Winners & Losers A to Z. Wisconsin: Hal Leonard Corporation. ISBN 978-0-879-10351-4.
