= Sweet Bird of Youth (1989 film) =

1989 American television film by Nicolas Roeg

- Genre: Drama
- Based on: Sweet Bird of Youth; 1959 play by Tennessee Williams
- Screenplay by: Gavin Lambert
- Directed by: Nicolas Roeg
- Starring: Elizabeth Taylor; Mark Harmon
- Composer: Ralph Burns
- Country of origin: United States
- Original language: English

Production
- Executive producers: Donald Kushner; Peter Locke; Laurence Mark; Linda Yellen
- Producer: Fred Whitehead
- Cinematography: Francis Kenny
- Editor: Pamela Malouf-Cundy
- Running time: 95 minutes
- Production companies: NBC; The Kushner-Locke Company

Original release
- Network: NBC
- Release: October 1, 1989

Sweet Bird of Youth (also known as Tennessee Williams' Sweet Bird of Youth) is a 1989 American made-for-television drama film directed by Nicolas Roeg, starring Elizabeth Taylor and Mark Harmon. Adapted from the 1959 Tennessee Williams play of the same name by Gavin Lambert, it focuses on the relationship between drifter Chance Wayne and faded movie star Alexandra Del Lago.

== Plot ==
After failing to make it in the film industry, drifter Chance Wayne decides to leave to return to his hometown. Fading film star Alexandra Del Lago is in her third marriage. Her latest husband is a prince, and she is now has the title of a Princess. Horrified by her own closeups in her latest film, she flees with Chance. She uses alcohol and drugs to anesthetize the pain of growing older. Back in his hometown, Chance seeks to resume his love affair with Heavenly Finley, the daughter of the local political boss.

== Cast ==
- Elizabeth Taylor as Alexandra Del Lago, Princess Kosmonopolis
- Mark Harmon as Chance Wayne
- Valerie Perrine as Miss Lucy
- Kevin Geer as Tom Finley Jr.
- Seymour Cassel as Hatcher
- Ronnie Claire Edwards as Aunt Nonnie
- Cheryl Paris as Heavenly Finley
- Rip Torn as Thomas "Boss" Finley
- Charles Lucia as Dr. George Scudder
- Theodore Wilson as Fly
- Megan Blake as Violet
- John Fleck as Mission Man
- Billy Ray Sharkey as Scotty
- Ruta Lee as Sally Powers
- Hal England as Minister
- Nurit Koppel as Edna
- Martha Milliken as Virginia
- Michael Shaner as Driver
- Angela Teek as Singer
- Tery Lockett as Hotel Waiter

== Production ==
Stephen Farber of The New York Times wrote, "In doing his adaptation, Mr. Lambert made some radical simplifications, reducing the Boss Finley story to a bare minimum." Sweet Bird of Youth, "like many other Williams plays, was rewritten several times by the playwright, and Mr. Lambert consulted the different versions that still exist," Farber wrote. The castration in the play, which was removed from the 1962 film adaptation, is included in the 1989 TV movie adaptation. "In some ways," Farber wrote, "the television film is bolder than the 1962 movie version of the play, which starred Geraldine Page and Paul Newman in the roles they had also created on Broadway. Because of censorship at the time, Richard Brooks, the writer-director, could not suggest the castration and was forced instead to end the film with Chance brutally beaten. ... Like the stage version, the TV film will not actually show the castration, but there will be a few clear references to the intention of emasculating Chance."

Filming took place in Upland, California. On May 11 and 12, 1989, vintage convertibles with Florida license plates drove through downtown Upland as cameras rolled. The interior of the Sea Cove bar was used as was the former Atwood's Department Store. A political rally was shot at the gazebo.

This was Elizabeth Taylor's fourth role in a Tennessee Williams adaptation. Rip Torn, who had already played Chance Wayne in the original 1959 Broadway production and Thomas J. Finley, Jr. in the 1962 film adaptation, was cast as a third character, Thomas "Boss" Finley, for the 1989 TV movie adaptation. His scenes were filmed separately from scenes with Taylor and Mark Harmon, so he didn't get to see much of them. This differs from the play, in which the Princess Kosmonopolis and Boss are involved in one scene together. "On stage, when we did it, the Princess comes on during the political rally downstairs when the Boss is doing his thing," said Torn. "She drives by in her convertible."

== Broadcast ==
The film was broadcast on NBC on Sunday, October 1, 1989.

== Reception ==
In his review for The New York Times on September 29, 1989, John J. O'Connor wrote, "Apparently gaining weight again, Miss Taylor wears loose-fitting clothes and is often displayed in extremely dim lighting, which tends to shove Mr. Harmon further into the shadows. This is not the meeting of equals. This is a star turn. And it's a shame. The play and these performers are better than that. Still we get Tennessee Williams, one of the major playwrights of this century. And on commercial television these days, that's something to be grateful for."

Alan Carter of People gave the film a C+, calling it a "sometimes slow-moving retelling of the classic Williams play and 1962 movie." In summary, he wrote, "Idiosyncratic film director Nicolas Roeg (The Man Who Fell to Earth [1976]) gives us endless close-ups of his two stars' dazzling blue eyes—but the production doesn't add up to anything memorable."

Joseph Walker of Deseret News wrote that the film, "with its seaminess and overt sexuality, is not the kind of Sunday night viewing everyone will enjoy. But those who are looking for some sophisticated drama that is well-played artistically and technically will find much to their liking here."

Brenda Murphy noted that, while Richard Brooks's adaptation focused on Chance Wayne, "Nicolas Roeg's centering of the Princess creates a darker film about the inevitable loss of youth and the despairing or resilient responses to it that are possible."
