= National Board of Review Awards 1961 =

Film Award Edition

33rd National Board of Review Awards

December 19, 1961

The 33rd National Board of Review Awards were announced on December 19, 1961.

== Top Ten Films ==
1. Question 7
2. The Hustler
3. West Side Story
4. The Innocents
5. Hoodlum Priest
6. Summer and Smoke
7. The Young Doctors
8. Judgment at Nuremberg
9. One, Two, Three
10. Fanny

== Top Foreign Films ==
1. The Bridge
2. La Dolce Vita
3. Two Women
4. Saturday Night and Sunday Morning
5. A Summer to Remember

== Winners ==
- Best Film: Question 7
- Best Foreign Film: The Bridge
- Best Actor: Albert Finney (Saturday Night and Sunday Morning)
- Best Actress: Geraldine Page (Summer and Smoke)
- Best Supporting Actor: Jackie Gleason (The Hustler)
- Best Supporting Actress: Ruby Dee (A Raisin in the Sun)
- Best Director: Jack Clayton (The Innocents)
