= Stage Struck (1958 film) =

1958 film by Sidney Lumet

- Theatrical release poster
- Directed by: Sidney Lumet
- Screenplay by: Augustus and Ruth Goetz
- Based on: Morning Glory; 1939 play by Zoë Akins
- Produced by: Stuart Millar
- Starring: Henry Fonda; Susan Strasberg; Joan Greenwood; Herbert Marshall; Christopher Plummer
- Cinematography: Franz Planer; Maurice Hartzband
- Edited by: Stuart Gilmore
- Music by: Alex North
- Production company: RKO Radio Pictures
- Distributed by: Buena Vista Film Distribution Co., Inc.
- Release date: March 6, 1958 (US)
- Running time: 95 minutes
- Country: United States
- Language: English

Stage Struck is a 1958 American drama film directed by Sidney Lumet and starring Henry Fonda, Susan Strasberg and Christopher Plummer in his film debut. The screenplay, by Augustus and Ruth Goetz, is based on the stage play Morning Glory by Zoë Akins, which also served as the basis for the 1933 film of the same title starring Katharine Hepburn, Douglas Fairbanks Jr., and Adolphe Menjou.

== Plot ==
In Times Square, Eva Lovelace arrives at Lewis Easton's office with the intent on becoming a Broadway actress. As she waits outside, she recognizes Robert Harley Hedges, an actor, sitting beside her. Eva explains her real name is Gertrude Langerfelder, but changed it to attain more confidence. When Lewis walks out, Hedges introduces Eva to him and Joe Sheridan, a young playwright.

Inside Joe's office, Rita Vernon has been offered a smaller role in a new play, although she prefers to star in Joe's latest play. After Robert signs a new contract, he encourages Eva to audition at the Actors Studio. Soon after, Eva bursts into Lewis's office to thank him in person. As she leaves, Joe invites Eva to audition for a small role as a peasant waitress. However, the audition is unsuccessful.

On the opening night of the play, Joe is pleased to see Eva outside the theatre, where the two watch the play together. As he waits around the newspaper office, Joe reads a glowing theatre review and invites Eva to an afterparty at Lewis's house. Before long, Eva drinks too much champagne and recites lines from Shakespeare's plays, including Romeo and Juliet. Her readings impress Lewis, and he invites her to his office the next day. However, Eva sleeps in a guest room and wakes up late in the night as Lewis prepares for bed. She confesses she has fallen in love with him, and Lewis kisses her.

In Central Park, Lewis meets with Joe where he decides not to become romantically involved with Eva. He hands Joe money hoping to make her leave town, and avoids her phone calls claiming he is in Jamaica. Disgusted by Lewis's disregard for Eva, Joe leaves for Virginia to finish writing his next play. After some time, he returns to New York and reconnects with Robert backstage. There, he learns that Eva is working at a night club where she recites poetry. Joe and Eva enjoy the night together, and as he walks her home, Joe believes Rita is too old for the lead role for the play he is directing, but needs her star quality.

After months of rehearsals, Joe becomes frustrated with Rita's insistence that the part be rewritten, but he refuses to recast her. Meanwhile, Joe has been secretly rehearsing Rita's role with Eva. She confronts Joe about his misdirection believing he will never cast her in the play. Lewis overhears their conversation and tries to search for Eva. The night before the play is to open, Rita realizes she has been miscast and decides to drop out. Eventually, Lewis finds Eva, who is suffering from stage fright, and encourages her to perform like a star.

The play opens, and Eva's performance is applauded by the audience. As Joe leaves the theater, Lewis returns to find Eva alone on the stage. He kisses her, and after regretting his prior behavior towards her, Lewis applauds her as she leaves.

== Cast ==
- Henry Fonda as Lewis Easton
- Susan Strasberg as Eva Lovelace
- Christopher Plummer as Joe Sheridan
- Joan Greenwood as Rita Vernon
- Herbert Marshall as Robert Harley Hedges
- Pat Harrington as Benny
- Frank Campanella as Victor
- John Fiedler as Adrian
- Jack Weston as Frank

== Production ==
Development of Stage Struck began in January 1956 and filming took place in New York starting on January 21, 1957. Around the time filming began, RKO ended domestic distribution and adopted a new film production policy in which it would shop its films to other distributors only after they were finished. Stage Struck was the first film under this policy, and production on it was finished by May 1957. Susan Strasberg was at the time one of the most exciting new female actresses in America, coming off a successful appearance in the film Picnic and the Broadway hit The Diary of Anne Frank.

Walt Disney Productions' subsidiary Buena Vista Film Distribution Co., Inc. was revealed to be the distributor of Stage Struck by late 1957, going against expectations that Universal Pictures was going to distribute it. This arrangement was a reversal of roles—RKO had been a longtime distributor of Disney's films prior to adopting its new film policy.

== Critical reception ==
In his review for The New York Times, A. H. Weiler unfavorably compared the film to Morning Glory, but nevertheless wrote Susan Strasberg "is competent as the determined Eva Lovelace. She is petite and fragile and sometimes expressive but strangely pallid in a role that would seem to call for fire, not mere smoldering."

Filmink argued "we can understand why Strasberg accepted the role; in hindsight though, it was a disastrous decision as she simply wasn’t up to the part" and the film "is full of scenes of men standing around awestruck by a young woman’s acting talent. It needed not just any actor, but an exceptional, generational talent – a young Bette Davis, Katharine Hepburn, Kim Stanley, Florence Pugh etc. Strasberg was a good, likeable performer, but not an acting genius – the film exposed her limitations and did a lot of harm to her reputation in Hollywood."

== See also ==
- List of American films of 1958
