= The Immoralist =

1902 novel by André Gide

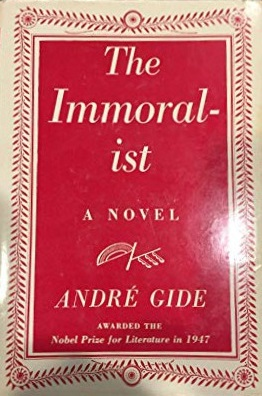
- First English-language edition
- Author: André Gide
- Original title: L'Immoraliste
- Translator: Dorothy Bussy (1930); Richard Howard (1970); David Watson (2000)
- Language: French
- Genre: Novel
- Publisher: Mercure de France (French, 1902); Alfred A. Knopf (English, 1930); Vintage Books (Howard translation, 1996)
- Publication date: 1902
- Publication place: France
- English publication date: 1930
- Media type: Hardback and paperback
- Pages: 144 pages
- OCLC: 5227844

The Immoralist (French: L'Immoraliste) is a novel by André Gide, published in France in 1902.

== Plot ==
The Immoralist is a recollection of events that Michel narrates to his three visiting friends. One of those friends solicits job search assistance for Michel by including in a letter to Monsieur D. R., Président du Conseil, a transcript of Michel's first-person account.

Important points of Michel's story are his recovery from tuberculosis; his attraction to a series of Algerian boys and to his estate caretaker's son; and the evolution of a new perspective on life and society. Through his journey, Michel finds a kindred spirit in the rebellious Ménalque.

== Characters ==
=== Michel ===
Michel was raised by both his mother and father until his mother's death, when he was fifteen. Although she had raised him with strict Huguenot values, he did not observe these values later in his life. He applied the austerity his upbringing had produced in him to his studies. By the age of twenty he was fluent in French, Latin, Greek, Hebrew, Sanskrit, Persian and Arabic. He entered academia around this time, when he wrote the "Essay on Phrygian Religious Customs". The essay was published under his father's name and gained praise. At the age of twenty-five, Michel's father was on his deathbed. To please his father, Michel hastily married Marceline.

Shortly after wedding Marceline, Michel and his wife go on their honeymoon to Tunis. Michel is disappointed by the first ruins he sees in El Djem. Shortly after leaving El Djem, Michel becomes very ill. His illness was diagnosed as tuberculosis and it was unlikely he would survive. Marceline takes him to Biskra, Algeria, where he may recover. Michel slowly recovers under his wife's constant care and with a new found zeal for life after becoming sexually involved with some of the local children. He slowly recovers and the couple leave North Africa through Tunis. While traveling between, Tunis, Malta, and Syracuse, Michel realizes that he has changed. The trip concludes after the couple travel through Italy.

The couple return to La Morinière, an estate owned by Michel. Shortly after the couple arrive, Bocage, the property's caretaker, shows Michel his property and mentions that his son Charles will soon return from an experimental farm in Alençon. Although initially uninterested, Michel takes great interest in Charles' company and gentle nature. As time passes, Bocage tells Michel that Charles will be returning to Alençon. Soon after Michel and his wife, who is now pregnant, move back to Paris.

Michel is immediately bored by and irritated with Parisian high society. He devotes his time to creating lectures, which ultimately prove controversial. Michel and Ménalque become friends at this time, when Ménalque is able to understand Michel's lectures. Michel and Ménalque become good friends and Michel stays with Ménalque the night before his friend leaves Paris. That night Michel learns that his wife had a miscarriage and is terribly ill. He is horribly upset by the event and questions his path in life.

As soon as Marceline is well enough to travel, Michel moves her to La Morinière after she insists she would rather return to Normandy than go to the mountains. Michel quickly becomes disillusioned with farm work and instead tries to understand his workers. He learns of the Heurtevent family and their morally corrupt behavior. Increasingly interested in corrupt and unusual behavior, Michel ultimately decides to catch Alcide, another of Bocage's sons, while Alcide poaches on his land. He ultimately joins Alcide in poaching upon his own property. After learning that Alcide and a few of his workers were cheating him, he becomes enraged. In a confrontation with Charles, who Michel no longer desires, Michel sells his property.

He takes his wife on a trip to the Alps, where she is to recover. Michel grows bored, despite his wife's still fragile nature, and he decides to leave the Alps for Italy. They travel through North Africa, where Marceline's health grows increasingly worse. She dies in and is buried in El Kantara. Three months after her death, Michel writes to his friends and asks for them to visit him. He has grown bored and lonely in his new surroundings and desires to be reintegrated with society.

=== Marceline ===
Marceline is an orphan, who lives with her brothers until she marries Michel. She is a devout Catholic, and her religiosity contrasts with Michel's irreligious nature. When Michel has tuberculosis, Marceline is very attentive and caring towards him. Without her patience and care, it is unlikely that Michel would have survived his illness.

Marceline becomes pregnant and her pregnancy temporarily grounds Michel. Unfortunately, she suffers a miscarriage and her health rapidly deteriorates. After her miscarriage, Marceline's spirit is crushed and she loses much of her mental vigor.

Marceline follows Michel on his travels, even when she eventually contracts tuberculosis. She does not complain about how she is treated by Michel or about Michel's bizarre behavior. Before she dies, she comments on the new doctrine that has taken hold of Michel and how there is no place for her within said doctrine.

=== Ménalque ===
Ménalque is an acquaintance of Michel's. He has a reputation for being disaffected with society, and this reputation attracts Michel. Ménalque claims to live for the present and states that he loathes material possessions. Despite his claims, Ménalque is followed by his own servants, liberally consumes fine wines and foods, and has covered the walls and furniture of his hotel lodgings with fine Nepalese fabrics. Although hypocritical, Ménalque is tired of society and those who blindly follow societal customs. He talks to Michel about his views, greatly influencing the development of Michel's new ideological doctrine.

== Critical analysis ==
In his book Culture and Imperialism, Edward Saïd cites The Immoralist as a literary text that reflects the complex relations between the citizens of colonial France and of French Algeria. This post-colonialist discussion of The Immoralist situates it within the discourses of Africanism and Orientalism. Proponents of Africanism and Orientalism view the peoples and the cultures of Africa and Asia respectively through a Eurocentric lens. By citing Gide's novel as an example of literary Africanism and Orientalism, Saïd suggests that the colonizer is invested with the discursive authority that translates into geopolitical power over the colonized.

== Adaptations ==
The novel was adapted into a play of the same name by Augustus and Ruth Goetz. The play had a Broadway theatre production at the Royale Theatre in New York City, New York, from February to May 1954; it was directed by Daniel Mann and starred James Dean, Louis Jourdan and Geraldine Page.

== Bibliography ==
- André Gide, The Immoralist. Translated by Richard Howard. (New York: Vintage, 1996)
