= Ruth Goetz =

American dramatist

- Born: January 12, 1912; Philadelphia, Pennsylvania, U.S.
- Died: October 12, 2001 (aged 89); Englewood, New Jersey, U.S.
- Occupations: Playwright, Screenwriter

Ruth Goodman Goetz (January 12, 1912 — October 12, 2001) was an American playwright, screenwriter, and translator along with her husband and collaborator Augustus Goetz.

== Biography ==
=== Early life ===
Ruth Goodman on January 12, 1912, in Philadelphia, Pennsylvania, to Lily Cartun Goodman and Philip Goodman, a playwright and a theatrical producer. In her early years, Ruth attended Miss Marshall's Classes for Young Gentlewomen. Shortly after, studied scenic design with Norman Bel Geddes and harbored work as a costume designer. She married Augustus Otto Goetz, a stockbroker at the time, on October 11, 1932.

=== Career ===
In pursuit of writing careers, the Goetzes began collaborating on plays together. Among their first, written in collaboration with Arthur Sheekman, was Franklin Street, a comedy loosely based on her father's autobiography, which closed at the National Theatre in Washington, D.C., in 1942. Their next play, One-Man Show, the story of the relationship between a father and daughter set in the world of art dealers, opened at Broadway's Ethel Barrymore Theatre in 1945 for a brief run.

Later, the Goetzes adapted Washington Square, the novel by author Henry James, to the stage under the same title. Met with little success, the Goetzes revised the ending and brought it back to the stage under the title The Heiress onto Broadway in 1947. After the success of the play, the Goetzes wrote the screenplay for its adaptation to the screen for a film directed by William Wyler. The film received good notices and garnered the partnership a Writers Guild of America Award nomination for Best Written Drama.

In the late 1940s, author André Gide authorized the Goetzes to adapt his novel, L'Immoraliste, for the stage. The theatrical adaptation opened on Broadway in 1954.

The team adapted Theodore Dreiser's novel Sister Carrie for the screen as Carrie (1952) and playwright Zoë Akins' stage play Morning Glory to the screen as Stage Struck (1958). Additionally, they wrote the screenplay for MGM's Rhapsody.

The last collaboration between the Goetzes was the theatrical adaption of Storm Jameson's novel, The Hidden River, which opened on Broadway in 1957. Shortly after its opening, Augustus Goetz died of illness on September 30, 1957.

In 1959, Goetz wrote the stage play Sweet Love Remember'd in honor of her late husband. The play closed out of New Haven following the death of star, Margaret Sullavan at the beginning of 1960. Goetz adapted and translated many French plays into American theatrical production such as L'Amour Fou by Andre Roussin into Madly in Love released in 1964, Comme au Theatre by Francoise Dorin into Play on Love released in 1970.

=== Personal life and death ===
Goetz actively served positions in many organizations based in the art scene of New York such as the Young Playwrights, Inc, the Dramatists Guild, and the Museum of Modern Art. The Goetzes had their only child, Judith, in 1946.

Goetz died on October 12, 2001, at Englewood Hospital in New Jersey.

== Works ==
=== Plays ===
- Franklin Street (1942)
- One Man Show (1945)
- The Heiress (1947)
- The Immoralist (1954)
- The Hidden River (1957)
- Madly in Love (1964)
- Play on Love (1970)

=== Filmography ===
- The Heiress (1949)
- Carrie (1952)
- Rhapsody (1954)
- Stage Struck (1958)
- Die Erbin (1958)
- The Heiress (1961)
- Arvtagerskan (1962)
- Die Erbin (1982)
