= 20th Golden Globe Awards =

Film award ceremony in 1963

- Date: March 3, 1963

The 20th Golden Globe Awards, honoring the best in film and television for 1962, were held on March 5, 1963.

== Winners and nominees ==
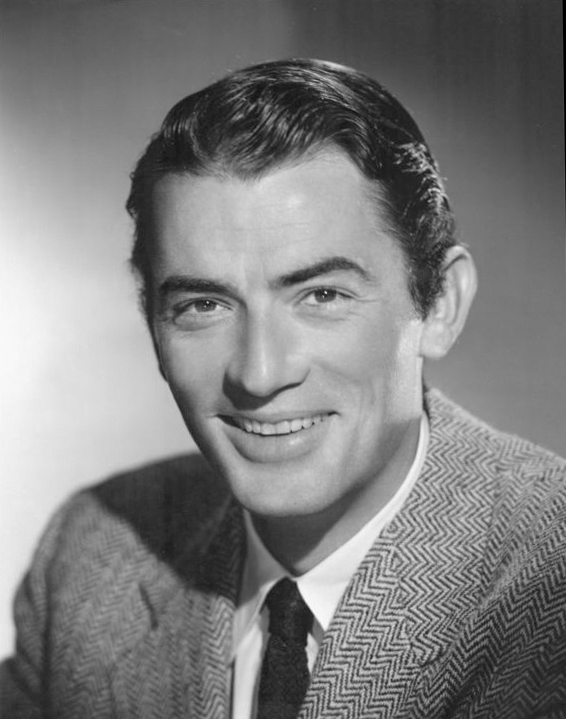
Gregory Peck won for To Kill a Mockingbird

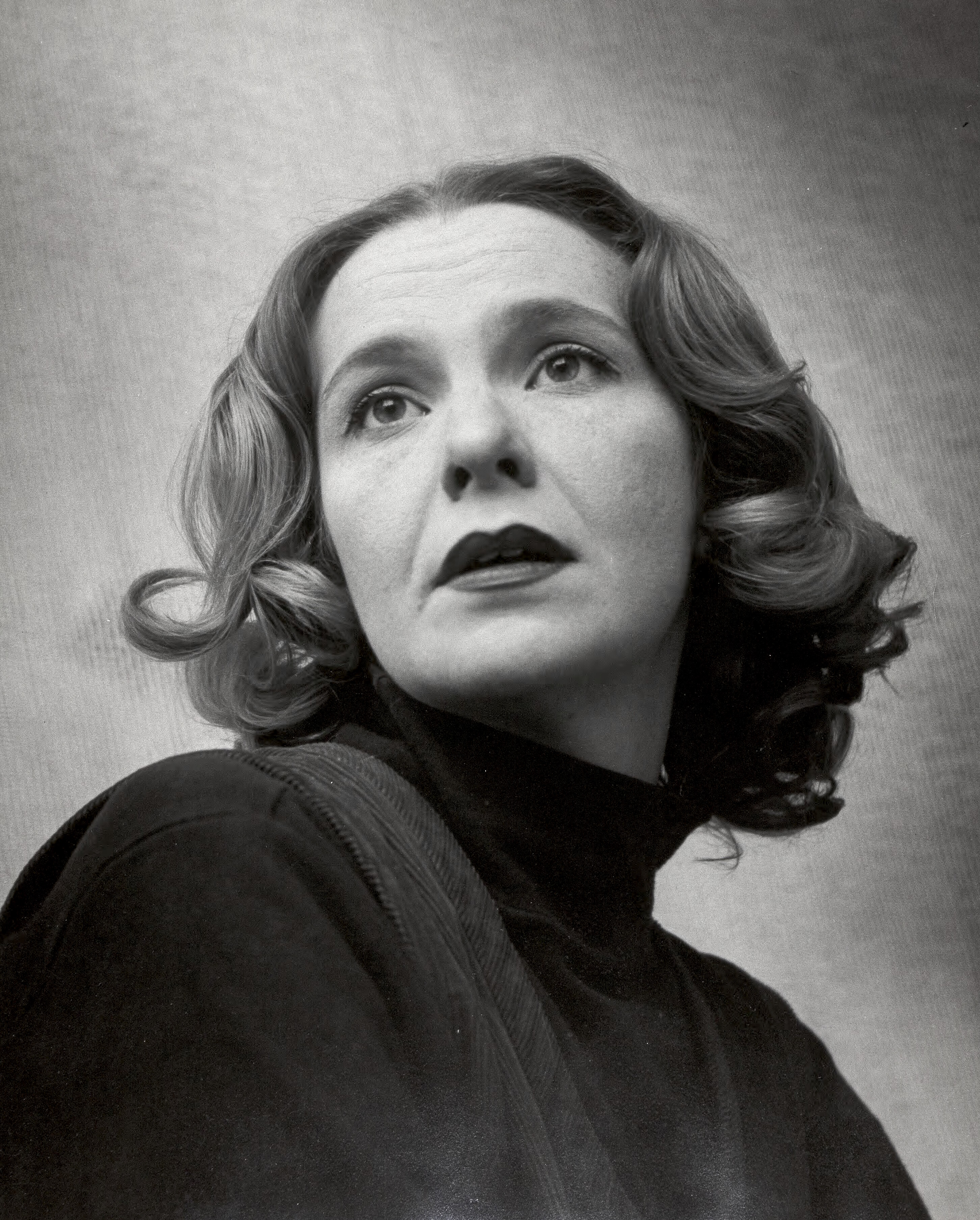
Geraldine Page won for Sweet Bird of Youth

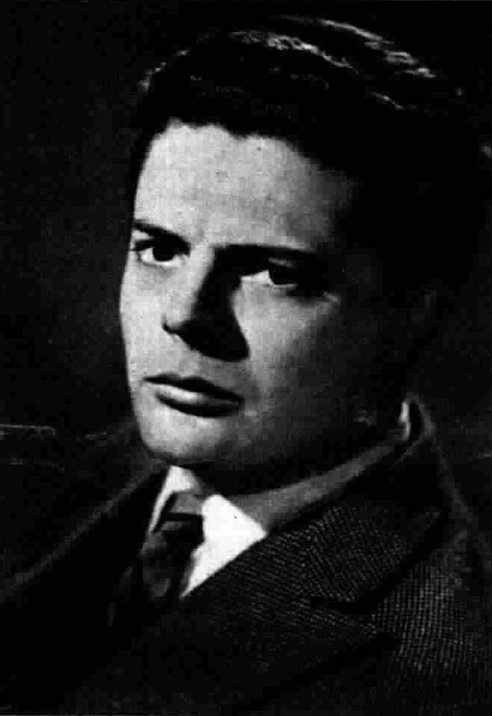
Marcello Mastroianni won for Divorce, Italian Style

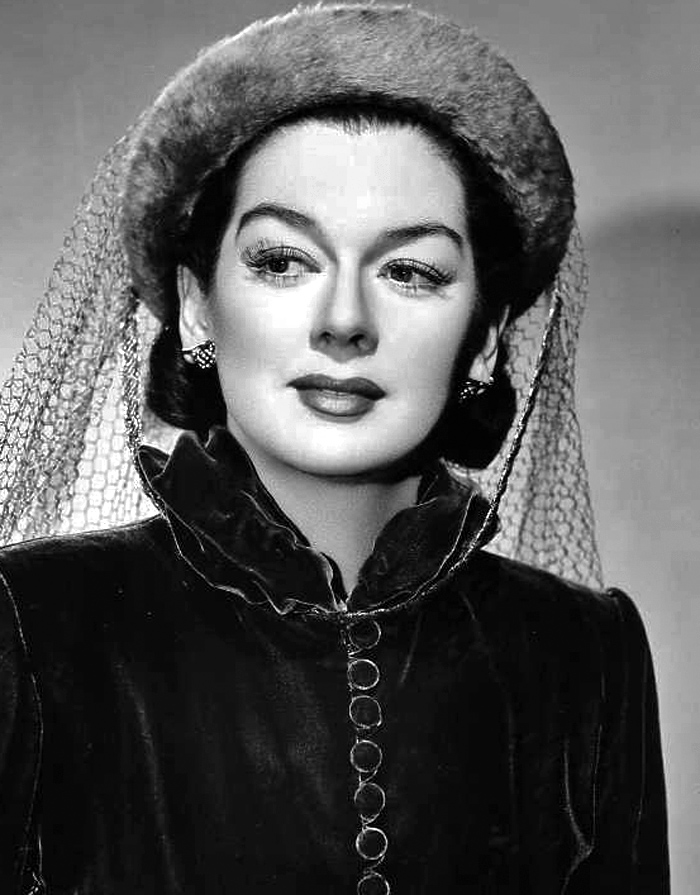
Rosalind Russell won for Gypsy

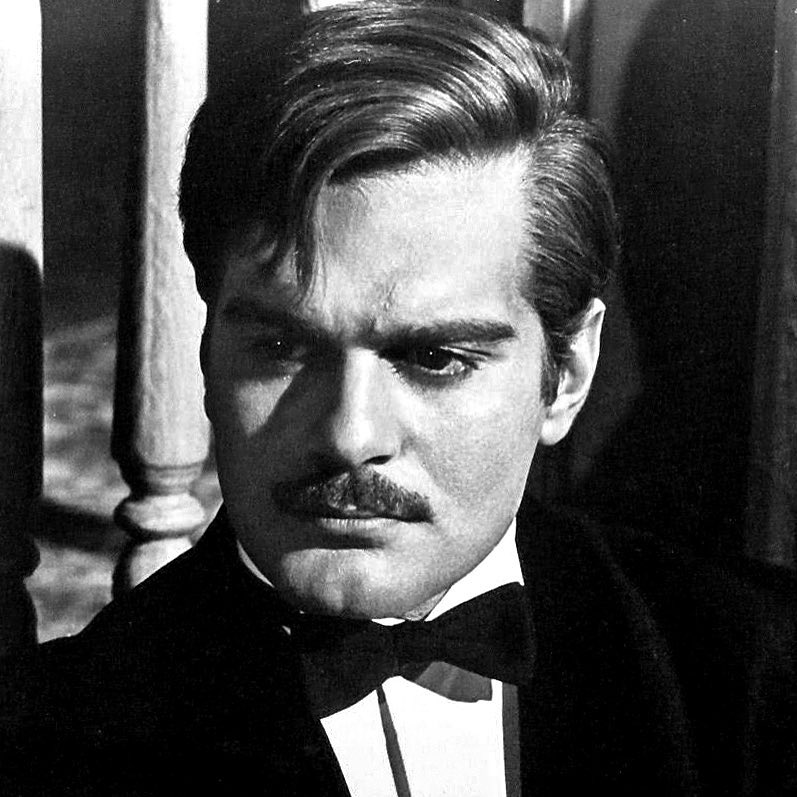
Omar Sharif won for Lawrence of Arabia

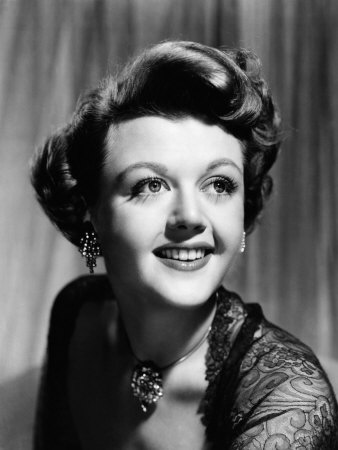
Angela Lansbury won for The Manchurian Candidate

=== Film ===
Best Motion Picture
Drama	Best Director
Lawrence of Arabia; The Chapman Report; Days of Wine and Roses; Freud: The Secret Passion; Hemingway's Adventures of a Young Man; The Inspector; The Longest Day; The Miracle Worker; Mutiny on the Bounty; To Kill a Mockingbird	David Lean - Lawrence of Arabia; George Cukor - The Chapman Report; Morton DaCosta - The Music Man; Blake Edwards - Days of Wine and Roses; John Frankenheimer - The Manchurian Candidate; John Huston - Freud: The Secret Passion; Stanley Kubrick - Lolita; Mervyn LeRoy - Gypsy; Robert Mulligan - To Kill a Mockingbird; Martin Ritt - Hemingway's Adventures of a Young Man; Ismael Rodríguez - My Son, the Hero
Best Film - Comedy	Best Film - Musical
That Touch of Mink; The Best of Enemies; Boys' Night Out; If a Man Answers; Period of Adjustment	The Music Man; Billy Rose's Jumbo; Gypsy; The Wonderful World of the Brothers Grimm
Best Performance in a Motion Picture – Drama
Actor	Actress
Gregory Peck - To Kill a Mockingbird; Bobby Darin - Pressure Point; Laurence Harvey - The Wonderful World of the Brothers Grimm; Jackie Gleason - Gigot; Burt Lancaster - Birdman of Alcatraz; Jack Lemmon - Days of Wine and Roses; James Mason - Lolita; Paul Newman - Sweet Bird of Youth; Peter O'Toole - Lawrence of Arabia; Anthony Quinn - Lawrence of Arabia	Geraldine Page - Sweet Bird of Youth; Anne Bancroft - The Miracle Worker; Bette Davis - What Ever Happened to Baby Jane?; Katharine Hepburn - Long Day's Journey into Night; Glynis Johns - The Chapman Report; Melina Mercouri - Phaedra; Lee Remick - Days of Wine and Roses; Susan Strasberg - Hemingway's Adventures of a Young Man; Shelley Winters - Lolita; Susannah York - Freud: The Secret Passion
Best Performance in a Motion Picture – Comedy or Musical
Actor	Actress
Marcello Mastroianni - Divorce, Italian Style; Stephen Boyd - Billy Rose's Jumbo; Jimmy Durante - Billy Rose's Jumbo; Cary Grant - That Touch of Mink; Charlton Heston - The Pigeon That Took Rome; Karl Malden - Gypsy; Robert Preston - The Music Man; Alberto Sordi - The Best of Enemies; James Stewart - Mr. Hobbs Takes a Vacation	Rosalind Russell - Gypsy; Doris Day - Billy Rose's Jumbo; Jane Fonda - Period of Adjustment; Shirley Jones - The Music Man; Natalie Wood - Gypsy
Best Supporting Performance in a Motion Picture – Drama, Comedy or Musical
Supporting Actor	Supporting Actress
Omar Sharif - Lawrence of Arabia; Ed Begley - Sweet Bird of Youth; Victor Buono - What Ever Happened to Baby Jane?; Harry Guardino - The Pigeon That Took Rome; Ross Martin - Experiment in Terror; Paul Newman - Hemingway's Adventures of a Young Man; Cesar Romero - If a Man Answers; Telly Savalas - Birdman of Alcatraz; Peter Sellers - Lolita; Harold J. Stone - The Chapman Report	Angela Lansbury - The Manchurian Candidate; Patty Duke - The Miracle Worker; Hermione Gingold - The Music Man; Shirley Knight - Sweet Bird of Youth; Susan Kohner - Freud: The Secret Passion; Gabriella Pallotta - The Pigeon That Took Rome; Martha Raye - Billy Rose's Jumbo; Kaye Stevens - The Interns; Jessica Tandy - Hemingway's Adventures of a Young Man; Tarita Teriipaia - Mutiny on the Bounty
Other
Best Film Promoting International Understanding	Best Music, Original Score
To Kill a Mockingbird; The Best of Enemies; The Interns	To Kill a Mockingbird - Elmer Bernstein; Lawrence of Arabia - Maurice Jarre; Mutiny on the Bounty - Bronislau Kaper; Taras Bulba - Franz Waxman; The Music Man - Meredith Willson
Best Cinematography (Black & White)	Best Cinematography (Colour)
The Longest Day - Henri Persin, Walter Wottitz, Jean Bourgoin	Lawrence of Arabia - Freddie Young

=== Television ===
Only winners announced

Best Television Series
Best TV Program	Best TV Show - Comedy
The Dick Powell Show	Mister Ed
Best Performance in a Television Series – Drama
Best TV Star - Male	Best TV Star - Female
Richard Chamberlain - Dr. Kildare	Donna Reed - The Donna Reed Show
Other
Best TV Producer/Director
	Rod Serling - The Twilight Zone

=== Special awards ===
Best International News Coverage Telstar

Most Promising Newcomer - Male

- Keir Dullea
- Peter O'Toole
- Omar Sharif
- Terence Stamp
  - Paul Wallace

Most Promising Newcomer - Female

- Patty Duke
- Sue Lyon
- Rita Tushingham
  - Daliah Lavi
  - Janet Margolin
  - Suzanne Pleshette

Cecil B. DeMille Award Bob Hope
