= Clothes for a Summer Hotel =

Play by Tennessee Williams

First edition (publ. New Directions, 1983)

Clothes for a Summer Hotel is a two-act play written in 1979–80 by Tennessee Williams concerning the relationship between novelist F. Scott Fitzgerald and his wife Zelda. A critical and commercial failure, it was Williams' last play to debut on Broadway during his lifetime. The play takes place over a one-day visit Scott pays the institutionalized Zelda at Highland Mental Hospital in Asheville, North Carolina, with a series of flashbacks to their marriage in the twenties. Williams began work in 1976 on what he envisioned as a "long play" about the Fitzgeralds (he eventually cut it down), and had Geraldine Page in mind to play Zelda from the start.

Williams biographer Donald Spoto has argued that Scott's visit to Zelda was a clear representation of the playwright's frequent visits to his mentally incapacitated sister, Rose, in mental hospitals. Williams himself admitted a close identification with Fitzgerald, saying, "At one point I went through a deep depression and heavy drinking. And I, too, have gone through a period of eclipse in public favor....[The Fitzgeralds] embody concerns of my own, the tortures of the creative artist in a materialist society....They were so close to the edge. I understood the schizophrenia and the thwarted ambition." Williams also acknowledged feeling a kinship with Zelda and insisted, "I think that Zelda has as much talent as her husband did."

After an unsuccessful out-of-town tryout in Washington, Clothes for a Summer Hotel opened at Broadway's Cort Theatre on March 26, 1980, with José Quintero directing and Page and Kenneth Haigh leading the cast. The play was interpreted by critics as a literal biography of the Fitzgeralds "that got its facts wrong" rather than a metaphorical play that alluded to Williams' life. Walter Kerr of The New York Times even faulted the play for "the fact that Mr. Williams's personal voice is nowhere to be heard." In addition to receiving poor critical notices, the play opened at the same time that New Yorkers were dealing with a heavy blizzard and a transit strike, and subsequently closed after fourteen performances. As a result of the play's critical failure, Williams vowed that he would "never open a play in New York again....I can't get good press from the New York Times, and [critics] Harold Clurman, Brendan Gill and Jack Kroll hate me....I put too much of my heart in [my plays] to have them demolished by some querulous old aisle sitters."

In 1981 Williams revised the play for the publication of its acting text by Dramatists Play Service; he then revised that text for the 1983 New Directions edition, which appeared posthumously.
