= The Immoralist (play) =

- Original language: English
- Written by: Augustus Goetz; Ruth Goetz
- Genre: drama
- Setting: Normandy, France. Biskra, North Africa. November 1900 - 1901

Premiere
- Date: 8 February 1954
- Place: Royale Theater, New York

The Immoralist is a play written by Augustus and Ruth Goetz based on the novel of the same name by André Gide. The original production starred James Dean, Louis Jourdan, and Geraldine Page.

== Plot ==
A gay archaeologist marries partly in hope of curbing his homosexual instincts. He is unable to consummate the marriage so the pair travel from Normandy to Algeria for a honeymoon, hoping that will kindle some romance. The husband is seduced by their Arab houseboy, but this allows him to sleep with his wife, who falls pregnant.

== Cast ==
Character	Broadway (1954)	Off-Broadway (1963)
Michel	Louis Jourdan	Frank Langella
Marcelline	Geraldine Page	Marcie Hubert
Bocage	Charles Dingle	Albert Ottenheimer
Bachir	James Dean	Richard Manuel
Dolit	Bill Gunn	Ric Fields
Dr. Robert	John Heldabrand	Tom Klunis
Dr. Garrin	Paul Huber	David Metcalf
Sidma	Adelaide Klein	Marian Carr
Moktir	David J. Stewart	Cal Bellini

== Background ==
The play was produced by Billy Rose and was adapted by Ruth and Augustus Goetz. The original director was Herman Shumlin.

Jourdan and Page had very different approaches to acting which resulted in a difficult rehearsal process. James Dean's behaviour was erratic as well. At the beginning of try outs, Rose replaced Shumlin with Daniel Mann; he also wanted to fire Dean but Page insisted the actor stay.

"Dean was not very happy playing the young Arab," recalled his friend Hal Hackady later. "He didn't like the plot. I also believe he didn't like playing a homosexual on Broadway. He felt uncomfortable."

The Broadway production was initially slated to open on Monday, February 1, 1954, at the Royale Theatre (now the Bernard B. Jacobs Theatre). However, due to last-minute script changes, opening was pushed to Monday, February 8, and previews began on February 1.

Elia Kazan saw the show during previews and offered Dean a role in East of Eden. On opening night, Dean announced he was leaving the show. He remained with the production through February 20, 1954. He was replaced by Phillip Pine, who stepped into the role for the matinee on Monday, February 22 (there was a Monday matinee due to President's Day). The show closed on May 1, 1954, after 8 previews and 96 performances.
