= Summer and Smoke (film) =

1961 film

- Film poster
- Directed by: Peter Glenville
- Screenplay by: James Poe; Meade Roberts
- Based on: Summer and Smoke by Tennessee Williams
- Produced by: Hal B. Wallis
- Starring: Laurence Harvey; Geraldine Page; Pamela Tiffin; Rita Moreno; Una Merkel; John McIntire; Thomas Gomez; Earl Holliman
- Cinematography: Charles Lang
- Edited by: Warren Low
- Music by: Elmer Bernstein
- Distributed by: Paramount Pictures
- Release date: November 16, 1961
- Running time: 118 minutes
- Country: United States
- Language: English

Summer and Smoke is a 1961 American drama film based on the 1948 play by Tennessee Williams. Directed by Peter Glenville, the film stars Laurence Harvey and Geraldine Page, with Rita Moreno, Una Merkel, John McIntire, Thomas Gomez, Pamela Tiffin, Malcolm Atterbury, Lee Patrick, and Earl Holliman.

== Plot ==
Since childhood, Alma Winemiller, an unmarried minister's daughter who teaches singing, has loved her neighbor John Buchanan Jr., the son of a local doctor. Years later, in the 1910s, John, now a doctor, returns home during the Fourth of July and reconnects with Alma. He attempts to seduce her, but Alma, having heard about John's drunken revelry, decides instead for a "spiritual" relationship with him. He soon leaves with Rosa Zacharias, whose father runs the Moon Lake Casino. Shortly after, Dr. Buchanan berates John about his wild behavior and leaves town to treat patients affected by an epidemic.

The next morning, Alma invites John on a date, who agrees to attend. John however breaks his promise and instead gambles with Rosa at the casino. Late at night, John returns home with Rosa, while Alma watches from her window. She arrives at John's doorstep, feeling unwell. John sends Rosa away and treats Alma with sleeping tablets and water. A short time later, John takes Alma to the casino, but she becomes repulsed after seeing a cockfight. They leave and walk through the park where John attempts to seduce her afterwards, but she becomes horrified and rebuffs him.

One night, after Alma holds a concert, she learns from her father Reverend Winemiller that John and Rosa are engaged and he was asked to officiate the marriage, but he refused. After hearing the news, Alma telephones Dr. Buchanan, who is treating patients, to return home. Meanwhile, John hosts a party to celebrate his engagement. The next morning, Buchanan returns home, disgusted, and mercilessly beats Papa Zacharias, who accidentally shoots Buchanan dead.

Devastated by his father's death, John matures and takes over his father's practice. Feeling withdrawn, Alma steps away from teaching music and isolates herself, though she remains in love with John. Months pass, Nellie Ewell, a former student of Alma's, tells Alma that John still speaks highly of her. Overjoyed, Alma goes to John's office to express she is no longer the timid, repressed woman she was last summer. However, John declines her love, stating he now regards their relationship as spiritual. Nellie soon bursts and announces she is engaged to John.

Alma leaves and heads to the park, where she meets Archie Kramer, a traveling salesman. Archie asks Alma what excitement there is in town. Alma suggests the Moon Lake Casino, which is under new management, and they decide to head there.

== Cast ==
- Laurence Harvey as John Buchanan Jr.
- Geraldine Page as Alma Winemiller
- Rita Moreno as Rosa Zacharias
- Una Merkel as Mrs. Winemiller
- John McIntire as Dr. Buchanan
- Thomas Gomez as Papa Zacharias
- Pamela Tiffin as Nellie Ewell
- Malcolm Atterbury as Rev. Winemiller
- Lee Patrick as Mrs. Ewell
- Max Showalter as Roger Doremus (as Casey Adams)
- Earl Holliman as Archie Kramer
- Pepe Hern as Nico

== Production ==
The play had debuted in 1948 but not been a success. Nonetheless, Hal Wallis bought the film rights in 1952 for $100,000 (equivalent to $1.21 million in 2025) following the success of the movie of A Streetcar Named Desire (1951). Later in 1952, the play was successfully revived off Broadway starring Geraldine Page.

Hal Wallis originally offered the film lead to Audrey Hepburn but she turned the role down, not wanting to play a dowdy spinster. Walllis' wife Martha Hyer claimed Wallis offered the lead part to Katharine Hepburn who demanded too much money. The role was given to Geraldine Page, who made her big screen comeback eight years after her Academy Award-nominated performance in Hondo. Wallis wrote "Gerry was a dream. She had just the detached, virginal quality the part called for." Page also appeared in another Williams adaptation filmed around this time, Sweet Bird of Youth. The cost of this and Summer and Smoke was estimated to be $4 million (equivalent to $43.1 million in 2025) in total.

The male lead was Laurence Harvey who was cast on the strength of his work in the film Room at the Top (1958). Wallis wrote "although he lacked the power and virility of Gerry's husband, Rip Torn, who probably would have been better in the role, he was a bigger name at the time."

The film marked the debut of model Pamela Tiffin. Her role had originally been intended for Dolores Hart. Hart recalled that she coveted the role, writing "Wallis thought I was too young for the role—which I took to mean not sexy enough—but agreed to let me do a test for the director, Peter Glenville... I wanted to prove I could do something for Mr. Wallis besides Presley girls. Mr. Wallis liked the test. But Mr. Glenville thought I was too old—which I took to mean not sexy enough. Pamela Tiffin was very good in the part."

Before filming began, there was a week of rehearsals. The film was shot in the afternoons and at night, entirely on soundstages at the Paramount lot. To allow the cast to concentrate on their roles and avoid distractions, the producers closed the set to all visitors.

== Reception ==
The film premiered at the 22nd Venice Film Festival. Variety called it "beautifully acted and distinguished." Page was expected to win Best Actress at the Festival but the award went to Suzanne Flon for Thou Shalt Not Kill which resulted in the crowd booing.

While Geraldine Page received nearly universal acclaim for her performance, Laurence Harvey was thought by some contemporary reviewers as having been miscast as John Buchanan Jr.

The film did not make the Variety list of top-grossing films for 1961 or 1962. Filmink argued this was in part because "director Peter Grenville produced an utterly sexless version... Sex needs to be at the heart of Summer and Smoke and Peter Grenville doesn’t put any in there."

== Accolades ==
Award	Category	Nominee(s)	Result	Ref.
Academy Awards	Best Actress	Geraldine Page	Nominated	
Academy Awards	Best Supporting Actress	Una Merkel	Nominated	
Academy Awards	Best Art Direction – Color	Art Direction: Hal Pereira and Walter H. Tyler; Set Decoration: Samuel M. Comer and Arthur Krams	Nominated	
Academy Awards	Best Music Score of a Dramatic or Comedy Picture	Elmer Bernstein	Nominated	
Directors Guild of America Awards	Outstanding Directorial Achievement in Motion Pictures	Peter Glenville	Nominated	
Golden Globe Awards	Best Actress in a Motion Picture – Drama	Geraldine Page	Won	
Golden Globe Awards	Best Original Score – Motion Picture	Elmer Bernstein	Nominated	
Golden Globe Awards	Most Promising Newcomer – Female	Pamela Tiffin	Nominated	
Laurel Awards	Top Musical Score	Elmer Bernstein	5th Place	
National Board of Review Awards	Top Ten Films		6th Place	
National Board of Review Awards	Best Actress	Geraldine Page	Won	
New York Film Critics Circle Awards	Best Actress	Geraldine Page	2nd Place	
Venice International Film Festival	Golden Lion	Peter Glenville	Nominated	
Venice International Film Festival	Best Actress	Geraldine Page	Won	

The film is recognized by the American Film Institute in these lists:

- 2005: AFI's 100 Years of Film Scores – Nominated
