= The Thanksgiving Visitor =

Short story by Truman Capote

- First edition in solo book form (1968)
- Author: Truman Capote
- Language: English
- Publisher: Random House
- Publication date: 1967
- Publication place: United States
- English publication date: 1968
- Pages: 63 pp
- OCLC: 328485
- Preceded by: "A Christmas Memory"
- Followed by: "One Christmas"

"The Thanksgiving Visitor" is a short story by Truman Capote originally published in the November 1967 issue of McCall's magazine, and later published as a book by Random House, Inc. in 1968. The story takes the form of a childhood tale about a boy and his bully problem. The story has a strong moral lesson related to revenge. It is a sequel to Capote's A Christmas Memory.

== Conception ==
"The Thanksgiving Visitor" was inspired by Truman Capote's childhood growing up in Alabama. One of the main characters, Miss Sook Faulk is based directly on Truman's older cousin, Nanny Rumbley Faulk, whom Truman called "Sook".

== Plot summary ==
The story is narrated by nine-year-old Buddy, whose elderly cousin, Miss Sook, is his best friend. Buddy gets stopped on the way to school every day by a bully named Odd Henderson, who pins him to the ground and rubs burrs into Buddy's head because "he's a sissy", an appellation to which Buddy admits. Miss Sook wants to give Odd a chance and hopes that the boy will leave Buddy alone if he is invited to their big Thanksgiving dinner. Buddy is angered with this decision, as he is afraid of Odd and hates him, and his feelings toward his friend become complex and bitter. During the party, when Buddy is sulking in his bathroom cupboard, he spots Odd stealing a precious cameo that Miss Sook inherited from her father. Buddy realizes this is the perfect opportunity to finally get revenge on his bully. Buddy then claims in front of everyone at the family dinner that Odd has stolen the cameo. Miss Sook goes to check, and she claims that the cameo is in its place. The other relatives demand that Truman apologize for the false accusation, but Odd shocks everyone by admitting that Truman was telling the truth. Odd puts the cameo on the table, thanks Miss Sook for lying to spare him embarrassment, and leaves. Angry and feeling betrayed by his friend, Buddy runs out of the house and sulks in the barn alone for hours. After the guests have left, Miss Sook goes out to find him. She teaches him that he shouldn't have publicly humiliated Odd, and that Buddy's cruel and premeditated plan to deliberately embarrass his bully was worse than Odd stealing the cameo. The story ends with Buddy remarking that Odd never bothered him again.

== Reception and critical analysis ==
An aunt of Truman Capote's was hurt by the tale because she felt Capote had invented a troubled childhood. She said "I just can't believe what Truman has made us out to be and the way he's talked about his childhood. We were a very decent, well-off family, and he's made it to be quite another story."

== Adaptation ==
The story was adapted for television and filmed in Pike Road, AL at the historic Marks house with Capote and many of his friends and family present as observers. The 1967 television production of "The Thanksgiving Visitor" earned Geraldine Page a second Emmy Award.
