= Sweet Bird of Youth =

1959 play by Tennessee Williams

First edition (publ. New Directions)

Sweet Bird of Youth is a 1959 play by Tennessee Williams that tells the story of a gigolo and drifter, Chance Wayne, who returns to his hometown as the companion of a faded movie star, Alexandra del Lago (travelling incognito as Princess Kosmonopolis), whom he hopes to use to help him break into the movies. The main reason for his homecoming is to get back what he had in his youth, primarily, his old girlfriend, whose father had run him out of town years before. The play was written for Tallulah Bankhead, a good friend of Williams.

Sweet Bird of Youth originated around 1956 as two plays: a two-character version of the final play featuring only Chance and the Princess, and a one-act play titled The Pink Bedroom that was later developed into Act Two of the play, featuring Boss Finley and his family.

== Plot ==
In St. Cloud, native son Chance Wayne has fled his hometown, seeking to profit from his beauty and youth in New York or Hollywood. When he fails as an actor and a personality in both cities, he becomes a gigolo. As the traveling escort of his employer, Chance returns to St. Cloud to win back his childhood lover, escorting an aging, depressed, semi-alcoholic film star: Alexandra del Lago, who is running away from the negative criticism of her recently released comeback film.

Del Lago had been burying herself in sex, alcohol, and drugs until Chance recognized her while hustling in a Florida resort. He saw in her a last chance to build a relationship (taking care of her while on their drive back to Hollywood, with him as her escort). As he and del Lago are driving along the Sunset Route back to California, Chance hopes that he will reunite with Heavenly Finley, his childhood sweetheart, and bring her back to Hollywood, where – with del Lago's aid – they will both achieve stardom.

Once back in St. Cloud, Chance discovers Heavenly is only a shadow of the girl he knew. During his last visit to St. Cloud, she was infected with a venereal disease by Chance. The disease was discovered late in its stages, resulting in a hysterectomy and her sterility. Her father and brother are determined to make Chance pay for the injury done to Heavenly. Chance worries that he will receive the same fate as a Black man in town who was recently attacked and castrated.

Using Alexandra's car and funds, Chance tries to prove to the town that he is a success, but his old friends call his bluff and see him for what he has become. Meanwhile, del Lago receives news that the criticism she has been running from is actually praise and that her comeback could not have gone better. Chance believes he will ride with her to the top, but she now has no interest helping him start an acting career. With his youth gone, Chance does not know how to move on with his life. Although she will not recommend him for a job in Hollywood, del Lago urges him to continue as her escort, but he decides to stay and accept his punishment in St. Cloud.

== Production history ==
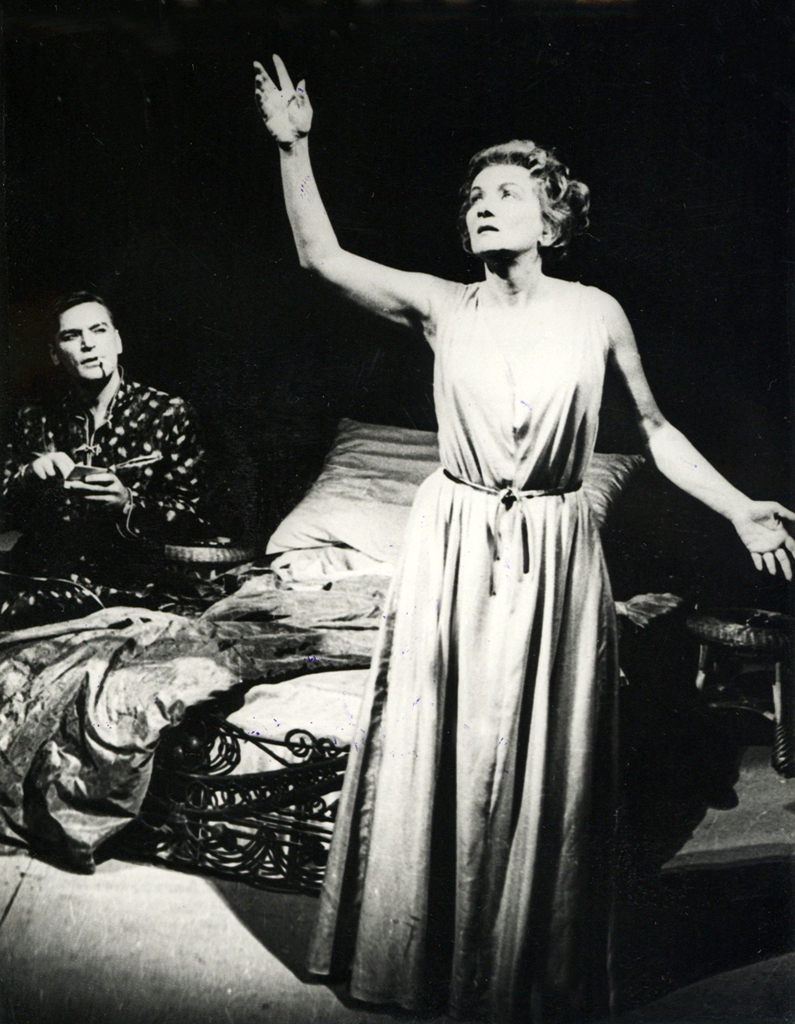
A scene from the play as presented by the Ljubljana Drama Theatre in 1961

=== Pre-Broadway ===
Williams began work on the play in the fall of 1959, calling it at first The Enemy of Time. As Sweet Bird of Youth, the work-in-progress had a tryout production starring Tallulah Bankhead and Robert Drivas in Coral Gables, Florida, directed by George Keathley at his Studio M Playhouse in 1956 which began before Williams' agent Audrey Wood knew he had a new play. Elia Kazan saw it. Kazan and Cheryl Crawford were "party to the secret and petitioned Audrey to let them produce and direct the new play."

=== Broadway ===
The original production by Cheryl Crawford opened on March 10, 1959, at the Martin Beck Theatre in New York City. Directed by Elia Kazan, it starred Paul Newman, Geraldine Page, Sidney Blackmer, Madeleine Sherwood, Diana Hyland, Logan Ramsey, and Rip Torn. Bruce Dern also played a small role. The production was nominated for three Tony Awards, including Best Actress for Page. The play ran for more than a year and 375 performances.

A revival opened on December 29, 1975, at the Harkness Theatre, in a production directed by Edwin Sherin, starring Christopher Walken as Chance Wayne and Irene Worth as Princess Kosmonopolis. Worth won the 1976 Tony Award for Best Actress.

A production was planned to open in 2011 with David Cromer directing and Scott Rudin serving as producer. In 2012, the production was at the Goodman Theatre to much acclaim, with Diane Lane in the lead role.

=== London ===
After 26 years, Sweet Bird of Youth appeared in London's West End. It opened on July 8, 1985, at the Haymarket Theatre in a production directed by Harold Pinter and presented by impresario Douglas Urbanski; it starred Lauren Bacall and Michael Beck with James Grout and David Cunningham. This production later transferred to Los Angeles under the direction of Michael Blakemore.

The play returned to the London stage on 1 June 2013 with a production at The Old Vic directed by Marianne Elliott and starring Kim Cattrall as Del Lago and Seth Numrich as Chance.

=== Chichester ===
The play was revived in 2017 at Chichester Festival Theatre, running from June 2 to 24. Directed by Jonathan Kent, it starred Marcia Gay Harden as Alexandra del Lago/The Princess Kosmonopolis and Brian J. Smith as Chance Wayne. Co-stars included Emma Amos and Richard Cordery.

=== Montevideo ===
Sweet Bird of Youth (Dulce pájaro de juventud) was first staged in Uruguay in 1996 at the Teatro Stella d'Italia in Montevideo, in a production by the La Gaviota theatre company, adapted by Antonio Larreta and directed by Carlos Aguilera. The play was revived at the same venue in 2000, with Humberto de Vargas starring as Chance Wayne.

In April 2025, the play was staged again by the Comedia Nacional at the Solís Theatre, directed by Alejandro Tantanian. The cast featured Enzo Vogrincic as Chance Wayne and Alejandra Wolff as Princess Kosmonopolis. The production played to sold-out performances.

== Film adaptations ==
=== 1962 feature film ===
In 1962, the play was made into a feature film starring Paul Newman, Geraldine Page, Shirley Knight, Madeleine Sherwood, Ed Begley, Rip Torn and Mildred Dunnock. The movie was adapted and directed by Richard Brooks. The film version earned three Academy Award nominations, all for acting: Geraldine Page for Best Actress, Shirley Knight for Best Supporting Actress, and Ed Begley for Best Supporting Actor, which he won.

=== 1989 television film ===
Sweet Bird of Youth was made for television in 1989, directed by Nicolas Roeg and starring Elizabeth Taylor, Mark Harmon, Valerie Perrine, Ronnie Claire Edwards, Cheryl Paris, Kevin Geer and Rip Torn. It was adapted by Gavin Lambert.

== In popular culture ==
- In the Robert Zemeckis film Death Becomes Her (1992), lead character Madeline Ashton (played by Meryl Streep) is depicted as the star of a failing Broadway musical adaptation of Sweet Bird of Youth titled Songbird!.
- The song "Sweet Bird of Truth" by the rock group The The is a reference to the Tennessee Williams play.
- A reference to the Tennessee Williams play (as well as Williams) was written by Bernie Taupin in his lyric for Elton John's song "Lies" from John's 1995 album Made in England.
- The Greek composer Eleni Karaindrou wrote incidental music for the play (2016-17)
