= Pete 'n' Tillie =

1972 film by Martin Ritt

- Theatrical poster
- Directed by: Martin Ritt
- Written by: Peter De Vries (story); Julius J. Epstein
- Produced by: Julius J. Epstein
- Starring: Walter Matthau; Carol Burnett
- Cinematography: John A. Alonzo
- Edited by: Frank Bracht
- Music by: John Williams
- Distributed by: Universal Pictures
- Release date: December 17, 1972
- Running time: 100 minutes
- Country: United States
- Language: English
- Box office: $14,999,969

Pete 'n' Tillie is a 1972 American comedy-drama film directed by Martin Ritt and starring Walter Matthau and Carol Burnett. Its advertising tagline was: "Honeymoon's over. It's time to get married."

At the 45th Academy Awards, screenwriter Julius J. Epstein was nominated for an Oscar for adapting the story from the 1968 novella Witch's Milk by Peter De Vries. Epstein later adapted another De Vries novel for the film Reuben, Reuben.

Geraldine Page was also nominated (her fifth out of eight Oscar nominations) for Best Supporting Actress. The award that year went to Eileen Heckart for Butterflies are Free.

== Plot ==
Tillie Schlaine is introduced to Pete Seltzer at a party. Her friends Gertrude and Burt are the hosts and attempting to fix her up. Pete is a confirmed bachelor with eccentric habits. When he is not doing odd motivational research for a San Francisco firm, he plays ragtime piano and makes puns.

He periodically pops in and out of Tillie's life, going days without calling, but when he spontaneously shows up at her door, they make love, after which he learns that Tillie was a virgin. It appears that Pete might still be seeing other women, but when he gets a promotion at work, Tillie announces that she is pregnant and that it is time to get married.

They wed, buy a house, and Tillie gives birth to a baby boy. Pete's extramarital affairs, however, apparently continue, with Tillie going so far as discouraging one of his young lovers at lunch.

Years go by until one day, 9-year-old son Robbie is stricken with a fatal illness. Pete tries to shield the boy by keeping him in what Tillie calls "a world of nonsense", but the inevitable death destroys Tillie's religious faith and ruptures their marriage.

Tillie abstains from sex while Pete turns to drink, and he takes an apartment. Tillie's depression is alleviated a bit by a friendship with Jimmy, who is gay but willing to marry her if that would make Tillie happy. When she and Jimmy conspire to make Gertrude reveal her true age at long last, the result is a public brawl between the two women.

Tillie ends up in a sanitarium. Her life comes to a standstill until Pete turns up one day. When she observes how their son's death has affected him after his years of hiding it, Tillie and Pete leave the sanitarium together.

== Cast ==
- Walter Matthau as Pete Seltzer
- Carol Burnett as Tillie Schlaine
- Geraldine Page as Gertrude Wilson
- Barry Nelson as Burt Wilson
- Timothy Blake as Lucy Lund
- René Auberjonois as Jimmy Twitchell
- Lee H. Montgomery as Robbie Seltzer
- Kent Smith as Father Keating

== Production ==
Writer Julius Epstein said that the film is a combination of a novella by Peter De Vries and "a flop play of mine called But, Seriously. I took material from the flop play and melded it into the novella because the novella, from the story point of view, was not enough. What I took from my original play made a picture out of it." Epstein said that But, Seriously "had a political angle that was dull as hell—that's what killed the play. There were a lot of laughs in it, which I took and put into Pete 'n' Tillie."

== Reception ==
The film grossed $14,999,969 at the box office, earning an estimated $8.7 million in North American rentals in 1973.

Stanley Kauffmann of The New Republic described Pete 'n' Tillie as 'for the most part an amusing, moving, sentimental, comedy'.

== Awards and nominations ==
It was nominated for two Academy Awards: Julius J. Epstein for Best Adapted Screenplay, and Geraldine Page for Best Supporting Actress.

Walter Matthau received a Golden Globe nomination for Best Actor – Motion Picture Musical or Comedy, and won the 1973 BAFTA Award for Best Actor in a Leading Role for his performance in this movie and for his performance in Charley Varrick.

Carol Burnett received a Golden Globe Award nomination for Best Actress – Motion Picture Musical or Comedy.

== See also ==
- List of American films of 1972
