= Geraldine Page =

American actress (1924–1987)

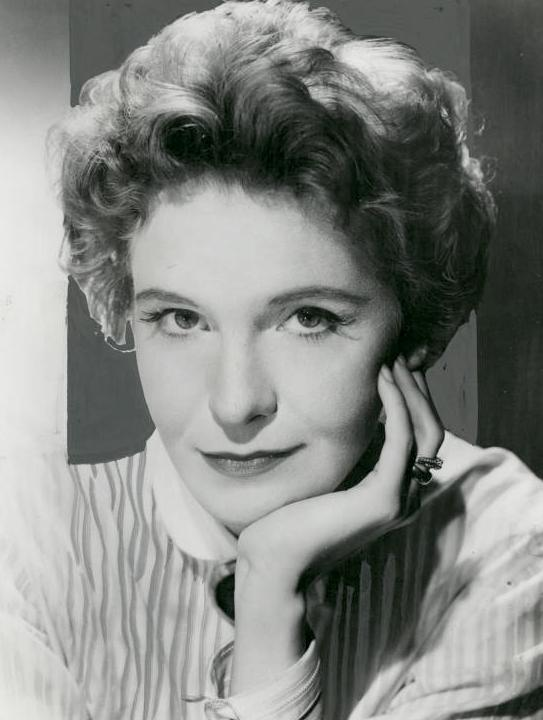
- Page in 1956
- Born: Geraldine Sue Page; November 22, 1924; Kirksville, Missouri, U.S.
- Died: June 13, 1987 (aged 62); New York City, U.S.
- Education: School of the Art Institute of Chicago (BFA)
- Occupation: Actress
- Years active: 1945–1987
- Spouses: Alexander Schneider (m. 1954; div. 1957) Rip Torn (m. 1963)
- Children: 3, including Angelica Page and Tony Torn

Geraldine Sue Page (November 22, 1924 – June 13, 1987) was an American actress. With a career that spanned four decades across film, stage, and television, Page was the recipient of numerous accolades, including an Academy Award, a British Academy Film Award, two Primetime Emmy Awards, and two Golden Globe Awards, as well as nominations for four Tony Awards.

A native of Kirksville, Missouri, Page studied at the Goodman School of Drama at the Art Institute of Chicago and with Uta Hagen and Lee Strasberg in New York City. During the McCarthyism era, she was blacklisted in Hollywood because of her association with Hagen and did not work in film for eight years. Page won the Academy Award for Best Actress for her role in The Trip to Bountiful (1985). She was Oscar-nominated for her work in Hondo (1953), Summer and Smoke (1961), Sweet Bird of Youth (1962), You're a Big Boy Now (1966), Pete 'n' Tillie (1972), Interiors (1978), and The Pope of Greenwich Village (1984). She is also known for her roles in What Ever Happened to Aunt Alice? (1969), The Beguiled (1971), and The Rescuers (1977).

On stage she made her Broadway debut in the 1953 play Mid-summer. She went on to receive Tony Award nominations for her performances as Princess Kosmonopolis in Sweet Bird of Youth (1959), Marion in Absurd Person Singular (1974), Mother Miriam Ruth in Agnes of God (1982), and Madame Arcati in Blithe Spirit (1987). For her prolific work on stage she was inducted into the American Theater Hall of Fame in 1979. For television she received two Primetime Emmy Awards for Outstanding Single Performance by an Actress in a Leading Role in a Drama for her acting in the adaptations of Truman Capote's A Christmas Memory (1967) and The Thanksgiving Visitor (1969).

== Early life and education ==
Page was born in Kirksville, Missouri, the first child of Edna Pearl (née Maize) and Leon Elwin Page, who worked at Andrew Taylor Still College of Osteopathy and Surgery (combined with the American School of Osteopathy, eventually to form A.T. Still University). He was an author whose works included Practical Anatomy (1925), Osteopathic Fundamentals (1926), and The Old Doctor (1932). She had one younger brother, Donald.

At age five Page relocated with her family to Chicago. Raised a Methodist by her mother, Page was an active parishioner of the Englewood Methodist Church in Chicago, where she had her first foray into acting within the church's theatre group, appearing in a play called Excuse My Dust, then playing Jo March in a 1941 production of Louisa May Alcott's Little Women. After graduating from Chicago's Englewood Technical Prep Academy, she attended the Goodman School of Drama at the Art Institute of Chicago (which moved to DePaul University in 1978), with the intention of going into acting. Page had had aspirations of becoming a pianist or visual artist, but at 17 she appeared in her first amateur theatre production, and from that point she never wavered from her desire to be a professional actress.

After graduating from the Art Institute of Chicago in 1945, Page studied acting at the Herbert Berghof School (HB Studio) and the American Theatre Wing in New York City, studying with Uta Hagen for seven years, and then at the Actors Studio with Lee Strasberg. During this time Page would return to Chicago in the summers to perform in repertory theatre in Lake Zurich, Illinois, where she and several fellow actors had established their own independent theater company. She also spent two critically successful years performing with a winter stock company called the Woodstock Players, another group from Goodman, who performed mostly at the Woodstock Opera House where she was singled out by critic Claudia Cassidy of The Chicago Tribune as destined to be a star to bear watching. She was called "the lady with the thousand faces" for her ability to change her looks and actions to an extent that her most devoted fans were unable to recognize her. When she was attempting to establish her career, she worked various odd jobs, including as a hat-check girl, theater usher, lingerie model, and a factory laborer.

== Career ==
=== 1945–1969: Early stage and film ===
A trained method actor, Page spent five years appearing in various repertory theater productions in the Midwest and New York after college. On October 25, 1945, she made her New York stage debut in Seven Mirrors, a play devised by Immaculate Heart High School students from Los Angeles. The play ran for a total of 23 performances at Blackfriars Repertory Theatre on Manhattan's Upper East Side. In February 1952 director José Quintero cast Page in a minor role in Yerma, a theatrical interpretation of a poem by Federico García Lorca, staged at Circle in the Square Theatre in New York City's Greenwich Village. Page was subsequently cast in the role of Alma in the Quintero-directed production of Summer and Smoke, written by Tennessee Williams (also at the Circle Theatre in 1952). Page's work in Summer and Smoke garnered her significant exposure, including a Drama Desk Award and a profile in Time magazine.

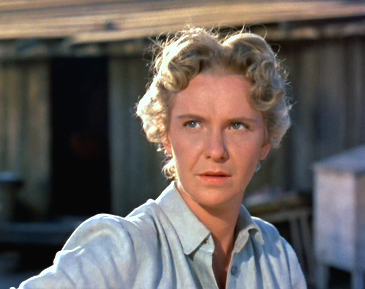
Page in Hondo (1953)

Her official film debut and role in Hondo, opposite John Wayne, earned her a nomination for the Academy Award for Best Supporting Actress. Prior to this she appeared in an uncredited role in Taxi. Speaking to a Kirksville newspaper, she said: "Actually Hondo wasn't my first movie. I had one small but satisfactory scene in a Dan Dailey picture called Taxi, which was filmed in New York." Page was blacklisted in Hollywood shortly after her debut due to her association with Uta Hagen and did not work in film for nearly ten years. Her work continued on Broadway playing a spinster in the 1954–1955 production of The Rainmaker, written by N. Richard Nash, and as the frustrated wife whose husband becomes romantically obsessed with a young Arab, played by James Dean, in the 1954 production of The Immoralist, written by Augustus Goetz and Ruth Goetz and based on the novel of the same name (1902) by André Gide. Page remained friends with Dean until his death the following year and kept a number of personal mementos from the play—including several drawings by him. After Page's death these items were acquired by Heritage Auctions in 2006. In 2015 Angelica Page revealed that her mother had an affair with Dean during the production of The Immoralist. She stated, "According to my mother, their affair went on for three-and-a-half months. In many ways my mother never really got over Jimmy. It was not unusual for me to go to her dressing room through the years, obviously many years after Dean was gone, and find pictures of him taped up on her mirror. My mother never forgot about Jimmy -- never. I believe they were artistic soul mates."

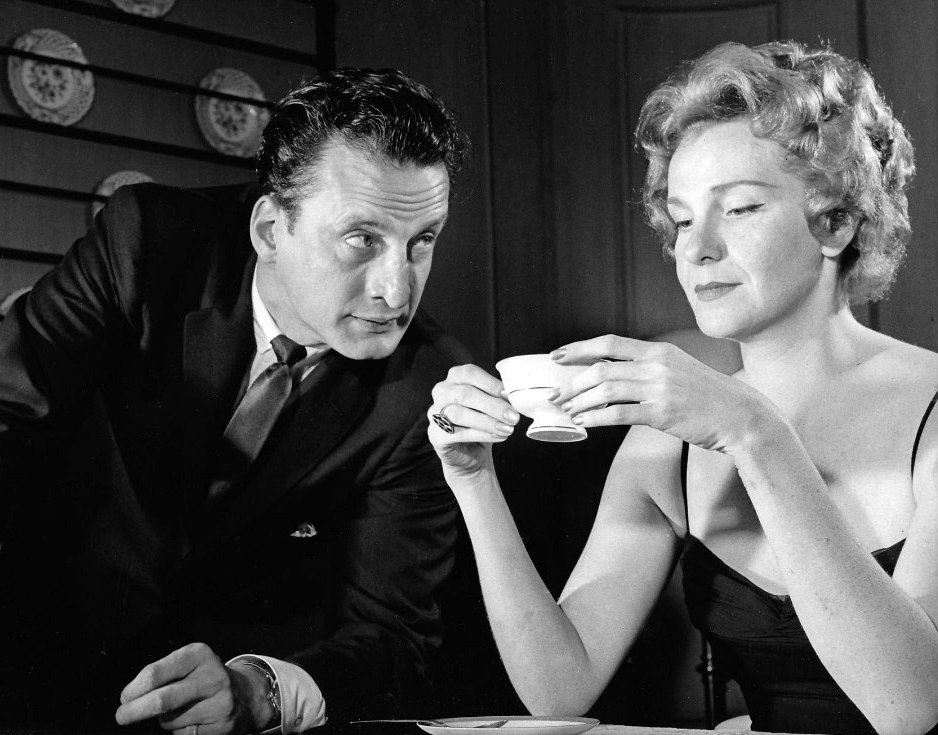
Page opposite George C. Scott in a 1959 NBC Sunday Showcase episode

Prior to Hondo in 1952, she appeared in a revival of Summer and Smoke, placing her, the play, and director Jose Quintero at the beginning of the Off-Broadway scene. Page played the same role of Alma Winemiller in a 1953 radio version (opposite Richard Kiley) and a film version in 1961 opposite Laurence Harvey. She and Una Merkel received nominations for Best Actress and Best Supporting Actress, respectively, for the 34th Academy Awards in 1961. The awards, however, went to Sophia Loren for Two Women and Rita Moreno for West Side Story.

In 1959 Page was nominated for the Best Single Performance by an Actress Emmy Award for her role in the Playhouse 90 episode "The Old Man", written by William Faulkner. She subsequently received critical accolades for her performance in the 1959–1960 Broadway production of Tennessee Williams's Sweet Bird of Youth opposite Paul Newman, in which she originated the role of a larger-than-life, addicted, sexually voracious Hollywood legend trying to extinguish her fears about her career with a young hustler named Chance Wayne (played by Newman). For this performance Page received her first nomination for the Tony Award for Best Actress in a Play and won the Sarah Siddons Award for the run in Chicago. She and Newman later starred in the 1962 film adaptation of the play, for which Page was nominated for the Best Actress Academy Award.

Geraldine Page won consecutive Golden Globe Awards for Best Actress in a Motion Picture - Drama — for Summer and Smoke in 1961 and for Sweet Bird of Youth in 1962 .

In 1963 Page starred in Toys in the Attic, based on the Lillian Hellman play, garnering her a Golden Globe nomination. She received another nomination the following year for starring in Delbert Mann's Dear Heart as a self-sufficient but lonely postmistress visiting New York City for a convention who finds love with a greeting card salesman. In 1964 she starred in a Lee Strasberg-directed Broadway revival of Anton Chekhov's Three Sisters, playing the eldest sister Olga to Kim Stanley's Masha with Barbara Baxley as the interloper Natasha. Both Shirley Knight and Sandy Dennis played the youngest sister Irina during the run of this production.

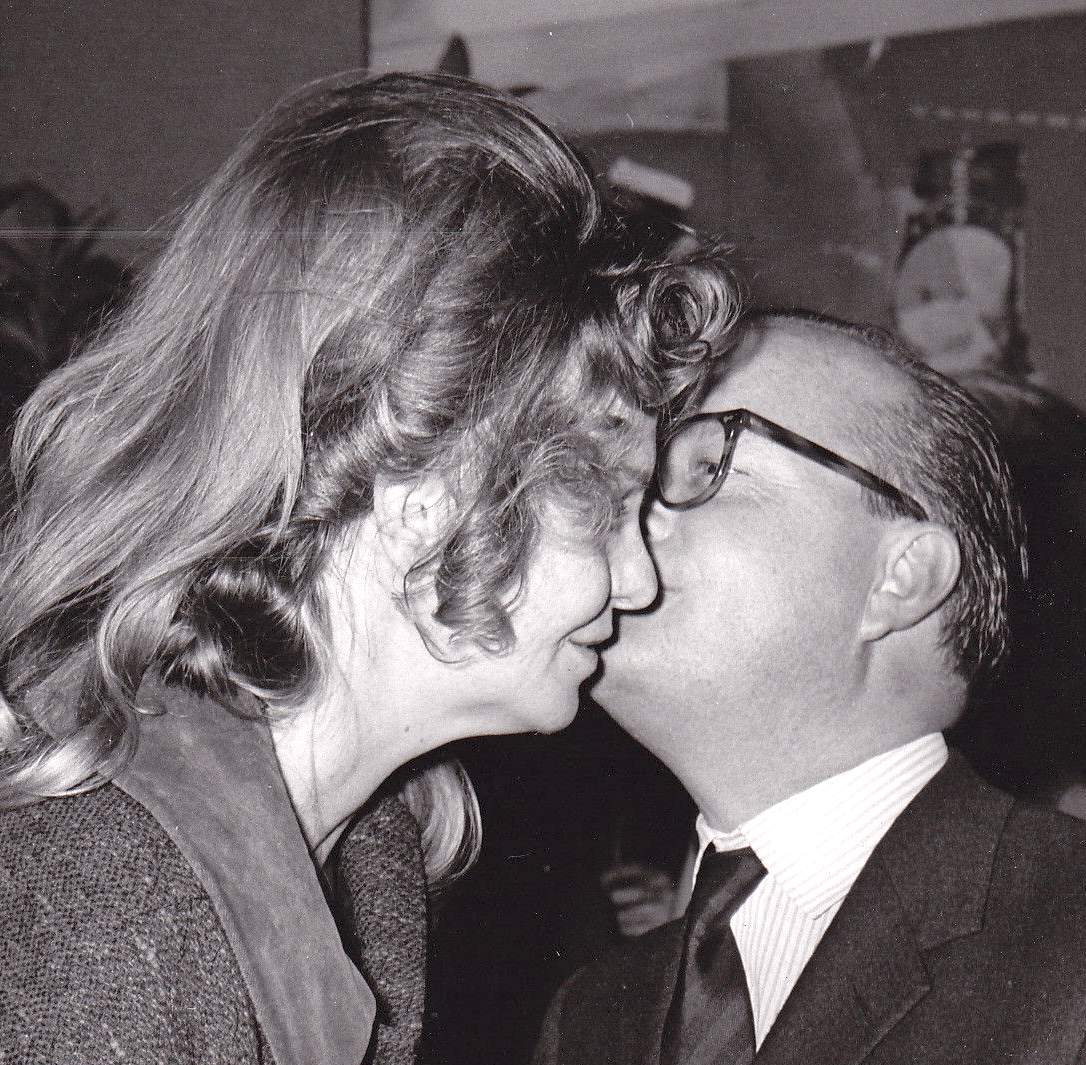
Page with Truman Capote, 1966

Between 1966 and 1969, Page appeared in two holiday-themed television productions based on stories by Truman Capote: "The Christmas Memory" (for ABC Stage 67) and the television film The Thanksgiving Visitor, both of which earned her two consecutive Emmy Awards for Best Actress. In 1967, Page appeared again onstage in Peter Shaffer's Black Comedy/White Lies, a production which also included Michael Crawford and Lynn Redgrave, who were making their Broadway debuts. The same year, she appeared opposite Fred MacMurray in the Walt Disney-produced musical The Happiest Millionaire. Bosley Crowther of The New York Times was critical of the film, noting: "Geraldine Page and Gladys Cooper...square off in one musical scene of socially up-staging each other that is drenched in perfumed vulgarity. But, then, the whole picture is vulgar. It is an over-decorated, over-fluffed, over-sentimentalized endeavor to pretend the lace-curtain millionaires are—or were—every bit as folksy as the old prize-fighters and the Irish brawlers in the saloon."

Page starred opposite Ruth Gordon in the thriller What Ever Happened to Aunt Alice? (1969), the third and final film in the Robert Aldrich-produced trilogy which followed What Ever Happened to Baby Jane? (1962) and Hush...Hush, Sweet Charlotte (1964). The film is based on the novel The Forbidden Garden by Ursula Curtiss and features Page as Claire Marrable, a recently widowed socialite, who, discovers that her husband has left her virtually nothing. The widow hires a number of unsuspecting housekeepers whom she murders one by one and robs them of their life savings in order to keep up her extravagant lifestyle. Writing for The New York Times, Vincent Canby deemed the film "an amusingly baroque horror story told by a master misogynist," and praised Page's "affecting" performance.

=== 1970–1979: Mid-career work ===
Page subsequently appeared in the Don Siegel-directed thriller The Beguiled (1971) opposite Clint Eastwood, playing the headmistress of a Southern girls' boarding school who takes in a wounded Union soldier. Director Siegel called Page "certainly as fine an actor as I've ever worked with. I never have gotten along better with anyone than I did with her." This was followed by a supporting role in the comedy Pete 'n' Tillie (1972), for which she earned an Academy Award nomination for Best Supporting Actress. She also appeared in three episodes of Rod Serling's Night Gallery between 1972 and 1973. In January 1973, she returned to Broadway playing Mary Todd Lincoln opposite Maya Angelou in the two-character play Look Away, written by Jerome Kilty. In 1974, Page played Regina in a production of "The Little Foxes" in which she starred opposite her husband Rip Torn (in the role of Benjamin Hubbard) directed by Philip Minor. It was staged for the Academy Festival Theater at Barat College in Lake Forest, Illinois and received a rave review from William Leonard of the Chicago Tribune: "Geraldine Page is giving one of the greatest performances of her glorious career in Lake Forest and she is surrounded by a cast so superb that the Academy Festival Theater's production of "The Little Foxes" becomes a powerful, searing, unforgettable show... it is a harrowing and ennobling evening in the theater-the kind that comes along all too seldom. We have seen other stars in the role of the malevolently, ruthlessly scheming Regina Giddens—Tallulah Bankhead years ago in her greatest triumph, Eileen Herlie five seasons back at the Ivanhoe. Geraldine Page is a whole new story—I have seen Geraldine Page in innumerable roles, ever since she was playing in East Lynne with the Lake Zurich Players back in the '40s. I've never seen her more thrillingly convincing than in this production." The legendary Kim Stanley once said of Page's Regina that it "was possibly the finest performance" she had ever seen. Page received a nomination for the Tony Award for Best Featured Actress in a Play (her second Tony Award nomination) for the 1975 production of Alan Ayckbourn's Absurd Person Singular with Sandy Dennis and Richard Kiley.

She also had a supporting role as a charismatic Hollywood evangelist (modeled after Aimee Semple McPherson) in The Day of the Locust (1975), an adaptation of the Nathanael West novel of the same name. In 1977, she appeared as a nun in the British comedy Nasty Habits, and provided the voice role of the villainess Madame Medusa in the Walt Disney animated film The Rescuers. During this time, she also appeared on television, guest-starring in the popular series Kojak (1976) and Hawaii Five-O (1977).

Page appeared as the mother of three siblings and wife of a prominent attorney in Woody Allen's Interiors (1978). For her performance, Page was nominated for an Academy Award for Best Actress, and won a BAFTA Award for Best Actress in a Supporting Role. The New York Times's Vincent Canby lauded her performance in the film, writing: "Miss Page, looking a bit like a youthful Louise Nevelson with mink-lashed eyes, is marvelous — erratically kind, impossibly demanding, pathetic in her loneliness and desperate in her anger." The following year, in November 1979, Page was inducted into the American Theater Hall of Fame.

=== 1980–1986: Later work and final roles ===
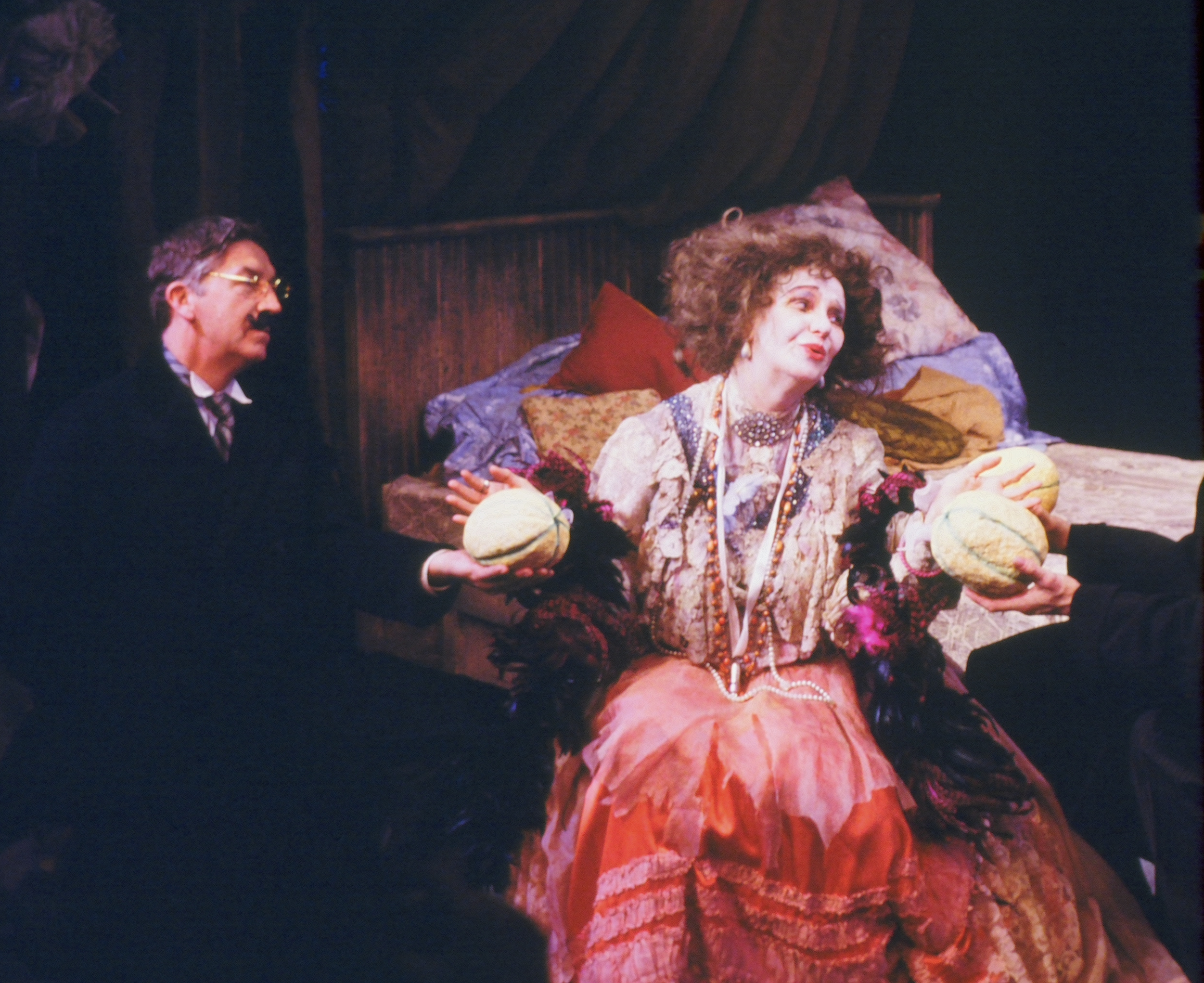
Page with Brian Clark in a 1984 production of The Madwoman of Chaillot

Page starred as Zelda Fitzgerald in the last major Broadway production of a Williams play, Clothes for a Summer Hotel in 1980, followed by a supporting role in Harry's War (1981). Page starred as the secretive nun Mother Miriam Ruth in the Broadway production of Agnes of God, which opened in 1982 and ran for 599 performances with Page performing in nearly all of them; for her role, she received a nomination for the Tony Award for Best Actress in a Play.

Also in 1983, Sabra Jones Strasberg and her husband John Strasberg founded the Mirror Theater Ltd and invited Page to accept the role of Founding Artist in Residence for its repertory program the Mirror Repertory Company. Page remained continually active in theater, appearing in numerous repertory, Broadway, and Off-Broadway productions throughout the 1980s; this included roles in a revivals of Inheritors by Susan Glaspell and Paradise Lost by Clifford Odets in 1983, Rain by John Colton (based on the short story "Miss Thompson" by W. Somerset Maugham) the following year. Further revivals followed in 1985: Vivat! Vivat Regina! by Robert Bolt (in which she played Elizabeth I), Clarence by Booth Tarkington, and The Madwoman of Chaillot (by Jean Giraudoux) in which she played the Madwoman to great acclaim).

Page earned her seventh Academy Award nomination for her performance in the dark comedy The Pope of Greenwich Village (1984). This marked a record at the time for most Academy Award nominations without a win, for which Page was tied with Peter O'Toole and Richard Burton (who themselves had also garnered seven nominations without winning). On television, Page had a supporting role in the miniseries The Dollmaker (1984), opposite Jane Fonda and Amanda Plummer. She appeared in the British horror film The Bride opposite Sting and Jennifer Beals; the drama White Nights, directed by Taylor Hackford; and opposite Rebecca De Mornay in the drama The Trip to Bountiful (all 1985), in which she played an aging Southern Texas woman seeking to return to her hometown. The role earned Page wide critical acclaim, with the Los Angeles Times referring to it as "the performance of a lifetime."

In 1986, she appeared on Broadway in The Circle by W. Somerset Maugham; during this production, Page won the Academy Award for Best Actress for her performance in The Trip to Bountiful. During her acceptance speech, she thanked The Mirror Theater Ltd. Page wore her costume from The Circle, which had been designed and made by Gail Cooper-Hecht, the Mirror Theater's costume designer. She received the award from F. Murray Abraham, who, after winning his Oscar for Amadeus, also joined the Mirror Repertory Company to play the rag-picker in The Madwoman of Chaillot. Prior to winning the Academy Award, Page said to People magazine: "If I lose the Oscar this year, I'll have the record for the most nominations without ever winning... I'd love to be champion, [but the loser] doesn't have to get up there and make a fool of herself."

After winning the Academy Award, Page returned to finish her run performing in The Circle for Mirror Theater and appeared opposite Carroll Baker, Oprah Winfrey, and Elizabeth McGovern in Native Son (1986). Page followed up Native Son with a lead role opposite Mary Stuart Masterson in My Little Girl (1987). In the fall of 1986, Page asked permission to return to Broadway in a revival of Noël Coward's Blithe Spirit in the role of Madame Arcati. She was cast in the role, though the production would be Page's last. She was again nominated for the Tony Award for Best Actress in a Play, though she did not win. A week after the Tony Awards ceremony, Page failed to appear for two performances of the play and was found dead in her Manhattan home. The show lasted several weeks more, with Page's understudy Patricia Conolly taking over her role.

== Reception and acting style ==
If [other actors] have trained the way you've been trained there is at least the hope of communication. But wonderful actors are wonderful to act with–it doesn't matter how they've been trained.

— Page on acting, 1964

Page was trained as a method actor, and at times worked with psychoanalysts when developing her interpretations of roles. She once told the Los Angeles Times: "If I read a part and think I can connect to it, that I can touch people with it, I will do it, no matter what its size. And if I think I can't do something with a part, I won't take it." In a 1964 interview after completing the Broadway run of The Three Sisters, Page discussed her method acting at length. When asked if she used emotional recall as a technique, she responded: "I would never shut it out. But I don't try to get one. My whole effort is to relax and keep the doors open so that there's room if one should pop up."

During her life, Page was regarded as a respected character actress. Speaking of her stage career in 1986, she said: "I used to think that by opening [night] all the work was done. Now I'm finding how much you can learn from the audience." She described acting as a "bottomless cup", adding, "If I studied for the next ninety years I'd just be scratching the surface."

== Personal life ==
Page was married to violinist Alexander Schneider from 1954 to 1957. On September 8, 1963, she married actor Rip Torn, who was six years her junior, in Pinal, Arizona. They had played opposite each other in Sweet Bird of Youth on Broadway and in the 1962 film. They had three children: a daughter, actress Angelica Page, and twin sons, actor Anthony "Tony" and Jonathan "Jon" Torn.

Beginning in the early 1980s, Page and Torn lived separately after he began an affair with actress Amy Wright; Torn had first met Wright in 1976 and began the affair shortly after. Page was aware of Torn and Wright's relationship, and had appeared onstage opposite Wright in the 1977 Off-Broadway production of The Stronger, under Torn's direction. In 1983, Torn fathered a child with Wright. After the birth of the child, Page was questioned about her marriage by columnist Cindy Adams, to which she responded: "Of course Rip and I are still married. We've been married for years. We're staying married. What's the big fuss?" In spite of their separation, Page and Torn remained married until her death; her daughter described their relationship as still "close" up until Page died in 1987.

Page considered herself a gourmand, once joking: "'Greedy Gut' is my middle name...Rip is wonderful. He does the cooking, and I do the eating. I love everything but eggplant."

== Death and legacy ==
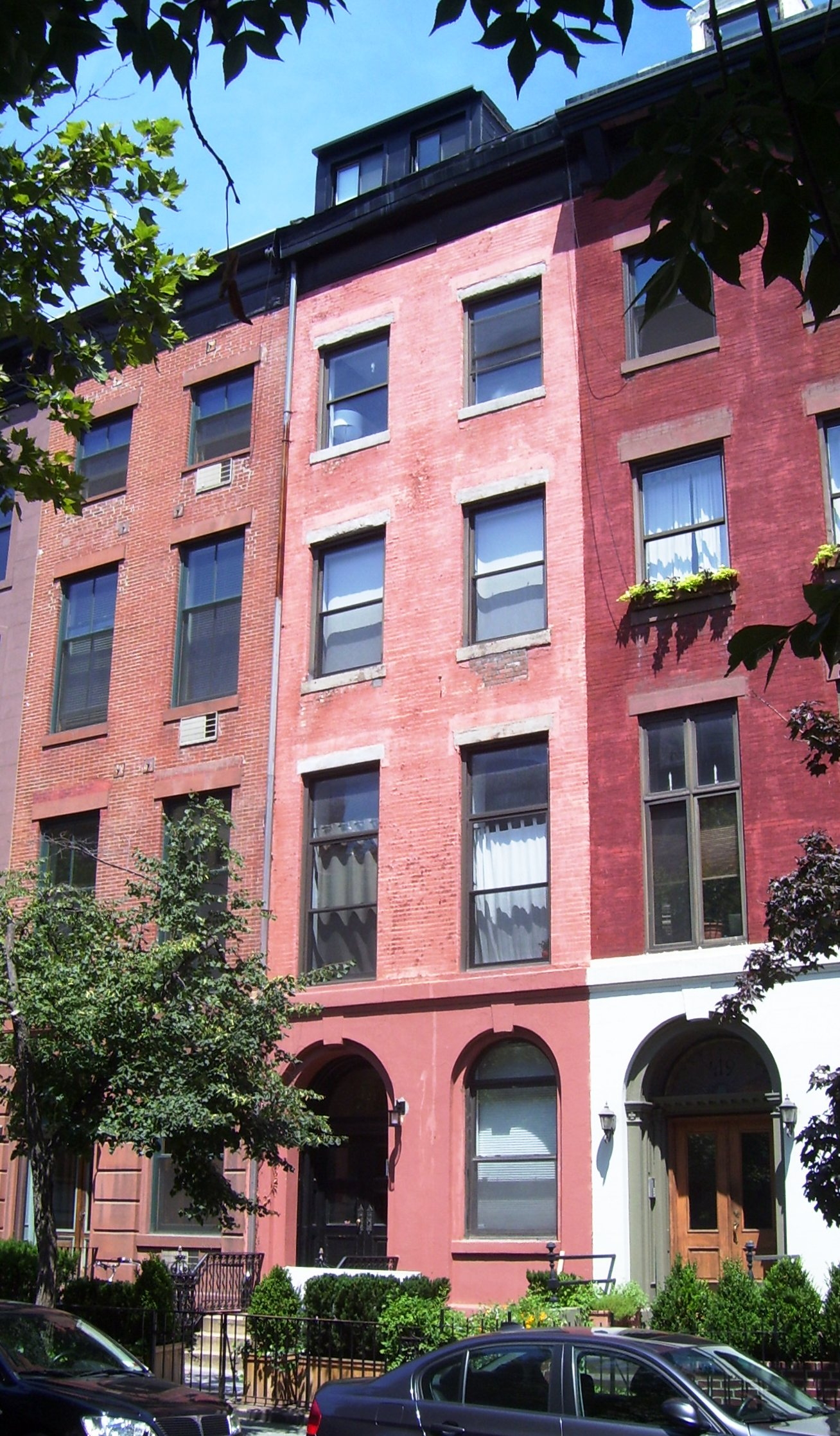
Page's townhouse in Chelsea, Manhattan, where she died in 1987

On June 13, 1987, Page failed to arrive at the Neil Simon Theatre for both the afternoon and evening performances of Noël Coward's Blithe Spirit, which had begun its run in March. At the end of the show's evening performance, the play's producer announced that Page had been found dead in her lower Manhattan townhouse. It was determined that she died of a heart attack.

On June 18, "an overflow crowd of colleagues, friends and fans", including Sissy Spacek, James Earl Jones, Amanda Plummer, Jerry Stiller, Anne Meara and Geraldine's husband Rip Torn attended a memorial service held at the Neil Simon Theatre.

Highlighting Page's achievements, actress Anne Jackson said, "[Page] used a stage like no one else I'd ever seen. It was like playing tennis with someone who had 26 arms." Rip Torn called her "Mi corazón, mi alma, mi esposa" ("My heart, my soul, my wife") and said that they had "never stopped being lovers, and ... never will".

== Acting credits and accolades ==
Page earned a total of eight nominations before winning her first Academy Award for Best Actress in 1986 for The Trip to Bountiful. She was also a winner of two Golden Globe Awards, two Primetime Emmy Awards, and one BAFTA award.

For her stage work on Broadway, Page earned a total of four Tony Award nominations, and was referred to by the New York Daily News as "one of the finest stage actors of her generation". She was inducted into the American Theatre Hall of Fame in 1979.

== In popular culture ==
Sarah Paulson portrayed Page in the 2017 anthology television series Feud, which chronicles the rivalry between actresses Bette Davis and Joan Crawford on the set of What Ever Happened to Baby Jane? (1962).

She was also portrayed by her daughter, Angelica Page, in the stage production Turning Page. A monologue play chronicling Page's life, it was also written by her daughter: "I grew up in the center of her sparkling career," Angelica recalled. "As her only daughter I feel compelled to share her lessons and gifts with others who did and did not have the opportunity to know her magic intimately. She was a true rebel and trail blazer. A masterful woman who was ahead of her time and should not be forgotten anytime soon." The play premiered in Los Angeles in 2016, followed by performances in New York City in 2017.

== Works cited ==
- Banham, Martin (1995). The Cambridge Guide to Theatre. Cambridge: Cambridge University Press. ISBN 978-0-521-43437-9. OCLC 493930248.
- Botto, Louis; Mitchell, Brian Stokes (2002). At This Theatre: 100 Years of Broadway Shows, Stories and Stars. New York; Milwaukee, WI: Applause Theatre & Cinema Books/Playbill. ISBN 978-1-55783-566-6.
- Carroll, Joseph (2013). "Geraldine Page". In Senelick, Laurence (ed.). Theatre Arts on Acting. Routledge. ISBN 978-1-134-72375-1. OCLC 927998762.
- Christensen, Lawrence O.; Foley, William E.; Kremer, Gary (1999). Dictionary of Missouri Biography. Columbia, Missouri: University of Missouri Press. ISBN 978-0-826-26016-1. OCLC 41272935.
- Cosgrave, Bronwyn (2008). Made For Each Other: Fashion and the Academy Awards. New York: Bloomsbury USA. ISBN 978-1-596-91752-1. OCLC 947057508.
- Crystal, David (2007). The Penguin Factfinder (Third ed.). New York: Penguin. ISBN 978-0-141-02622-0. OCLC 76935604.
- Heintzelman, Greta; Howard, Alycia Smith (2014). Critical Companion to Tennessee Williams. New York: Infobase Publishing. ISBN 978-1-438-10856-8. OCLC 882540789.
- Hischak, Thomas S. (2012). American Literature on Stage and Screen: 525 Works and Their Adaptations. Jefferson, North Carolina: McFarland. ISBN 978-0-786-49279-4. OCLC 806205216.
- Krauss, Kenneth (2014). Male Beauty: Postwar Masculinity in Theater, Film, and Physique Magazines. Albany, New York: SUNY Press. ISBN 978-1-438-45001-8. OCLC 908745819.
- Muir, John Kenneth (2001). Terror Television: American Series, 1970-1999. Jefferson, North Carolina: McFarland. ISBN 978-0-786-40890-0. OCLC 461549242.
- Nathan, George J. (1974). Angoff, Charles (ed.). The Theatre Book of the Year, 1945-1946. Farleigh Dickinson University Press. ISBN 978-0-838-61174-6. OCLC 962192282.
- Porter, Darwin (2006). Brando Unzipped. Staten Island: Blood Moon Productions, Ltd. ISBN 978-0-974-81182-6. OCLC 224252793.
- Pugh, Tison (2014). Truman Capote: A Literary Life at the Movies. Athens, Georgia: University of Georgia Press. ISBN 978-0-820-34709-7. OCLC 995326201.
- Quinlan, David (1987). Wicked Women of the Screen. London: Batsford. ISBN 978-0-713-45305-8. OCLC 906521157.
- Schechner, Richard (1964). "The Bottomess Cup: An interview with Geraldine Page". TDR. 9 (2). New Orleans: 114–30. JSTOR 1125105.
- Silver, Alain (1995). What Ever Happened to Robert Aldrich?: His Life and His Films. New York: Limelight Ed. ISBN 978-1-617-80165-5. OCLC 243831753.
- Sterritt, David (2014). The Cinema of Clint Eastwood: Chronicles of America. New York: Columbia University Press. ISBN 978-0-231-17201-1. OCLC 967256152.
- Thise, Mark (2008). Hollywood Winners & Losers A to Z. New York: Hal Leonard Corporation. ISBN 978-0-879-10351-4. OCLC 154751929.
- Walter, Georgia (1992). The First School of Osteopathic Medicine. Kirksville, Missouri: Thomas Jefferson University Press. ISBN 978-0-943-54908-8. OCLC 34195261.
