= Sweet Bird of Youth (1962 film) =

1962 film by Richard Brooks

- original movie poster
- Directed by: Richard Brooks
- Written by: Richard Brooks
- Based on: Sweet Bird of Youth; 1959 play by Tennessee Williams
- Produced by: Pandro S. Berman
- Starring: Paul Newman; Geraldine Page; Shirley Knight; Ed Begley; Rip Torn; Mildred Dunnock; Madeleine Sherwood
- Cinematography: Milton Krasner
- Edited by: Henry Berman
- Music by: Harold Gelman
- Production company: Roxbury
- Distributed by: Metro-Goldwyn-Mayer
- Release date: March 21, 1962
- Running time: 120 minutes
- Country: United States
- Language: English
- Budget: $2.8 million
- Box office: $2,700,000 (North American rentals)

Sweet Bird of Youth is a 1962 American drama film starring Paul Newman and Geraldine Page, with Shirley Knight, Madeleine Sherwood, Ed Begley, Rip Torn and Mildred Dunnock in supporting roles. Based on the 1959 play of the same name by Tennessee Williams, the film was adapted and directed by Richard Brooks.

The film won the Academy Award for Best Supporting Actor (Ed Begley), and was nominated for Best Actress (Geraldine Page) and Best Supporting Actress (Shirley Knight). The film version was sanitized, although Chance Wayne was still a gigolo for hire. The ending was heavily altered from the explicit sexual mutilation scene depicted in the conclusion of the original stage version.

== Plot ==
Handsome, young Chance Wayne returns to his hometown of St. Cloud, Mississippi, a chauffeur and gigolo to a considerably older film star, Alexandra Del Lago. Needy and feeling discouraged after completing filming of her latest film, she is considering retiring from the acting world.

Chance, once a waiter at the local country club, had gone to New York City to seek fame and fortune at the behest of St. Cloud's most powerful and influential citizen, Tom "Boss" Finley, who had duped him into leaving town as a means of keeping him away from his beautiful daughter, Heavenly. A political kingpin, Finley enjoys putting Heavenly on display as a model of purity and chastity. His ruthless son, Tom Jr., aids his father's ambitions in any way he can. He, too, is unhappy to have Chance back in town.

Desperate to have Alexandra further his fantasy of becoming a star, Chance has become her lover. He goes so far as to blackmail her with a tape recording, on which she speaks openly of a dependence on drugs. Alexandra defies him, becoming irate at the realization that Chance's romantic interests in Heavenly are more important to him than her own needs.

Just when Alexandra is at her most vulnerable, she learns from major syndicated gossip columnist Walter Winchell that her performance in her new movie is being raved as the best of her career, and the picture appears to be a certain success. Meanwhile, Finley's discarded mistress, Miss Lucy, exposes Finley's underhanded tactics to the government authorities, including Heavenly's forced abortion from Dr. George Scudder who later became her fiancé.

Chance, who has been repeatedly warned to stay away from Heavenly and leave town immediately, refuses to do either. Repudiated by Alexandra, and resigned to his fate, he stages a scene outside the Finley mansion, and is cornered there by Tom Jr. and his gang of thugs. Determined to ruin Chance's "meal ticket" once and for all, Tom Jr. smashes his face in with the crook end of his father's cane. When Heavenly returns home and discovers Chance lying in a heap in their driveway, she defies her father and runs off together with Chance.

== Cast ==
- Paul Newman as Chance Wayne
- Geraldine Page as Alexandra Del Lago
- Shirley Knight as Heavenly Finley
- Ed Begley as Tom "Boss" Finley
- Rip Torn as Thomas "Tom" J. Finley Jr.
- Mildred Dunnock as Aunt Nonnie
- Madeleine Sherwood as Miss Lucy
- Philip Abbott as Dr. George Scudder
- Corey Allen as Scotty
- Barry Cahill as Bud
- Dub Taylor as Dan Hatcher
- James Douglas as Leroy
- Barry Atwater as Ben Jackson
- Charles Arnt as Mayor Henricks
- Mike Steen as Deputy
- Kelly Thordsen as Sheriff Clark
- William Forrest as Bennie Taubman
- Davis Roberts as Fly
- Roy Glenn as Charles

== Production ==
The film was produced by Roxbury Productions, a company established by Pandro Berman to make two films for MGM. Berman bought the film rights to the stage play a year and a half before it debuted on Broadway, for $400,000. Richard Brooks, who wrote and directed, said the cost of the play rights was $600,000 but there may have been an extra fee payable after the play had been on Broadway.

The film reunited Berman with Paul Newman, MGM and Richard Brooks, who had previously made a very successful version of Cat on a Hot Tin Roof by Tennessee Williams, also for MGM. Brooks later said he only did the film because Paul Newman asked him to do it. "Sweet Bird I didn’t want to do," he said. "While I thought it was a very good play, I felt that time had passed, that there were too many imitations of [Tennessee Williams'] work. So many of his pieces had been done and were even being brought back and were playing at the same time."

According to Hank Moonjean, who was assistant director, a condition of Brooks' contract was that Tennessee Williams would have nothing to do with the screenplay. However, Williams did insist on a small role for actor Mike Steen, who Moonjean says was the original inspiration for the character of Chance Wayne. He played the police officer watching Heavenly Finley (Shirley Knight).

The adaptation of the original play by Tennessee Williams went through several drafts, with Brooks unsure how to film the play's controversial ending in which Chance is castrated by Tom "Boss" Finley's hoods. The castration was cut from the film and replaced by Finley (Ed Begley)'s son Tom Jr. (Rip Torn) clubbing Chance in the face with a cane, followed by Chance and Heavenly escaping together.

Williams called Richard Brooks "a wonderful director except that at the end he cheats on the material, sweetens it up and makes it all hunky-dory.... [he] wrote a fabulous screenplay of Sweet Bird of Youth but he did the same fucking thing. He had a happy end to it. He had Heavenly and Chance go on together, which is a contradiction to the meaning of the play."

Brooks says he wanted to shoot a different ending. He felt "no man waits to be castrated" so he wanted Chance "to do something more: to go and look for the trouble. But M.G.M. felt it was bad enough they were doing the picture. " He wanted Chance to be beaten up and for Princess Kosmonopolis, the alias of Alexandra Del Lago (Geraldine Page) and Lucy (Madeleine Sherwood) to leave town on the same ferry and see Chance on a garbage scow. According to Brooks, MGM executives said "We’ll let you shoot it after we’ve had the preview, and, of course, they never did." Hank Mojeen says an alternative ending was shot, at Long Beach, involving Paige and Sherwood, but was scrapped.

Paul Newman was paid $350,000 plus 10% of the profits to play the lead role. Geraldine Page had played the lead female role on Broadway but producer Pandro Berman was unsure about using her in a film, worried she was insufficiently glamorous to play a movie star. Page did a screen test with an MGM contract actor which was not well received. Berman offered the role to Ava Gardner but she turned it down (which Gardner later regretted). Paul Newman requested another screen test with Page and offered to appear in it with her; Berman says the issue was not Page's acting but with her looks. Another screen test was done, with a wig from Sydney Guilaroff, a gown from Orry-Kelly and make up from William Tuttle. This test was successful and she was cast. Brooks offered the role of Boss Finley to Randolph Scott who turned it down.

Filming started July 6, 1961 and went until October. Brooks said "It’s a very harsh picture, and I didn’t see why the photography had to be as harsh as the content." According to Brooks, the cost was $2.8 million including $600,000 for the play rights, $700,000 for the cast and $1.6 million for overhead.

== Reception ==
=== Box office ===
Variety estimated the film earned $2.7 million in the US and Canada in rentals in 1962. Market analysts thought the film might have done better had it been released a few years earlier. According to MGM records, the film lost $627,000.

=== Critical ===
Variety called it "a glossy hunk of motion picture entertainment."

FilmInk argued that the happy ending of the film hurt its commercial success. "You can have a popular film with a happy ending or a sad ending, that doesn’t matter – what matters is that it’s a just ending. Justice must be served. Chance didn’t deserve a happy ending in Sweet Bird of Youth. (If the filmmakers wanted that ending, they needed to make more changes throughout to justify a happy ending.)"

The film also was one of Roger Ebert's top films of the decade, and held a score of 74% on Rotten Tomatoes based on a total of 19 surveyed critics.

=== Awards and nominations ===
Award	Category	Nominee(s)	Result	Ref.
Academy Awards	Best Actress	Geraldine Page	Nominated	
Academy Awards	Best Supporting Actor	Ed Begley	Won	
Academy Awards	Best Supporting Actress	Shirley Knight	Nominated	
British Academy Film Awards	Best Foreign Actress	Geraldine Page	Nominated	
David di Donatello Awards	Best Foreign Actress	Geraldine Page	Won	
Golden Globe Awards	Best Actor in a Motion Picture – Drama	Paul Newman	Nominated	
Golden Globe Awards	Best Actress in a Motion Picture – Drama	Geraldine Page	Won	
Golden Globe Awards	Best Supporting Actor – Motion Picture	Ed Begley	Nominated	
Golden Globe Awards	Best Supporting Actress – Motion Picture	Shirley Knight	Nominated	
Laurel Awards	Top Male Supporting Performance	Ed Begley	Nominated	

== See also ==
- List of American films of 1962
