= Hondo (film) =

1953 film

- 1953 Italian film poster
- Directed by: John Farrow; John Ford (uncredited, final scenes only)
- Screenplay by: James Edward Grant
- Based on: The Gift of Cochise; 1952 story in Collier's by Louis L'Amour
- Produced by: Robert M. Fellows; John Wayne
- Starring: John Wayne; Geraldine Page; Ward Bond; Michael Pate; James Arness
- Cinematography: Robert Burks; Louis Clyde Stoumen; Archie J. Stout
- Edited by: Ralph Dawson
- Music by: Hugo W. Friedhofer; Emil Newman
- Color process: Warnercolor
- Production company: Wayne-Fellows Productions
- Distributed by: Warner Bros. Pictures
- Release date: November 27, 1953
- Running time: 84 minutes
- Country: United States
- Language: English
- Budget: $3,000,000
- Box office: $4,100,000

Hondo is a 1953 Warnercolor three-dimensional (3D) Western film directed by John Farrow and starring John Wayne and Geraldine Page. The screenplay is based on the 1952 Collier's short story "The Gift of Cochise" by Louis L'Amour. The supporting cast features Ward Bond, James Arness, and Leo Gordon.

The shoot went over schedule, and Farrow had to leave the production, as he was contractually obligated to direct another movie. The final scenes featuring the Apache attack on the circled wagons of the Army and settlers were shot by John Ford, whom Wayne had asked to finish the film; Ford was not credited for this work.

== Plot ==
Homesteader Angie Lowe and her six-year-old son Johnny are doing chores, when soldier Hondo Lane arrives with his dog, carrying his saddle bags and rifle. He was riding dispatch for the U.S. Army Cavalry, had an encounter with Native Americans, and lost his horse. Hondo offers to work for a while to earn a horse, and Angie agrees. Angie repeatedly says that her husband is away herding cattle, but Hondo realizes he has been gone a long time. Hondo encourages her to pack up and return with him to the Army fort, since the treaty with the Apaches was broken and they are planning a war; Angie believes her friendship with the Apaches will keep her safe. That night, she remembers hearing Hondo killed three men. She threatens him with an unloaded gun; he loads it for her.

Hondo mentions that he once lived among the Apache and had an Apache wife who is now dead. He then kisses a confused Angie, who reminds him of his wife, and leaves for the fort. The Apaches later come to the ranch, led by Chief Vittorio and Silva. When Silva touches Angie, Johnny gets her gun and shoots at him. Though he misses, Vittorio is impressed with his bravery and makes him a blood brother, naming him "Small Warrior". Vittorio instructs Angie to care for him well, as he is now an Apache warrior, telling her his own boys were killed by the White man.

At the fort, Hondo sees fellow scout Buffalo Baker. He reports to the major that C Troop was wiped out by Apaches and has a rude introduction to Ed, a settler angry that the cavalry is not better protecting the settlers. In a saloon, Hondo gets into a fight with Ed, whom he later learns is Ed Lowe, Angie's absentee husband. Meanwhile, Vittorio tells Angie he thinks her husband is dead, that Small Warrior needs a dad, and her lodge needs a man. Vittorio tells Angie she is to choose an Apache brave as a husband if her husband does not return before the "planting rains".

The next morning, Ed accuses Hondo of stealing his horse, seeing the "EL" brand. Hondo acknowledges that it does belong to Ed, and that he will be returning it to the latter's house. His friends defend Hondo, who leaves to return the horse to the ranch. Upset about the fight and horse, Ed follows Hondo to bushwhack him. While camped, Hondo is set upon by the Apaches, who also attack Ed. An Indian is about to kill Ed, but Hondo shoots him, saving Ed's life. As Hondo watches the last Apache ride off, Ed moves to shoot him in the back, but Hondo kills him before he can kill Hondo. Hondo sees Ed was clutching a photograph of Johnny, which he takes. The Apaches capture and torture Hondo for information about the cavalry's movements. When Vittorio sees Johnny's photo, he decides to subject Hondo to a one-on-one fight to the death with Silva, whose brother Hondo killed. Hondo is victorious, but lets Silva live. The Apaches drop Hondo off at the ranch, where Angie lies about him being her husband. Vittorio threatens him to raise Small Warrior well. After they leave, Silva kills Sam, Hondo's dog.

Hondo attempts to reveal the truth of Ed's death, but is interrupted by Vittorio's return. The chief says that the pony soldiers will come. He asks Hondo to mislead the cavalry as a test; Hondo refuses to lie, and Vittorio is satisfied. Angie admits she loves Hondo, and they kiss. The next day, the cavalry troops arrive and expect Angie to leave; Hondo and she refuse. While they camp, another scout wants Hondo's rifle and says he will tell Angie what happened to Ed if Hondo refuses. Hondo punches him, but Angie overhears. The cavalry leaves to collect nearby settlers, but Hondo remains with Angie and Johnny.

Hondo prepares to go, but first tells Angie the truth about Ed's death. He also wants to tell Johnny, but she persuades him not to, admitting that she did not love Ed any longer, and she knew what sort of a man he was. She says telling Johnny the truth now would be unkind, and the secret will not follow them to Hondo's ranch in California. Hondo responds to her plea with an Indian word that seals an Apache wife-seeking ceremony, Varlebena, which he says means "forever".

The troops return to the ranch with the settlers, having killed Vittorio in a battle, but with their commanding officer badly wounded. While the Apaches regroup, Hondo, Angie, and Johnny join the wagon train and head for the fort. The Apaches catch up, killing several soldiers; Hondo takes charge of the troop and leads the counterattacks. Hondo kills the new leader, Silva, and the Apaches retreat to decide on a new leader, giving the settlers and soldiers a chance to escape. The wagon train regroups and proceeds to the fort with Hondo remaining in command.

== Cast ==
- John Wayne as Hondo Lane
- Geraldine Page as Angie Lowe
- Ward Bond as Buffalo Baker
- Michael Pate as Vittorio
- James Arness as Lennie
- Rodolfo Acosta as Silva
- Leo Gordon as Ed Lowe
- Tom Irish as Lieutenant McKay
- Lee Aaker as Johnny Lowe
- Paul Fix as Major Sherry
- Rayford Barnes as Pete
- Frank McGrath as Lowe's Partner
- Morry Ogden as Horse Rider in the Opening Scene
- Chuck Roberson as Kloori, Apache Warrior

== Production ==
Wayne's newly formed production company Wayne-Fellows Productions (later Batjac) purchased the rights to Louis L'Amour's short story "The Gift of Cochise" in 1952 and set Wayne's friend and frequent collaborator James Edward Grant to write the adaptation, which expanded the original story, introduced new characters, and added the cavalry subplot. L'Amour was given the rights to write the novelization of the film, which became a bestseller after the film's release. The film shoot was scheduled for the summer of 1953 in the Mexican desert state of Chihuahua in the San Francisco de Conchos region. Today, this region is known for its tourist attractions, such as Lago Colina and the spring pools Los Filtros. It is a green-area region with plenty of fishing and agricultural growth.

Wayne and his producing partner Robert Fellows wanted to shoot the film in the trendsetting 3D format. Warner Bros. Pictures supplied the production with the newly developed "All-Media Camera", which could shoot in any format, including 3D, using twin lenses placed slightly apart to produce the stereoscopic effect necessary for it. Despite being smaller than the twin camera process used previously for 3D, the All-Media Cameras were still bulky and made the film shoot difficult, causing delays when transported to remote desert locations. Further, director John Farrow and director of photography Robert Burks were unfamiliar with the new technology and had trouble adjusting to using it, while the cameras were frequently broken due to wind blowing sand into their mechanisms or from other inclement weather conditions. Farrow used the technology to produce fewer gimmicks than other 3D films did at the time, with only a few scenes showing people or objects, such as gunfire or knives, coming at the camera. Instead, he preferred to use it to increase the depth of the expansive wide shots of the Mexican desert, or when showing figures against a landscape.

The casting of Geraldine Page as the female lead was considered quite puzzling to Wayne and his friends Hollywood at the time. Though Hondo was not her first film, she had been known primarily as a Broadway stage actress and employed the method acting style deemed by some to be too introspective for film and especially for Westerns. However, she later received an Oscar nomination for Best Supporting Actress, the first of only two acting nominations ever for a film shot or presented in 3D.

The exterior of the Church of San Francisco de Asís in the village of San Francisco de Conchos was used for the army camp scenes. John Ford shot the final scenes of the wagon-train attack as a favor for Wayne when Farrow had to leave the film before its completion due to a conflicting contractual obligation to begin another film. Ford accepted no credit for directing the last sequence of the film.

John Wayne later said John Farrow "didn't really have a great deal to do with" the film. "Everything was set up before he came on it...It was written and I went out and looked for locations and picked the locations where each scene would be shot. I went back and brought the cameraman, and they said there's no color here. I said wait until I show you, and within 17 miles of town, I had white molten rock, blue pools of water, black buttes, [and] big chalk-white buttes. We were using 3D. We made it in 3D, but then it was never released in that, because Warner Bros. decided to give up and use the Fox system."

== Theatrical release ==
Even with the production troubles that came with the location shooting in 3D, the studio thought it was a worthwhile venture, since 3D pictures were at the height of popularity at the time of the film's development. By the time the film was completed, though, public interest in 3D had started to wane. The distributing studio Warner Bros. did everything it could to promote its new 3D camera process, and went beyond the typical gimmicks used by other popular 3D films at the time, such as House of Wax, producing a richer sense of perspective.

Hondo was released on November 27, 1953, and was presented in the 3D format in only extremely few if any theaters at the time; theaters were unable to show the film in the stereoscopic format because the Polaroid 3D projection system required a brighter and more light-reflective screen, referred to as a "silver screen", which was an added cost theater owners were reluctant to pay. The film has an intermission, which comes right after Hondo is captured by the Apaches. This is included on the DVD version.

== Reception ==
The film ended up becoming quite popular with audiences, eventually grossing $4.1 million at the box office and placing it in the top-20 moneymakers for that year.

On the review aggregator website Rotten Tomatoes, 90% of 10 critics' reviews are positive, with an average rating of 7.3/10. Metacritic, which uses a weighted average, assigned the film a score of 79 out of 100, based on 7 critics, indicating "generally favorable" reviews.

== Restoration and home media ==
An initial restoration of Hondo was overseen by Wayne's son Michael, head of Batjac Productions, in the late 1980s, culminating in a syndicated broadcast of the film in June 1991 on American over-the-air stations in anaglyph 3D. Some 3D glasses were sold to viewers, with proceeds going to charity.

A frame-by-frame digital restoration by Prasad Corporation of the film was later completed, and the DVD of it was released on October 11, 2005. In 2007, a newly restored version of the film was presented by the Academy of Motion Picture Arts and Sciences as part of its Science and Technology Council’s 3-D program.

The 3D version of Hondo has yet to be released on either DVD or Blu-Ray. A restored 3D theatrical version was exhibited for a week in 2015 at the Museum of Modern Art in New York City, and it was projected the following year at New York's Film Forum, introduced at both venues by Michael Wayne's wife Gretchen Wayne.

== References in popular culture ==
Boston Celtics Hall of Fame swingman John Havlicek was nicknamed Hondo by a childhood friend who thought his demeanor resembled that of Wayne's character.

Part of a 1988 episode of Married... with Children, titled "All in the Family", has Al Bundy readying himself to watch Hondo in peace during a three-day weekend, but Peggy's family comes to visit, and their ensuing problems prevent him from seeing the film, just as their antics prevented him from seeing Shane the previous year. A later 1994 episode of Married... with Children, titled "Assault and Batteries", has a subplot in which Al is desperate not to miss another television airing of Hondo, because as he explains, it is the best John Wayne movie and it only airs "once every 17 years". Al does miss this airing at the end of the episode and would have to wait until February 18, 2011, to see it again. (Though in real life, the film was released on VHS only a few months later.) Al holds the film in very high esteem, once telling Peggy's family members, "Your lives are meaningless compared to Hondo!"

Two later John Wayne Westerns contain subtle references to Hondo. In Rio Lobo (1970), a wanted poster for Hondo Lane can be seen on a wall in the sheriff's office. In the 1973 film The Train Robbers, the chief male and female characters (played by Wayne and Ann-Margret) are Lane and Mrs. Lowe, the same names as in "Hondo".

In Men in Black 3 (2012), Agent K refers to Agent J as "Hondo" when J stares at him as he drives: "You lose something over here, Hondo?"
