= List of American films of 1952 =

American films released in 1952

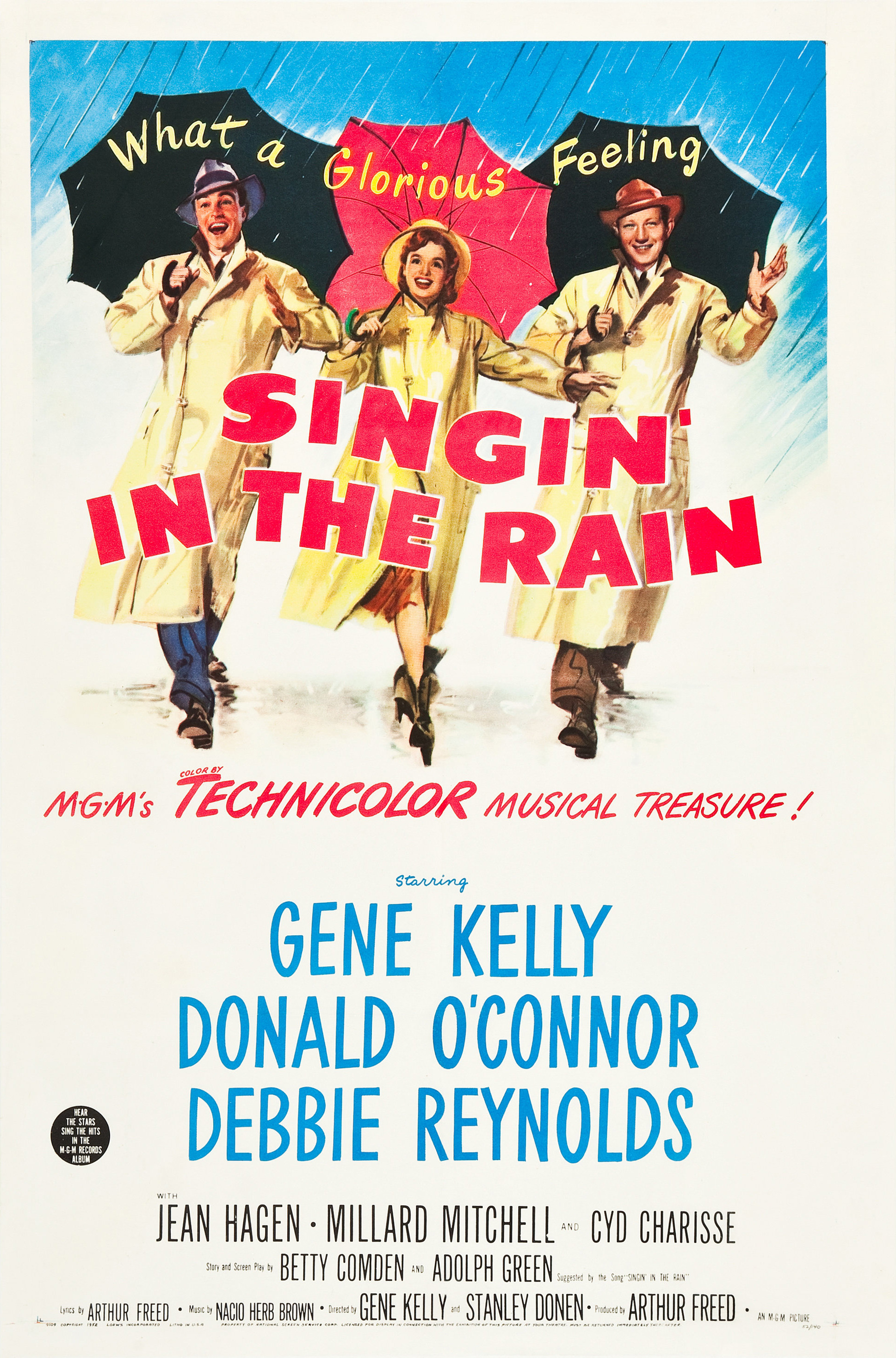
Singin' in the Rain.

More than 320 American feature films were released in 1952.
The Greatest Show on Earth won the Academy Award for Best Picture.

== A-B ==
Title	Director	Cast	Genre	Notes
5 Fingers	Joseph L. Mankiewicz	James Mason, Danielle Darrieux, Michael Rennie	Drama	20th Century Fox
Aaron Slick from Punkin Crick	Claude Binyon	Alan Young, Dinah Shore, Adele Jergens	Comedy	Paramount
Abbott and Costello Meet Captain Kidd	Charles Lamont	Abbott and Costello, Charles Laughton, Hillary Brooke	Comedy	Warner Bros.
About Face	Roy Del Ruth	Gordon MacRae, Eddie Bracken, Virginia Gibson	Comedy	Warner Bros.
Above and Beyond	Melvin Frank, Norman Panama	Robert Taylor, Eleanor Parker, James Whitmore	War	MGM
Actors and Sin	Ben Hecht	Edward G. Robinson, Eddie Albert, Marsha Hunt	Comedy	United Artists
Affair in Trinidad	Vincent Sherman	Rita Hayworth, Glenn Ford, Torin Thatcher	Film noir	Columbia
African Treasure	Ford Beebe	Johnny Sheffield, Laurette Luez, Lyle Talbot	Adventure	Monogram
Against All Flags	George Sherman	Errol Flynn, Maureen O'Hara, Anthony Quinn	Adventure	Universal
Aladdin and His Lamp	Lew Landers	Johnny Sands, Patricia Medina, Richard Erdman	Adventure	Monogram
Androcles and the Lion	Chester Erskine	Jean Simmons, Victor Mature, Alan Young	Historical Epic	RKO. Based on the play
Anything Can Happen	George Seaton	José Ferrer, Kim Hunter, Kurt Kasznar	Drama	Paramount
Apache Country	George Archainbaud	Gene Autry, Carolina Cotton, Harry Lauter	Western	Columbia
Apache War Smoke	Harold F. Kress	Gilbert Roland, Glenda Farrell, Robert Horton	Western	MGM
April in Paris	David Butler	Ray Bolger, Doris Day, Claude Dauphin	Musical	Warner Bros.
Arctic Flight	Lew Landers	Wayne Morris, Lola Albright, Alan Hale Jr.	Drama	Monogram
Army Bound	Paul Landres	Stanley Clements, Karen Sharpe, Steve Brodie	Action	Monogram
Assignment – Paris!	Phil Karlson	Dana Andrews, Märta Torén, George Sanders	Spy drama	Columbia
At Sword's Point	Lewis Allen	Cornel Wilde, Maureen O'Hara, Gladys Cooper	Adventure	RKO
The Atomic City	Jerry Hopper	Gene Barry, Lydia Clarke, Nancy Gates	Drama	Paramount
Babes in Bagdad	Edgar G. Ulmer	Paulette Goddard, Gypsy Rose Lee, John Boles	Comedy	United Artists
Back at the Front	George Sherman	Tom Ewell, Harvey Lembeck, Mari Blanchard	Comedy	Universal
The Bad and the Beautiful	Vincente Minnelli	Lana Turner, Kirk Douglas, Walter Pidgeon, Dick Powell, Barry Sullivan, Gloria Grahame	Drama	MGM. Winner of 5 Academy Awards
Bal Tabarin	Philip Ford	Claire Carleton, Steve Brodie, Steven Geray	Drama	Republic
Barbed Wire	George Archainbaud	Gene Autry, Leonard Penn, Pat Buttram	Western	Columbia
The Battle at Apache Pass	George Sherman	John Lund, Jeff Chandler, Susan Cabot	Western	Universal
Battles of Chief Pontiac	Felix E. Feist	Lex Barker, Helen Westcott, Lon Chaney Jr.	Western	Realart
Battle Zone	Lesley Selander	John Hodiak, Linda Christian, Stephen McNally	War	Allied Artists
Because of You	Joseph Pevney	Loretta Young, Jeff Chandler, Frances Dee	Drama	Universal
Because You're Mine	Alexander Hall	Mario Lanza, Doretta Morrow, James Whitmore	Musical	MGM
Bela Lugosi Meets a Brooklyn Gorilla	William Beaudine	Bela Lugosi, Duke Mitchell, Sammy Petrillo	Comedy	Realart
The Belle of New York	Charles Walters	Fred Astaire, Vera-Ellen, Marjorie Main	Musical comedy	MGM
Belles on Their Toes	Henry Levin	Jeanne Crain, Myrna Loy, Debra Paget	Comedy	20th Century Fox
Bend of the River	Anthony Mann	James Stewart, Rock Hudson, Arthur Kennedy	Western	Universal
Beware, My Lovely	Harry Horner	Ida Lupino, Robert Ryan, Taylor Holmes	Film noir	RKO
Big Jim McLain	Edward Ludwig	John Wayne, James Arness, Nancy Olson	Drama	Warner Bros.
The Big Sky	Howard Hawks	Kirk Douglas, Elizabeth Threatt, Dewey Martin	Western	RKO
The Big Trees	Felix E. Feist	Kirk Douglas, Eve Miller, Patrice Wymore	Drama	Warner Bros.
The Black Castle	Nathan H. Juran	Richard Greene, Boris Karloff, Stephen McNally	Horror	Universal
Blackbeard the Pirate	Raoul Walsh	Robert Newton, Linda Darnell, William Bendix	Adventure	RKO
Black Hills Ambush	Harry Keller	Allan Lane, Leslie Banning, Eddy Waller	Western	Republic
The Black Lash	Ron Ormond	Lash LaRue, Peggy Stewart, Kermit Maynard	Western	Realart
The Blazing Forest	Edward Ludwig	John Payne, Agnes Moorehead, William Demarest	Adventure	Paramount
Bloodhounds of Broadway	Harmon Jones	Mitzi Gaynor, Scott Brady, Marguerite Chapman	Musical	20th Century Fox
Blue Canadian Rockies	George Archainbaud	Gene Autry, Gail Davis, Carolina Cotton	Western	Columbia
Bomba and the Jungle Girl	Ford Beebe	Johnny Sheffield, Karen Sharpe, Walter Sande	Adventure	Monogram
Bonzo Goes to College	Frederick de Cordova	Maureen O'Sullivan, Edmund Gwenn, Charles Drake	Comedy	Universal
Boots Malone	William Dieterle	William Holden, Stanley Clements, Basil Ruysdael	Drama	Columbia
Border Saddlemates	William Witney	Rex Allen, Mary Ellen Kay, Roy Barcroft	Western	Republic
Brave Warrior	Spencer Bennet	Jon Hall, Christine Larson, Michael Ansara,	Western	Columbia
Breakdown	Edmond Angelo	Ann Richards, William Bishop, Anne Gwynne	Film noir	Realart
The Brigand	Phil Karlson	Anthony Dexter, Jody Lawrence, Gale Robbins	Adventure	Columbia
Bronco Buster	Budd Boetticher	John Lund, Scott Brady, Joyce Holden	Western	Universal
Buffalo Bill in Tomahawk Territory	Bernard B. Ray	Clayton Moore, Rodd Redwing, Chief Yowlachie	Western	United Artists
Bugles in the Afternoon	Roy Rowland	Ray Milland, Helena Carter, Hugh Marlowe	Western	Warner Bros.
The Bushwackers	Rod Amateau	John Ireland, Lawrence Tierney, Dorothy Malone	Western	Realart
Bwana Devil	Arch Oboler	Robert Stack, Nigel Bruce, Barbara Britton	Adventure	United Artists

== C-D ==
Title	Director	Cast	Genre	Notes
California Conquest	Lew Landers	Cornel Wilde, Teresa Wright, Lisa Ferraday	Western	Columbia
Canyon Ambush	Lewis D. Collins	Johnny Mack Brown, Phyllis Coates, Lee Roberts	Western	Monogram
Captain Pirate	Ralph Murphy	Louis Hayward, Patricia Medina, John Sutton	Adventure	Columbia
The Captive City	Robert Wise	John Forsythe, Joan Camden, Victor Sutherland	Film noir	United Artists
Captive of Billy the Kid	Fred C. Brannon	Allan Lane, Grant Withers, Penny Edwards	Western	Republic
Captive Women	Stuart Gilmore	Ron Randell, Margaret Field, Gloria Saunders	Science Fiction	RKO
Carbine Williams	Richard Thorpe	James Stewart, Jean Hagen, Wendell Corey	Biography	MGM
Caribbean Gold	Edward Ludwig	Arlene Dahl, John Payne, Cedric Hardwicke	Adventure	Paramount
Carrie	William Wyler	Jennifer Jones, Laurence Olivier, Miriam Hopkins	Drama	Paramount
Carson City	André de Toth	Randolph Scott, Raymond Massey, Lucille Norman	Western	Warner Bros.
Cattle Town	Noel M. Smith	Dennis Morgan, Amanda Blake, Rita Moreno	Western	Warner Bros.
The Cimarron Kid	Budd Boetticher	Audie Murphy, Beverly Tyler, Yvette Dugay	Western	Universal
Clash by Night	Fritz Lang	Barbara Stanwyck, Robert Ryan, Marilyn Monroe	Drama	RKO
Colorado Sundown	William Witney	Rex Allen, Mary Ellen Kay, Slim Pickens	Western	Republic
Come Back, Little Sheba	Daniel Mann	Burt Lancaster, Shirley Booth, Terry Moore	Drama	Paramount. Oscar for Booth
Confidence Girl	Andrew L. Stone	Tom Conway, Hillary Brooke, Jack Kruschen	Film noir	United Artists
The Crimson Pirate	Robert Siodmak	Burt Lancaster, Eva Bartók, Nick Cravat	Adventure	Warner Bros.
Cripple Creek	Ray Nazarro	George Montgomery, Jerome Courtland, Karin Booth	Western	Columbia
Deadline – U.S.A.	Richard Brooks	Humphrey Bogart, Ethel Barrymore, Kim Hunter	Crime drama	20th Century Fox
Dead Man's Trail	Lewis D. Collins	Johnny Mack Brown, Barbara Woodell, James Ellison	Western	Monogram
Denver and Rio Grande	Byron Haskin	Edmond O'Brien, Sterling Hayden, Dean Jagger	Western	Paramount
Desert Passage	Lesley Selander	Tim Holt, Richard Martin, Dorothy Patrick	Western	RKO
Desert Pursuit	George Blair	Wayne Morris, Virginia Grey, George Tobias	Western	Monogram
Desperadoes' Outpost	Philip Ford	Allan Lane, Eddy Waller, Claudia Barrett	Western	Republic
Desperate Search	Joseph H. Lewis	Howard Keel, Jane Greer, Keenan Wynn	Adventure	MGM
The Devil Makes Three	Andrew Marton	Gene Kelly, Pier Angeli, Richard Egan	Thriller	MGM
Diplomatic Courier	Henry Hathaway	Tyrone Power, Patricia Neal, Hildegard Knef	Drama	20th Century Fox
Don't Bother to Knock	Roy Ward Baker	Marilyn Monroe, Richard Widmark, Anne Bancroft	Drama	20th Century Fox
Dreamboat	Claude Binyon	Clifton Webb, Ginger Rogers, Anne Francis	Comedy	20th Century Fox
The Duel at Silver Creek	Don Siegel	Audie Murphy, Faith Domergue, Susan Cabot	Western	Universal

== E-G ==
Title	Director	Cast	Genre	Notes
Eight Iron Men	Edward Dmytryk	Bonar Colleano, Lee Marvin, Richard Kiley	War	Columbia
Everything I Have Is Yours	Robert Z. Leonard	Marge Champion, Gower Champion, Dennis O'Keefe	Musical	MGM
The Fabulous Senorita	R. G. Springsteen	Estelita Rodriguez, Robert Clarke, Rita Moreno	Musical comedy	Republic
Face to Face	John Brahm	James Mason, Robert Preston, Gene Lockhart	Drama	RKO
Fargo	Lewis D. Collins	Bill Elliott, Phyllis Coates, Myron Healey	Western	Monogram
Fearless Fagan	Stanley Donen	Janet Leigh, Carleton Carpenter, Keenan Wynn	Comedy	MGM
Feudin' Fools	William Beaudine	Leo Gorcey, Huntz Hall, Anne Kimbell	Comedy	Monogram
The Fighter	Herbert Kline	Richard Conte, Vanessa Brown, Lee J. Cobb	Film noir	United Artists
Finders Keepers	Frederick De Cordova	Tom Ewell, Julie Adams, Evelyn Varden	Comedy	Universal
The First Time	Frank Tashlin	Robert Cummings, Barbara Hale, Jeff Donnell	Comedy Drama	Columbia
Flaming Feather	Ray Enright	Sterling Hayden, Barbara Rush, Forrest Tucker	Western	Paramount
Flat Top	Lesley Selander	Sterling Hayden, Richard Carlson, John Bromfield	Drama	Allied Artists
Flesh and Fury	Joseph Pevney	Tony Curtis, Jan Sterling, Mona Freeman	Film noir	Universal
For Men Only	Paul Henreid	Paul Henreid, Margaret Field, Kathleen Hughes	Drama	Lippert
Fort Osage	Lesley Selander	Rod Cameron, Jane Nigh, Morris Ankrum	Western	Monogram
The Four Poster	Irving Reis	Rex Harrison, Lilli Palmer	Comedy Drama	Columbia. Based on The Fourposter
Francis Goes to West Point	Arthur Lubin	Donald O'Connor, Lori Nelson, Alice Kelley	Comedy	Universal
The Frontier Phantom	Ron Ormond	Lash LaRue, Al St. John, Virginia Herrick	Western	Realart
Geisha Girl	George Breakston	Steve Forrest, Martha Hyer, Tetsu Nakamura	Adventure	Realart
A Girl in Every Port	Chester Erskine	Groucho Marx, Marie Wilson, William Bendix	Comedy	RKO
The Girl in White	John Sturges	June Allyson, Arthur Kennedy, Mildred Dunnock	Drama	MGM
Glory Alley	Raoul Walsh	Ralph Meeker, Leslie Caron, Gilbert Roland	Musical Drama	MGM
Gobs and Gals	R. G. Springsteen	Robert Hutton, Cathy Downs, George Bernard	Comedy	Republic
The Golden Hawk	Sidney Salkow	Rhonda Fleming, Sterling Hayden, Helena Carter	Adventure	Columbia
Gold Fever	Leslie Goodwins	Ralph Morgan, Gene Roth, John Calvert	Western	Monogram
The Greatest Show on Earth	Cecil B. DeMille	Charlton Heston, Betty Hutton, James Stewart, Cornel Wilde, Dorothy Lamour, Henry Wilcoxon	Drama	Paramount. Won 2 Academy Awards including Best Picture
The Green Glove	Rudolph Maté	Glenn Ford, Geraldine Brooks, Cedric Hardwicke	Film noir	United Artists. Co-production with France
The Gunman	Lewis D. Collins	Whip Wilson, Phyllis Coates, Fuzzy Knight	Western	Monogram

== H-J ==
Title	Director	Cast	Genre	Notes
The Half-Breed	Stuart Gilmore	Robert Young, Janis Carter, Barton MacLane	Western	RKO
Hangman's Knot	Roy Huggins	Randolph Scott, Donna Reed, Claude Jarman	Western	Columbia
Hans Christian Andersen	Charles Vidor	Danny Kaye, Farley Granger, Zizi Jeanmaire	Musical, Biography	RKO; 6 Oscar nominations
The Happy Time	Richard Fleischer	Charles Boyer, Louis Jourdan, Marsha Hunt,	Comedy drama	Columbia
Harem Girl	Edward Bernds	Joan Davis, Peggie Castle, Arthur Blake	Comedy	Columbia
Has Anybody Seen My Gal	Douglas Sirk	Piper Laurie, Rock Hudson, Charles Coburn	Romance	Universal
The Hawk of Wild River	Fred F. Sears	Charles Starrett, Clayton Moore, Jock Mahoney	Western	Columbia
Hellgate	Charles Warren	Sterling Hayden, Joan Leslie, Ward Bond	Western	Lippert
Here Come the Marines	William Beaudine	Leo Gorcey, Huntz Hall, Myrna Dell	Comedy	Monogram
Here Come the Nelsons	Frederick de Cordova	Ozzie Nelson, Harriet Nelson, Rock Hudson	Comedy	Universal; based on the TV series
Hiawatha	Kurt Neumann	Vince Edwards, Keith Larsen, Yvette Dugay	Adventure	Allied Artists; based on the poem
High Noon	Fred Zinnemann	Gary Cooper, Grace Kelly, Katy Jurado	Western	United Artists; won 4 Oscars
Hold That Line	William Beaudine	Leo Gorcey, Huntz Hall, Veda Ann Borg	Comedy	Monogram
Holiday for Sinners	Gerald Mayer	Gig Young, Janice Rule, Janice Rule	Romance	MGM
Hong Kong	Lewis R. Foster	Ronald Reagan, Rhonda Fleming, Nigel Bruce	Adventure	Paramount
Hoodlum Empire	Joseph Kane	Claire Trevor, Brian Donlevy, Vera Ralston	Film noir	Republic
Horizons West	Budd Boetticher	Robert Ryan, Julie Adams, Rock Hudson	Western	Universal
Hurricane Smith	Jerry Hopper	Yvonne de Carlo, John Ireland, Forrest Tucker	Adventure	Paramount
I Dream of Jeanie	Allan Dwan	Ray Middleton, Bill Shirley, Lynn Bari	Musical, biography	Republic; story of Stephen Foster
Indian Uprising	Ray Nazarro	George Montgomery, Audrey Long, Carl Benton Reid	Western	Columbia
Invasion U.S.A.	Alfred Green	Gerald Mohr, Dan O'Herlihy, Peggie Castle	Cold War	Columbia
Invitation	Gottfried Reinhardt	Van Johnson, Dorothy McGuire, Ruth Roman	Drama	MGM
The Iron Mistress	Gordon Douglas	Alan Ladd, Virginia Mayo, Phyllis Kirk	Western	Warner Bros.
It Grows on Trees	Arthur Lubin	Irene Dunne, Dean Jagger, Joan Evans	Comedy	Universal. Dunne's final film
Ivanhoe	Richard Thorpe	Robert Taylor, Elizabeth Taylor, Joan Fontaine, George Sanders	Adventure	MGM. Based on Sir Walter Scott novel; 2 Oscar nominations
Jack and the Beanstalk	Jean Yarbrough	Abbott and Costello, Dorothy Ford, Buddy Baer	Comedy	Warner Bros.
Japanese War Bride	King Vidor	Shirley Yamaguchi, Don Taylor, Marie Windsor	Drama	20th Century Fox
The Jazz Singer	Michael Curtiz	Danny Thomas, Peggy Lee, Eduard Franz	Musical drama	Warner Bros.; remake of 1927 film; remade in 1980
Jet Job	William Beaudine	Stanley Clements, John Litel, Elena Verdugo	Action	Allied Artists
Jumping Jacks	Norman Taurog	Dean Martin, Jerry Lewis, Mona Freeman	Comedy	Paramount
Junction City	Ray Nazarro	Charles Starrett, Kathleen Case, Jock Mahoney	Western	Columbia
The Jungle	William Berke	Rod Cameron, Cesar Romero, Marie Windsor	Adventure	Lippert
Jungle Jim in the Forbidden Land	Lew Landers	Johnny Weissmuller, Angela Greene, Jean Willes	Adventure	Columbia
Just Across the Street	Joseph Pevney	Ann Sheridan, John Lund, Cecil Kellaway	Comedy	Universal
Just for You	Elliott Nugent	Bing Crosby, Jane Wyman, Ethel Barrymore	Musical	Paramount
Just This Once	Don Weis	Janet Leigh, Peter Lawford, Lewis Stone	Comedy	MGM

== K-L ==
Title	Director	Cast	Genre	Notes
Kangaroo	Lewis Milestone	Maureen O'Hara, Peter Lawford, Finlay Currie	Drama	20th Century Fox
Kansas City Confidential	Phil Karlson	John Payne, Coleen Gray, Preston Foster	Film noir	United Artists
Kansas Territory	Lewis D. Collins	Bill Elliott, Peggy Stewart, Lane Bradford	Western	Monogram
The Kid from Broken Gun	Fred F. Sears	Charles Starrett, Jock Mahoney, Angela Stevens	Western	Columbia
Kid Monk Baroni	Harold D. Schuster	Bruce Cabot, Leonard Nimoy, Allene Roberts	Film noir	Realart
Lady in the Iron Mask	Ralph Murphy	Patricia Medina, Louis Hayward, John Sutton	Adventure	20th Century Fox. Three Musketeers story
Lady Possessed	Roy Kellino, William Spier	James Mason, June Havoc, Stephen Dunne	Film noir	Republic
Laramie Mountains	Ray Nazarro	Charles Starrett, Jock Mahoney, Marshall Reed	Western	Columbia
The Last Musketeer	William Witney	Rex Allen, Mary Ellen Kay, Slim Pickens	Western	Republic
Last Train from Bombay	Fred F. Sears	Jon Hall, Christine Larson, Lisa Ferraday	Drama	Columbia
The Las Vegas Story	Robert Stevenson	Jane Russell, Victor Mature, Vincent Price	Film noir	RKO
Leadville Gunslinger	Harry Keller	Allan Lane, Elaine Riley, Grant Withers	Western	Republic
Limelight	Charles Chaplin	Charlie Chaplin, Claire Bloom, Nigel Bruce	Comedy	United Artists; belated Oscar for Best Score
The Lion and the Horse	Louis King	Steve Cochran, Ray Teal, Bob Steele	Western	Warner Bros.
Loan Shark	Seymour Friedman	George Raft, Dorothy Hart, Paul Stewart	Film noir	Lippert
Lone Star	Vincent Sherman	Clark Gable, Ava Gardner, Broderick Crawford	Western	MGM
Lost in Alaska	Jean Yarbrough	Abbott and Costello, Mitzi Green, Bruce Cabot	Comedy	Universal
Love Is Better Than Ever	Stanley Donen	Elizabeth Taylor, Larry Parks, Josephine Hutchinson	Romance	MGM
Love Island	Bud Pollard	Paul Valentine, Eva Gabor, Malcolm Lee Beggs	Comedy	Astor
Lovely to Look At	Mervyn LeRoy	Kathryn Grayson, Red Skelton, Howard Keel	Musical	MGM
Lure of the Wilderness	Jean Negulesco	Jean Peters, Jeffrey Hunter, Constance Smith	Adventure	20th Century Fox
The Lusty Men	Nicholas Ray, Robert Parrish	Robert Mitchum, Susan Hayward, Arthur Kennedy	Western	RKO
Lydia Bailey	Jean Negulesco	Dale Robertson, Anne Francis, Charles Korvin	Historical	20th Century Fox

== M-N ==
Title	Director	Cast	Genre	Notes
Ma and Pa Kettle at the Fair	Charles Barton	Marjorie Main, Percy Kilbride, Lori Nelson	Comedy	Universal
Macao	Josef von Sternberg, Nicholas Ray	Robert Mitchum, Jane Russell, William Bendix, Gloria Grahame	Film noir	RKO
Man from the Black Hills	Thomas Carr	Johnny Mack Brown, James Ellison, Lane Bradford	Western	Monogram
Mara Maru	Gordon Douglas	Errol Flynn, Ruth Roman, Raymond Burr	Adventure	Warner Bros.
The Marrying Kind	George Cukor	Judy Holliday, Aldo Ray, Madge Kennedy	Comedy	Columbia
The Maverick	Thomas Carr	Bill Elliott, Phyllis Coates, Myron Healey	Western	Allied Artists
Meet Danny Wilson	Joseph Pevney	Frank Sinatra, Shelley Winters, Alex Nicol	Crime, Drama, Film Noir, Musical	Universal
The Member of the Wedding	Fred Zinnemann	Julie Harris, Ethel Waters, Brandon deWilde	Drama	Columbia; based on novel by Carson McCullers
The Merry Widow	Curtis Bernhardt	Fernando Lamas, Lana Turner, Una Merkel	Musical	MGM
Million Dollar Mermaid	Mervyn LeRoy	Victor Mature, Esther Williams, Walter Pidgeon	Musical biopic	MGM; based on life of Annette Kellerman
The Miracle of Our Lady of Fatima	John Brahm	Gilbert Roland, Sherry Jackson, Jay Novello	Drama	Warner Bros.
Les Misérables	Lewis Milestone	Michael Rennie, Robert Newton, Debra Paget	Drama	20th Century Fox; based on novel by Victor Hugo
Models Inc.	Reginald LeBorg	Howard Duff, Coleen Gray, Marjorie Reynolds	Film noir	Universal
Monkey Business	Howard Hawks	Cary Grant, Ginger Rogers, Marilyn Monroe	Screwball comedy	20th Century Fox
Monsoon	Rod Amateau	Ursula Thiess, Diana Douglas, George Nader	Drama	United Artists
Montana Belle	Allan Dwan	Jane Russell, George Brent, Scott Brady	Western	RKO
Montana Incident	Lewis D. Collins	Whip Wilson, Noel Neill, Peggy Stewart	Western	Monogram
Montana Territory	Ray Nazarro	Lon McCallister, Wanda Hendrix, Preston Foster	Western	Columbia
Mr. Walkie Talkie	Fred Guiol	William Tracy, Joe Sawyer, Margia Dean	Comedy	Lippert
Mutiny	Edward Dmytryk	Mark Stevens, Angela Lansbury, Patric Knowles	Adventure	United Artists
My Cousin Rachel	Henry Koster	Olivia de Havilland, Richard Burton, Audrey Dalton	Mystery	20th Century Fox
My Man and I	William Wellman	Shelley Winters, Ricardo Montalbán, Claire Trevor	Drama	MGM
My Pal Gus	Robert Parrish	Richard Widmark, Joanne Dru, Audrey Totter	Comedy	20th Century Fox
My Six Convicts	Hugo Fregonese	Gilbert Roland, Millard Mitchell, Marshall Thompson	Comedy	Columbia. Golden Globe for Mitchell
My Son John	Leo McCarey	Dean Jagger, Helen Hayes, Van Heflin	Drama	Paramount
My Wife's Best Friend	Richard Sale	Anne Baxter, Macdonald Carey, Cecil Kellaway	Comedy	20th Century Fox
The Narrow Margin	Richard Fleischer	Charles McGraw, Marie Windsor, Jacqueline White	Film noir	RKO
Night Raiders	Howard Bretherton	Whip Wilson, Lois Hall, Fuzzy Knight	Western	Monogram
Night Stage to Galveston	George Archainbaud	Gene Autry, Virginia Huston, Thurston Hall	Western	Columbia
Night Without Sleep	Roy Ward Baker	Linda Darnell, Hildegarde Neff, Gary Merrill	Film noir	20th Century Fox
No Holds Barred	William Beaudine	Leo Gorcey, Huntz Hall, Marjorie Reynolds	Comedy	Monogram
No Room for the Groom	Douglas Sirk	Tony Curtis, Piper Laurie, Spring Byington	Comedy	Universal
No Time for Flowers	Don Siegel	Viveca Lindfors, Paul Hubschmid, Ludwig Stössel	Comedy	RKO

== O-R ==
Title	Director	Cast	Genre	Notes
O. Henry's Full House	5 Directors	Charles Laughton, Marilyn Monroe, Anne Baxter	Anthology	20th Century Fox; based on 5 stories by O. Henry
Okinawa	Leigh Jason	Pat O'Brien, Cameron Mitchell, Richard Denning	War	Columbia
Oklahoma Annie	R. G. Springsteen	Judy Canova, Grant Withers, John Russell	Western comedy	Republic
Old Oklahoma Plains	William Witney	Rex Allen, Slim Pickens, Roy Barcroft	Western	Republic
The Old West	George Archainbaud	Gene Autry, Gail Davis, Lyle Talbot	Western	Columbia
One Big Affair	Peter Godfrey	Evelyn Keyes, Dennis O'Keefe, Mary Anderson	Comedy	United Artists
One Minute to Zero	Tay Garnett	Robert Mitchum, Ann Blyth, Charles McGraw	War	RKO
Operation Secret	Lewis Seiler	Cornel Wilde, Phyllis Thaxter, Steve Cochran	Drama	Warner Bros.
The Outcasts of Poker Flat	Joseph M. Newman	Miriam Hopkins, Dale Robertson, Anne Baxter	Western	20th Century Fox. Remake of 1919, 1937 films
Outlaw Women	Sam Newfield	Marie Windsor, Carla Balenda, Richard Rober	Western	Lippert
The Pace That Thrills	Leon Barsha	Bill Williams, Frank McHugh, Carla Balenda	Action	RKO
Park Row	Samuel Fuller	Gene Evans, Herbert Heyes, Mary Welch	Drama	United Artists
Pat and Mike	George Cukor	Katharine Hepburn, Spencer Tracy, Aldo Ray	Comedy	MGM
The Pathfinder	Sidney Salkow	George Montgomery, Helena Carter, Walter Kingsford	Adventure	Columbia
Paula	Rudolph Maté	Loretta Young, Kent Smith, Alexander Knox	Film noir	Columbia
Phone Call from a Stranger	Jean Negulesco	Shelley Winters, Gary Merrill, Bette Davis	Drama	20th Century Fox
Plymouth Adventure	Clarence Brown	Spencer Tracy, Gene Tierney, Van Johnson	Historical	MGM
Pony Soldier	Joseph M. Newman	Tyrone Power, Robert Horton, Thomas Gomez	Western	20th Century Fox
The Pride of St. Louis	Harmon Jones	Dan Dailey, Joanne Dru, Richard Crenna	Biography	20th Century Fox. Story of Dizzy Dean
The Prisoner of Zenda	Richard Thorpe	Stewart Granger, Deborah Kerr, James Mason	Adventure	MGM. Remake of the 1937 film
The Quiet Man	John Ford	Maureen O'Hara, John Wayne, Victor McLaglen	Romantic comedy	Republic; Oscars for Ford, cinematography
The Raiders	Lesley Selander	Richard Conte, Barbara Britton, Barbara Britton	Western	Universal
Rainbow 'Round My Shoulder	Richard Quine	Frankie Laine, Billy Daniels, Charlotte Austin	Musical	Columbia
Rancho Notorious	Fritz Lang	Marlene Dietrich, Arthur Kennedy, Mel Ferrer	Western	RKO
Red Ball Express	Budd Boetticher	Jeff Chandler, Alex Nicol, Sidney Poitier	War	Universal
Red Planet Mars	Harry Horner	Peter Graves, Andrea King, Herbert Berghof	Science fiction	United Artists
Red Skies of Montana	Joseph M. Newman	Richard Widmark, Constance Smith, Richard Boone	Adventure	20th Century Fox
Red Snow	Harry S. Franklin, Boris Petroff	Guy Madison, Ray Mala, Carole Mathews	Adventure	Columbia
Retreat, Hell!	Joseph H. Lewis	Frank Lovejoy, Russ Tamblyn, Anita Louise	War	Warner Bros.
Return of the Texan	Delmer Daves	Dale Robertson, Joanne Dru, Walter Brennan	Western	20th Century Fox
Ride the Man Down	Joseph Kane	Brian Donlevy, Ella Raines, Barbara Britton	Western	Republic
The Ring	Kurt Neumann	Lalo Rios, Gerald Mohr, Rita Moreno	Sports drama	United Artists
Road Agent	Lesley Selander	Tim Holt, Noreen Nash, Dorothy Patrick	Western	RKO
Road to Bali	Hal Walker	Bing Crosby, Bob Hope, Dorothy Lamour	Comedy	Paramount; 6th of Road to... series
Rodeo	William Beaudine	Jane Nigh, John Archer, Wallace Ford	Sports	Monogram
Room for One More	Norman Taurog	Cary Grant, Betsy Drake, Lurene Tuttle	Comedy drama	Warner Bros.
The Rose Bowl Story	William Beaudine	Marshall Thompson, Vera Miles, Richard Rober	Romance	Monogram
Rose of Cimarron	Harry Keller	Mala Powers, Jack Buetel, Bill Williams	Western	20th Century Fox
The Rough, Tough West	Ray Nazarro	Charles Starrett, Carolina Cotton, Jock Mahoney	Western	Columbia
Ruby Gentry	King Vidor	Jennifer Jones, Charlton Heston, Karl Malden	Drama	20th Century Fox

== S-T ==
Title	Director	Cast	Genre	Notes
Sailor Beware	Hal Walker	Dean Martin, Jerry Lewis, Corinne Calvet	Comedy	Paramount
Sally and Saint Anne	Rudolph Maté	Ann Blyth, Edmund Gwenn, John McIntire	Comedy	Universal
The San Francisco Story	Robert Parrish	Yvonne De Carlo, Joel McCrea, Sidney Blackmer	Western	Warner Bros.
Saturday Island	Stuart Heisler	Linda Darnell, Tab Hunter, Donald Gray	Adventure, Romance, War	United Artists; Alternate title Island of Desire
The Savage	George Marshall	Charlton Heston, Susan Morrow, Peter Hansen	Western	Paramount
Scandal Sheet	Phil Karlson	Broderick Crawford, John Derek, Donna Reed	Crime drama	Columbia
Scaramouche	George Sidney	Stewart Granger, Eleanor Parker, Janet Leigh	Adventure	MGM
Scarlet Angel	Sidney Salkow	Yvonne de Carlo, Rock Hudson, Richard Denning	Adventure, Western	Universal
Sea Tiger	Frank McDonald	Marguerite Chapman, Mara Corday, John Archer	Drama	Monogram
The Sellout	Gerald Mayer	Walter Pidgeon, John Hodiak, Paula Raymond	Drama	MGM
Shadow in the Sky	Fred M. Wilcox	Ralph Meeker, Nancy Davis, Jean Hagen	Drama	MGM
She's Working Her Way Through College	H. Bruce Humberstone	Virginia Mayo, Ronald Reagan, Gene Nelson	Comedy	Warner Bros.
Singin' in the Rain	Gene Kelly, Stanley Donen	Gene Kelly, Debbie Reynolds, Donald O'Connor, Jean Hagen	Musical comedy	MGM; 2 Oscar nominations; Golden Globe for O'Connor
Skirts Ahoy!	Sidney Lanfield	Esther Williams, Joan Evans, Vivian Blaine	Comedy	MGM
Sky Full of Moon	Norman Foster	Carleton Carpenter, Jan Sterling, Keenan Wynn	Western	MGM
Smoky Canyon	Fred F. Sears	Charles Starrett, Jock Mahoney, Smiley Burnette	Western	Columbia
The Sniper	Edward Dmytryk	Adolphe Menjou, Arthur Franz, Marie Windsor	Film noir	Columbia
The Snows of Kilimanjaro	Henry King	Gregory Peck, Ava Gardner, Susan Hayward	Adventure	20th Century Fox; from Ernest Hemingway story
Somebody Loves Me	Irving Brecher	Betty Hutton, Ralph Meeker, Adele Jergens	Musical	Paramount
Something for the Birds	Robert Wise	Victor Mature, Patricia Neal, Edmund Gwenn	Comedy	20th Century Fox
Something to Live For	George Stevens	Joan Fontaine, Ray Milland, Teresa Wright	Drama	Paramount
Son of Ali Baba	Kurt Neumann	Tony Curtis, Piper Laurie, Susan Cabot	Adventure	Universal
Son of Paleface	Frank Tashlin	Bob Hope, Jane Russell, Roy Rogers	Western comedy	Paramount; sequel to Paleface
Sound Off	Richard Quine	Mickey Rooney, John Archer, Gordon Jones	Comedy	Columbia
South Pacific Trail	William Witney	Rex Allen, Estelita Rodriguez, Nestor Paiva	Western	Republic
Springfield Rifle	André de Toth	Gary Cooper, Phyllis Thaxter, Lon Chaney Jr.	Western	Warner Bros.
The Star	Stuart Heisler	Bette Davis, Sterling Hayden, Natalie Wood	Drama	20th Century Fox
Stars and Stripes Forever	Henry Koster	Clifton Webb, Robert Wagner, Debra Paget	Musical, biography	20th Century Fox; story of John Philip Sousa
The Steel Fist	Wesley Barry	Roddy McDowall, Kristine Miller, Harry Lauter	Drama	Monogram
Steel Town	George Sherman	John Lund, Ann Sheridan, Howard Duff	Drama	Universal
The Steel Trap	Andrew L. Stone	Joseph Cotten, Teresa Wright, Jonathan Hale	Film noir	20th Century Fox
The Stooge	Norman Taurog	Dean Martin, Jerry Lewis, Polly Bergen	Comedy	Paramount
Stop, You're Killing Me	Roy Del Ruth	Broderick Crawford, Claire Trevor, Virginia Gibson	Comedy	Warner Bros.
Storm Over Tibet	John Hoffman	Rex Reason, Diana Douglas, Myron Healey	War	Columbia
The Story of Robin Hood	Ken Annakin	Richard Todd, Peter Finch, Joan Rice	Adventure	Disney
The Story of Will Rogers	Michael Curtiz	Will Rogers Jr., Jane Wyman, Eve Miller	Biography	Warner Bros.
Strange Fascination	Hugo Haas	Cleo Moore, Mona Barrie, Mona Barrie	Film noir	Columbia
Sudden Fear	David Miller	Joan Crawford, Jack Palance, Gloria Grahame	Film noir	RKO
Talk About a Stranger	David Bradley	George Murphy, Nancy Davis, Lewis Stone	Film noir	MGM
Target	Stuart Gilmore	Tim Holt, Richard Martin, Lane Bradford	Western	RKO
Tarzan's Savage Fury	Cy Endfield	Lex Barker, Dorothy Hart, Patric Knowles	Adventure	RKO
Texas City	Lewis D. Collins	Johnny Mack Brown, Lois Hall, James Ellison	Western	Monogram
The Thief	Russell Rouse	Ray Milland, Martin Gabel, Rita Gam	Film noir	United Artists
Thief of Damascus	Will Jason	Paul Henreid, John Sutton, Jeff Donnell	Adventure	Columbia
This Woman is Dangerous	Felix E. Feist	Joan Crawford, Dennis Morgan, Mari Aldon	Drama	Warner Bros.
Three for Bedroom "C"	Milton H. Bren	Gloria Swanson, James Warren, Hans Conried	Comedy	Warner Bros.
Thunder in the East	Charles Vidor	Allan Ladd, Deborah Kerr, Charles Boyer	War drama	Paramount
Thunderbirds	John H. Auer	John Derek, John Drew Barrymore, Mona Freeman	War	Republic
Thundering Caravans	Harry Keller	Allan Lane, Mona Knox, Eddy Waller	Western	Republic
Torpedo Alley	Lew Landers	Mark Stevens, Dorothy Malone, Charles Winninger	War	Allied Artists
Toughest Man in Arizona	R. G. Springsteen	Vaughn Monroe, Joan Leslie, Edgar Buchanan	Western	Republic
Trail Guide	Lesley Selander	Tim Holt, Frank Wilcox, Linda Douglas	Western	RKO
The Treasure of Lost Canyon	Ted Tetzlaff	William Powell, Julie Adams, Rosemary DeCamp	Adventure	Universal
Tropical Heat Wave	R.G. Springsteen	Estelita Rodriguez, Robert Hutton, Grant Withers	Musical comedy	Republic
The Turning Point	William Dieterle	William Holden, Edmond O'Brien, Alexis Smith	Film noir	Paramount

== U-Z ==
Title	Director	Cast	Genre	Notes
Untamed Frontier	Hugo Fregonese	Joseph Cotten, Shelley Winters, Scott Brady	Western	Universal
Untamed Women	W. Merle Connell	Mikel Conrad, Doris Merrick, Midge Ware	Adventure	United Artists
Viva Zapata!	Elia Kazan	Marlon Brando, Jean Peters, Anthony Quinn	Historical	20th Century Fox; Oscar for Quinn, 5 nominations
Voodoo Tiger	Spencer G. Bennet	Johnny Weissmuller, Jean Byron, Rick Vallin	Adventure	Columbia
The WAC from Walla Walla	William Witney	Judy Canova, Stephen Dunne, June Vincent	Comedy	Republic
Waco	Lewis D. Collins	Bill Elliott, Pamela Blake, Rand Brooks	Western	Monogram
Wagon Team	George Archainbaud	Gene Autry, Gail Davis, Gordon Jones	Western	Columbia
Wagons West	Ford Beebe	Rod Cameron, Peggie Castle, Noah Beery Jr.	Western	Allied Artists
Wait till the Sun Shines, Nellie	Henry King	Jean Peters, David Wayne, Hugh Marlowe	Drama	20th Century Fox
Walk East on Beacon	Alfred L. Werker	Virginia Gilmore, George Murphy, Finlay Currie	Film Noir	Columbia
Washington Story	Robert Pirosh	Van Johnson, Patricia Neal, Louis Calhern	Drama	MGM
Way of a Gaucho	Jacques Tourneur	Gene Tierney, Rory Calhoun, Richard Boone	Western	20th Century Fox
We're Not Married!	Edmund Goulding	Ginger Rogers, Marilyn Monroe, Paul Douglas	Romantic comedy	20th Century Fox
What Price Glory?	John Ford	James Cagney, Dan Dailey, Corinne Calvet	War	20th Century Fox; remake of 1926 film
When in Rome	Clarence Brown	Van Johnson, Paul Douglas, Joseph Calleia	Comedy drama	MGM
Wild Horse Ambush	Fred C. Brannon	Michael Chapin, Eilene Janssen, James Bell	Western	Republic
The Wild North	Andrew Marton	Stewart Granger, Wendell Corey, Cyd Charisse	Western	MGM
Wild Stallion	Lewis D. Collins	Ben Johnson, Edgar Buchanan, Martha Hyer	Western	Monogram
The Winning Team	Lewis Seiler	Doris Day, Ronald Reagan, Frank Lovejoy	Sports biopic	Warner Bros.; story of Grover Cleveland Alexander
With a Song in My Heart	Walter Lang	Susan Hayward, Rory Calhoun, David Wayne	Biography	20th Century Fox; story of Jane Froman
Without Warning!	Arnold Laven	Adam Williams, Meg Randall, Edward Binns	Film noir	United Artists
Woman in the Dark	George Blair	Penny Edwards, Ross Elliott, Rick Vallin	Crime	Republic
Woman of the North Country	Joseph Kane	Ruth Hussey, Gale Storm, John Agar	Western	Republic
The World in His Arms	Raoul Walsh	Gregory Peck, Ann Blyth, Anthony Quinn	Adventure	Universal
Wyoming Roundup	Thomas Carr	Whip Wilson, Phyllis Coates, Tommy Farrell	Western	Monogram
A Yank in Indo-China	Wallace Grissell	John Archer, Douglas Dick, Jean Willes	War	Columbia
Yankee Buccaneer	Frederick de Cordova	Jeff Chandler, Scott Brady, Suzan Ball	Adventure	Universal
You for Me	Don Weis	Jane Greer, Peter Lawford, Gig Young	Romance	MGM
Young Man with Ideas	Mitchell Leisen	Glenn Ford, Ruth Roman, Nina Foch	Comedy	MGM
Yukon Gold	Frank McDonald	Kirby Grant, Martha Hyer, Philip Van Zandt	Western	Monogram

== Serials ==
Title	Director	Cast	Genre	Notes
King of the Congo	Spencer Bennet	Buster Crabbe	Serial	Columbia
Radar Men from the Moon	Fred C. Brannon	George D. Wallace, Aline Towne	Serial	Republic; 1st Commando Cody feature
Son of Geronimo	Spencer Gordon Bennet	Clayton Moore, Rodd Redwing	Western	Columbia
Zombies of the Stratosphere	Fred C. Brannon		Serial	Republic

== Shorts and documentaries ==
Title	Director	Cast	Genre	Notes
The Dog House	Hanna-Barbera	Tom and Jerry	Animated short	MGM
The Duck Doctor	Hanna-Barbera	Tom and Jerry	Animated short	MGM
The Fallbrook Story	Frank Capra	town's fight for water rights	Documentary	Short
Feed the Kitty	Chuck Jones		Animated short	Warner Bros.
Fit to Be Tied	Hanna-Barbera	Tom and Jerry	Animated short	MGM
Fool Coverage	Robert McKimson		Animated short	Warner Bros.
Hare Lift	Friz Freleng		Animated short	Warner Bros.
The Hasty Hare	Charles M. Jones	Bugs Bunny	Animated short	MGM
Hic-cup Pup	Hanna-Barbera		Animated short	MGM
Little Runaway	Hanna-Barbera	Tom and Jerry	Animated short	MGM
Madeline			Animated short	United Productions
Magical Maestro	Tex Avery		Animated short	MGM
Oily Hare	Robert McKimson	Bugs Bunny	Animated short	Warner Bros.
Operation: Rabbit	Charles M. Jones	Bugs Bunny	Animated short	Warner Bros.
The Pleasure Garden	James Broughton		Short	
Posse Cat	Hanna-Barbera	Tom and Jerry	Animated short	MGM
Push-Button Kitty	Hanna-Barbera	Tom and Jerry	Animated short	MGM
Rabbit Seasoning	Charles M. Jones	Bugs Bunny	Animated short	Warner Bros.
Smitten Kitten	Hanna-Barbera		Animated short	MGM
Susie the Little Blue Coupe	Clyde Geronimi		Animated short	Disney
This Is Cinerama	Merian C. Cooper	Lowell Thomas	Documentary	
Trance and Dance in Bali	Margaret Mead, Gregory Bateson		Documentary	
Trick or Treat		Donald Duck	Animated short	Disney
Triplet Trouble	Hanna-Barbera	Tom and Jerry	Animated short	MGM
Two Little Indians	Hanna-Barbera	Tom and Jerry	Animated short	MGM
The Two Mouseketeers	Hanna-Barbera	Tom and Jerry	Animated short	MGM
Water, Water Every Hare	Charles M. Jones	Bugs Bunny	Animated short	Warner Bros.

== See also ==
- 1952 in the United States
