= Massacre Mafia Style =

1974 American film by Duke Mitchell

- Directed by: Duke Mitchell
- Written by: Duke Mitchell
- Produced by: Duke Mitchell; Joseph R. Juliano; Spartan Films
- Starring: Duke Mitchell; Vic Caesar; Lorenzo Dodo; Peter Milo; Louis Zito; Cara Salerno; Jimmy Williams
- Cinematography: Ken Gibb
- Edited by: Tony Mora; Robert Florio
- Music by: Duke Mitchell
- Distributed by: Moonstone Entertainment; Grindhouse Releasing
- Release date: December 19, 1974
- Running time: 82 minutes
- Country: United States
- Language: English

Massacre Mafia Style (also known as The Executioner or Like Father, Like Son) is a 1974 independent film written, directed, produced by, and starring Italian-American crooner-actor Duke Mitchell. The tagline for the film was "You’re IN, or you’re IN THE WAY."

Massacre Mafia Style was written, produced, self-financed and directed by Duke Mitchell, and was accumulated from all of his real-life run-ins with similar characters and mob stories. Duke Mitchell was an actor and singer (providing the singing voice of Fred Flintstone in The Flintstones cartoons) and was once part of a comedy duo with partner Sammy Petrillo who together starred in the 1952 cult film Bela Lugosi Meets a Brooklyn Gorilla with Bela Lugosi of Dracula fame. The pair whose act, Mitchell & Petrillo, was imitative of Martin & Lewis (Dean Martin and Jerry Lewis), was sued by Lewis after the Lugosi film was released. Mitchell went on to become a well-known crooner and nightclub act in Los Angeles, Las Vegas and as such, was known as the “King” of Palm Springs and ran in some of the same circles as pal Frank Sinatra. His nightclub act revolved around his Sinatra-like crooning and rockabilly Italian-American songs. With such behind-the-scenes access, Mitchell often used several of the nightclubs that he sang in as locations for his films; such places as The Buggy Whip in Los Angeles.

Mitchell would use the money he made singing to fund his independent films. Several of Mitchell's projects never saw the light of day, including his next film Gone with the Pope which only existed as a work print when it was found in a garage by Grindhouse Releasing’s Bob Murawski and Sage Stallone. It was carefully restored and released theatrically in 2011 by Grindhouse Releasing, which has also restored and released Mitchell's Massacre Mafia Style on Blu-ray in 2015.

While not prosecuted for obscenity, the film was seized and confiscated in the UK under Section 3 of the Obscene Publications Act 1959 during the video nasty panic.

== Plot ==
Mimi Miceli (Duke Mitchell) is the son of an established Italian-American mafia family, headed by don Mimi nicknamed "The Padrone" (Lorenzo Dardado), who has been exiled for his crimes in the United States to Sicily. Mimi, having been affected by the death of his wife shortly after conceiving a son, seeks to make ends meet by intending to resume the family business in Los Angeles and get the "pimps and bookmakers".

Mimi heads to the Hollywood area in Los Angeles, where he seeks the help of his longtime friend and mafioso, Jolly Rizzo (Vic Caesar), who works as a bartender. Jolly accepts the help, and Mimi confides a plan to kidnap one of the West Coast Mafia bosses, Chucky Tripoli (Louis Zito) and hold him for ransom, much-needed cash flow to start Mimi's takeover. Chucky is kidnapped and Mimi sends proof (Tripoli's finger in a jewellery box) to Tripoli's son Marco and wife Fanny (played by Duke Mitchell's real-life wife, Jo Mitchell). The West Coast mafia and Marco Tripoli respond to Mimi's ransom. Mimi then visits Chucky's daughter's wedding, giving a toast in the name of Sicily and on behalf of his mafia family. Chucky tolerates Mimi and welcomes him to the West Coast mafia since Chucky previously served under the Padrone and is indebted to this experience. Mimi then starts a romantic relationship with Liz (Cara Salerno), a woman he met at the wedding party.

Now acquainted with the West Coast mafia, Mimi and Jolly witness tensions and weakening within the mafia, where one of the men refuses to let a woman accompany, Superspook (Jimmy Williams), a well-known pimp from a newer generation who runs a hustle with “40 women” in the prime real estate between Hollywood and Beverly Hills. Jolly tells Mimi that Superspook is more powerful and important than the "old bookmakers and pimps" Mimi initially planned to acquire, which Mimi initially dismisses by repeating the mantra, "Tonight we eat, tomorrow we shoot". Mimi's method of acquisition is murder. In Sicily, The Padrone is disappointed with Chucky's handling of the West Coast mafia and the fact that the Sons of Sicily Defense League does not represent most Sicilian people. The Padrone tells his associate, Bones (Fred Otash) to relay the assassination targets to Chucky to "shake up Zantelli".

Mimi and Jolly are having lunch in Los Angeles with Chucky and Cheech, who assigns them to carry out an order to assassinate. Mimi initially declines, stating that the Sicilians and Italians have been disgraced and are blamed too many times for the killings. Chucky informs Mimi that the target is Georgios "The Greek" Angelopolis, and Mimi and Jolly then relent. The Padrone finds out that Mimi took advantage of the weakening of the West Coast mafia and killed more than targets. Outraged by Mimi's overachieving murders, The Padrone sends Bones to Los Angeles to confront Mimi to get "legitimate business" and not contact Chucky, the Sons of Sicily Defense League and the West Coast mafia anymore.

Mimi and Jolly start a "legitimate business" as movie producers who produce pornographic movies. While filming, Jolly is unsatisfied that Mimi's plan has slowed down and wants to return to "important things". Mimi reassures this, saying that he will get the women from Superspook. At a restaurant with Superspook, Mimi demands Superspook to give the women to him for his movies. Superspook refuses, saying that police officers would detain his women if they saw his women in Mimi's movies. Jolly and Mimi threaten Superspook that he will be choked during bedtime, but Superspook does not seem affected by Mimi's older and brutish tactics. They resolved to crucify Superspook on Easter Sunday. Liz warns Mimi that Chucky and the West Coast mafia are setting him up. Mimi and Jolly kill lawyer Albert Lowenstein (one of the sequences was used for a theatrical trailer), Dominic Zantelli, and Marco Tripoli, infuriating Chucky, who sends his men to assassinate Jolly and Liz. In return, Mimi bombs the funeral of Marco Tripoli, killing Chucky and Fanny Tripoli.

Now having satisfied most of his goals and being at a loss for the death of his associates, Mimi returns to Sicily to reunite with his son and the Padrone for a family gathering. The Padrone wonders what will Mimi do next; Mimi believes there is nothing to do there in the "new world", and goes on a soliloquy on how the mafia is non-existent apart from him, Bones, and the Padrone, and why the newer generation is not afraid of his generation. The Padrone retorts to Mimi, saying that he knows the "young blood" because he has raised Mimi's son when Mimi was away. Describing Mimi's son as "well mannered" and "genteel", the Padrone does not believe Mimi's view and pleads with him to see Mimi's son. Later, at a family gathering, the Padrone and Mimi's son kill Mimi.

== Production ==
Massacre Mafia Style was filmed on location in Los Angeles. It was edited by Tony Mora and by Emmy-nominated editor Robert Florio (who would also go on to edit on Mitchell's next film Gone with the Pope). Mitchell was said to have been inspired by 1972's The Godfather directed by Francis Ford Coppola and makes a reference to the famous movie in his dialogue, without naming it specifically. During the 1970s, the poliziotteschi (crime-action) genre in Italy was exploding. However, there were very few American-made mafia films catching fire besides the namesake Godfather film. Mitchell was clearly influenced by Coppola's work (as well as Scorsese’s) and was moved to tell his version of what it’s like to be an Italian-American, using his own nightclub points-of-reference and his bird's-eye-view of those Italian-American businessmen and their “spaghetti” traditions.

Mitchell's next film, Gone with the Pope was originally shot the next year but was not originally completed when Mitchell died from lung cancer, and remained unfinished until 2009. The film negative and unfinished cut work print were discovered in Mitchell's parking garage several years after his death. It has been edited and restored by cult film distributor Grindhouse Releasing which has also re-released Massacre Mafia Style on Blu-ray and DVD.

== Release ==
The movie was released theatrically in 1978 by Moonstone Entertainment, but didn't begin quietly building a cult audience until released on VHS by Video Gems in the 1980s. It has since been rediscovered, restored and re-released by Grindhouse Releasing and with it, a cult status growing ever stronger. In 2015, Grindhouse Releasing released a digitally restored version of the film on Blu-ray for the first time. Nathanial Thompson of TCM (Turner Classic Movies) Underground called the film “mind-bending” adding that “with Duke Mitchell's cult following steadily building on what seems to be a daily basis, one can only wonder how far and wide the legacy of this entertainment jack of all trades will go.” Josh Hurtado of Twitchfilm commented that it's “the rare film that is BETTER than its trailer... a great forgotten gem.” The reviewers at the Las Vegas Sun noted that Massacre Mafia Style is “a virtual torrent of bloodshed” and that it “makes the GODFATHER movies look like Sunday school picnic outings!”

== See also ==
- List of American films of 1974
