= Deaths in December 1981 =

The following is a list of notable deaths in December 1981.

Entries for each day are listed alphabetically by surname. A typical entry lists information in the following sequence:

- Name, age, country of citizenship at birth, subsequent country of citizenship (if applicable), reason for notability, cause of death (if known), and reference.

== December 1981 ==
=== 1 ===
- Russ Manning, 52, American comic book artist, he created the series Magnus, Robot Fighter and illustrated such newspaper comic strips as Tarzan and Star Wars, cancer

=== 2 ===
- Wallace Harrison, 86, American modernist architect, he served as a designer and architectural adviser for Nelson Rockefeller, he participated with the architectural teams involved in the construction of Rockefeller Center in New York City, his architectural works include the Socony-Mobil Building (1956), the Fish Church (1958), and the Time-Life Building (1959)
- Duke Mitchell, 55, American actor, slapstick comedian, crooner and independent film director of 1970s gangster films, he teamed up with his fellow comedian Sammy Petrillo in a comedy act imitating Martin and Lewis, in part based on the physical resemblance of Mitchell and Petrillo to the original comedy duo, he was one of the lead stars of the jungle-themed comedy Bela Lugosi Meets a Brooklyn Gorilla (1952), lung cancer

=== 4 ===
- Jovette Bernier, 81, Canadian journalist and scriptwriter, from 1963 until 1965, she wrote scripts for the Quebec-based soap opera Rue de l'Anse

=== 5 ===
- Darien Angadi, 32, English singer and actor, he recorded Benjamin Britten's Noye's Fludde with the Wandsworth School Boys' Choir, he had roles in several television dramas, including I, Claudius and Blake's 7, suicide by hanging
- Charles Barton, 79, American actor and film director, he was the first winner of the Academy Award for Best Assistant Director in 1933, primarily known for directing popular comedy films, he directed 9 films for the comedy duo of Abbott and Costello, including their last film appearance as a duo, Dance with Me, Henry (1956), heart attack

=== 6 ===
- Harry Harlow, 76, American psychologist, he is primarily known for his maternal-separation, dependency needs, and social isolation experiments on rhesus monkeys, which manifested the importance of caregiving and companionship to social and cognitive development. The importance of these findings is that they contradicted both the traditional pedagogic advice of limiting or avoiding bodily contact in an attempt to avoid spoiling children, and the insistence of the predominant behaviorist school of psychology that emotions were negligible.

=== 7 ===
- Noel Drayton, 68, South African-born American actor

=== 8 ===
- Big Walter Horton, 60, American blues harmonica player, he was regarded as one of the three great harmonica soloists of the genre, his technique and tone continue to be studied and emulated by harmonica players around the world, he accompanied John Lee Hooker in the film The Blues Brothers (1980), but he found the cinematic process to be tedious and abandoned the set, death by heart failure , with acute alcoholism as a contributing factor
- Ferruccio Parri, 91, Italian partisan and anti-fascist politician, he served as the prime minister of Italy for a few months in 1945, since Parri was a centrist, he was chosen as the compromise leader in a coalition government, in 1958, he initiated a failed proposal to form a parliamentary inquiry committee to investigate the activities of the Sicilian Mafia.
- Rocky Shahan, 62, American actor and stuntman, he was a regular cast member in the Western television series Rawhide

=== 11 ===
- Zoya Fyodorova, 73, Russian actress, sentenced for a number of years to work camp imprisonment in Siberia due to her affair with the American Navy captain Jackson Tate, and due to rejecting the advances of her would-be lover Lavrentiy Beria, the then-head of the NKVD, murdered in her own apartment, shot in the back of the head

=== 13 ===
- Cornelius Cardew, 45, English composer of experimental music, co-founder of the Scratch Orchestra, killed in a hit-and-run accident, attributed to a drunken driver who drove off to avoid arrest. Since Cardew was a prominent Marxist-Leninist activist, his death has also been described as a probable part of MI5's policy of assassinations.
- Pigmeat Markham, 77, American comedian, actor, singer, and dancer, his 1968 single "Here Comes the Judge" is often considered to be the earliest hip hop record, he reportedly appeared at New York's famed Apollo Theater more often than any other performer, he played his signature Judge character as a regular cast member of Rowan & Martin's Laugh-In during the 1968–69 television season, stroke
- Anne-Lise Tangstad, 46, Norwegian actress, she provided the voice of Maid Marian in the Norwegian-language version of the animated film Robin Hood (1973)

=== 14 ===
- Nathaniel Benchley, 66, American novelist, biographer, and children's writer, he previously served for a few years in the United States Navy, and he was a veteran of the Battle of the Atlantic (1939-1945)
- Marian Shockley, 73, American actress, she was selected as a WAMPAS Baby Star in 1932, she was the first person to play Nikki Porter, Ellery Queen's secretary, in the radio show The Adventures of Ellery Queen, filling that role from 1939 to 1944

=== 15 ===
- Catherine T. MacArthur, 73, American philanthropist, she was a co-founder of the MacArthur Foundation and a director of Bankers Life and Casualty, cancer
- Mikhail Zharov, 82, Russian actor and director, he was named a People's Artist of the USSR (1949) and a Hero of Socialist Labour (1974)

=== 17 ===
- Franz Dahlem, 89, German communist politician, leading official of the Socialist Unity Party (SED).
- Mehmet Shehu, 68, Albanian communist politician, Prime Minister of Albania from 1954 until 1981.

=== 23 ===
- Reg Ansett, 72, Australian businessman and aviator, eponymous founder of the Ansett Transport Industries, death after several months of poor health and a period of hospitalization
- Luther H. Evans, 79, American political scientist , he served as the Librarian of Congress from 1944 until 1953, and as the Director-General of UNESCO from 1953 until 1958, during the era of McCarthyism, he voluntarily instituted the Federal Loyalty Program at the Library of Congress, creating a loyalty board to examine current and potential employees regarding communism and homosexuality. Evans' program resulted in numerous employees being fired or resigning for their political or sexual orientation

=== 24 ===
- James Murdock, 50, American actor, he portrayed the assistant cook Mushy in the Western television series Rawhide lung cancer

=== 26 ===
- Savitri, 47, Indian actress and filmmaker, she was among the highest-paid professionals in the South Indian cinema during the 1950s and 1960s, and she was regarded as the "Queen of Telugu cinema", death attributed to complications from diabetes and high blood pressure, she had been comatose for 19 months at the time of her death
- Suat Hayri Ürgüplü, 78, Turkish politician, he briefly served as the prime minister of Turkey in 1965, heading a caretaker government, he was the last prime minister to have been born outside the territory of present-day Turkey, as his birthplace was Damascus

=== 27 ===
- Hoagy Carmichael, 82, American composer, songwriter, actor, and lawyer, he is considered to be one of the most successful representatives of the Tin Pan Alley group of songwriters of the 1930s, he was among the first singer-songwriters in the age of mass media to exploit new communication technologies, such as television and the use of electronic microphones and sound recordings,heart attack
- Mollie King, 86, American actress, she began working professionally on stage at the age of 7, and she was appearing at the Winter Garden Theatre and at other Broadway venues by age 16, stroke
- Natalia Pavlovna Paley, 76, Russian aristocrat and non-dynastic member of the Romanov family, she was a daughter of Grand Duke Paul Alexandrovich of Russia from a morganatic marriage, she was a favorite model for the great photographers of her time during the 1920s, she worked as a film actress in the 1930s, having a small role in George Cukor's Sylvia Scarlett (1935), starting in the 1940s, she worked for many years in the public relations department of the fashion house Mainbocher, death caused by an accidental fall in her bathroom and a fracture of the femoral neck

=== 29 ===
- Harry "A" Chesler, 83-84, Lithuanian-born American entrepreneur, he established the first comic book packager of the late-1930s to 1940s Golden Age of Comic Books, supplying comics features and complete comic books to publishers, his studio reportedly "[p]roduced the early issues of MLJ Publications Zip Comics, Pep Comics and Top-Notch Comics, Captain Marvel, Master Comics," as well as features for Centaur Comics, in 1976, Chesler donated over 4,000 pieces of original comic book and comic strip art, much of it dating from the turn of the 20th century, to Fairleigh Dickinson University's Friendship Library
- Miroslav Krleža, 88, Croatian writer, regarded as the greatest Croatian writer of the 20th century, his works often include the themes of bourgeois hypocrisy and conformism in Austria-Hungary and the Kingdom of Yugoslavia, death at home, after a number of years in "ill health"

=== 30 ===
- Alfie Anido, 22, Filipino actor, model, and matinee idol, he was a co-star in the camp classic Temptation Island (1980), suicide by gunshot. The official narrative on his death has been disputed, with conspiracy theories suggesting that it was a covered-up murder. The stories placed the blame for the cover-up on the father of Anido's ex-girlfriend, the Minister of Defense Juan Ponce Enrile, a major figure in the regime of the then-President Ferdinand Marcos

=== 31 ===
- Yefim Dzigan, 83, Soviet actor, film director and screenwriter, named a People's Artist of the USSR (1969)

== Sources ==
- Blum, Deborah (October 2, 2002). Love at Goon Park: Harry Harlow and the Science of Affection. Basic Books. ISBN 0-7382-0278-9.
- Coudert, Thierry. Cafe Society: Socialites, Patrons, and Artists 1920-1960. Flammarion, 2010. ISBN 2080301578
- Eagle, Bob; LeBlanc, Eric S. (2013). Blues: A Regional Experience. Santa Barbara, California: Praeger.
- Elsie, Robert (2010). Historical Dictionary of Albania. Scarecrow Press. ISBN 978-0-8108-7380-3. Archived from the original on October 3, 2023.
- Harris, Tony. The legacy of Cornelius Cardew. Abingdon, Ashgate 2013. ISBN 978-1-4094-4810-5.
- Kennedy, Rick (1994b). Jelly Roll, Bix, and Hoagy: Gennett Studios and the Birth of Recorded Jazz. Bloomington, IN: Indiana University Press. ISBN 978-0-253-33136-6.
- Manning, Russ (2017). Mullaney, Dean (ed.). Star Wars: The Complete Classic Newspaper Comics, Vol. 1. Handley, Rich (intro); Franke III, Henry G. (intro). San Diego: IDW Publishing. ISBN 978-1-63140-872-4. OCLC 986785580.
- Taylor, Timothy D. "Moving in Decency: The Music and Radical Politics of Cornelius Cardew" Music & Letters 79, no.4 (November 1998): 555–76.
- Tilbury, John. Cornelius Cardew: A Life Unfinished. Harlow: Copula, an imprint of Matchless Recordings and Publishing, 2008. ISBN 978-0-9525492-3-9 (cloth), ISBN 978-0-9525492-4-6 (pbk)
- Vassiliev, Alexandre. Beauty in Exile: The Artists, Models, and Nobility who Fled the Russian Revolution and Influenced the World of Fashion. Harry N. Abrams, 2001. ISBN 0-8109-5701-9
