= Gone with the Pope =

- Directed by: Duke Mitchell
- Written by: Duke Mitchell
- Produced by: Duke Mitchell; Bob Murawski (executive); Sage Stallone (executive); Chris Innis (associate)
- Starring: Duke Mitchell; Peter Milo; Jim LoBianco; Giorgio Tavolieri
- Cinematography: Peter Santoro
- Edited by: Bob Murawski (restoration cut); Robert Leighton; Robert Florio
- Music by: Duke Mitchell; Jeffrey Mitchell
- Distributed by: Grindhouse Releasing (USA)
- Release date: March 12, 2010 (limited theatrical)
- Country: United States
- Language: English

Gone with the Pope (also known as Kiss the Ring) is a 1976 independent film written, directed and produced by Italian-American crooner-actor Duke Mitchell. It was first released in 2010 by Grindhouse Releasing.

== Plot ==
The movie tells the story of four ex-convicts who journey to Rome to attempt to kidnap the Pope, planning to charge a ransom of "25 cents from every Catholic in the world."

== Production ==
Gone with the Pope was shot on location in Los Angeles and Palm Springs, California, as well as in Las Vegas, Nevada, and Rome, Italy. The re-recording was done by Marti D. Humphrey, C.A.S., at The Dub Stage in Burbank, California. Digital restoration was completed at Fotokem Film and Video.

Duke Mitchell stars as the ring leader "Paul," with Peter Milo as "Peter" and also starring Jim LoBianco and Giorgio Tavolieri. The cinematography is by Peter Santoro, with original editing by Oscar-nominated Bob Leighton (Rob Reiner's film editor) and Emmy-nominated editor Robert Florio. The re-release version was edited by Bob Murawski, Paul Hart and Jody Fedele, and features the music of Frankie Carr & the Novelites. Mitchell was known for his starring role in the film Bela Lugosi Meets a Brooklyn Gorilla and for directing the cult film, The Executioner. Gone with the Pope was originally shot in 1976, but remained unfinished until 2009. The film negative and unfinished cut work print were discovered in Mitchell's parking garage several years after his death. It has been edited and restored by cult film distributor Grindhouse Releasing. Mitchell was said to have been inspired by Francis Ford Coppola's The Godfather.

== Release ==
The American Cinematheque in Hollywood premiered the film on March 12, 2010, at the Egyptian Theatre. The film was then screened at domestic and international film festivals in the United States and Australia. It was subsequently released on home video on March 24, 2015, as a Blu-ray/DVD combo.
