= An American Hippie in Israel =

- DVD cover
- Ha-Trempist
- Directed by: Amos Sefer
- Written by: Amos Sefer; H.B. Wertheim (English dialogue)
- Produced by: Amatsia Hiuni
- Starring: Asher Tzarfati; Lily Avidan; Shmuel Wolf; Tzila Karne
- Cinematography: Ya'ackov Kallach
- Edited by: Amos Sefer
- Music by: Nachum Heiman
- Distributed by: Grindhouse Releasing; Box Office Spectaculars
- Release date: 1972 (Limited theatrical)
- Running time: 95 minutes
- Country: Israel
- Language: English

An American Hippie in Israel, also known as Trey (from Hebrew הטרמפיסט, "The Hitch-hiker"), is a 1972 Israeli metaphorical counter-culture film written and directed by Amos Sefer, and starring Asher Tzarfati.

Many have cited this film as one of the worst films ever made. Once thought lost, it was rediscovered decades later by the cult film enthusiasts at Grindhouse Releasing who have digitally restored the film and presented it in Blu-ray and DVD.

== Plot ==
Young American hippie and war veteran, Mike, travels to Israel shortly after his involvement in Vietnam. Hitchhiking and "bumming around," hippie Mike meets up with three Israelis along his journey: stage actress Elizabeth, another female hippie friend, and her Hebrew-speaking boyfriend Komo. They join a larger group of hippies and decide to form an isolated community on a deserted island, where they can live in peace "without clothes, without government, and without borders."

The hippies are not without their problems and find them in two gun-toting, top hat-clad, mime-like enforcers (who regularly appear out of nowhere) and who are out to make Mike's life miserable. Reviewer Brian Orndorf notes; "Sefer doesn't explain who these guys are or what they're ultimately after, hinting that the duo might be the personification of "the Man" out to silence the hippie uproar."

Led by American Mike, the quartet of hippies manages to survive a gun attack by the mad mimes and the group flees to the uninhabited island. On the road trip to the island, the hippies quickly forget their worries, tossing their clothes in the wind and enjoying the ride in Elizabeth’s chic convertible car. As they drive down the Israeli coast, they stop along the way to make love and to pick up the supplies they will need on their island - including the purchase of groceries and a live lamb.

They finally arrive at their intended destination and park their car on shore, using a small dinghy boat to row their way out to the island. Upon reaching the tiny isolated land mass, the elated hippies do a free-form dance, skinny dip and, when dusk hits, settle in for some canned food by the fireside. That night, the hippies pronounce their love for freedom and for each other as well as proclaiming how "full of shit" the world is. They wake up the following morning, however, to discover that both their boat and lamb have mysteriously vanished overnight.

Although Mike makes a valiant effort, shark-infested waters make it impossible to swim back to the mainland where the car sits on the shore. As the women get hungry and tempers begin to flare, the men forage for food, winding up with little more than a handful of barnacles that Mike managed to scrub off some rocks. The discovery of the still very much alive lamb leads to the final apocalyptic scene. The idyllic situation quickly descends into paradise lost as the dark true nature of unregenerate man, hippie rhetoric notwithstanding, is laid bare.

== Cast ==
- Asher Tzarfati as Mike
- Lily Avidan as Elizabeth
- Shmuel Wolf as Komo
- Tzila Karney as Françoise

== Development and production ==
An American Hippie in Israel was written and directed by Amos Sefer, with principal photography's starting around 1971. It was director Sefer's second film.

== Release ==
An American Hippie in Israel had its original limited theatrical release in 1972, but initially failed to find a distributor willing to take on the film. Four decades later, it was rediscovered by film editor-distributor Bob Murawski of cult film distribution company Grindhouse Releasing. Grindhouse Releasing posted a trailer for the film on YouTube that Murawski had edited, which was then picked up and seen by cult fans all over the world, including in Israel, the country of origin. Suddenly the film was receiving renewed attention and quickly became a hot ticket on the Tel Aviv midnight movie circuit, where it became so popular that it is now screened monthly. In Tel Aviv, led on by uber-fan Yaniv Edelstein, the film's enthusiasts have acted out scenes from the film and talked back to the screen, interacting with the film much in the same way as fans do with the American midnight staple The Rocky Horror Picture Show. Hippie was released for the first time on Blu-ray and DVD on September 10, 2013, by Grindhouse Releasing. The film had screened theatrically in the United States and at the Grindhouse Film Festival on August 27, 2013.

== Reception ==
An American Hippie in Israel has been called a “cinematic oddity” with a “creepy sincerity”. Gil Shefler of The Jewish Daily Forward described the film as "perfectly awful", offering that it "[p]robably [is] the worst Israeli movie ever made, and a serious candidate for the worst movie of all time, which, surprisingly, is enjoying an unexpected revival 38 years after it was made." Alexandra Oliver of Partisan Magazine agreed, titling her review, "Is This the Worst Israeli Film Ever Made?" Reviewer Brian Orndorf of Blu-ray.com remarked, “for all the nonsense and pull-your-hair-out padding that's included in the feature, Sefer has a weird vision for "Hippie" that almost works if one squints hard enough, attempting to make an anti-war picture that's soaked in oddity and nudity. It's an admirable effort, with periods of floppy B-movie shenanigans that are surprisingly entertaining. Orndorf gave Grindhouse Releasing's Blu-ray release a rating of 4 stars out of 5, and 4-1/2 stars alone for the generous bonus materials on the release, commenting that “As a punchline, An American Hippie in Israel is easily digestible and consistently amusing—a perfect addition to any cult movie collection.”

== See also ==
- List of cult films
- List of films related to the hippie subculture
- List of 20th century films considered the worst
