= Chris Innis =

American film editor

- Born: Christina Jean Innis; San Diego, California, U.S.
- Other name: Chris Innis
- Occupation: Film editor
- Spouse: Bob Murawski (2008–present)

Christina Jean "Chris" Innis is an American film editor. She was awarded the 2010 Academy Award, BAFTA, and ACE awards for "Best Film Editing" on the film The Hurt Locker shared with co-editor, Bob Murawski. She is an elected member of the American Cinema Editors (ACE) and has served as an associate director on the board.

== Early life ==
Innis was born and raised in San Diego, California, the daughter of architect Donald Innis and his wife, teacher and floral designer Virginia.

Chris Innis moved to the San Francisco Bay Area where she graduated from U.C. Berkeley, majoring in film studies. While a student at Cal Berkeley, Innis interned for several San Francisco production companies, including the commercial company owned and operated by cinematographer Ron Eveslage.

== Career highlights ==
Innis completed post-graduate film studies at The California Institute of the Arts and received a MFA degree in filmmaking. During this time, Innis edited music videos featuring rappers Ice Cube, Onyx and DMX, as well as edited the first music video for the band Fine Industrial is Dead directed by Jordan Scott (daughter of notable film director Ridley Scott). Innis also directed and/or produced almost two dozen karaoke videos of hits for Japanese firm Pioneer Electronics.

After a move to Hollywood, Innis worked as the production coordinator on the first season of the long-running hit television series American's Funniest Home Videos. She later worked her way up in post-production alongside film editor, Pietro Scalia, who she assisted on the Academy Award-winning Oliver Stone film JFK. Innis and Scalia worked for six years together on a variety of films including Ridley Scott's G.I. Jane, Sam Raimi's The Quick and the Dead, White Man's Burden starring John Travolta, and Sam Raimi's cult horror TV pilot American Gothic.

Innis progressed as a music editor and film editor for Sam Raimi (film director best known for The Evil Dead and the successful original Spider-Man films). Innis was hired by Raimi for the job of lead editor on the CBS/Universal TV horror series American Gothic. Innis has since edited several films including 2010's Best Picture winner The Hurt Locker, which won six Academy Awards including best editing.

Innis has worked as a producer, writer, and editor with Bob Murawski for the distribution of cult films for Grindhouse Releasing and Box Office Spectaculars. She has also worked on the digital restorations of The Big Gundown and The Swimmer. She wrote, produced, directed and edited a 2 1/2-hour, five-part documentary The Story of the Swimmer featuring behind-the-scenes interviews with cast and crew of the 1968 film The Swimmer including Joan Rivers, Janet Landgard, Marge Champion, Burt Lancaster's daughter Joanna Lancaster, producer Michael Hertzberg and former film executive Ted Zachary (New Line Cinema). The documentary has been called "miraculous... never a dull moment", "a fascinating Hollywood story" which is "impressive...and should be in the running for Best (Blu-ray) Feature of the year".

Chris Innis appears in the documentary 78/52 directed by Alexandre O. Philippe, a post-modern breakdown of the iconic shower scene in Alfred Hitchcock's Psycho.

== Personal life ==
Since 2008, Innis has been married to fellow film editor and film distributor Bob Murawski. The two were first introduced to one another by Sam Raimi and met while both were editing American Gothic. The couple married shortly after completing work on The Hurt Locker. Her sister is Bay Area artist Cynthia Ona Innis.

== Selected filmography ==
Title	Position	Other Personnel	Notes
JFK	Apprentice Editor	Director Oliver Stone	Team received Academy Award/BAFTA/ACE "Best Editing"
Indecent Proposal	Apprentice Editor	Director Adrian Lyne	
Dead Beat	First Assistant Editor		
The Quick and the Dead	First Assistant Editor	Director Sam Raimi	
American Gothic	TV Pilot Associate Editor	Executive Producer Sam Raimi	
American Gothic	TV series Editor	Executive Producer Sam Raimi	
G.I. Jane	Associate Editor	Director Ridley Scott	
The Boy with the X-Ray Eyes (aka X-Treme Teens)	Editor	Director Jeff Burr	
The Gift	Music Editor	Director Sam Raimi	
Spider-Man	Music Editor	Director Sam Raimi	
Straight Into Darkness	Consulting Editor	Director Jeff Burr	
The Hurt Locker	Editor (with Bob Murawski)	Director Kathryn Bigelow	Academy Award/BAFTA/ACE "Best Editing," "Best Picture"
Gone with the Pope	Associate Producer		
The Big Gundown	Producer (Blu-ray/DVD restoration/release)		
The Swimmer	Producer (Blu-ray/DVD restoration/release)		
The Story of the Swimmer (feature documentary)	Writer/Director/Producer/Editor		2 1/2-hour, five-part documentary on the making of The Swimmer
It Must be Nice	Editor/Director/Producer		Short film

== Awards and nominations ==
- The Swimmer – (Won) – The 2014 International Press Academy's Satellite Award
  – Outstanding Overall Blu-ray/DVD (producer /Grindhouse Releasing)
- The Hurt Locker – (Won) – 2010 Academy Award – Best Film Editing
- The Hurt Locker – (Won) – 2010 BAFTA – Best Film Editing
- The Hurt Locker – (Won) – 2010 ACE Eddie Award – Best Film Editing
- The Hurt Locker – (Won) – The Online Film Critics Society – Best Film Editing
- The Hurt Locker – (Won) – The Las Vegas Film Critics Association – Best Film Editing
- The Hurt Locker – (Won) – Boston Society of Film Critics – Best Film Editing
- The Hurt Locker – (Won) – The International Press Academy's Golden Satellite Award – Best Film Editing
- The Hurt Locker – (Won) – International Cinephile Society Award – Best Editing
- The Hurt Locker – (Nominated) – The Broadcast Film Critics Association Critic's Choice Awards – Best Film Editing
- The Hurt Locker – (Nominated) – Hollywood Post Alliance Awards Outstanding Editing – Feature Film

== See also ==
- List of Academy Award winning couples
