= Bob Murawski =

American film editor (born 1964)

- Born: Robert Lee Murawski; June 14, 1964 (age 62); Bad Axe, Michigan, U.S.
- Other name: Dutch Murawski
- Education: Michigan State University
- Occupations: Film editor, distributor
- Spouse: Christina "Chris" Innis (2008–present)

Robert Lee Murawski (born June 14, 1964) is an American film editor and distributor. He is best known for his work with director Sam Raimi. He won the Academy Award for Best Film Editing for his work on The Hurt Locker (2008), which he shared with his wife, fellow editor Chris Innis. He is also the co-founder of Grindhouse Releasing, a film distribution company specializing in re-releases of cult films.

== Early life and education ==
Murawski was born in Bad Axe, Michigan, and grew up in the thumb of the state. He was the valedictorian at his high school, and graduated from Michigan State University with a major in Telecommunications.

== Film editing ==
Soon after graduation, he interned with Detroit-based film sub-distributor, Bob Mason of Mason Releasing. Murawski then moved to Hollywood, where he worked as an assistant editor on several films, including Raimi's comic-book-inspired picture Darkman.

Murawski has largely worked as a film editor, primarily for director/producer Sam Raimi, on films including Army of Darkness, The Gift, Drag Me to Hell and the Spider-Man series of films. He also co-edited the Academy Award winning film, The Hurt Locker with editor Chris Innis. Raimi has said of working with Murawski

He’d come (down to the set) to see how things were going and to let me know if he’d just cut something that wasn’t working the way he’d wanted it to, or to suggest a pick-up shot I should get for a piece he felt we needed in a sequence I hadn’t realized I needed. He’s very detail-oriented... So we’re very close collaborators.

Raimi finds editing with Murawski to be "relaxing", adding

I love it... I can watch the film come together, so it’s a time of discovery for me as Bob and I fit all the pieces together.

Murawski has also cut music videos for such groups as The Ramones, Motörhead, and Sublime. Bob Murawski appears in the documentary 78/52, directed by Alexandre O. Philippe, a post-modern breakdown of the iconic shower scene in Alfred Hitchcock's Psycho. He is represented by International Creative Management (ICM).

== Film distribution ==
In 1995, born out of a mutual love for rare and unseen cult films, Bob Murawski and actor/director Sage Stallone (the son of Sylvester Stallone) formed Grindhouse Releasing. Murawski continues to run Grindhouse and partner Box Office Spectaculars, both companies that restore, preserve, and distribute classic cult and Euro-horror films. The two labels have digitally remastered classic cult films such as The Swimmer starring Burt Lancaster, The Big Gundown starring Lee Van Cleef and Tomas Milian, Lucio Fulci's spaghetti-horror masterpiece, E tu vivrai nel terrore (a.k.a. The Beyond) as well as Italian cannibal films Make Them Die Slowly (a.k.a. Cannibal Ferox), Cannibal Holocaust, American cult film I Drink Your Blood (1970) (directed by David E. Durston), and director Juan Piquer Simón's cult horror film, Pieces. The company is currently presenting the release of An American Hippie in Israel (on Blu-ray/DVD) and Duke Mitchell's previously unreleased independent feature, Gone with the Pope (screening theatrically). Box Office Spectaculars and Grindhouse has also handled the theatrical re-release and negative restoration of director Sam Raimi's cult horror film, The Evil Dead as well as helming the digital restorations (in association with Columbia Pictures/Sony) of the rare spaghetti western The Big Gundown and The Swimmer directed by Frank Perry.

== Personal life ==
Murawski is married to film editor Christina "Chris" Innis. The two editors met while working together on the Universal/CBS television series American Gothic and married in 2008. The pair has worked together on the Academy Award winning film The Hurt Locker, and on several Sam Raimi productions such as The Gift, and Spider-Man, as well as collaborating on Grindhouse Releasing/Box Office Spectaculars releases.

== Filmography ==
Year	Title	Director	Notes
1990	Danger Zone III: Steel Horse War	Douglas Bronco	
1991	Carnal Crimes	Gregory Dark	
1992	Army of Darkness	Sam Raimi	with Raimi
1993	Hard Target	John Woo	
1993	Freaked	Alex Winter; Tom Stern	Additional editor
1994	Object of Obsession	Gregory Dark	
1994	Animal Instincts II	Gregory Dark	
1995	The Expert	Rick Avery William Lustig	
1995	Night of the Scarecrow	Jeff Burr	
1996	Uncle Sam	William Lustig	
1997	Last Lives	Worth Keeter	
1999	From Dusk Till Dawn 2: Texas Blood Money	Scott Spiegel	
2000	The Gift	Sam Raimi	with Arthur Coburn
2002	Spider-Man	Sam Raimi	with Arthur Coburn
2004	Spider-Man 2	Sam Raimi	
2007	Spider-Man 3	Sam Raimi	
2008	The Hurt Locker	Kathryn Bigelow	with Chris Innis
2009	Drag Me to Hell	Sam Raimi	
2010	Gone with the Pope	Duke Mitchell	Filmed in 1976
2011	The Resident	Antti Jokinen	with Stuart Levy
2011	Priest	Scott Stewart	Additional editor
2012	ParaNorman	Sam Fell; Chris Butler	Consulting editor
2013	Oz the Great and Powerful	Sam Raimi	
2014	Dracula Untold	Gary Shore	Additional editor
2015	Poltergeist	Gil Kenan	
2016	Ben-Hur	Timur Bekmambetov	Additional editor
2017	Kong: Skull Island	Jordan Vogt-Roberts	Additional editor
2018	The Other Side of the Wind	Orson Welles	Filmed between 1970-76
2019	Godzilla: King of the Monsters	Michael Dougherty	Pre-production editor
2019	Lake of Death	Nini Bull Robsahm	
2019	Child's Play	Lars Klevberg	Additional editor
2020	Mosquito State	Filip Jan Rymsza	
2020	Hopper/Welles	Orson Welles	Filmed in 1970
2022	Doctor Strange in the Multiverse of Madness	Sam Raimi	with Tia Nolan
2024	The First Omen	Arkasha Stevenson	with Amy E. Duddleston
2026	Send Help	Sam Raimi	

== Distributed films ==
- Cannibal Ferox (a.k.a. Make them Die Slowly) - (Grindhouse Releasing) - released LD: 1997; VHS: 1999: DVD: July 2000, Blu-ray: 2015
- Cat in the Brain (a.k.a. Nightmare Concert, Un gatto nel cervello) - (Box Office Spectaculars) - released LD: 1998, DVD: 2009
- The Beyond (a.k.a. Seven Doors of Death, E tu vivrai nel terrore! L'aldilà) - (Grindhouse Releasing) - released DVD: October 2000, re-released 2008, Blu-ray: 2015
- I Drink Your Blood (a.k.a. Hydro-Phobia) - (Box Office Spectaculars) - released DVD: 2002; re-released 2006
- Cannibal Holocaust - (Grindhouse Releasing) - released DVD: 2005, re-released 2008, Blu-ray: 2014
- Pieces (a.k.a. Mil gritos tiene la noche) - (Box Office Spectaculars) - released DVD: October 2008
- Gone with the Pope (a.k.a. Kiss the Ring) - (Box Office Spectaculars / Grindhouse Releasing) - released 2010 (theatrical), 2015 (Blu-ray/DVD combo)
- An American Hippie in Israel (a.k.a. Ha-Trempist, The Hitch Hiker) - (Box Office Spectaculars / Grindhouse Releasing) (Blu-ray/DVD release, 2013)
- Corruption - (Box Office Spectaculars / Sony Pictures) (Restoration, Blu-ray/DVD release, 2013)
- The Big Gundown (a.k.a. La resa dei conti) - (Box Office Spectaculars / Sony Pictures) (Restoration, Blu-ray/DVD release, 2013)
- The Swimmer - (Box Office Spectaculars / Sony Pictures) (Restoration, Blu-ray/DVD release, 2014)
- Massacre Mafia Style - (Box Office Spectaculars) Blu-ray/DVD release 2015

== Awards and nominations ==
- The Swimmer - (Won) - The 2014 International Press Academy's Satellite Award
  - Outstanding Overall Blu-ray/DVD (producer /Grindhouse Releasing)
- The Hurt Locker - (Won) - 2010 Academy of Motion Picture Arts and Sciences ("Oscar")
  Best Film Editing(shared with co-editor Chris Innis)
- The Hurt Locker - (Won) - 2010 BAFTA - Best Film Editing
  (shared with co-editor Chris Innis)
- The Hurt Locker - (Won) - 2010 ACE Eddie Award - Best Feature Film Editing (Dramatic)
  (shared with co-editor Chris Innis)
- The Hurt Locker - (Won) - The International Press Academy's Golden Satellite Award -
  Best Film Editing - (shared with co-editor Chris Innis)
- The Hurt Locker - (Won) - The Online Film Critics Association - Best Film Editing
  (shared with co-editor Chris Innis)
- The Hurt Locker - (Won) - Boston Society of Film Critics - Best Film Editing
  (shared with co-editor Chris Innis)
- The Hurt Locker - (Won) - The Las Vegas Film Critics Association - Best Film Editing
  (shared with co-editor Chris Innis)
- The Hurt Locker - (Won) - International Cinephile Society award - Best Editing
  (shared with co-editor Chris Innis)
- The Hurt Locker - (Nominated) - The Broadcast Film Critics Association
  Critic's Choice Awards - Best Film Editing (shared with co-editor Chris Innis)
- The Hurt Locker - (Nominated) - Hollywood Post Alliance Awards
  Outstanding Editing - Feature Film (shared with co-editor Chris Innis)
- Spider-Man 2 (Nominated) - 2004 Golden Satellite Awards, Satellite Award for Best Editing
- Spider-Man 2 - American Film Institute Awards 2004, official selection for AFI top ten movies of the year.
- The Other Side of the Wind - National Board of Review ― William K. Everson Award for Film History (shared with producers)
- The Other Side of the Wind - National Society of Film Critics ― Film Heritage Award (shared with producers)
- The Other Side of the Wind - (Won) - National Association of Film Critics ― Best editing award (shared with Orson Welles)
- The Other Side of the Wind - (Won) - San Francisco Film Critics Circle ― Best editing award (shared with Welles)
- The Other Side of the Wind - (Won) - Los Angeles Film Critics Association ― Special citation (shared with producers)
- The Other Side of the Wind - (Runner-up) - Boston Society of Film Critics ― Best editing award (with Welles)
- The Other Side of the Wind - (Runner-up) - International Cinephile Society ― Best editing award (with Welles)
- The Other Side of the Wind - (Nominated) - Chicago Film Critics Association ― Best editing award (with Welles)
- First recipient of the Campari Passion for Film Award (2018), 75th Venice International Film Festival.

== See also ==
- List of Academy Award winning couples
