= Shmuel Wolf =

Israeli actor (1934–2019)

- שמואל וולף
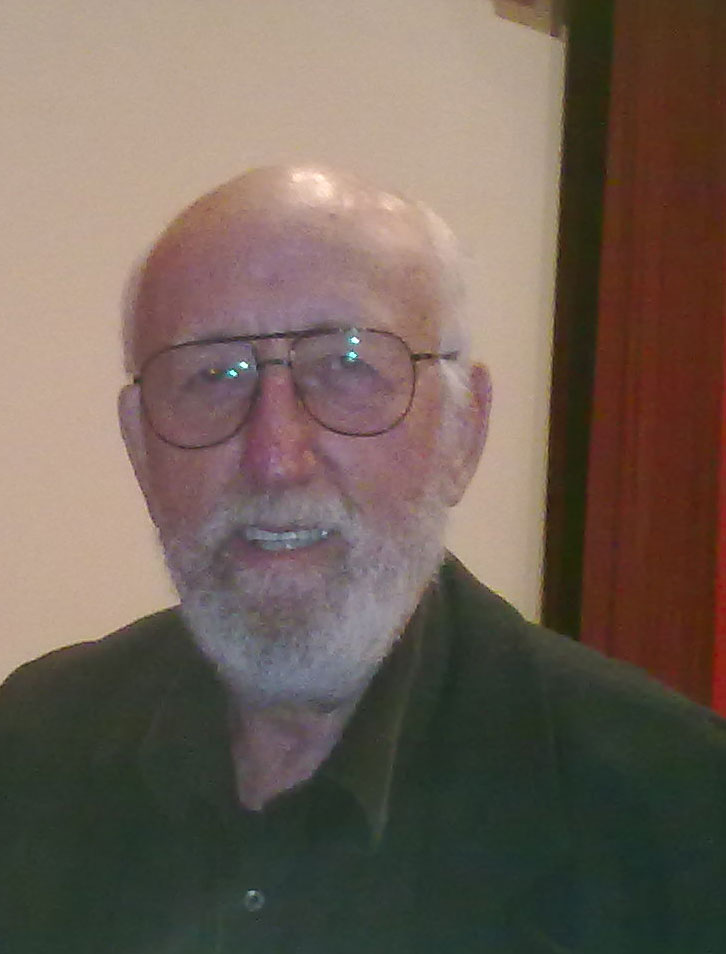
- Born: György Wolf; 12 February 1934; Budapest, Hungary
- Died: 23 February 2019 (aged 85); Tel Aviv, Israel
- Other name: Sámuel Wolf
- Occupation: Actor
- Years active: 1960–2019
- Children: 2

Shmuel Wolf (Hebrew: שמואל וולף; 12 February 1934 – 23 February 2019) was an Israeli actor.

== Biography ==
Born in Budapest, Wolf's mother died at a young age and his father, who sold sewing machines, later remarried. Wolf and his stepmother were forced to relocate to the local ghetto during the Holocaust after his father was murdered by members of the Arrow Cross Party. After the ghetto was liberated in 1945, Wolf resided in a Bnei Akiva camp in France from 1948 until emigrating to Israel the following year. He lived in Masu'ot Yitzhak and then Kfar Masaryk. Wolf also served in the Hashomer Hatzair movement and the Nahal movement. He moved to Tel Aviv in 1959.

From the 1960s onwards, Wolf focused on his career as an actor. He studied acting with Nola Chilton and he became a regular performer at many theatres which included the Ohel Theatre and the Haifa Theatre. Wolf's most popular stage performances was in Josef Mundy’s play It Comes Around in which he performed over 2,000 times.

On film and television, Wolf made his film debut in Sallah Shabati starring Chaim Topol. He was also featured in the 1972 film An American Hippie in Israel. Other films he appeared in included Fifty-Fifty, An Intimate Story and A Woman Called Golda. He also made minor appearances in the television shows Life is Not Everything and Srugim.

=== Personal life ===
Wolf was a longtime partner of the actress and drama teacher Miriam Nevo. In the 1980s, he married the actress Miki Marmur and they had two twin daughters, Roni and Daphne. In 2017, Roni directed a documentary detailing her father's life, which entails aspects such as late fatherhood.

== Death ==
On 23 February 2019, Wolf died in Ichilov Hospital in Tel Aviv following a battle with multiple system atrophy at the age of 85. He was buried at Menucha Nechona Cemetery.
