= Realart Pictures Inc. =

Motion picture distribution company

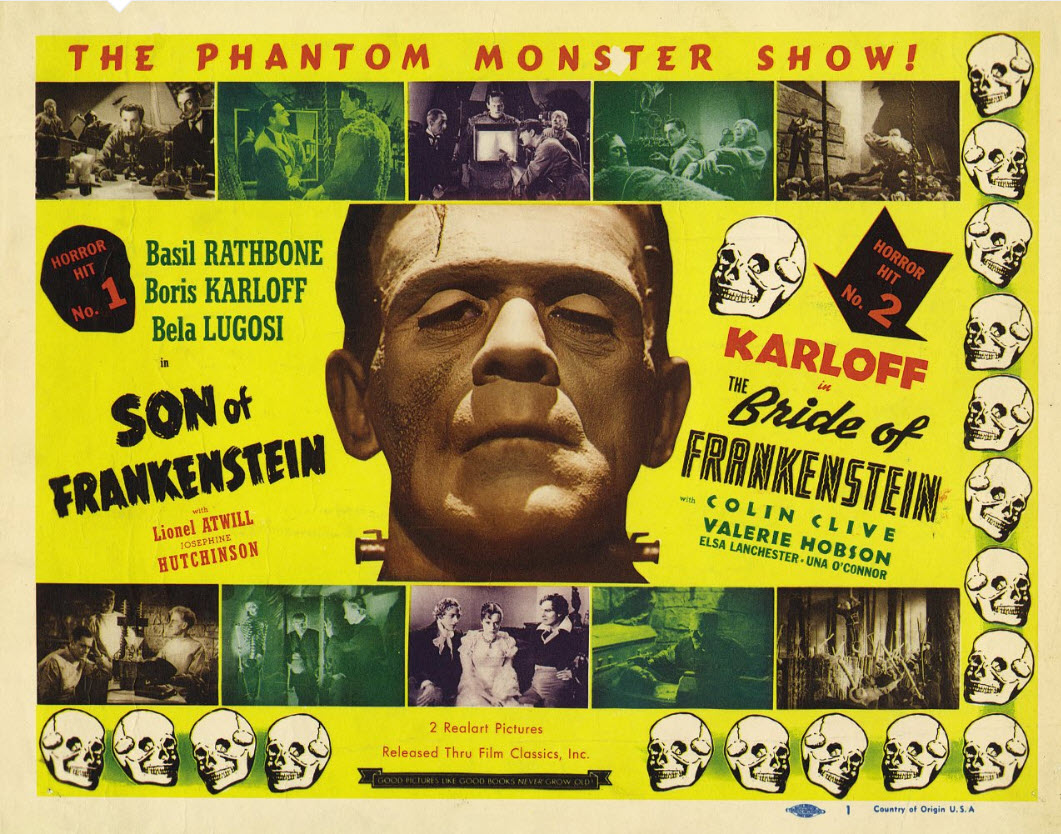
Poster promoting the 1953 Realart re-release of Bride of Frankenstein and Son of Frankenstein on a double bill

Realart Pictures was an American motion picture distribution company founded in 1948 by Jack Broder and Joseph Harris. It specialized in reissues of older pictures, particularly from the library of Universal Pictures, but also handled an occasional pickup or import, as well as the films made by Jack Broder Productions.

It is not to be confused with Realart Productions, a silent movie production unit that was affiliated with Adolph Zukor's Famous Players–Lasky studios, and had no relation to the silent pictures' Realart Pictures Corporation that handled Paramount Pictures releases.

== History ==
When Universal Pictures became Universal-International in 1946, new studio head William Goetz discontinued the studio's B-pictures - comedies, musicals, mysteries, westerns, and serials - to begin a prestigious operation that would feature many independent productions. Goetz had no interest in Universal's sizable backlog, and leased the entire sound-film library (dating from 1930 to 1946) to Broder and Harris. Realart had theatrical reissue rights for 10 years; television rights were not included.

Realart reissued Universal's films in double-feature package deals, with new and more exciting advertising (Universal was never mentioned in the ads or posters). Most films were re-released under their original, familiar titles, while others were given more effective (and often more lurid) titles: The Strange Affair of Uncle Harry became Guilty of Murder; Man-Made Monster became The Atomic Monster; The Mystery of Marie Roget became Phantom of Paris.

Supporting players who had since become stars were now given more prominent billing, such as Robert Mitchum becoming second-billed on the reissue of Gung Ho! (1943); Dan Dailey catapulted to top billing for the reissue of The Andrews Sisters' Give Out, Sisters; and Keefe Brasselle of The Eddie Cantor Story was billed over star Gloria Jean in the waterfront melodrama River Gang. Abbott and Costello were incidental players in their first film, the 1940 Allan Jones musical One Night in the Tropics; Realart removed 13 minutes of footage with the romantic leads, and remarketed the edited version as a full-fledged Abbott & Costello comedy. Realart also acquired non-Universal productions: A Walk in the Sun was retitled Salerno Beachhead.

Theater managers were delighted with Realart's oldies, which did better business than certain new pictures, and Realart prospered. There was a steady market for double features, but exhibitors would not pay a premium for reissues. Realart's Jack Broder saw a chance to make more money by making new films for the double-feature theaters. Broder hired Herman Cohen as a new vice-president and formed Jack Broder Productions, releasing through Realart. These modestly budgeted films included the boxing drama Kid Monk Baroni with a then little known Leonard Nimoy as the title character, and the jungle comedy Bela Lugosi Meets a Brooklyn Gorilla featuring the veteran horror-movie actor and the comedy team of Duke Mitchell and Sammy Petrillo, who imitated Dean Martin and Jerry Lewis. Bride of the Gorilla and Battles of Chief Pontiac ventured into the horror and Western genres, respectively.

Toward the end of Realart's 10-year lease, certain re-releases were themselves re-released (Buck Privates and Little Giant circulated more than once). By the early 1950s, television had become increasingly popular and many neighborhood theaters had closed. Broder sold his own productions to television, with Bela Lugosi Meets a Brooklyn Gorilla making its television debut less than a year after its theatrical run. Broder released only four more Realart originals to theaters: Roger Corman's first film Five Guns West in 1955, Wetbacks in 1956, and a science-fiction/horror double feature Women of the Prehistoric Planet and The Navy vs. the Night Monsters in 1966. However, Realart continued to prosper in distribution through so-called "states' rights" offices in several major cities, handling product for production companies, such as American International Pictures, without a distribution network of their own.
