= Battles of Chief Pontiac =

1952 film by Felix E. Feist

- Theatrical release poster
- Directed by: Felix E. Feist
- Screenplay by: Jack DeWitt
- Produced by: Irving Starr; Jack Broder
- Starring: Lex Barker; Helen Westcott; Lon Chaney Jr.
- Cinematography: Charles Van Enger
- Edited by: Philip Cahn
- Music by: Elmer Bernstein
- Production company: Jack Broder Productions Inc.
- Distributed by: Realart Pictures
- Release date: November 19, 1952 (Newark, New Jersey)
- Running time: 72 minutes
- Country: United States
- Language: English

Battles of Chief Pontiac is a 1952 American Western film directed by Felix E. Feist and starring Lex Barker, Helen Westcott and Lon Chaney Jr. The plot involves a conflict between Ottawa Indians, led by Chief Pontiac and the British in 1763.

== Cast ==
- Lex Barker as Lt. Kent McIntire
- Helen Westcott as Winifred Lancaster
- Lon Chaney Jr. as Chief Pontiac
- Berry Kroeger as Col. von Weber
- Roy Roberts as Maj. Gladwin
- Larry Chance as Hawkbill
- Katherine Warren as Chia
- Ramsay Hill as Gen. Sir Jeffrey Amherst
- Guy Teague as Von Weber's Aide
- James Fairfax as Guardhouse Sentry
- Abner George as Doctor

== Production ==
The film was shot on location in and around Rapid City, South Dakota, selected for both its terrain and its abundance of Indians in the region. Producer Herman Cohen paid a local tribe $150 per week for the use of its people as extras. Cohen found that many of the younger Indians could not appear in the picture because they were unable to shoot arrows, ride bareback on horses or use tomahawks.

== Release ==
In September 1952, producer Jack Broder and his associate Herman Cohen wrote to Detroit Free Press film critic Helen Bower to inquire whether Detroit and Pontiac might be suitable locations for the film's world premiere. In reaction to the letter and some associated press releases, Bower wrote a scathing rebuke of the film's historicity:

The story "deals with the efforts of Barker to avert a full-scale Indian war. The uprising is being incited by a ruthless Hessian officer who, for reasons of blind hatred, wants the British forces to drive the Indians out of the region." This is no less than an insult to the memory of Pontiac's exceptional diplomatic and military talents in forming a confederation of Indian tribes that all but succeeded in exterminating the English. From May, 1763 until Pontiac made a treaty of peace in August, 1765, the whole frontier was in terror and desolation. Garrisons were massacred and eight out of 12 fortified ports were captured by the Indians of the powerful coalition. It was ironic that Pontiac himself failed in his assignment to surprise the garrison at Detroit and was unsuccessful in the subsequent siege of Detroit which lasted into October, 1763.

As if this were not enough, the release continues: "To film this drama of seething conflict, director Felix Feist took his cast and crew to the scenic Indian territory around world-famous Mount Rushmore in South Dakota. The flamboyant canyons, soaring mountains and beautiful lakes of the region provide a perfect setting for the equally colorful adventure story." Remember that the locale is around Fort Detroit, a region never noted for flamboyant canyons and soaring mountains. Of all people, Broder and Cohen should know that. Is this sort of picture-making that disheartens a critic who sincerely wants the motion picture medium to be used to its best possible advantage for entertainment and information. There seems no excuse for trading on history in this instance, not to mention the "stormy romance between the lover's lovely heroine and Barker."

I'm sorry, boys, but I react violently against the world premiere of "Battles of Chief Pontiac" simultaneously in Detroit and Pontiac. I think I would react violently to the picture.

In a column two weeks later, Bower wrote:

Maybe we could have that world premiere of Jack Broder's "Battles of Chief Pontiac" here, after all. Herman Cohen has written that the publicity releases were entirely misleading. "After looking for many weeks for a proper location, Universal Pictures told me of the territory right outside Rapid City, S. D., which resembles Michigan very much," he reports. "In addition, they had recently built a fort in that area which we were permitted to use." There are NOT—Herman's capital letters—any "flamboyant canyons and soaring mountains" in the picture. Herman has instructed the publicity department to submit copies of releases before mailing in future.

The film did not open in Detroit until June 1953, nearly seven months after its November 19, 1952 release in Newark, New Jersey.
