= The Big Gundown =

1967 film by Sergio Sollima

- Italian film poster
- Directed by: Sergio Sollima
- Screenplay by: Sergio Donati; Sergio Sollima
- Story by: Franco Solinas; Fernando Morandi
- Produced by: Alberto Grimaldi
- Starring: Lee Van Cleef; Tomas Milian; Walter Barnes
- Cinematography: Carlo Carlini
- Edited by: Gaby Penalba
- Music by: Ennio Morricone
- Production companies: PEA; Produzioni Cinematographice Tulio Demicheli
- Distributed by: Produzioni Europee Associate (Italy)
- Release dates: March 1967 (Italy); September 29, 1967 (Spain)
- Running time: 110 minutes
- Countries: Italy; Spain
- Language: Italian
- Box office: 1.441 billion ITL (Italy)

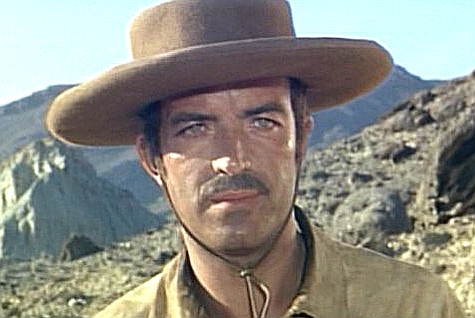
Angel del Pozo as Chet Miller

The Big Gundown (Italian: La resa dei conti, lit. 'The Settling of Scores') is a 1967 spaghetti Western film directed by Sergio Sollima, and starring Lee Van Cleef and Tomas Milian. It was followed by Sollima's Run, Man, Run in 1968, with Milian reprising his role.

== Plot ==
Possessing a reputation for bringing criminals to justice, ready-to-retire bounty hunter Jonathan Corbett (Lee Van Cleef) is summoned to a party by a Texas railroad tycoon by the name of Brokston (Walter Barnes), whose daughter is getting married. Brokston plants the seed that Corbett should consider a run for the Senate, but not before doing one last bounty hunt.

Brokston offers Corbett his political backing in exchange for tracking down a 12-year-old girl's accused rapist and murderer, who goes by the name of Cuchillo (Tomas Milian), a Mexican who is fleeing back to his native land. Cuchillo means "knife" in Spanish, which is the rascal’s weapon of choice. Corbett expects it to be easy, even offering to do it as a wedding gift.

Corbett sets out in pursuit of Cuchillo, who is not as dumb as he acts, and who is rather crafty at vexing Corbett at every turn. Corbett pursues Cuchillo into Mexico, where he is arrested when a fight starts in a brothel. Brokston pulls strings to free Corbett from jail and intercepts him, hiring a gang of mercenaries to find Cuchillo. Corbett learns that Cuchillo is innocent and in fact the witness that Brokston's alcoholic son-in-law, Chet Miller (Ángel del Pozo), was the rapist. Corbett misleads the mercenaries to confront Cuchillo with Chet himself. In the final showdown, Corbett provides a knife to Cuchillo to kill Chet, then killing Brokston himself. The two ride together from the scene before parting ways.

== Cast ==
- Lee Van Cleef as Jonathan "Colorado" Corbett
- Tomas Milian as Manuel "Cuchillo" Sanchez
- Walter Barnes as Brokston
- Nieves Navarro as the widow
- Gérard Herter as Baron von Schulenberg (as Gerard Herter)
- María Granada as Rosita Sanchez
- Robert Camardiel as Sheriff Jellicol (as Robert Camardiel)
- Ángel del Pozo as Chet Miller (as Angel del Pozo)
- Luisa Rivelli as Willow Creek prostitute
- Tom Felleghy as father of Chet Miller (as Tom Felleghi)
- Calistro Calisti as Mr. Lynch
- Benito Stefanelli as Jess, widow's ranchero
- Nello Pazzafini as Hondo, ex-Union outlaw
- Antonio Casas as Brother Smith & Wesson
- José Torres as Paco Molinas
- Antonio Molino Rojo as widow's ranch hand (as Molino Rojo)
- Spartaco Conversi as Prison Guard Mitchell
- Romano Puppo as Rocky, widow's ranch hand
- Fernando Sancho as Captain Segura

== Production ==
The Big Gundown was shot in Almería in late 1966.

== Release ==
The Big Gundown was released in Italy in March 1967 with a running time of 105 minutes. It was released in Spain as El halcón y la presa (English translation, The Falcon and the Prey). On its release in Spain, the climactic cane-field chase was shortened. In the United States and United Kingdom, the film was released by Columbia Pictures in 1968. Most English-dubbed prints have a runtime of 89 minutes; the cuts therein serve primarily to tighten the film's pacing and remove sequences that do not directly serve the film's plot, although Corbett's character is made to appear to more quickly resort to violence compared to his level-headed characterization in the Italian version. Another English version of the film, which runs for 85 minutes, removes all references to the rape and murder which drives the story. The film was a moderate success during its US theatrical run, grossing $2 million.

In December 2013, Grindhouse Releasing, in association with original rights holder Columbia/Sony, re-released the film with two different cuts, the original 110-minute Italian version, and a 95-minute "expanded US cut", which includes three scenes (which also appear in the Italian version) that were prepared for showing on television despite not being present in the original theatrical prints.

== Critical reception ==
In a contemporary review, the Monthly Film Bulletin stated that "at least this makes for a variation on the familiar solitary superman theme, and the two protagonists are given time to create characters with some personality", noting that "the violence is on the whole less gratuitously excessive than usual; and though the plot tends to ramble, there are several impressively staged sequences to keep interest alive-in particular a manhunt with the wily Mexican pursued through cane fields by dogs and an army of trackers".

In a retrospective review, Stuart Galbraith IV remarked that the film was "unusually fine" noting its "taut, intelligent screenplay" and "Lee Van Cleef's marvelous screen presence" and "especially the outstanding musical score by the great Ennio Morricone.“ Daryl Loomis of DVD Verdict commented: “The story, written by Sergio Donati (Duck, You Sucker), is strong, with a darker framing story than one often sees, and a lot of wit and humor throughout... Great performances and some amazing music, combined with strong direction, gorgeous locations, and top-notch camera work (by Carlo Carlini, Death Rides a Horse)... is among the best work of any of the participants' careers... There's no question that, had more people seen The Big Gundown, it would be clearly recognized at the pinnacle of the genre. Luckily, Grindhouse Releasing has graced us with one of the best Blu-ray packages I've seen in a long time... With the extras, the commentaries, and especially the soundtrack CD, this is my pick for Blu-ray release of the year.”
