= Grindhouse Releasing =

American film distributor

- Type: Private
- Industry: Motion picture/distribution
- Founded: 1996
- Founders: Bob Murawski; Sage Stallone
- Headquarters: Los Angeles, California, U.S.
- Key people: Bob Murawski (CEO/COO); Chris Innis (co-producer/editor/writer); David Szulkin (theatrical bookings/publicity)
- Website: www.grindhousereleasing.com

Grindhouse Releasing is a Hollywood-based independent cult film distribution company led by film editor Bob Murawski and co-founded by Sage Stallone. Grindhouse digitally remasters, restores, and produces bonus materials and video documentaries for cult film DVDs and Blu-rays which it distributes on the CAV label.

Grindhouse focuses on the distribution of rare and little-seen independent cult films. Releases have included The Swimmer, a surreal drama featuring Burt Lancaster; The Big Gundown, a spaghetti Western with Lee Van Cleef; and Corruption, a British film starring Peter Cushing.

Grindhouse was the first company to digitally remaster and restore the stylish Italian horror films from the 1970s and 1980s such as Cannibal Ferox (Make Them Die Slowly), Lucio Fulci's The Beyond (...E tu vivrai nel terrore! L'aldilà), as well as the notorious cult classic Cannibal Holocaust directed by Ruggero Deodato. The company also restored and coordinated a limited theatrical re-release of American filmmaker Sam Raimi's cult classic The Evil Dead.

The company has been called the "Criterion" of cult film distribution, employing the highest standards for quality and deluxe bonus materials on their Blu-ray and DVD releases. Coco Hames of the Nashville Scene says of the company: "A Grindhouse release has a rotgut seal of approval, whether it's the kind of gore epic that once played grimy 42nd Street cinemas (Ruggero Deodato's Cannibal Holocaust), an overlooked Hollywood rarity (Frank Perry's The Swimmer), or a long-lost movie by an obsessive auteur that never saw the light of day (Duke Mitchell's Gone with the Pope)".

Grindhouse Releasing was awarded the 2015 International Press Academy's Satellite Award for "Outstanding Overall Blu-Ray/DVD" for its Blu-ray release and restoration of Frank Perry's cult film The Swimmer.
