= Duke Mitchell =

American actor

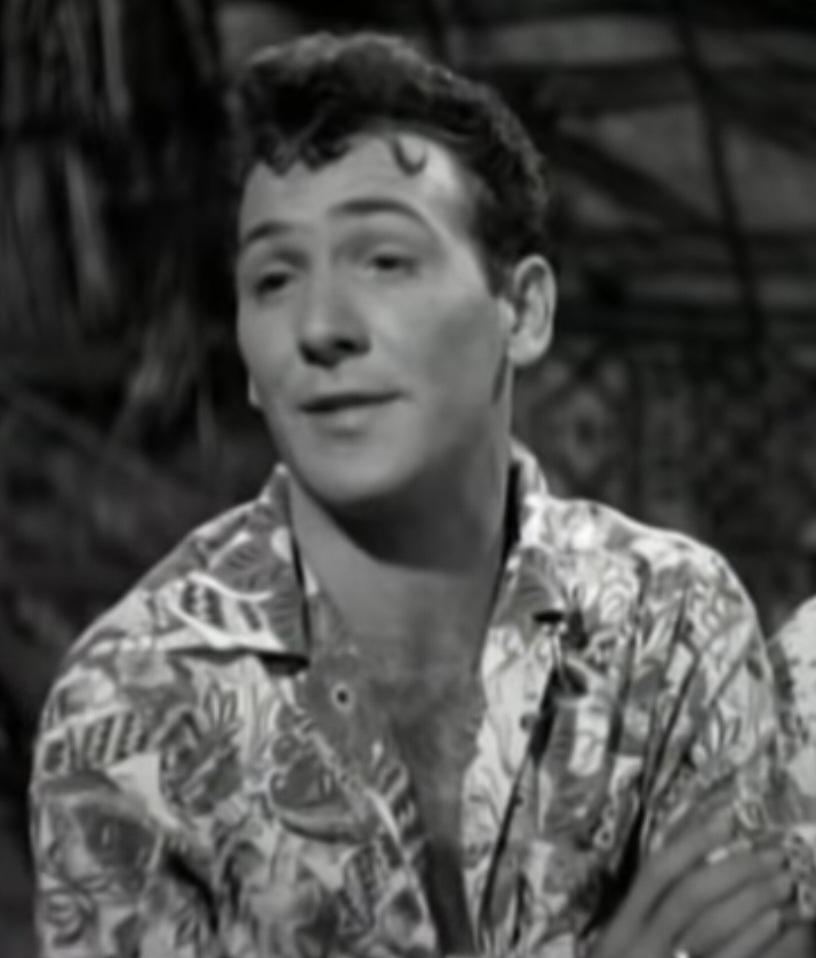
- Mitchell in Bela Lugosi Meets a Brooklyn Gorilla (1952)
- Born: Dominic Salvatore Miceli; May 9, 1926; Farrell, Pennsylvania, U.S.
- Died: December 2, 1981 (aged 55); Hollywood, California, U.S.
- Occupations: Singer; actor; director
- Spouse: Jo Mitchell
- Children: 2

Duke Mitchell (born Dominic Salvatore Miceli; May 9, 1926 – December 2, 1981) was an American film actor, slapstick comedian, crooner and independent film director of 1970s gangster films starring himself. Mitchell often performed his nightclub act in and around Palm Springs, California, and anointed himself the "King of Palm Springs."

== Early life and career ==
On May 9, 1926, Mitchell was born Dominic Salvatore Miceli in Farrell, Pennsylvania. In 1951, he teamed with comic Sammy Petrillo for a nightclub act. Mitchell's cabaret-style crooning and Petrillo's manic, rubber-faced clowning bore more than a passing resemblance to the popular team of Martin and Lewis (Dean Martin and Jerry Lewis, whom Mitchell and Petrillo physically resembled), which led to Lewis taking legal action. The suit was later dismissed.

Movie producer Jack Broder intended to star Mitchell and Petrillo in a feature-length comedy. Petrillo later recalled his suspicion that Broder never really intended to make the film: Broder expected Paramount Pictures to pay him off, but when Paramount dropped the lawsuit, Broder had to follow through. The resulting film was Bela Lugosi Meets a Brooklyn Gorilla, a jungle-themed comedy. Mitchell had a small appearance in the Martin and Lewis film Sailor Beware (1952).

After Mitchell and Petrillo parted ways, Mitchell stayed in show business, performing at nightclubs in New York, Las Vegas, Seattle, Palm Springs, Chicago (opening for his friend Lenny Bruce), and The Cloisters, Crescendo and Coconut Grove in Los Angeles and began directing self-financed independent films such as Massacre Mafia Style (1974) and Gone with the Pope (1976), which have since developed a cult following. In 1960, Mitchell provided the singing voice of Fred Flintstone for his friends William Hanna and Joseph Barbera on The Flintstones episodes "Hot Lips Hannigan" and "Girls' Night Out".

Mitchell was a regular on the scene in Palm Springs, California, where he started the fad and trend of "Sunday Brunches" with shows including Liza Minnelli, David Janssen, Cary Grant, Frank Sinatra, and his son, guitarist/songwriter Jeffrey Mitchell, who got his start at the Ranch Club brunches with his father, Doug McClure, James Drury, and a myriad of stars including Lucille Ball, Red Skelton, Vince Edwards, and acts from the world of show-biz. Stars would take the weekend plunge into the Palm Springs scene and join the brunch festivities on Sunday.

Several of Mitchell’s projects originally weren't released, including his "Tribute to Durante" and his second feature film Gone with the Pope, which only existed as a work print when it was found in Mitchell's son Jeffrey Mitchell's garage by Grindhouse Releasing’s Bob Murawski and Sage Stallone. Sage wanted to purchase Gone with the Pope from Jeffrey Mitchell and he did, save for the musical rights, as Mitchell's music is published out of London. It was carefully restored and released theatrically in 2011 by Grindhouse Releasing, which has also restored and released Mitchell’s Massacre Mafia Style, owned by Jeffrey Mitchell and Bob Murawski, on Blu-ray in 2015.

== Personal life and death ==
Mitchell and his wife, Jo, had two children. On December 2, 1981, Mitchell died of lung cancer at the age of 55.

== Filmography ==
=== Director ===
- Massacre Mafia Style (1974, re-released in 2010 by Grindhouse Releasing) (a.k.a. Like Father Like Son, a.k.a. The Executioner)
- Gone with the Pope (1976, released in 2010 by Grindhouse Releasing)

=== Actor ===
- Bela Lugosi Meets a Brooklyn Gorilla (1952)
- Sailor Beware (1952) (uncredited)
- Crime in the Streets (1956) (uncredited)
- Baby Face Nelson (1957)
- Paradise Alley (1962)
- Massacre Mafia Style (1974)
- Gone with the Pope (1976)
