= Sammy Petrillo =

American comedian (1934–2009)

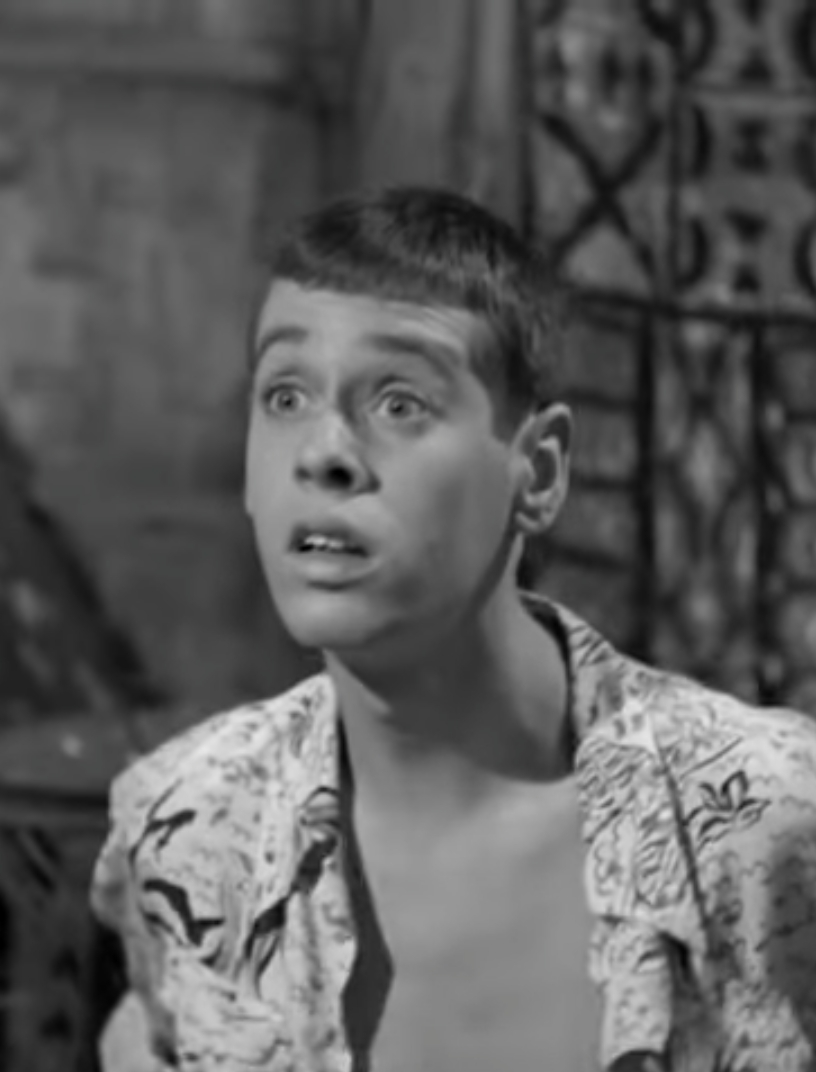
- Petrillo in Bela Lugosi Meets a Brooklyn Gorilla (1952)
- Born: Sam Patrello; October 24, 1934; The Bronx, New York, U.S.
- Died: August 15, 2009 (aged 74); Bronxville, New York, U.S.
- Resting place: Kensico Cemetery, Valhalla, New York
- Other name: Samuel Petrillo

Comedy career
- Years active: 1950–1997
- Medium: Stand up, film

Sam Patrello (October 24, 1934 – August 15, 2009) was an American nightclub and movie comedian most notable as a Jerry Lewis impersonator. Early in his adult life he performed on multiple television shows, most notably The Colgate Comedy Hour. Petrillo joined forces with singer Duke Mitchell to form a comedy act based on Dean Martin and Jerry Lewis with Petrillo imitating Lewis. Together, they starred in the 1952 film Bela Lugosi Meets a Brooklyn Gorilla.

== Early life ==
Sammy Petrillo was born Sam Patrello in The Bronx, New York City, New York, to a show-business family in which his mother, Anne Jackowitz Patrello, was Alice Faye's double, and his father, Abraham Patrello, "was a comic and a hoofer" [dancer] who performed in Catskills Mountains resorts and went by the stage name Skelly Petrillo. By age six, Sammy would sometimes join his father onstage. Petrillo, who had one younger sibling, brother Marvin, was raised in a housing project at 143rd Street and Morris Avenue, and attended the High School of Performing Arts, in Manhattan.

In a 1992 interview, he recalled the genesis of his Jerry Lewis look:

One day I went down to the Annex at the High School of Performing Arts. The Annex was a trade school and they had people who were learning how to cut hair. And so I got a freebie haircut and the guy cut my hair and he started to laugh. And I said, 'Whatta ya laughing at?' and he said, 'You look just like that [nightclub and film comedian] Jerry Lewis!' And I said, 'Get outta here!' And everywhere I walked, people laughed and asked me if I was Jerry Lewis, it was unbelievable. And Jerry Lewis at the time, I guess, had made his second motion picture, My Friend Irma Goes West. I really didn't know that much about him. I kinda caught some glimpses of the movie and I saw he went, 'Ock! Ock! Ock!' And he talked kinda high.... And I said, 'Gee, maybe I do resemble that guy and I can do that kind of a laugh, I could do that kind of a voice....

== Career ==
After finagling a meeting with comic Milton Berle, then rehearsing at Nova Studios in New York City, Berle sent Petrillo and Berle's agent, Herb Jaffee, to meet with Jerry Lewis at the Sherry-Netherland Hotel in Manhattan. Lewis, after overcoming his initial trepidation — "Jerry said a couple of derogatory things to me", Petrillo recalled in the same interview. "He said something to the effect of, 'Don't sign any checks and tell people you're Jerry Lewis!' He wasn't being funny. He was being serious" — hired the 16-year-old Petrillo for a sketch with him on NBC's Colgate Comedy Hour television series. Petrillo rehearsed "for about a week over at the Mayflower Catering Hall on West 43rd Street", and was paid "about $60" for playing Lewis's baby in a crib, though only at the end of the sketch, in which Petrillo has no lines. The episode ran November 12, 1950.

Petrillo said in a 1991 interview that a favorable writeup in the trade paper Variety prompted Lewis to have Petrillo sign with Lewis's talent agency, MCA. Despite promises by Lewis, Petrillo found no work. After New York Journal-American entertainment writer Jack O'Brian remarked that he hoped Lewis had nothing to do with Petrillo's predicament, Petrillo said he and his father realized that Lewis was "keeping me on a shelf because he doesn't want me to work". His father got Petrillo, a minor, released from his MCA contract.

Petrillo went on to perform comedy once more on The Colgate Comedy Hour, in a sketch with host Eddie Cantor, and also appeared on NBC's Four Star Revue with the comedy team of Olsen and Johnson; NBC's Texaco Star Theater, starring Berle; ABC's Stop the Music; and several local New York City quiz shows and variety shows.

=== Teaming with Duke Mitchell ===
On one such local show, the seminal late-night television program Seven at Eleven, Petrillo met singer George DeWitt, emcee of the NBC musical quiz series Name That Tune. Forming a nightclub team, the duo played at such major spots as the Paramount Theatre and the Copacabana in New York, and the Flamingo Hotel in Las Vegas, Nevada, disbanding there.

Petrillo relocated to Los Angeles, California, where he eventually teamed with singer Duke Mitchell for a successful nightclub act approximating the popular Dean Martin and Jerry Lewis team. Petrillo in 1992 recalled how he and Mitchell began working together:

I met comedian Joe E. [Ross] in California when I was broke and Joe E. took me under his wing. I lived at his apartment with him and a fellow named Al Cook who was in the siding business. And Joe E. used to take care of me and give me some money so I could buy some food. Joe E. got me a job at a little [nightclub] called the Atoto House. ... So he got me this job and I made $65 a week at that time. Then his friend Al Cook said, 'I know this fella Duke Mitchell and you guys would be great together blah blah blah', so he introduced me to Duke Mitchell (who was also getting $65 a week) and that's where we started out as a team.

In addition to impersonating Martin & Lewis, Petrillo mimicked other film stars and cartoon characters, and Mitchell would sing in the styles of Frankie Laine, Vaughn Monroe, and Billy Daniels, among others. For the climax of the show, they would announce to the audience that they would now do their impression of Martin and Lewis — followed by Petrillo playing Martin and Mitchell playing Lewis, inverting expectations.

In 1952, movie producer Jack Broder, president of Realart Pictures, hired Mitchell and Petrillo to star opposite aged screen legend Bela Lugosi and the latest incarnation of the Tarzan film-series chimpanzee Cheeta in a low-budget, jungle-themed comedy, Bela Lugosi Meets a Brooklyn Gorilla (also known as The Boys From Brooklyn).

=== Through mid-1950s ===
Mitchell and Petrillo returned to nightclub work but, according to Petrillo, Lewis threatened to boycott anyone who booked them and club owners caved, not wishing to spoil their chances of someday hiring Martin and Lewis. Petrillo in 1991 recalled an instance after he and Mitchell were booked on the Colgate Comedy Hour, being hosted by the comedy team Abbott and Costello:

There was one of Jerry's cronies — one of the guys that worked for him — at the rehearsal. And he looked at us, and he walked out of the room. I turned to Duke and I said, 'That guy just went to call Jerry. We're off the show'. And then Lou Costello walked over to us and he says, 'Fellas, I hate to tell you this: NBC will not allow us to put you on the show, but we're gonna pay you anyway'. He said Jerry Lewis did it. That really happened, and then it happened in nightclubs. We were blackballed here and there.

Regardless, Allied Artists film studio offered Mitchell and Petrillo a contract, and the production company Federal Films pitched the two on a TV series. "We were offered things we turned down. We were stupid", Petrillo said in 1991. The duo did play the Flamingo Hotel in Las Vegas, and Hollywood's famed Cocoanut Grove, and made a single TV appearance as a team, on the local L.A. program The Spade Cooley Show, starring American Western swing musician and big band leader Donnell Clyde "Spade" Cooley. In 1953, Petrillo, solo, guest-starred in a TV pilot, Wings for Hire, starring Lawrence Tierney and filmed in Florida. Petrillo would later become head of production for the Network Film Corporation owned by Dick Randall, producer of that pilot and of several films.

Mitchell and Petrillo amicably dissolved their professional relationship in 1954, but reteamed the following year. The duo broke up for good following the highly public, July 25, 1956, breakup of Martin and Lewis.

== Later career ==
For Randall's Network Film Corporation, Petrillo produced and co-wrote the 1958 NBC television special Holiday in Brussels, mixed NBC footage from the Brussels World's Fair, with Petrillo shooting additional of New York City's Central Park standing in for the Belgian capital. In 1959, he appeared on the talk show The Steve Allen Show, on an edition with fellow guests Don Knotts and Diana Dors.

He starred in producer Randall's low-budget Shangri-La (1961), a "nudie cutie" exploitation film, and after appearing on the set of his director friend Joseph Green's The Brain That Wouldn't Die (1962), played a cheesecake photographer, earning $90 for the improvised scene. In 1963, Randall released two comedy albums featuring Petrillo: All About Cleopatra, capitalizing on the Cleopatra craze of the time, and also featuring Will Jordan, Joel Holt, and Dave Shor; and My Son the Phone Caller, a collection of humorous, real-life crank telephone calls.

Petrillo again starred opposite Lawrence Tierney, in Randall's uncompleted or unreleased Unholy Alliance, filmed in and around a Catskills Mountains resort. In the mid 1970s, Petrillo starred in film buff Bill Gyorfy's uncompleted superhero-comedy film Gas Is Best, about a man who gains superpowers by drinking a celery tonic, and flies via flatulence. The movie was shot in and around Pittsburgh, Pennsylvania during the summer of 1976. Gyorfy utilized the talents of one of his high school students, Mike Hart, at the age of 17 as assistant director and he helped re-write part of the script. Another obscure film Petrillo produced and in which he starred, Off the Wall, reportedly had a brief release in the early 1970s.

Through Gyorfy, Petrillo met exploitation film legend Doris Wishman, and performed two days of filming on the soft-core sex comedy Keyholes Are for Peeping (1972), built around extant sex footage. Though Petrillo says Wishman promised a two-picture deal, and that if he would "make the first movie for me cheap, I'll be your partner in the second one", that did not come to pass. Wishman's next film was the cult classic Deadly Weapons, starring the stupendously endowed big-bust stripper Chesty Morgan, who was handled by the same agent as Petrillo.

At an unspecified point, Petrillo said in 1992, he starred in a television series titled The Sammy Petrillo Show, on which ukulele novelty act Tiny Tim was a guest star. Afterward Petrillo starred in a children's TV program, Uncle Sammy; and produced and directed "a couple of infomercials" with comic actor Al "Grampa" Lewis. He wrote a TV-series treatment, titled "My Daddy Was a Monster", that served as the basis for the 1960s sitcom The Munsters, and wrote lyrics for the Isley Brothers' song "Angels Cried".

In the late 1970s, Petrillo rekindled his friendship and again worked with Duke Mitchell in California, where Petrillo became a distributor for the Transcontinental Film Corporation. The company was in talks to release Mitchell's 1974 movie Massacre Mafia Style, a.k.a. Like Father, Like Son, a.k.a. The Executioner, which finally appeared direct-to-video on the Video Gems label sometime after Mitchell's death in 1981.

In 1980, Petrillo and standup comic Adam Keith starred in a sketch-comedy film, Out to Lunch, produced by J. G. Tiger in association with Paul Tongue and which "played around New York". Also that year, Petrillo dubbed the voice of a seaside CEO, "Mr. Boden", in the New World Pictures horror movie Humanoids from the Deep.

Petrillo twice appeared as a guest in 1988 and 1991 on Beyond Vaudeville.

On the October 5, 1982, edition of the TV morning show Today, host Bryant Gumbel showed a montage of clips of guest Jerry Lewis, there promoting his autobiography Jerry Lewis in Person and the movie The King of Comedy. The first clip, however, showed not Lewis but Petrillo in a Colgate Comedy Hour sketch with Eddie Cantor. Lewis remarked on air:

It was Sammy Petrillo, a kid that I found walked on 53rd Street here in New York, and I brought him out to Hollywood to work on a sketch with Dean and I [sic], and then he worked with Eddie Cantor two weeks later.

Petrillo recalled in 1991 that he shortly afterward received a call from bookers at the NBC talk show Late Night with David Letterman, on which Lewis was scheduled to appear; Petrillo said they asked him to make a surprise appearance, and that he turned down the offer.

== Final years ==
By 1991, Petrillo was living in Pittsburgh, where he ran a family-oriented comedy club, The Nut House, and, elsewhere in the city, emceed stage shows starring such porn stars as Georgina Spelvin. "I was accepted by people in both things without any tarnishment on my character", Petrillo recalled. He and comedian girlfriend Suzie Perkovic, a.k.a. Suzie Fiore, became business partners, and performed comedy onstage for over ten years as Suzie & Sammy.

== Death ==
On August 15, 2009, Petrillo died of colon cancer at age 74 at Lawrence Hospital in Bronxville, New York. At the time of his death, he lived in Tuckahoe, New York. He is buried at Kensico Cemetery in Valhalla, New York.

Petrillo's grave at the Actors' Fund section at the Kensico Cemetery in Valhalla, New York

== Legacy ==
Petrillo mentored young comics including Richard Pryor and Dennis Miller, the latter a native of Petrillo's adopted home, Pittsburgh.

One of Jerry Lewis' sons, Gary, told The New York Times upon Petrillo's death that, "When Sammy and the other guy played in that gorilla movie, I remember my dad and Dean [Martin] saying, 'We got to sue these guys — this is no good' ... Whenever there was any mention of Sammy Petrillo, it was a tense moment".
