= Bela Lugosi Meets a Brooklyn Gorilla =

1952 film by William Beaudine

- Theatrical release poster
- Directed by: William Beaudine
- Screenplay by: Tim Ryan additional dialogue by "Ukie" Sherin and Edmond G. Seward
- Produced by: Maurice Duke; Herman Cohen
- Starring: Béla Lugosi; Duke Mitchell; Sammy Petrillo; Ray Corrigan
- Cinematography: Charles Van Enger
- Edited by: Philip Cahn
- Music by: Richard P. Hazard
- Distributed by: Jack Broder Productions
- Release date: October 8, 1952 (Los Angeles)
- Running time: 74 minutes
- Country: United States
- Language: English
- Budget: $100,000

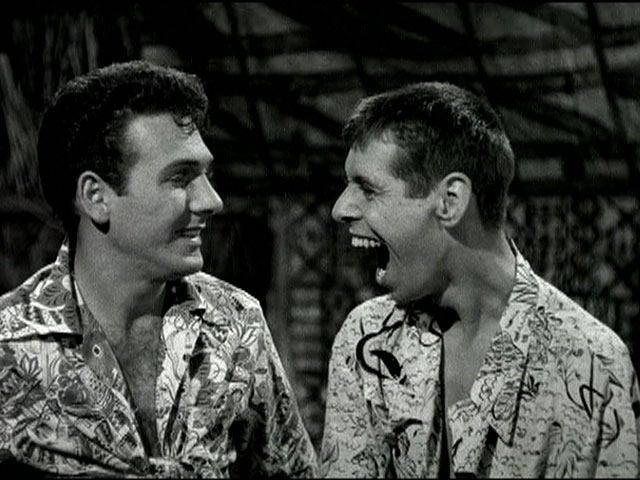
Mitchell and Petrillo in Bela Lugosi Meets a Brooklyn Gorilla

Bela Lugosi Meets a Brooklyn Gorilla (later reissued as The Boys from Brooklyn) is a 1952 American comedy horror film directed by William Beaudine. The film stars veteran horror personality Béla Lugosi and introduces the young comedy team of Duke Mitchell and Sammy Petrillo. The film was released in the United Kingdom under the title of The Monster Meets the Gorilla.

== Plot ==
Natives on a jungle island find two long-haired, bearded men dressed in frayed tuxedos asleep in the jungle and carry them to their chief and his daughter, who insists on protecting them. She mimes instructions that the men are to be dressed, shaven and given haircuts, all while they are still asleep. Upon waking, the men introduce themselves to the chief's daughter Nona and explain that they had fallen from a plane en route to Guam, deployed their parachutes and have been living on wild berries and raw fish. Nona explains that her father is Chief Rakos, tribal leader.

At a luau, Duke establishes a closer relationship with Nona while Sammy is introduced to Nona's overly friendly and plump sister Saloma, causing him to join the luau dancers and perform a comedy routine, followed by Duke's rendition of "'Deed I Do". Nona tells Duke that she was educated in an American college to prepare her for ruling the island as its queen.

When Duke inquires about leaving the island, Nona suggests that Dr. Zabor, conducting scientific experiments on the island, might help. Dr. Zabor agrees to help Duke and Sammy leave the island, and offers them the use of his castle and wardrobe. He has designs on Nona and sends his assistant Chula to spy on her with Duke. Back in the laboratory, Dr. Zabor injects the chimpanzee Ramona, transforming her into a small monkey with a tail.

The following morning, as Nona returns to the laboratory, Dr. Zabor realizes that the serum's effect was only temporary and that Ramona has reverted to a chimp. He injects Duke with the serum and watches him transform into a gorilla.

As Nona and Sammy return to the laboratory in search of Duke, Dr. Zabor claims that the gorilla is actually Ramona. He and Nona travel the village, leaving Sammy in the laboratory with the gorilla, who pantomimes to Sammy that he is really Duke. Upon reaching the village, Sammy explains to Nona that the gorilla is Duke. She embraces the gorilla as Chula arrives with Dr. Zabor, who aims his rifle at the gorilla. Sammy shields the gorilla with his body and is wounded. As the gorilla kneels over Sammy and pats his face, the scene shifts to Duke and Sammy in the dressing room of a New Jersey nightclub. Nona is in the gorilla-trainer act, with Chief Rakos in a gorilla suit. Chula is a waiter and Dr. Zabor is the manager of the club.

== Cast ==
- Béla Lugosi as Dr. Zabor
- Duke Mitchell as himself
- Sammy Petrillo as himself
- Charlita as Nona
- Muriel Landers as Saloma
- Al Kikume as Chief Rakos
- Mickey Simpson as Chula
- Milton Newberger as Witch Doctor Bongo
- Martin Garralaga as Pepe Bordo
- Ramona, the Chimp
- Steve Calvert as the Brooklyn Gorilla (uncredited)
- Ray Corrigan as the Jungle Gorilla (uncredited)

== Production ==
Duke Mitchell and Sammy Petrillo performed a musical-comedy nightclub act in the style of Martin and Lewis. Their manager Maurice Duke pitched the idea of them starring in a film to several studios, including Realart Pictures, whose owner Jack Broder found their act hilarious although his assistant, producer Herman Cohen, disagreed. Bela Lugosi Meets a Brooklyn Gorilla was to be the first in a series of films starring Mitchell and Petrillo, although it is their only feature-film appearance together.

According to Cohen, Jerry Lewis was furious when he learned of the film project and angrily confronted Broder. Paramount Pictures producer Hal B. Wallis, who had Martin and Lewis under contract, threatened to sue Broder for releasing a film that featured a team that closely resembled Martin and Lewis. After shooting wrapped, Broder offered to sell Wallis the film's negative for a substantial sum. Although Wallis wanted to buy it in order to destroy it, the men could not agree on a price. Broder, forced to recoup his investment himself, released the film through Realart. Wallis never spoke to Broder again.

Béla Lugosi, ill from his morphine addiction and with his career in sharp decline, was cast because Realart had reissued his Universal Pictures horror films. Although the film was originally titled White Woman of the Lost Jungle, Broder's young son suggested the title of Bela Lugosi Meets a Brooklyn Gorilla. Cohen retitled the film to capitalize upon Lugosi's appearance.

The film was produced over a six-day period at the General Service Studios in Los Angeles on a budget of $100,000. It resembles one of the popular Bowery Boys comedies, in that the director, the three writers, and the ingenue had all recently worked at Monogram Pictures with Leo Gorcey and Huntz Hall, on $100,000 budgets. Producer Herman Cohen confirmed that the resemblance was definitely intentional. "I signed William Beaudine to direct—I got him to direct the picture because he did the Leo Gorcey-Huntz Hall Bowery Boys movies at Monogram. And he was wonderful. I mean, no prima donna in him at all. I loved that old guy. He just loved the business, he was unbelievable."

== Reception ==
Although the film received no outright rave reviews when released, trade critics rated the film as an acceptable carbon of a Martin and Lewis picture that might get by on its novelty value. Boxoffice gave it the best review: "This is a broadly played farce which burlesques jungle horror pictures to a fare-thee-well. Béla Lugosi, who plays his formula evil scientist role straight throughout, will have marquee value for the horror devotees, and the younger fans will be intrigued by the lobby blowups of Duke Mitchell and Sammy Petrillo, who resemble the more famous Dean Martin and Jerry Lewis. Undiscriminating neighborhood and small-town audiences will get some laughs." The Exhibitor recognized the same opportunity for showmen to promote the new Mitchell & Petrillo team: "Although this suffers from a weak script, the direct takeoff on the Martin and Lewis type of comedy by the comedy team makes this okeh [sic] for exploitation houses. Except for Lugosi, the cast is made up of unknowns. The direction and production are adequate."

Other reviewers faulted the film's flimsy construction. Trade publisher Pete Harrison gave director Beaudine the benefit of the doubt: "It is unlikely that many picturegoers will find it good entertainment, in spite of the fact that William Beaudine, a fine craftsman, directed it. It might have turned out to be a good entertainment if the director had been given a better story. As it is, it may get by on the lower half of a double bill in secondary situations." The Hollywood Reporter concurred: "William Beaudine's direction merely proves that the best of directors are helpless when given a hopeless story and a weak cast." Variety summed it up as a "mediocre horror-comedy; exploitable potential in Martin & Lewis look-alikes Duke Mitchell & Sammy Petrillo. Thesping is routine. Lugosi is menacing, and Charlita lends some eye appeal as the saronged femme interest." Seraphina Alaino of the New York Daily News wrote: "Duke Mitchell and Sammy Petrillo [are] an outrageous imitation of the comedians Dean Martin and Jerry Lewis. Just in case some faithful fans of the famous pair might be tempted to compare the teams, don't waste your time... Come to think of it, Ramona the chimp was the only authentic actor among the crew."

Financially the film, while not a blockbuster, was a modest hit according to Herman Cohen: "The picture didn't have to do too much to make its money back, we only spent about $100,000 on it. It didn't break any records anyplace, but it did well. Then it became a cult thing because of Béla Lugosi."

== Legacy ==
Bela Lugosi Meets a Brooklyn Gorilla entered the public domain in 1980, and film and video distributors made the film widely available to collectors. Because the film had never received very wide distribution in its day, few contemporary viewers had seen it; Bela Lugosi Meets a Brooklyn Gorilla has since been included in many Lugosi and comedy collections, sometimes under its reissue title, The Boys from Brooklyn. In his long-running Movie Guide, Leonard Maltin jokingly called it "one of the all-time greats." Decades later, the film was referenced by Martin Landau, who watched it three times in preparation for his role as Lugosi in the biopic Ed Wood, saying that it was "so bad that it made Ed Wood's films look like Gone with the Wind."
