= Tige Andrews =

American actor (1920–2007)

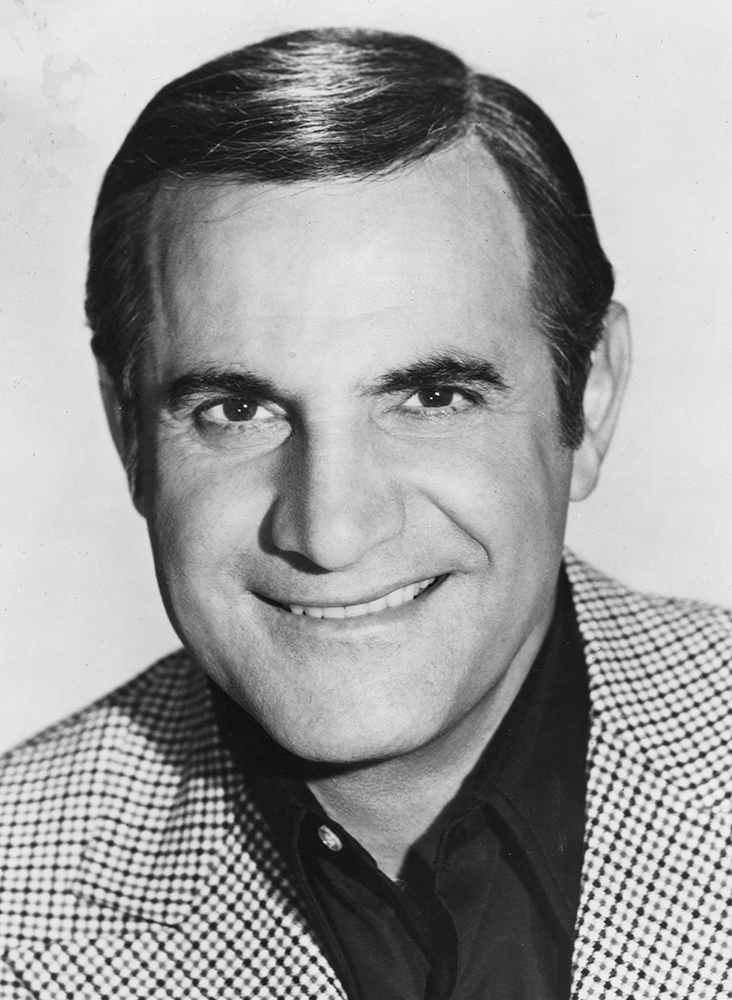
- Born: Tiger Androwas; March 19, 1920; Brooklyn, New York, U.S.
- Died: January 27, 2007 (aged 86); Encino, California, U.S.
- Education: American Academy of Dramatic Arts
- Occupation: Actor
- Years active: 1948–1991
- Spouses: Josephine Bernice Phillips (m. 1944; div. 1946) Norma Thornton (m. 1950; died 1996)
- Children: 6

Tige Andrews (born Tiger Androwas; March 19, 1920 – January 27, 2007) was an American character actor. He is best remembered for his law-enforcement roles as Captain Adam Greer and Lieutenant Johnny Russo in two ABC crime drama television series: The Mod Squad, and The Detectives Starring Robert Taylor, respectively.

== Early life ==
Andrews was born Tiger Androwas in Brooklyn, New York, one of ten children to Selma (née Shaleesh; Arabic: سيلما شاليش) and George E. Androwas (Arabic: جورج اندروز), who immigrated from what is now Syria and Lebanon. His family's surname was originally "Androwas". His parents, following Syrian custom, named him after a strong animal to ensure good health. His mother died when he was three years old, and his father later remarried. Andrews moved with his family to Middlesex, New Jersey, where Andrews graduated from Bound Brook High School. His father was in the fruit business, and Andrews worked for his father.

Andrews attended classes for a time at the University of Beirut medical school. During World War II, Andrews served with the United States Army's 45th Infantry Division, rising to the rank of second lieutenant. He was medically discharged in 1944 for injuries sustained when his ship sank in the Mediterranean. He graduated from the American Academy of Dramatic Arts in New York in 1946.

== Career ==
He appeared in the original 1948 cast of Thomas Heggen and Joshua Logan's war comedy Mister Roberts, in which he played the roles of Schlemmer and Insigna. He changed his stage name from "Tiger" to "Tige" in 1954.

Director John Ford saw the play while visiting New York and, remembering his performance in it years later, cast him in the 1955 film version of Mister Roberts. Andrews and Henry Fonda were the only members of the Broadway cast to appear in the film.

Back in New York in 1955, Andrews won critical acclaim as The Streetsinger in the long-running revival of Marc Blitzstein's translation of the Brecht-Weill musical, The Threepenny Opera, off-Broadway. It featured German star Lotte Lenya and an ensemble cast of future stars, including Beatrice Arthur, Jo Sullivan, John Astin, Jerry Orbach, Ed Asner, and Jerry Stiller. He reprised the role in San Francisco and Los Angeles and went on to direct The Threepenny Opera in Arizona.

Andrews made frequent appearances on television in the 1960s. In addition to being a cast member of The Phil Silvers Show (1955–1957, as Tiger Andrews), Andrews appeared in such series as U.S. Marshal; The Lawless Years; Mr. Novak; Dundee and the Culhane; The Big Valley; The Fugitive; Gunsmoke; Gomer Pyle - U.S.M.C.; and Star Trek as Kras in the episode "Friday's Child", in which he was the first Klingon ever to die in that series.

His best known roles were Lieutenant Johnny Russo on The Detectives and as Captain Adam Greer on The Mod Squad. For the latter role, he received both an Emmy and a Golden Globe award nomination and won a Logie Award. Andrews reunited with his fellow Mod Squad cast members for a 1979 made-for-television film, The Return Of Mod Squad; it was their last appearance together. After The Mod Squad ended, Andrews continued to make guest appearances on various television series, such as Kojak; Marcus Welby, M.D.; Police Story; CHiPs; and Murder, She Wrote.

His film career included roles in Onionhead (1958), A Private's Affair (1959), In Enemy Country (1968), The Last Tycoon (1976), and Raid on Entebbe (1977, as Shimon Peres). He retired from acting in the early 1990s after having appeared in more than one hundred acting roles onstage, on film and on television.

In addition to his acting career, Andrews was an accomplished painter and singer. His artwork has been shown in Los Angeles art galleries, and some was published in the book Actors As Artists by Jim McMullan and Dick Gautier. He collaborated with Sandy Matlowsky and Sid Kuller on two original songs on his Tiger Records label in Los Angeles, California. "The Modfather" and "Keep America Beautiful" were the A and B sides of the vinyl 45 single release.

== Personal life ==
In 1950 he married Norma Thornton, a ballerina who was a regular on The Ed Sullivan Show and appeared in the Broadway play Gentlemen Prefer Blondes. They had six children, three boys and three girls: Barbara, Gina, Julie, John, Steve and Tony, and eleven grandchildren. He was previously married to Josephine Phillips, whom he wed in 1944 after his medical discharge from the Army. Norma Thornton Andrews died in 1996.

== Death ==
Andrews died of cardiac arrest at his home in Encino, California, on January 27, 2007, aged 86.

== Filmography ==
=== Film ===
| Year | Title | Role | Notes |
|---|---|---|---|
| 1955 | Mister Roberts | Wiley | |
| 1957 | The Wings of Eagles | Arizona Pincus | Uncredited |
| 1957 | Until They Sail | US Marine, Store Customer | |
| 1958 | China Doll | Cpl. Carlo Menotti | |
| 1958 | Imitation General | Pvt. Orville Hutchmeyer | |
| 1958 | Onionhead | Charlie Berger | |
| 1959 | A Private's Affair | Sgt. Pickerell | |
| 1968 | In Enemy Country | Nicolay | |
| 1976 | The Last Tycoon | Popolos | |
| 1990 | Gypsy Angels | Ted | |

=== Television ===
| Year | Title | Role | Notes |
|---|---|---|---|
| 1951 | Kraft Television Theatre | | Episode: "Moon Over Mulberry Street" |
| 1952 | The Hunter | | Episode: "The Ghost Goes East" |
| 1952–1953 | Armstrong Circle Theatre | Sam | 2 episodes |
| 1953 | Suspense | 1st Thug | Episode: "The Quarry" |
| 1953 | Plymouth Playhouse | | Episode: "Jetfighter" |
| 1954 | Inner Sanctum | Reed | Episode: "The Hermit" |
| 1955–1956 | The Phil Silvers Show | Pvt. Gander | 22 episodes |
| 1957–1968 | Gunsmoke | Jose Santillo / Mike Postil | 2 episodes |
| 1958 | The Walter Winchell File | Frank | Episode: "The Box Men: File #38" |
| 1958 | U.S. Marshal | Sam | Episode: "Mechanic" |
| 1958 | Steve Canyon | Sgt. Bagdasarian | Episode: "Operation Jettison" |
| 1958–1959 | Playhouse 90 | Bassi / Frank Nitti | 2 episodes |
| 1959 | Zorro | Nava | Episode: "The Iron Box" |
| 1959 | The Lawless Years | Tony Morelli | Episode: "The Tony Morelli Story" |
| 1959 | Grand Jury | Ben | Episode: "Fire Trap" |
| 1959–1962 | The Detectives | Det. Lt. John Russo / Lt. John Russo | 97 episodes |
| 1961 | The Best of the Post | C.P.O. Jacobsen | Episode: "Band of Brothers" |
| 1961 | Adventures in Paradise | Jay Jay Jenkins | Episode: "Wild Mangoes" |
| 1961 | The Dick Powell Show | Paul Manzuk | Episode: "Somebody's Waiting" |
| 1962 | Alcoa Premiere | Gaby Lasalle | Episode: "Flashing Spikes" |
| 1962 | Ensign O'Toole | Soilman | Episode: "Operation: Holdout" |
| 1962–1965 | Ben Casey | Dave McClusky / Cash Burdock | 2 episodes |
| 1963 | Sam Benedict | Bill Yohler | Episode: "Green Room, Grey Morning" |
| 1963 | Mr. Novak | Lt. Charles Green | Episode: "A Single Isolated Incident" |
| 1964 | Dr. Kildare | Roy Winters | Episode: "The Middle of Ernie Mann" |
| 1965 | Slattery's People | Horse | Episode: "Question: Who You Taking to the Main Event, Eddie?" |
| 1965 | 12 O'Clock High | Master Sgt. Tony Podesta | Episode: "R/X for a Sick Bird" |
| 1965 | Gomer Pyle - U.S.M.C. | Chief Petty Officer | 3 episodes |
| 1966 | Jericho | Francois Leboult | Episode: "Wall to Wall Kaput" |
| 1966 | Run for Your Life | Sam Miller | Episode: "A Game of Violence" |
| 1967 | The Big Valley | Bodos Garcos | Episode: "Wagonload of Dreams" |
| 1967 | The Fugitive | Buck Leonard | Episode: "The Walls of Night" |
| 1967 | The F.B.I. | John Forno | Episode: "Force of Nature" |
| 1967 | Bob Hope Presents the Chrysler Theatre | Det. Owens | Episode: "Deadlock" |
| 1967 | Dundee and the Culhane | Nicasio | Episode: "The Jubilee Raid Brief" |
| 1967 | Star Trek: The Original Series | Kras | Episode: "Friday's Child" |
| 1968 | Premiere | Albert Sanchez | Episode: "The Freebooters" |
| 1968–1973 | The Mod Squad | Capt. Adam Greer | 123 episodes Nominated—Golden Globe Award for Best Supporting Actor – Series, Miniseries or Television Film (1971); Nominated—Primetime Emmy Award for Outstanding Supporting Actor in a Drama Series (1970) |
| 1973 | Marcus Welby, M.D. | Fred Pulaski | Episode: "For Services Rendered" |
| 1974 | Skyway to Death | Sam Nichols | Television film |
| 1974–1975 | Police Story | Blodgett / Sergeant Kidder | 3 episodes |
| 1974–1978 | Kojak | Sergeant Geno Polucci / Joe Paxton / Aaron Fisk | 4 episodes |
| 1975 | The Wide World of Mystery | Bert / the Werewolf | Episode: "The Werewolf of Woodstock" |
| 1975 | Amy Prentiss | Adams | Episode: "Profile in Evil" |
| 1975 | Barbary Coast | Phineas T. James | Episode: "An Iron-Clad Plan" |
| 1975 | Police Woman | Lieutenant McKay | Episode: "The Purge" |
| 1976 | Good Heavens | Jack McMann | Episode: "Take Me Out to the Ball Game" |
| 1977 | Raid on Entebbe | Shimon Peres | Television film |
| 1978 | Flying High | Blakely | Episode: "The Marcy Connection" |
| 1978–1981 | CHiPs | Charley Davis / Charley | 3 episodes |
| 1979 | The Return of the Mod Squad | Adam Greer | Television film |
| 1980 | Vega$ | Benson | Episode: "Lost Monday" |
| 1982 | Quincy, M.E. | Victor Ramsey | Episode: "Expert in Murder" |
| 1982 | Tucker's Witch | Terry Porter | Episode: "Big Mouth" |
| 1982 | Seven Brides for Seven Brothers | Merlin Palmer | Episode: "Christmas Song" |
| 1984 | Hawaiian Heat | Dan McGreedy | Episode: "Old Dues" |
| 1985 | Street Hawk | Morgan Hartmann | Episode: "Fire on the Wing" |
| 1985 | Misfits of Science | Bill | Episode: "Fumble on the One" |
| 1987 | Sledge Hammer! | Hugo Victor | Episode: "Jagged Sledge" |
| 1991 | Murder, She Wrote | Carmine Abruzzi | Episode: "Family Doctor" |
