= Mister Roberts =

Mister Roberts may refer to:

- Mister Roberts (novel), a 1946 novel by Thomas Heggen
- Mister Roberts (play), a 1948 play by Heggen and Joshua Logan
- Mister Roberts (1955 film), a film directed by John Ford, Mervyn LeRoy and Joshua Logan
- Mister Roberts (TV series), a 1965 TV series
- Mister Roberts (1984 film), a TV film originally broadcast live
