= Ensign Pulver =

1964 film by Joshua Logan

- Theatrical release poster
- Directed by: Joshua Logan
- Screenplay by: Peter S. Feibleman; Joshua Logan
- Based on: Mister Roberts by Thomas Heggen
- Produced by: Joshua Logan
- Starring: Robert Walker Jr. Burl Ives; Walter Matthau; Larry Hagman
- Cinematography: Charles Lawton Jr.
- Edited by: William H. Reynolds
- Music by: George Duning
- Distributed by: Warner Bros. Pictures
- Release date: June 24, 1964 (US)
- Running time: 104 minutes
- Country: United States
- Language: English
- Box office: est. $1,200,000 (US/ Canada)

Ensign Pulver is a 1964 American Technicolor comedy drama film in Panavision and a sequel to the 1955 film Mister Roberts. The film stars Robert Walker Jr., Burl Ives, Walter Matthau and Tommy Sands and features Millie Perkins, Larry Hagman, Kay Medford, Peter Marshall, Jack Nicholson, Richard Gautier, George Lindsey, James Farentino and James Coco.

The film is directed and co-written by Joshua Logan, who had directed and co-written the 1948 Mister Roberts stage play on Broadway, and also shot scenes for the 1955 film after director John Ford fell ill.

The story concerns the U.S.S. Reluctant, a cargo ship in the waning days of World War II that is at anchor beside a tropical island. Several of the film's events—such as attacking the Captain while he is watching a film, and one of the sailors trying to obtain compassionate leave to deal with the funeral of his child—are taken from Thomas Heggen's original 1946 novel Mister Roberts. The characters of Pulver, Doc and several crewmen return from the first film, but played by different actors.

== Plot ==
U.S. Navy Ensign Frank Pulver constantly feels unappreciated. When he purposely aims a sharp object into the hindquarters of the hated Captain Morton, the crew cannot imagine that the all-talk, no-action Pulver could be behind it. A poll to guess the identity of the "ass-sassin" results in votes for almost everyone except Pulver, which he bitterly resents.

Shipmates Billings, Insigna, Skouras and Dolan do not take Pulver seriously while despising the captain, who refuses to grant leave to seaman Bruno to attend his daughter's funeral back home. Doc is the only one aboard who believes at all in Pulver's potential.

At sea for months at a time, Pulver is unable to indulge his greatest interest, women, until a company of nurses lands on a nearby atoll. The head nurse is pleased to meet him when Pulver introduces himself as a doctor serving on a destroyer, but nurse Scotty suspects the truth, and a smitten Pulver confesses to her that he is no doctor and nothing more than a junior officer on "the worst ship in the Navy".

Bruno becomes so deranged that he attempts to kill the captain. Pulver reluctantly intervenes, but the captain falls overboard, and is about to drown until Pulver lowers a life raft and dives in to save him. Separated from their ship, with the crew unaware for hours that they are missing, Pulver and Morton bicker aboard the raft. The ensign takes notes while the delusional captain reveals dark secrets about his past. As time passes, Morton begins experiencing pains in his right abdominal region.

Eventually, the raft drifts to an island with friendly natives. Pulver also finds Scotty and Captain Zimmer on a nearby island, where their plane had crash-landed during a storm. Diagnosed with appendicitis, Morton again ends up owing his life to Pulver, who follows Doc's instructions over a radio to remove the captain's appendix. Back aboard ship, Morton's natural tendencies resurface, and he tries to return to his martinet ways. Although Pulver now has leverage against the captain, he shows genuine compassion and convinces him to leave the ship for his own well-being. Morton takes his advice and departs, turning over command to the more popular LaSeuer.

== Cast ==
- Robert Walker Jr. as Ensign Frank Pulver
- Burl Ives as Captain Morton
- Walter Matthau as Doc
- Tommy Sands as John X. Bruno
- Millie Perkins as Nurse Scotty
- Kay Medford as Head Nurse
- Larry Hagman as Billings
- Peter Marshall as Carney
- Joseph Marr as Yeoman Dowdy
- Gerald S. O'Loughlin as LaSueur
- Diana Sands as Mila
- Robert Matek as Captain Donald "Stretch" Zimmer
- Jack Nicholson as Dolan
- Al Freeman Jr. as Taru
- Richard Gautier as Stefanowski
- George Lindsey as Lindstrom
- Sal Papa as Gabrowski
- James Farentino as Insigna
- James Coco as Skouras
- Don Dorrell as Payne

Cast notes

- Gavin MacLeod has a bit part as a crewman

== Production ==
Ensign Pulver began production under the working title Mr. Pulver and the Captain. Location scenes for the film were shot in Mexico City and Acapulco, Mexico.

Actor Jack Nicholson assisted director Josh Logan with casting, becoming an informal "assistant producer". Logan, who hoped that the film would repeat the success of Mister Roberts, recognized that it had fallen short of that mark, writing in his autobiography:

We thought we had everyone in the picture that anyone could ask for ... But we had left out the most important thing: the catalytic agent, Mister Roberts. And without him, the story falls into shreds. No one really cares about the others enough to create suspense as to the outcome.

In the original film, Jack Lemmon had won an Academy Award for Best Supporting Actor for his portrayal of Ensign Pulver, James Cagney had played the Captain, William Powell was Doc, and Henry Fonda portrayed Mister Roberts.

== Reception ==
Stanley Eichelbaum of the San Francisco Examiner found the movie energetic but unfunny, with witless dialog that defeated even the more skilled actors (Walter Matthau, Burl Ives).

Bob MacKenzie of the Oakland Tribune was put off by the pranks against Burl Ives's captain and by the film's attempts to wring comedy from dramatic situations, such as the death of a serviceman's child. He found Tommy Sands, as the bereaved father, a particularly bad actor.

The New York Times critic Eugene Archer was displeased with the uniformly broad acting and tasteless deeds of the characters. He concluded his review by saying, "This is one cargo ship that belongs in dry dock."

== Paperback novelization ==
Concurrent with the release of the film, Dell Publishing issued a paperback novelization of the film by W. H. (William Henry) Manville, writing under the pseudonym he used for tie-in work: "Henry Williams".

== Comic book adaptation ==
- Dell Movie Classic: Ensign Pulver (August–October 1964)

== See also ==
- List of American films of 1964
