= Mister Roberts (1955 film) =

1955 film by John Ford and Mervyn LeRoy

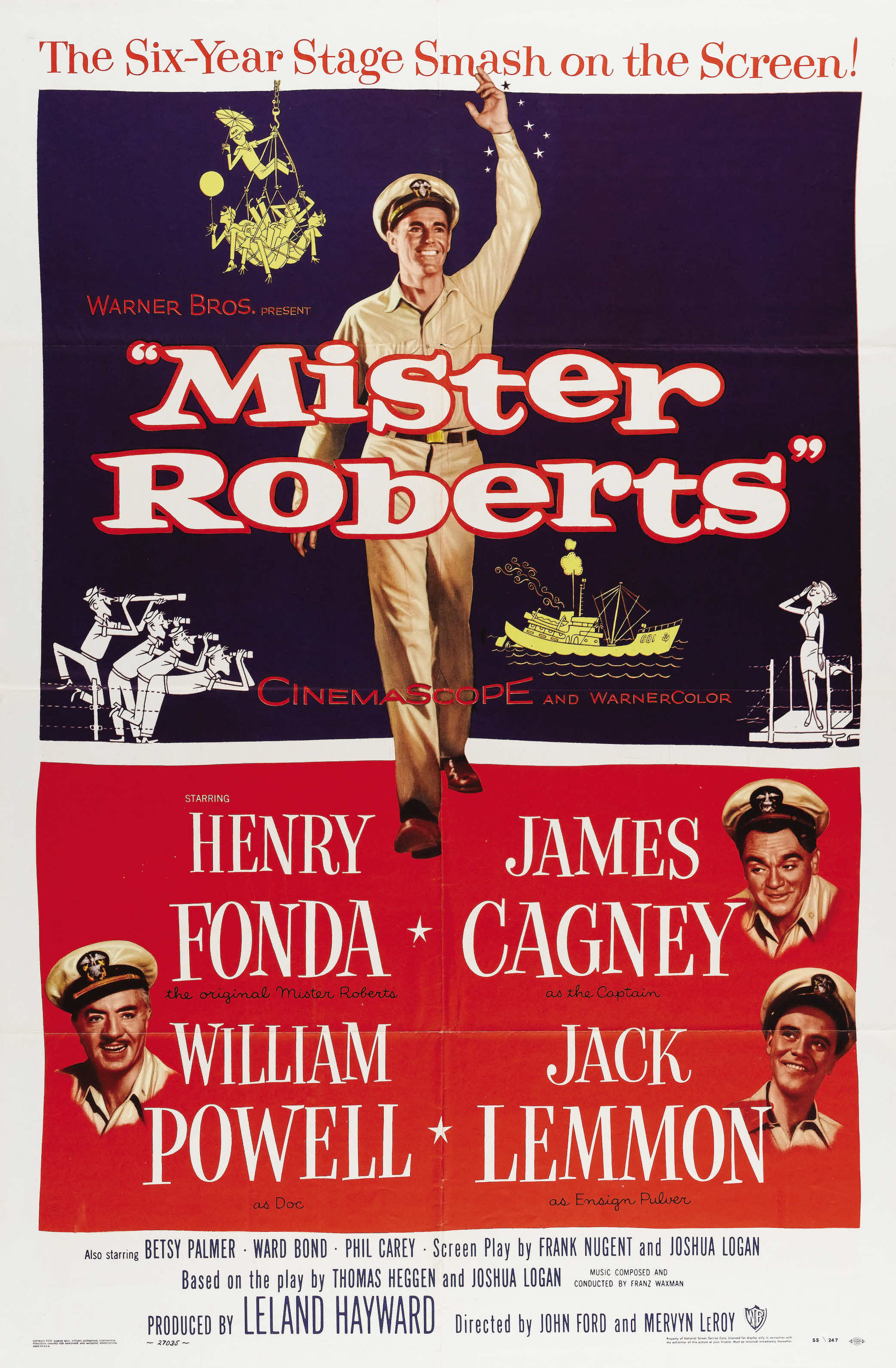
- Theatrical release poster by Bill Gold
- Directed by: John Ford; Mervyn LeRoy; Joshua Logan (uncredited)
- Screenplay by: Frank S. Nugent; Joshua Logan
- Based on: Mister Roberts (1946 novel) by Thomas Heggen; Mister Roberts (1948 play) by Thomas Heggen; Joshua Logan
- Produced by: Leland Hayward
- Starring: Henry Fonda; James Cagney; William Powell; Jack Lemmon
- Cinematography: Winton C. Hoch
- Edited by: Jack Murray
- Music by: Franz Waxman
- Distributed by: Warner Bros. Pictures
- Release date: July 30, 1955
- Running time: 120, 123, or 120–121, 123 or 126 minutes
- Country: United States
- Language: English
- Budget: $2.3 million
- Box office: $21.2 million

Mister Roberts is a 1955 American comedy-drama film directed by John Ford and Mervyn LeRoy featuring an all-star cast including Henry Fonda as Mister Roberts, James Cagney as Captain Morton, William Powell (in his final film appearance) as Doc, and Jack Lemmon as Ensign Pulver. Based on the 1946 novel and 1948 Broadway play, the film was nominated for three Academy Awards, including Best Picture, Best Sound, and Best Supporting Actor, with Lemmon winning the last.

== Plot ==
In the waning days of World War II, the United States Navy cargo ship Reluctant operates in areas of the Pacific Ocean far from enemy action. Lt. (j.g.) Doug Roberts, the executive officer and cargo chief, shields the dispirited crew from their tyrannical captain, Lt Cdr. Morton. Morton takes pride in his status, symbolized by a palm tree on the foredeck, given to him for the ship's past success in cargo supply. Roberts shares quarters with Ensign Frank Thurlowe Pulver, the laundry and morale officer. Pulver is intimidated by the captain, and avoids him so completely that Morton is initially unaware that Pulver is a crew member. Pulver's grandiose ideas on pranking the captain never successfully materialize. Eager to join the fighting, Roberts repeatedly requests a transfer, but Morton's refusal to endorse his requests results in them being rejected.

Roberts surreptitiously requests and is granted crew liberty from one of Morton's superiors, a port captain who wishes to reward the Reluctant's crew for meeting a difficult resupply schedule. When the ship reaches an idyllic South Pacific island, however, Morton cancels the crew's shore leave. In private, Morton tells Roberts that his transfer requests and reports of low crew morale are hurting Morton's chance of promotion and that the crew will be denied leave unless Roberts submits fully to Morton's command style, ceases to request a transfer, and never tells the crew why. Roberts acquiesces, and the crew is granted liberty. The ship is kicked out of port after the crew's raucous liberty and the angry captain, in reprimanding the crew, prods Roberts to back him.

The crew is mystified by Roberts' new strictness and deference to the captain. Morton convinces them that Roberts is vying for a promotion. When a crew member informs Roberts of a new Navy policy which could help him receive a transfer despite the captain's opposition, Roberts declines.

News of the Allied victory in Europe depresses Roberts further, as the war may end soon without his ever seeing combat, and Roberts tosses Morton's prized palm tree overboard. Morton eventually realizes Roberts is the likely culprit and summons him to his quarters and accuses him of the deed. An open microphone allows the crew to overhear their heated conversation and why Roberts changed.

Weeks later, Roberts receives an unexpected transfer. 'Doc,' the ship's doctor and Roberts' friend, confides to him that the crew risked court-martial by submitting a transfer request with Morton's forged signature of approval. Before he leaves, the crew present Roberts with a handmade medal, the Order of the Palm, for "action against the enemy".

Several weeks later, Pulver, who has been appointed cargo officer, receives several letters. The first is from Roberts, enthusiastic about his new assignment aboard the destroyer USS Livingston during the Battle of Okinawa. The second letter is from Pulver's college friend, Fornell, also assigned to the Livingston, which reveals that Roberts was killed in a kamikaze attack shortly after the first letter had been posted. No longer afraid, Pulver throws the captain's replacement palm tree overboard, marches into Morton's cabin, and claims responsibility. Morton realizes his problems have not gone away.

== Cast ==
- Henry Fonda as Lieutenant Junior Grade Douglas Roberts (in the book, Roberts is a full lieutenant, not a j.g.)
- James Cagney as Lieutenant Commander "Captain" Morton
- William Powell as "Doc"
- Jack Lemmon as Ensign Frank Thurlowe Pulver
- Betsy Palmer as Lieutenant Ann Girard
- Ward Bond as Chief Petty Officer Dowdy
- Ken Curtis as Dolan
- Philip Carey as Mannion (billed as Phil Carey)
- Nick Adams as Reber
- Perry Lopez as Rodrigues
- Robert Roark as Insigna
- Harry Carey Jr. as Stefanowski
- Patrick Wayne as Bookser
- Frank Aletter as Gerhart
- Tige Andrews as Wiley
- Martin Milner as Shore Patrol Officer
- Harry Tenbrook as "Cookie"
- Kathleen O'Malley as Nurse
- Gregory Walcott as Shore Patrolman
- James Flavin as Military Policeman
- Jack Pennick as Marine Sergeant
- Duke Kahanamoku as Native Chief

== Production ==
The film was originally planned to be made in 3-D but Warner Bros. Pictures later announced that it was to be made in WarnerSuperScope instead using Warner's new All-Media camera with no mention of 3-D. It was eventually released in CinemaScope.

Fonda was not the original choice to star in the film version; Warner Bros. was considering William Holden or Marlon Brando for the role. The studio thought Fonda had been on stage and off the screen so long (seven years) that he was no longer a box office draw. In addition, when filming began he was 49, much older than the average lieutenant junior grade. Fonda was hired only because director John Ford insisted.

The movie was directed by John Ford, Mervyn LeRoy and Joshua Logan, who was uncredited. While directing the film, Ford had personality conflicts with Fonda and Cagney. When Ford met Cagney at the airport, the director warned that they would "tangle asses," which caught Cagney by surprise. Cagney later said, "I would have kicked his brains out. He was so goddamned mean to everybody. He was truly a nasty old man." The next day, Cagney was slightly late on set, and Ford became incensed. Cagney cut short the imminent tirade, saying, "When I started this picture, you said that we would tangle asses before this was over. I'm ready now – are you?" Ford backed down and walked away, and he and Cagney had no further conflicts on the set.

Nevertheless, Ford was replaced by LeRoy after difficulties with Fonda (Ford apparently punched Fonda in the jaw during a heated argument), and a gall bladder problem that necessitated emergency surgery. It has been widely speculated which scenes were directed by LeRoy. Jack Lemmon shed some light on this issue in his DVD commentary: "Mervyn LeRoy would watch all of the rushes that Ford had shot prior to his temporary departure and decided to shoot them the way John Ford would have shot 'em." Logan, who had directed the original stage production in which Fonda starred, re-shot major portions of the film, at Fonda's request.

The DVD release of this film includes an audio commentary by Lemmon in which he recounts stories of his experience making the film and his views on acting. During the production of the film, Lemmon began a long-term friendship with Cagney which continued until Cagney's death in 1986. Prior to his appearance in his first film, years before Mister Roberts, he started in live television. In one particular performance, Lemmon decided to play his character differently. He decided to play the character left-handed, which was opposite to his own handedness. With much practice, he pulled off the performance without anyone noticing the change. Even Lemmon's wife was fooled. A few years later, Lemmon met Cagney on their way to Midway Island to film Mister Roberts. Cagney asked, "Are you still fooling people into believing you're left-handed?" They had a great laugh and a strong friendship was born.

Fonda, in his 1982 autobiography, My Life, praised the movie but said he believed the play was even better. Mister Roberts was William Powell's final film and final acting appearance, although he lived nearly another 30 years, dying at age 91 in 1984. The film was James Cagney's last movie for Warner Bros., the studio that had propelled him to stardom in the 1930s and under which he had spent the majority of his career under contract.

== USS Reluctant ==
The Navy vessel that played the role of USS Reluctant (AK-601), a.k.a. "the Bucket," in the movie's exterior shots was a former U.S. Army Freight and Passenger/Freight and Supply (FP/FS) vessel, which was originally commissioned in the Navy following World War II. The USS Hewell (AG-145) is credited by the Navy as the ship assigned to the filming. The official Navy history for the ship notes:

In late August 1954 Hewell departed Hawaii for Midway Island, mooring at the Naval Base there on 28 August to help film the Warner Brothers movie Mister Roberts. The film, starring Henry Fonda, James Cagney, William Powell and Jack Lemmon, was partially shot on board Hewell, with underway footage filmed off Midway Harbor between 1 and 16 September. The light cargo ship then sailed back to Hawaii between 24 and 29 September and additional film was shot off Kaneohe Bay between 30 September and 7 October.

A 1994 article which appeared in the newsletter of the Keyport, Washington Naval Undersea Warfare Center, contending that IX-308 (another Army FS vessel converted to a Navy AKL (light auxiliary cargo) and assigned torpedo recovery duties at Keyport) was used in filming of Mister Roberts and not Hewell, created a controversy. That ship had been named USNS New Bedford for its service out of that port serving the USAF Texas Towers radar facilities off the east coast of the United States.

All but one of the Navy's AKLs were built as U.S. Army FP/FS type cargo vessels transferred to the Navy. As it was, an AKL carried a much smaller crew than the USS Virgo (AKA-20) and USS Rotanin (AK-108), both of which Thomas Heggen served on during the war. In the movie, Mr. Roberts says to Doc that there are "62 men" aboard which would have been far too many for an AKL.

A number of modifications to the AKL exterior appearance were made for the film. The "palm tree" was located on a "deck" built for the movie by extending the small deckhouse of the AKL and building movie set ladders to the bridge and main deck. The crew, when going below to their berthing compartment, are shown in the movie to be descending into the cargo hold.

== Reception ==
The film was a financial success. It grossed $21.2 million, earning $8.5 million in US theatrical rentals.

The February 2020 issue of New York Magazine lists Mister Roberts as among "The Best Movies That Lost Best Picture at the Oscars."

== Awards and nominations ==
Award	Category	Nominee(s)	Result	Ref.
Academy Awards	Best Motion Picture	Leland Hayward	Nominated	
Academy Awards	Best Supporting Actor	Jack Lemmon	Won	
Academy Awards	Best Sound Recording	William A. Mueller	Nominated	
British Academy Film Awards	Best Foreign Actor	Jack Lemmon	Nominated	
National Board of Review Awards	Top Ten Films		3rd Place	
Writers Guild of America Awards	Best Written American Comedy	Frank S. Nugent and Joshua Logan	Won	

== Television and sequels ==
Mister Roberts was followed by a film sequel, Ensign Pulver (1964), with Robert Walker Jr. starring as Pulver. It also starred Burl Ives as Captain Morton, Walter Matthau as Doc, and in small roles, Larry Hagman and Jack Nicholson, among others. Much of the screenplay was derived from Heggen's original book.

The original film was the basis of the 1965 TV series Mister Roberts, which lasted one season, and the film was remade for television in 1984 as a live telecast shot mostly in the form of a stage play.
