= USS Virgo =

Cargo ship of the United States Navy

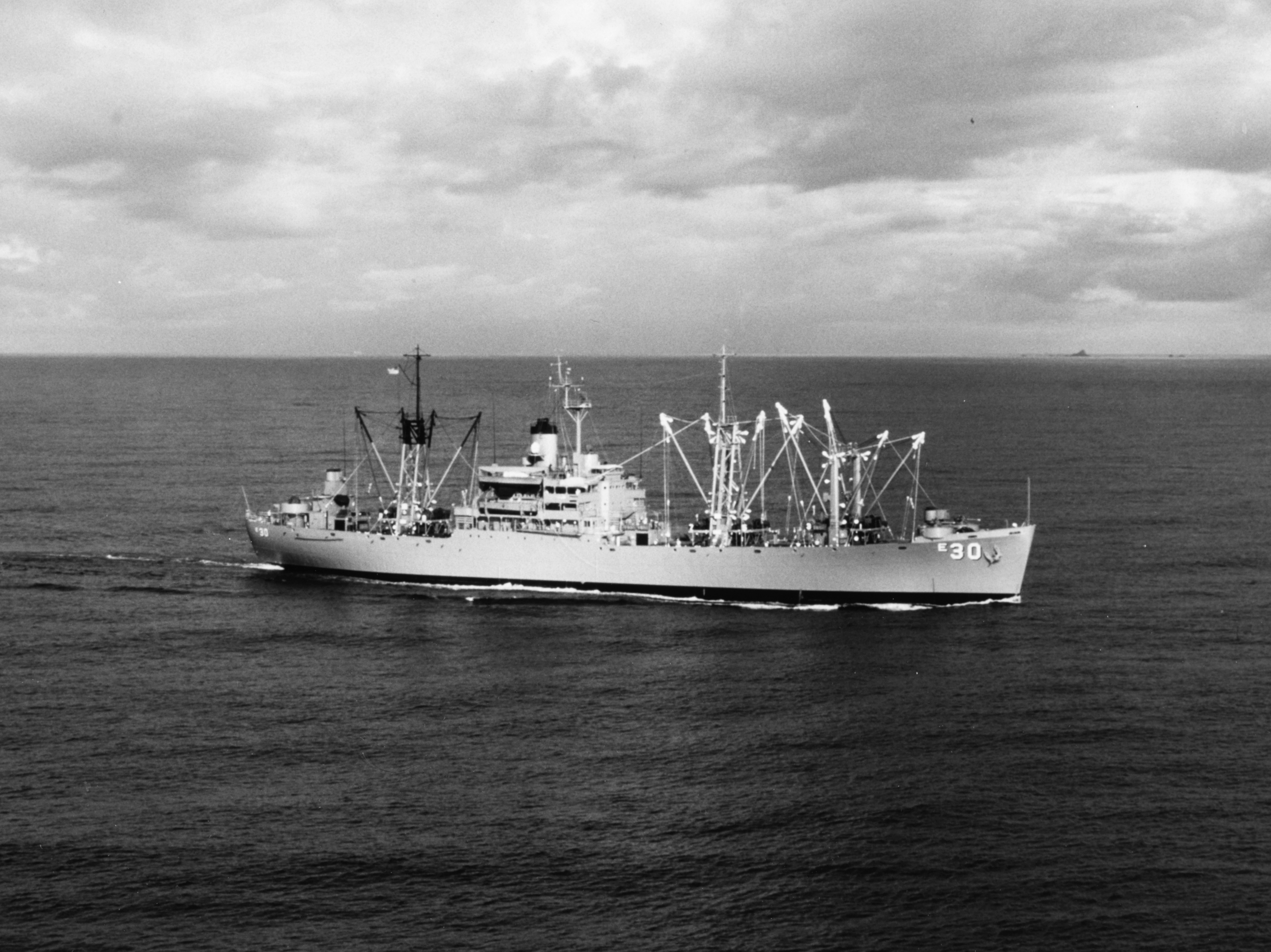
- USS Virgo (AE-30) underway in Subic Bay in 1970

History

United States
- Name: USS Virgo
- Namesake: The constellation Virgo
- Builder: Federal Shipbuilding and Drydock Company, Kearny, New Jersey
- Laid down: 9 March 1943
- Launched: 4 June 1943
- Commissioned: 16 July 1943
- Decommissioned: 1 July 1961
- Recommissioned: 19 August 1966
- Decommissioned: 18 February 1971
- Reclassified: AE-30, 1 November 1965
- Stricken: 18 February 1971
- Honors and awards: 7 battle stars (World War II); 9 battle stars (Korea); 10 campaign stars (Vietnam)
- Fate: Sold for scrapping, 19 November 1973

General characteristics
- Class & type: Andromeda-class attack cargo ship
- Displacement: 13,910 long tons (14,133 t) full load
- Length: 459 ft 3 in (139.98 m)
- Beam: 63 ft (19 m)
- Draft: 26 ft 4 in (8.03 m)
- Speed: 16.5 knots (30.6 km/h; 19.0 mph)
- Complement: 473
- Armament: 1 × 5"/38 caliber dual purpose gun; 4 × 3 in (76 mm) guns

USS Virgo (AKA-20) was an Andromeda class attack cargo ship of the United States Navy, named after the constellation Virgo. She was later converted to an ammunition ship and redesignated as (AE-30). She served as a commissioned ship for 22 years and 4 months.

Virgo (AKA-20) was laid down on 9 March 1943 at Kearny, New Jersey, by the Federal Shipbuilding and Drydock Company, under a Maritime Commission contract (MC hull 204); launched on 4 June 1943; sponsored by Miss Sharman Douglas; delivered to the Navy on 15 July 1943; and commissioned at the New York Navy Yard on 16 July 1943.

== Service history ==
=== World War II ===
==== 1943 ====
Virgo conducted her shakedown training in the Chesapeake Bay and off the Virginia Capes in July and August and then departed Norfolk on 24 August, bound for the Pacific. She transited the Panama Canal on 31 August and arrived in San Diego, California, on 9 September. On the 15th, she continued her voyage west. The attack cargo ship entered Pearl Harbor on 21 September and began cargo operations – unloading some and taking on more. Virgo stood out of Pearl Harbor on 24 September and set a course for New Zealand. She arrived in Wellington on 6 October and began a series of landing craft exercises. The ship remained at Wellington until 1 November at which time she got underway for the New Hebrides Islands. She arrived in Hayannah Harbor at the island of Efate to conduct training and make preparations for the forthcoming Gilberts and Marshalls invasions.

Virgo departed the New Hebrides on 13 November in company with a convoy bound for the Gilbert Islands. She arrived off Tarawa Atoll early on the morning of the 20th. While preparing to land marines on Betio Island, Virgo was straddled by four shells from a Japanese shore battery. However, air strikes and counter battery fire quickly silenced the offender, and Virgo resumed landing operations. She remained offshore while the Marines carried out their bloody struggle to wrest control of the atoll from a well-fortified enemy. During that struggle and while the other islands of the atoll were cleared, Virgo remained in the vicinity of Tarawa. On 28 November, she cleared the Gilberts on her way to Hawaii. The attack cargo ship arrived in Pearl Harbor on 7 December. During the following six weeks, she practiced amphibious operations in the Hawaiian Islands in preparation for "Operation Flintlock", the assault and occupation of atolls in the Marshall Islands.

==== 1944 ====
On 22 January 1944, Virgo departed Oahu in company with Task Force (TF) 52, bound for the Marshalls. She arrived off Kwajalein Atoll early on the morning of 31 January and began launching boats and discharging troops. No untoward events occurred during her five-day stay at Kwajalein, and she departed the atoll on 4 February. The attack cargo ship arrived at Funafuti in the Ellice Islands on 8 February and remained there until the 19th when she got underway for Guadalcanal. The ship anchored in Port Purvis on Florida Island in the Solomons on 24 February and began a series of amphibious training exercises in the southern Solomons.

That employment lasted until 27 March, on which day she got underway for Bougainville in the northern Solomons with elements of the Army's 25th Regimental Combat Team (RCT). She discharged those troops and their attending equipment at Bougainville on 28 March and departed that same day for New Guinea. Virgo entered Milne Bay, New Guinea, on 31 March and remained there until 4 April when she headed for Cape Sudest. The ship stopped at Cape Sudest from 5 to 14 April and then headed for the Beli Beli Islands. She reached that destination on the 15th and began loading elements of the Army's 24th RCT. Underway again on the 16th, Virgo set a course for Tanahmerah Bay, New Guinea, where she arrived on 23 April. She unloaded the troops and their equipment and departed Tanahmerah Bay on the 24th. She stopped at Cape Sudest on the 27th and arrived at Saidor on the 29th. There, she loaded men and equipment of the Army's 32nd Infantry Division. On 1 May, the ship put to sea once again, bound for Aitape, New Guinea, where she arrived on the 3rd and unloaded troops and equipment. Departing Aitape that same day, Virgo set a course via Cape Sudest for Guadalcanal where she arrived on 10 May. At Guadalcanal, the attack cargo ship loaded troops of the 1st Marine Provisional Brigade and began amphibious training exercises which lasted until 31 May.

On 4 June, she departed Guadalcanal with troops embarked for the invasion of the Mariana Islands. She stopped at Kwajalein from 9 to 11 June and then put to sea once again on the 12th. Virgo's troops were not committed to 15 June landings on Saipan. Instead, they made up a part of the floating reserve and were scheduled to land on Guam later in the month. However, Saipan proved to be a tougher nut to crack than expected; and, as a consequence, the Guam assault was delayed. After steaming around to the east of Saipan for several days – during which the 5th Fleet carriers destroyed the remnants of Japanese naval air power in the Battle of the Philippine Sea — she then put in at Eniwetok Atoll on 30 June to await reinforcements for the delayed invasion of Guam. The ship rode at anchor in Eniwetok until 17 July when she returned to sea and set a course back to the Marianas. On the 21st, she arrived off Guam, and her troops landed near Orote Peninsula. The attack cargo ship remained off Agat Bay until 27 July at which time she took leave of the Marianas on her way – via Eniwetok – to Espiritu Santo in the New Hebrides.

The ship arrived at Espiritu Santo on 6 August and, for the next month, conducted amphibious training there and at Guadalcanal. On 8 September, Virgo left Guadalcanal and shaped a course for the Palau Islands. She arrived off Peleliu Island early on the morning of 15 September, and her embarked troops stormed ashore at about 0830. She remained in the Palaus for almost a month supporting the troops in their difficult battle to subdue the Peleliu garrison. On 3 October, she departed the Palau Islands to return to Guadalcanal via the Russell Islands. She arrived at her destination on 12 October. The following day, the ship received orders to return to the United States and got underway almost immediately. After a non-stop voyage, Virgo arrived in San Francisco, California, on 29 October and, soon thereafter, began a two-month overhaul at the Hunters Point Navy Yard.

==== 1945–1946 ====
The attack cargo ship stood out of San Francisco on 4 January 1945 to return to the western Pacific. She stopped at Pearl Harbor from 10 to 28 January before continuing her voyage west. Along the way, Virgo also made a visit to Eniwetok before arriving in Ulithi on 13 February where she reported for duty with Service Squadron (ServRon) 10. Her tour of duty with ServRon 10 brought a change in mission for the ship. No longer did she serve as an assault cargo carrier engaged in amphibious operations. From that point forward, the attack cargo ship served as a straight cargo carrier. In that role, she supported the Iwo Jima operation in February by replenishing warships at sea. In April and May, Virgo performed similar services in support of the Okinawa campaign. In May, she began a return voyage to the United States, departing Okinawa on 15 May. En route, she made stops at Ulithi and at Pearl Harbor before arriving in San Francisco on 20 June. After a month in overhaul at Moore's Shipyard, Virgo headed back to the western Pacific on 3 August. However, she did not resume warlike activities because hostilities ceased on 15 August, four days before she arrived in the lagoon at Ulithi. The next day, she returned to sea with Task Group (TG) 30.8 to provision the ships of the 3rd Fleet in Japanese waters. Finishing that mission early in September, Virgo arrived in Tokyo Bay on the 9th, a week after the formal surrender. She served as station store ship at Yokosuka for the occupation forces until 10 April 1946 at which time she headed back to the United States. The ship arrived in San Francisco on 14 May and began overhaul at the San Francisco Naval Shipyard.

She completed repairs in August and, on the 21st, began a series of voyages from the west coast to American bases in the Far East. She carried provisions and stores to bases in the Philippines, in the Marianas, in Japan, and in China. She also made side trips to Okinawa, the Admiralty Islands, and Korea. That routine lasted until the latter half of 1949. In October 1949, she began an overhaul at the Puget Sound Naval Shipyard which lasted until the beginning of 1950.

=== Korea ===
==== 1950 ====
Between 7 February and 31 March 1950, the attack cargo ship made a round-trip voyage from Oakland to Guam and back to San Diego. On 25 April, she departed San Diego for a voyage to the east coast of the United States. During that voyage, she transited the Panama Canal and visited both Bayonne, New Jersey, and Norfolk, Virginia. She returned to the west coast via the Panama Canal once more and arrived back in San Diego on 17 July.

While Virgo visited the east coast, conflict broke out in the Far East once again. On 25 June, troops of communist North Korea invaded the Republic of Korea (ROK) to the south. The United States, and later the United Nations, responded with support for South Korea against the aggressors. Thus, Virgo soon found herself supporting combat forces once more. On 19 August, she departed Port Chicago, California, with Navy passengers embarked and with a load of ammunition, bound ultimately for Korea. She stopped at Sasebo, Japan, from 6 to 15 September and then headed for Inchon, Korea. She arrived at Inchon on the 16th, the day following the amphibious landing carried out there. She remained in the Korean war zone, first at Inchon and later at Jinsen Ko, for about three weeks. During that time, the attack cargo ship provisioned minesweepers, a Canadian destroyer, an American destroyer and supplied ammunition to the troops ashore. She departed Korea on 7 October and returned to Japan where she visited Sasebo and Yokosuka before heading back to the United States on 1 November. After a stop at Pearl Harbor, the ship arrived in San Francisco on 19 November and began repairs at the Pacific Repair Co.

==== 1951 ====
On 19 January 1951, Virgo departed San Francisco for her second tour of duty in the Korean combat zone. She arrived in Sasebo on 6 February to disembark passengers and unload ammunition. From Sasebo, the ship moved to Yokosuka at mid-month; and, from there, she headed for Korea. The attack cargo ship entered port at Pusan on 15 March but soon returned to sea to transfer ammunition to Valley Forge (CV-45) and to Juneau (CL-119). Following that, she returned to Sasebo for several days on the 19th. At the end of the month, she resumed ammunition resupply duty along the Korean coast, visiting Songjin, Wonsan, Suyeong, and Pohang as well as replenishing ships at sea between port calls. She returned to Sasebo on 7 May and remained there until the 29th when she got underway to return to the United States. On 13 June, the attack cargo ship entered port at Long Beach California, and began overhaul at the Long Beach Naval Shipyard. She completed repairs in August and, after refresher training out of San Diego, loaded passengers and ammunition at Port Chicago, California in late September. On 5 October, she put to sea to return to the Far East. The ship arrived in Sasebo on 22 October, disembarked her passengers, and unloaded some ammunition before getting underway for the war zone once more.

==== 1952 ====
During her tour of duty, her mission consisted entirely of replenishments at sea in support of United Nations naval forces operating off the Korean coast. That assignment lasted until 12 August 1952 at which time she departed Yokosuka for home. She stopped at Pearl Harbor along the way and arrived in San Francisco on the 25th. Virgo then began an availability at the Triple "A" Machine Shop in San Francisco. Virgo completed repairs in October and departed San Francisco on 1 November to resume duty in the Orient. She arrived in Sasebo on 19 November and remained there almost two months.

==== 1953 ====
On 3 January 1953, the ship stood out of Sasebo, bound for Korean waters. For the next five months, she resumed the familiar schedule of replenishments at sea punctuated by ammunition deliveries at Korean ports and return trips to Sasebo for the purpose of restocking her own supplies. She completed her last mission early in June and, on the 13th, headed back to the United States. She reentered San Francisco on 28 June and entered the Mare Island Naval Shipyard for a three-month overhaul. While she underwent repairs, hostilities in Korea effectively ceased with the signing of an armistice on 19 July 1953. Thus, when she emerged from the shipyard late in September and prepared to resume voyages to the Far East, her missions lost their combat character.

=== Pacific, 1953–1961 ===
Over the next five years, she continued to make voyages between the west coast and American bases in the Far East. Most frequently, she called at such ports as Sasebo and Yokosuka in Japan, Kaohsiung on the island of Taiwan, and Manila and Subic Bay in the Philippines. Less frequently, she stopped at the Japanese ports of Kure and Kobe, at Okinawa, Guam, and Hong Kong. At the end of that five years, on 3 April 1958, Virgo was decommissioned and berthed with the Columbia River Group, Pacific Reserve Fleet, located at Astoria, Oregon On 1 July 1961, her name was stricken from the Navy list; and she was transferred to the custody of the Maritime Administration. She was berthed with the National Defense Reserve Fleet located also at Astoria.

=== Vietnam ===
==== 1965–1968 ====
In September 1965, the Navy reactivated the Virgo and her name was reinstated on the Navy list. On 1 November 1965, she was reclassified as an ammunition ship and redesignated AE-30. After almost a year of repairs and rehabilitation, Virgo (AE-30) was recommissioned at Seattle, Washington, on 19 August 1966. She spent the remainder of 1966 engaged in shakedown training and independent ship's exercises along the west coast. In January 1967, she loaded ammunition at Concord Naval Weapons Station, California, in preparation for her first deployment to the western Pacific in support of the American effort in the Vietnam War. She departed Concord on 12 January and arrived in Subic Bay on 6 February. There, she unloaded a part of her cargo before departing the Philippines on the 12th for replenishment missions in the Gulf of Tonkin. During the following six months, the ship made an equal number of replenishment voyages from Subic Bay to the warships operating in the Gulf of Tonkin to keep them supplied with ammunition. She punctuated those assignments with liberty calls at Subic Bay and at Hong Kong. Virgo headed back to the United States on 22 August. Almost a month later, on 21 September, she moored at the Concord Naval Weapons Station, California. She spent the remainder of the year engaged in normal operations out of her base at Concord.

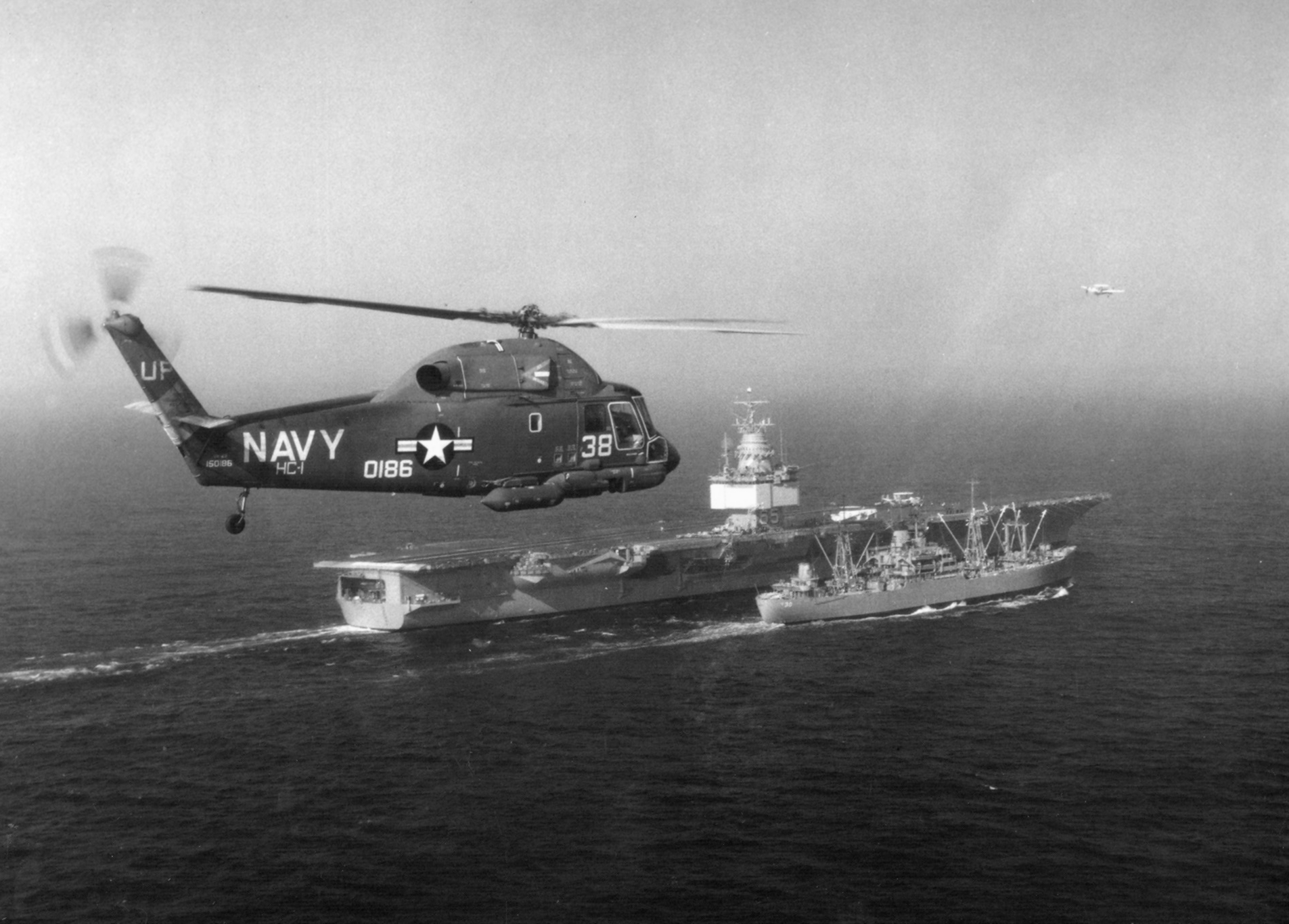
USS Virgo replenishing USS Enterprise in 1966

During the first six weeks of 1968, Virgo loaded ammunition in preparation for and participation in the 1st Fleet exercise, Operation "Bead Stringer." In mid-February, she loaded ammunition for her second deployment to the western Pacific during the Vietnam War. On 26 February, she began her voyage west. The ship changed operational control to the 7th Fleet on 7 March and arrived in Subic Bay 12 days later. Once again, her assignment fell into a pattern of replenishment voyages to the ships operating in the Gulf of Tonkin. In six months' time, she made eight line swings from Subic Bay to the Gulf bringing in new stocks of ammunition to refill the depleted magazines of American warships along the Vietnamese coast. She finished her last such mission early in October and returned to Subic Bay on the 10th. From there, she moved to Sasebo, Japan, for a four-day liberty call before getting underway for the United States on 23 October. The ammunition ship arrived back in Concord on 11 November, offloaded ammunition, and entered the Mare Island Naval Shipyard to begin post-deployment standdown. On 19 December, she moved to the Triple "A" shipyard to begin a six-week restricted availability.

==== 1969–1973 ====
Her repair period continued until the end of January 1969. On the 31st, she loaded ammunition at Concord in preparation for operations at sea with units of the 1st Fleet. Those missions – primarily to train new crew members – lasted until the beginning of April. After final loadout at Concord, she got underway for the Far East on 19 April. She arrived in Subic Bay on 14 May and, after two weeks of voyage repairs, began the familiar series of voyages between Subic Bay and Vietnamese waters to resupply 7th Fleet ships with ammunition. However, the increasing use of the fast combat support ship (AOE), which combined the features of both ammunition ship and oiler, relegated her to a reduced role.

During most of her eight line swings, Virgo either served as a backup for the AOE's or concentrated on replenishing the cruisers and destroyers operating close to the coast. The ship completed her eighth and final line period on 12 November and returned to Subic Bay on the 14th. On the 19th, Virgo got underway for Sasebo where she remained from the 23rd to the 26th. On the latter day, she departed Sasebo and shaped a course for home. The ship arrived back in Concord on 13 December and began post-deployment leave and upkeep.

Stand down continued into January 1970. On 21 January, she began a restricted availability at the Bethlehem Steel shipyard located in San Francisco. Repairs complete on 16 February, Virgo moved back to Concord to load ammunition in preparation for operations at sea along the west coast. Refresher and type training occupied her time until 7 May at which time she departed San Francisco for the last western Pacific deployment of her Navy career. Virgo arrived in Subic Bay on 29 May and embarked upon the first of six line periods supplying ammunition to warships off Vietnam. She completed her final line swing early in November and, after a stop at Sasebo, she got underway for home on 27 November. She arrived back at Concord on 12 December and began preparations for decommissioning. Virgo was decommissioned at Vallejo, California, on 18 February 1971, and her name was once again stricken from the Navy List. Subsequently, transferred to the Maritime Administration for disposal, she was sold on 19 November 1973 to Taipei Hsieh, of Taiwan, for scrapping.

== Awards ==
Virgo earned seven battle stars during World War II, nine battle stars for Korean War service, and 10 battle stars for service during the Vietnam War.

== Specifications as of 1945 ==
In 1945, the commanding officer wrote the following description of the USS Virgo to the Secretary of the Navy:

The U.S.S. VIRGO (AKA-20) was built by the Federal Shipbuilding Company, at Kearney, New Jersey, in the winter and spring 1943. It was originally designed for use in the U.S. Maritime Service, but was taken over by the Navy for use as an amphibious cargo attack ship. She is a medium-sized cargo vessel having certain bulkheads and much equipment of a military nature added.

The general characteristics of the U.S.S. VIRGO are as follows:

| OVERALL LENGTH | 459' 2½" |
| BEAM | 63' 2½" |
| LIGHT DRAFT (Fore & Aft) | 12' 11¾" |
| MAXIMUM DRAFT | 25' 9¾" |

The ship is divided into five holds, each hold serviced by two booms, one thirty ton boom and one ten ton boom, with the exception of #1 hold which has two ten ton booms. The total useful cargo capacity after conversion being about 350,000 cu. ft.

The ship has a full speed of 17 knots (95 RPM) and a cruising speed of 15.5 knots (87 RPM). Fuel consumption at full speed is 575 gallons per hour and at standard speed, 420 gallons per hour. Her fuel capacity is 436,000 gallons fuel oil, 28,754 gallons diesel fuel and 3,000 gallons lube oil. The fresh water capacity of the ship total's 158,920 gallons with 6,857 gallons for boiler food. Her cruising range at cruising speed of 15.5 knots is 10,367 miles.

The ship is single screwed, steam turbine (double reduction) driven, made by DeLaval and is rated at 6000 HP. There are two boilers made by the Combustion Engineering Corp. with working pressure of 450 pounds, 750° superheat.

The electricity for the ship's use is furnished by two General Electric 300 KW, 120-240 V-DC generators and one Ideal Electric 300 KW, 120-240 V-DC generator. For emergency use there is one diesel driven 60 KW, 120-240 V-DC generator. The steering engine is electric hydraulic made by Hydo Windlass. The refrigerating system is composed of five, four ton York compressors and is freon type.

The evaporator is of the low pressure double effect type with a 12,000 gallon capacity.

US Government National Archives - USS Virgo Ship History

== Popular culture ==
Thomas Heggen served on board the Virgo and wrote the novel Mister Roberts. Heggen based his novel on his experiences aboard the USS Virgo and the USS Rotanin (AK-108) in the South Pacific during World War II, and began the book as a collection of short stories. It was subsequently adapted as a Tony Award-winning play, an Academy Award-winning feature film, a television series, and a television movie.

One of the novel's plot devices was a palm tree that is covertly thrown overboard by one of the crew, infuriating the captain. Another was the ship's constant voyaging between out of the way ports with no opportunity for the crew to hit a liberty port, which reflected Virgo's service through much of World War II.
