= Eleanor Phelps =

American actress

- Phelps in the play We, the People, 1933
- Born: September 8, 1907; Baltimore, Maryland, U.S.
- Died: September 29, 2001 (aged 94); New York City, New York, U.S.
- Occupation: Actress
- Years active: 1928–1989

Eleanor Phelps (September 8, 1907 – September 29, 2001) was an American theater, film, radio, and television actress. She appeared in 17 Broadway theater productions.

Before going off to Vassar for college, Phelps attended Bryn Mawr School in Baltimore along with future actresses Margaret Barker and Mildred Natwick. In college she was a student of Hallie Flanagan at the Vassar Experimental Theatre and aspired to become a Broadway performer. Her father opposed her desire to appear on stage but her mom assisted her by introducing her to actor George Arliss. She visited Arliss at his elegant Beekman Place (Manhattan) apartment and he also tried to discourage Phelps from acting.

She joined the University Players Guild for its first season of summer stock in West Falmouth on Cape Cod in 1928 along with Henry Fonda, Joshua Logan, Bretaigne Windust, Charles Leatherbee, Myron McCormick, Kent Smith, and others. On July 29, 1928, Broadway producer Winthrop Ames traveled from New York to Cape Cod specifically to see Phelps in the dress rehearsal for the University Players production of The Jest, a 1919 Broadway comedy by Sem Benelli. Perhaps his trip was occasioned at the suggestion of George Arliss who had starred as Shylock in Ames's Broadway production of Shakespeare's The Merchant of Venice during the Broadway season just ended. In any event, Ames offered Phelps the role of Jessica in the post-Broadway national tour of Merchant of Venice. At the end of the University Players 1928 summer season, Phelps left Cape Cod to join Arliss and company and never returned to Falmouth. She loved more than anything being in a play by Mister Shakespeare.

Phelps appeared in motion pictures in the early 1930s with roles in The Run Around (1932), The Count of Monte Cristo (1934), and Cleopatra (1934).

She believed that some of the best acting was in soap operas. On radio, Phelps starred in Life and Love of Dr. Susan on CBS beginning February 13, 1939. The story dealt with "the career of a young widow who decides to carry on her medical research after the death of her husband." Phelps participated in both soaps and made-for-television productions. Among these are Cinderella (1957), Hallmark Hall of Fame (1961), The Catholic Hour (1967), The Secret Storm (1954), Somerset (1975), Threesome (1984), and Kate & Allie (1989). She played a very rich lady, Grace Tyrrell, on The Secret Storm, from 1970 to 1973. She once did a commercial for Hershey in which she played an elegant lady getting in an elevator with a cow.

Among her passions was Latin America and wearing the bright colors and Aztec designs which reflected her interest.

== Personal life ==
Phelps married actor Alden Chase, but the marriage was annulled in October 1935.

== Death ==
Phelps died in September 2001 in New York City.

== Filmography ==
Year	Title	Role	Notes
1934	The Count of Monte Cristo	Haydee	
1934	Cleopatra	Charmion	
1982	A Stranger Is Watching	Glenda Perry	

== See also ==
- The Shopping Bag Lady
