= Mister Roberts (1984 film) =

NBC military dramedy

- Genre: Comedy; Drama
- Created by: Thomas Heggen
- Based on: Mister Roberts by Joshua Logan
- Directed by: Melvin Bernhardt
- Starring: Robert Hays; Kevin Bacon; Raye Birk; Charles Durning; Marilu Henner; Howard Hesseman; Peter Jason; Charles Lang; Christopher Murray; Joe Pantoliano
- Country of origin: United States
- Original language: English

Production
- Executive producers: David Rintels; Jacqueline Tone
- Producer: Paul Waigner
- Running time: 100 minutes
- Production company: NBC

Original release
- Network: NBC
- Release: March 19, 1984

Mister Roberts is a 1984 American made-for-television comedy-drama film adapted from the 1948 play by Thomas Heggen and Joshua Logan, based on Heggen's 1946 novel. It stars Robert Hays as Doug Roberts and Charles Durning as the Captain. The film was originally broadcast on NBC on March 19, 1984. That version is said to be "far more interesting and faithful to its source" than the 1965–1966 NBC series.

A mixed review in the New York Times found that the production "had its moments."

== Cast ==
- Robert Hays as Lieutenant Junior Grade Doug Roberts
- Kevin Bacon as Ensign Frank Pulver
- Raye Birk as Dowdy
- Charles Durning as Captain
- Marilu Henner as Nurse Girard
- Howard Hesseman as Doc
