= University Players =

Theater company

The University Players was primarily a summer stock theater company located in West Falmouth, Cape Cod, Massachusetts, from 1928 to 1932.

It was formed in 1928 by eighteen college undergraduates. Notable among them were Eleanor Phelps of Vassar, two undergraduates at Princeton, Bretaigne Windust and Erik Barnouw, and several undergraduates at Harvard, Charles Crane Leatherbee (grandson of American diplomat and philanthropist Charles Richard Crane), Kent Smith, Kingsley Perry, Bartlett Quigley (father of American actress Jane Alexander), and John Swope (son of GE President Gerard Swope and later Hollywood and Life Magazine photographer and husband of actress Dorothy McGuire).

Several others of its members who had their first professional experiences with the University Players went on to achieve fame in the theater and film industry, including Joshua Logan, James Stewart, Henry Fonda, Margaret Sullavan, Mildred Natwick, Aleta Freel, Barbara O'Neil, Myron McCormick, Charles Arnt, Karl Swenson, Kent Smith, Norris Houghton, Frieda Altman, Elsie Schauffler, and Philip Faversham.

Romances born of the University Players led to four marriages: Barbara O'Neil to Joshua Logan for a few years in the 1930s; Logan's little sister Mary Lee Logan to Charles Leatherbee; and that of a few "happy" months in 1932 between actress Margaret Sullavan and actor Henry Fonda; and future author Peggy Friedlander to future English professor Roy Lamson.

== Sources ==
- New York Times, 25 May 1928 "Collegians to Give Plays This Summer : Men and Women of Four Institutions Plan a Season at Falmouth"
