= Mildred Dunnock =

American actress (1901–1991)

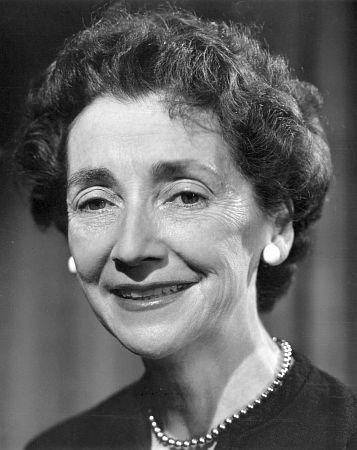
- Dunnock in 1956
- Born: Mildred Dorothy Dunnock; January 25, 1901; Baltimore, Maryland, U.S.
- Died: July 5, 1991 (aged 90); Oak Bluffs, Massachusetts, U.S.
- Resting place: Lambert's Cove Cemetery, West Tisbury, Massachusetts, U.S.
- Education: Goucher College; Johns Hopkins University; Columbia University (MA); Actors Studio
- Occupation: Actress
- Years active: 1932–1987
- Spouse: Keith Merwin Urmy (m. 1933)
- Children: 1

Mildred Dorothy Dunnock (January 25, 1901 – July 5, 1991) was an American stage and screen actress. She was nominated twice for an Academy Award for her work in Death of a Salesman (1951) and Baby Doll (1956).

== Early life ==
Born in Baltimore, Maryland, Dunnock graduated from Western High School. She developed an interest in theater while she was a student at Goucher College where she was a member of Alpha Phi sorority and the Agora dramatic society. After graduating, she taught English at Friends School of Baltimore and helped with productions of plays there.

While teaching school in New York, she earned her Master of Arts degree at Columbia University and acted in a play while she was there. She also studied at the Actors Studio under Lee Strasberg, Robert Lewis and Elia Kazan.

== Career ==
After roles in Broadway productions of Life Begins (1932) and The Hill Between (1938), Dunnock won praise for her performance as a Welsh school teacher in The Corn is Green in 1940 — a role that she performed while she was a full-time teacher at Brearley School. The 1945 film version marked her screen debut. During the 1940s she performed mainly on stage, in such dramas as Another Part of the Forest (1946) and Death of a Salesman (1949) and in the musical Lute Song (1946). She also performed in regional theatrical productions, including those of the Long Wharf Theatre and the Yale Repertory Theatre.

In 1947, she became a founding member of the Actors Studio.

Dunnock reprised her role as Linda Loman, Willy's wife, in the 1951 film version of Death of a Salesman. She originated the role of Big Mama on Broadway in Tennessee Williams' play Cat on a Hot Tin Roof, although she lost the film role to Judith Anderson. Several of her films include The Trouble with Harry (1955), Love Me Tender (1956), Baby Doll (1956), Peyton Place (1957), The Nun's Story (1959), BUtterfield 8 (1960), Something Wild (1961) and Sweet Bird of Youth (1962). She was the woman in the wheelchair pushed down a flight of stairs to her death by the psychotic villain Tommy Udo (Richard Widmark) in Kiss of Death (1947). She also appeared in guest roles on numerous TV series such as Alfred Hitchcock Presents and Ponds Theater, and, later in her career, several television movies.

Dunnock was twice nominated for an Academy Award for Best Supporting Actress, for Death of a Salesman in 1951, and for Baby Doll in 1956. She was also nominated for the Golden Globe for Best Supporting Actress for Baby Doll, as well as Viva Zapata! in 1952 and Peyton Place in 1957.

In 1960 she appeared in the play The Crystal Heart at the East 74th Street Theater with Virginia Vestoff (in her first professional appearance), with top seats selling for $4.96 ($54 in current dollar terms).

In 1966, she played Linda Loman for the third time in the television film adaptation of Death of a Salesman, alongside her original Broadway co-star, Lee J. Cobb. This earned Dunnock a nomination for an Emmy Award in 1967, in the category of Outstanding Single Performance by an Actress in a Leading Role in a Drama.

Her final film was The Pick-up Artist (1987), which starred Robert Downey Jr. and Molly Ringwald.

Dunnock has a star on the Hollywood Walk of Fame for her contribution to motion pictures, at 6613 Hollywood Boulevard. She is also a member of the American Theater Hall of Fame, which she was inducted into in 1983.

== Personal life and death ==
Dunnock was married to Keith Urmy, an executive at Chemical Bank in Manhattan, from 1933 until her death. The couple had one child. In 1991, at age 90, Dunnock died from natural causes in Oak Bluffs, Massachusetts, although at that time she was a resident of nearby West Tisbury.

== Film appearances ==
- The Invisible Man's Revenge (1944) – Norma – the Chambermaid (uncredited)
- The Corn Is Green (1945) – Miss Ronberry
- Kiss of Death (1947) – Mrs. Rizzo (uncredited)
- Death of a Salesman (1951) – Linda Loman
- I Want You (1951) – Sarah Greer
- Viva Zapata! (1952) – Senora Espejo
- The Girl in White (1952) – Dr. Marie Yeomans
- The Jazz Singer (1952) – Mrs. Ruth Golding
- Bad for Each Other (1953) – Mrs. Mary Owen
- Hansel and Gretel: An Opera Fantasy (1954) – Mother (voice)
- The Trouble with Harry (1955) – Mrs. Wiggs
- Love Me Tender (1956) – Martha Reno
- Baby Doll (1956) – Aunt Rose Comfort
- Peyton Place (1957) – Miss Elsie Thornton
- The Nun's Story (1959) – Sister Margharita (Mistress of Postulants)
- The Story on Page One (1959) – Mrs. Ellis
- BUtterfield 8 (1960) – Mrs. Wandrous
- Something Wild (1961) – Mrs. Gates
- Sweet Bird of Youth (1962) – Aunt Nonnie
- Behold a Pale Horse (1964) – Pilar
- Youngblood Hawke (1964) – Sarah Hawke
- 7 Women (1966) – Jane Argent
- Death of a Salesman (1966) – Linda Loman
- What Ever Happened to Aunt Alice? (1969) – Miss Edna Tinsley
- The Spiral Staircase (1975) – Mrs. Sherman
- The Shopping Bag Lady (1975) – Annie Lewis
- Dragonfly (1976) (later: One Summer Love) – Miss Barrow
- The Best Place to Be (1979)
- The Pick-up Artist (1987) – Nellie

== Television ==
- Alfred Hitchcock Presents
  - (Season 2 Episode 5: "None Are So Blind") (1956) – Aunt Muriel Drummond
  - (Season 2 Episode 35: "The West Warlock Time Capsule") (1957) – Louise Tiffany
  - (Season 3 Episode 4: "Heart of Gold") (1957) – Martha Collins
- Thriller (American TV series) (1960) (Season 1 Episode 15: "The Cheaters") – Miriam Olcott
- The Tom Ewell Show (1960) (Season 1 Episode 10: "The Friendly Man") – Mrs. Steckel
- The Investigators (1961) (Season 1 Episode 11: "The Mind's Own Fire") – Mrs. Brewster
- The Alfred Hitchcock Hour (1964) (Season 2 Episode 14: "Beyond the Sea of Death") – Minnie Briggs

== Radio appearances ==
Year	Program	Episode/source
1952	Grand Central Station	Seed of Doubt

== Awards and nominations ==
Year	Award	Category	Nominated work	Result
1952	Academy Awards	Best Supporting Actress	Death of a Salesman	Nominated
1953	Golden Globe Awards	Best Supporting Actress	Viva Zapata!	Nominated
1957	Academy Awards	Best Supporting Actress	Baby Doll	Nominated
1957	Golden Globe Awards	Best Supporting Actress	Baby Doll	Nominated
1958	Golden Globe Awards	Best Supporting Actress	Peyton Place	Nominated
1967	Primetime Emmy Awards	Outstanding Single Performance by an Actress in a Leading Role in a Drama	Death of a Salesman	Nominated
1971	Drama Desk Awards	Outstanding Performance	A Place Without Doors	Won

== See also ==
- The Shopping Bag Lady
