= Death of a Salesman (1966 American film) =

- DVD cover
- Genre: Tragedy
- Based on: Death of a Salesman; 1949 play by Arthur Miller
- Written by: Arthur Miller
- Directed by: Alex Segal
- Starring: Lee J. Cobb; Mildred Dunnock; James Farentino; George Segal
- Music by: Robert Drasnin
- Country of origin: United States

Production
- Producers: Daniel Melnick; David Susskind
- Running time: 100 minutes
- Production company: CBS

Original release
- Network: CBS
- Release: May 8, 1966

Death of a Salesman is a 1966 American made-for-television video adaptation of the 1949 play of the same name by Arthur Miller. It was directed by Alex Segal and was adapted for television by Miller. It received numerous nominations for awards, and won several of them, including three Primetime Emmy Awards, a Directors Guild of America Award and a Peabody Award. It was nominated in a total of 11 Emmy categories at the 19th Primetime Emmy Awards in 1967. Lee J. Cobb reprised his role as Willy Loman and Mildred Dunnock reprised her role as Linda Loman from the original 1949 stage production.

Playbill markets this version of the play as an "abbreviated" one. Although the performance is abridged, it was adapted for television by Miller himself, meaning that not much substance was lost in the changes. The production was taped after several weeks of rehearsals.

It was a 1966 CBS television adaptation, which included Gene Wilder, James Farentino, Bernie Kopell and George Segal. Cobb was nominated for a Primetime Emmy Award for the performance. Mildred Dunnock, who had co-starred in both the original stage version and the 1951 film version, again repeated her role as Linda, Willy's devoted wife, and earned an Emmy nomination. In addition to being Emmy-nominated, Cobb and Dunnock were nominated for a Grammy Award at the 1967 ceremony in the category of Best Spoken Word, Documentary or Drama Recording. This teleplay is one of several adaptations of the play and was contemporaneous with a May 1966 BBC version starring Rod Steiger and produced by Alan Cooke.

The production marked the acclaimed reunion of the leading actor and actress from the original 1949 broadway cast. The performance also marks a strong dramatic turn for George Segal who is known for his comic work, while a young Gene Wilder presents a comic but sensitive performance as Bernard.

== Cast ==
Main Cast

- Lee J. Cobb as Willy Loman
- Mildred Dunnock as Linda Loman
- James Farentino as Happy 'Hap' Loman
- George Segal as Biff Loman
- Gene Wilder as Bernard

Supporting Cast

- Albert Dekker as Uncle Ben
- Edward Andrews as Charley
- Marge Redmond as Woman in Hotel
- Bernie Kopell as Howard Wagner
- Stanley Adams as Stanley
- Joan Patrick as Miss Forsythe
- Karen Steele as Letta
- June Foray as Jenny

== Reception ==
New York Times television critic Jack Gould praised the production as an "evening of exalted theater," and described it as "a revelation of Arthur Miller's 'Death of a Salesman' that will stand as the supreme understanding of the tragedy of Willy Loman." Joan Crosby of The Pittsburgh Press praised all members of the Loman family for their performances and described the performance as "An evening of high drama, not to be missed". United Press International critic Rick Du Brow noted that the first television adaptation earned a place in history: "it promptly took its place among the most unforgettable productions in the history of the video medium." Du Brow praised Cobb's performance as great, Dunnock as a "bastion of strength decency and human understanding," Segal as "superb" and Farentino as "outstanding". Associated Press correspondent Cynthia Lowry described the show as a powerful depiction of "tense, sometimes painful drama" told mostly by flashbacks from happier times. Lowry described Cobb's distraught performance as "overwhelming", Dunnock's portrayal of the "loving, patient and blindly loyal wife" equally powerful and the performances of both sons as sensitive.

== Awards and nominations ==
Year	Award	Category	Nominee(s)	Result	Ref.
1967	Directors Guild of America Awards	Outstanding Directorial Achievement in Television	Alex Segal	Won	
1967	Grammy Awards	Best Spoken Word, Documentary or Drama Recording	Lee J. Cobb and Mildred Dunnock	Nominated	
1967	Peabody Awards	Personal Award	Tom H. John (Note: Also for Color Me Barbra and The Strollin' Twenties.)	Won	
1967	Primetime Emmy Awards	Outstanding Dramatic Program	David Susskind and Daniel Melnick	Won	
1967	Primetime Emmy Awards	Outstanding Single Performance by an Actor in a Leading Role in a Drama	Lee J. Cobb	Nominated	
1967	Primetime Emmy Awards	Outstanding Single Performance by an Actress in a Leading Role in a Drama	Mildred Dunnock	Nominated	
1967	Primetime Emmy Awards	Outstanding Directorial Achievement in Drama	Alex Segal	Won	
1967	Primetime Emmy Awards	Individual Achievements in Art Direction and Allied Crafts – Art Direction	Earl Carlson and Tom John	Won	
1967	Primetime Emmy Awards	Individual Achievements in Electronic Production – Electronic Cameramen	Robert Dunn, Gorman Erickson, Fred Gough, Jack Jennings, and Dick Nelson	Nominated	
1967	Primetime Emmy Awards	Individual Achievements in Electronic Production – Lighting Directors	Leard Davis	Nominated	
1967	Primetime Emmy Awards	Individual Achievements in Electronic Production – Technical Directors	A.J. Cunningham	Nominated	
1967	Primetime Emmy Awards	Individual Achievements in Electronic Production – Video Tape Editing	James E. Brady	Nominated	
1967	Primetime Emmy Awards	Special Classifications of Individual Achievements	Arthur Miller	Won	

== See also ==
- List of American films of 1966
