= The Shopping Bag Lady =

- Directed by: Bert Salzman
- Written by: Bert Salzman
- Starring: Mildred Dunnock
- Cinematography: Paul Glickman
- Music by: Arlon Ober
- Distributed by: Learning Corporation of America
- Release date: 1975
- Running time: 25 minutes
- Country: United States
- Language: English

The Shopping Bag Lady is a 1975 American short film directed by Bert Salzman and starring Mildred Dunnock.

== Plot summary ==
A shopping-bag lady, Annie Lewis (Mildred Dunnock), is viewed as a homeless nobody by two thoughtless teenage girls. After Annie is picked up by the police due to a misunderstanding, one of the girls (Emily) learns to see her as a human being after looking through Annie's possessions (which Emily has salvaged). As a result Emily is more compassionate towards her grandmother, with whom she lives.

== Cast ==
- Mildred Dunnock as Annie Lewis (the Shopping Bag Lady)
- Julie Wakefield as Emily
- Holly Scott as Lucy
- Eleanor Phelps as Grandmother
- Justine Miceli as Helen
- William Bressant as Cop
- Debbie Howard as Girl in school
- Laura Whyte as Nurse
- Chip Carroll as Martin
- Alice Beardsley as Woman in park

== Reception ==
The Shopping Bag Lady was named to the ALA Notable Children's Videos list in 1975.

== See also ==
- List of American films of 1975
