= 19th Primetime Emmy Awards =

1967 American television programming awards

- Date: June 4, 1967
- Location: Century Plaza Hotel, Los Angeles, California
- Presented by: Academy of Television Arts and Sciences
- Hosted by: Joey Bishop; Hugh Downs

Highlights
- Most awards: Mission: Impossible (3)
- Most nominations: Bewitched; The Final War of Olly Winter; I Spy (5)
- Outstanding Comedy Series: The Monkees
- Outstanding Dramatic Series: Mission: Impossible
- Outstanding Dramatic Program: Death of a Salesman
- Outstanding Musical Program: Brigadoon
- Outstanding Variety Series: The Andy Williams Show

Television/radio coverage
- Network: ABC

The 19th Emmy Awards, later known as the 19th Primetime Emmy Awards, were handed out on June 4, 1967, at the Century Plaza Hotel in Los Angeles, California. The ceremony was hosted by Joey Bishop and Hugh Downs. 24 awards were presented. Winners are listed in bold and series' networks are in parentheses.

The top show of the night was Mission: Impossible, which won three major awards. Don Knotts won his fifth Emmy for Outstanding Performance by an Actor in a Supporting Role in a Comedy. This record still stands.

== Winners and nominees ==
=== Programs ===
Programs
**Outstanding Comedy Series**: **The Monkees (NBC)**; The Andy Griffith Show (CBS); Bewitched (ABC); Get Smart (NBC); Hogan's Heroes (CBS)	**Outstanding Dramatic Series**: **Mission: Impossible (CBS)**; The Avengers (ABC); I Spy (NBC); Run for Your Life (NBC); Star Trek (NBC)
**Outstanding Variety Series**: **The Andy Williams Show (NBC)**; The Dean Martin Comedy Hour (NBC); The Hollywood Palace (ABC); The Jackie Gleason Show (CBS); The Smothers Brothers Comedy Hour (CBS); The Tonight Show Starring Johnny Carson (NBC)	**Outstanding Musical Program**: **Brigadoon (ABC)**; The Bell Telephone Hour (NBC); Frank Sinatra: A Man and His Music Part II (NBC)
**Outstanding Variety Special**: **The Sid Caesar, Imogene Coca, Carl Reiner, Howard Morris Special (CBS)**; ABC Stage 67: "A Time for Laughter" (ABC); Chrysler Presents The Bob Hope Christmas Special (NBC); The Dick Van Dyke Special (CBS)	**Outstanding Children's Program**: **Jack and the Beanstalk (NBC)**; Charlie Brown's All-Stars! (CBS); Discovery (ABC); It's the Great Pumpkin, Charlie Brown (CBS)
**Program and Individual Achievements in Daytime Programming - Programs**: **Mutual of Omaha's Wild Kingdom (NBC)**; The General Electric College Bowl (NBC); The Mike Douglas Show (Syndicated)	**Outstanding Dramatic Program**: **Death of a Salesman (CBS)**; ABC Stage 67: "A Christmas Memory" (ABC); ABC Stage 67: "The Love Song of Barney Kempinski" (ABC); CBS Playhouse: "The Final War of Olly Winter" (CBS); CBS Playhouse: "The Glass Menagerie" (CBS); Mark Twain Tonight! (CBS)

=== Acting ===
==== Lead performances ====
Acting
**Outstanding Continued Performance** **by an Actor in a Leading Role in a Comedy Series**: **Don Adams as Maxwell Smart in Get Smart (NBC)**; Bob Crane as Col. Robert E. Hogan in Hogan's Heroes (CBS); Brian Keith as Uncle Bill Davis in Family Affair (CBS); Larry Storch as Cpl. Randolph Agarn in F Troop (ABC)	**Outstanding Continued Performance** **by an Actress in a Leading Role in a Comedy Series**: **Lucille Ball as Lucy Carmichael in The Lucy Show (CBS)**; Elizabeth Montgomery as Samantha Stephens in Bewitched (ABC); Agnes Moorehead as Endora in Bewitched (ABC); Marlo Thomas as Ann Marie in That Girl (ABC)
**Outstanding Continued Performance** **by an Actor in a Leading Role in a Dramatic Series**: **Bill Cosby as Alexander Scott in I Spy (NBC)**; Robert Culp as Kelly Robinson in I Spy (NBC); Ben Gazzara as Paul Bryan in Run for Your Life (NBC); David Janssen as Dr. Richard Kimble in The Fugitive (ABC); Martin Landau as Rollin Hand in Mission: Impossible (CBS)	**Outstanding Continued Performance** **by an Actress in a Leading Role in a Dramatic Series**: **Barbara Bain as Cinnamon Carter in Mission: Impossible (CBS)**; Diana Rigg as Emma Peel in The Avengers (ABC); Barbara Stanwyck as Victoria Barkley in The Big Valley (ABC)

==== Supporting performances ====
**Outstanding Performance by an Actor in a Supporting Role in a Comedy**: **Don Knotts as Barney Fife in The Andy Griffith Show (CBS) (Episode: "Barney Comes to Mayberry")**; Gale Gordon as Mr. Theodore J. Mooney in The Lucy Show (CBS); Werner Klemperer as Col. Wilhelm Klink in Hogan's Heroes (CBS)	**Outstanding Performance by an Actress in a Supporting Role in a Comedy**: **Frances Bavier as Aunt Bee in The Andy Griffith Show (CBS)**; Nancy Kulp as Jane Hathaway in The Beverly Hillbillies (CBS); Marion Lorne as Aunt Clara in Bewitched (ABC)
**Outstanding Performance by an Actor in a Supporting Role in a Drama**: **Eli Wallach as Happy Locarno in Poppies Are Also Flowers (ABC)**; Leo G. Carroll as Alexander Waverly in The Man from U.N.C.L.E. (NBC); Leonard Nimoy as Mr. Spock in Star Trek (NBC)	**Outstanding Performance by an Actress in a Supporting Role in a Drama**: **Agnes Moorehead as Emma Valentine in The Wild Wild West (CBS) (Episode: "Night of the Vicious Valentine")**; Tina Chen as Vietnamese Girl in CBS Playhouse (CBS) (Episode: "The Final War of Olly Winter"); Ruth Warrick as Hannah Cord in Peyton Place (ABC)

==== Single performances ====
**Outstanding Single Performance by an Actor in a Leading Role in a Drama**: **Peter Ustinov as Socrates in Hallmark Hall of Fame: "Barefoot in Athens" (NBC)**; Alan Arkin as Barney Kempinski in ABC Stage 67: "The Love Song of Barney Kempinski" (ABC); Lee J. Cobb as Willy Loman in Death of a Salesman (CBS); Ivan Dixon as Olly Winter in CBS Playhouse: "The Final War of Olly Winter" (CBS); Hal Holbrook as Mark Twain in Mark Twain Tonight! (CBS)	**Outstanding Single Performance by an Actress in a Leading Role in a Drama**: **Geraldine Page as Sook in ABC Stage 67: "A Christmas Memory" (ABC)**; Shirley Booth as Amanda Wingfield in CBS Playhouse: "The Glass Menagerie" (CBS); Mildred Dunnock as Linda Loman in Death of a Salesman (CBS); Lynn Fontanne as Grand Duchess Marie in Hallmark Hall of Fame: "Anastasia" (NBC); Julie Harris as Anastasia in Hallmark Hall of Fame: "Anastasia" (NBC)

=== Directing ===
Directing
**Outstanding Directorial Achievement in Comedy**: **The Monkees (NBC): "Royal Flush" – James Frawley**; Bewitched (ABC) – William Asher; Family Affair (CBS) – William D. Russell; I Spy (NBC): "One of Our Bombs is Missing" – Earl Bellamy; The Lucy Show (CBS) – Maury Thompson	**Outstanding Directorial Achievement in Drama**: **Death of a Salesman (CBS) – Alex Segal**; CBS Playhouse (CBS): "The Final War of Olly Winter" – Paul Bogart; Hallmark Hall of Fame (NBC): "Anastasia" – George Schaefer; Mark Twain Tonight! (CBS) – Paul Bogart
**Outstanding Directorial Achievement in Variety or Music**: **Brigadoon (ABC) – Fielder Cook**; The Andy Williams Show (NBC) – Bob Henry; The Dean Martin Comedy Hour (NBC) – Greg Garrison; Frank Sinatra: A Man and His Music Part II (NBC) – Dwight Hemion; The Sid Caesar, Imogene Coca, Carl Reiner, Howard Morris Special (CBS) – Bill Hobin

=== Writing ===
Writing
**Outstanding Writing Achievement in Comedy**: **Get Smart (NBC): "Ship of Spies, Parts 1 & 2" – Buck Henry and Leonard Stern**; Family Affair (CBS): "Buffy" – Edmund L. Hartmann; I Dream of Jeannie (NBC) – Sidney Sheldon	**Outstanding Writing Achievement in Drama**: **Mission: Impossible (CBS) – Bruce Geller**; CBS Playhouse (CBS): "The Final War of Olly Winter" – Ronald Ribman; I Spy (NBC): "The Warlord" – Robert Culp
**Outstanding Writing Achievement in Variety**: **The Sid Caesar, Imogene Coca, Carl Reiner, Howard Morris Special (CBS) – Mel Brooks, Sam Denoff, Bill Persky, Carl Reiner and Mel Tolkin**; The Dean Martin Comedy Hour (NBC) – Harry Crane, Rich Eustis, Lee Hale, Paul Keyes and Al Rogers; The Jackie Gleason Show (CBS) – Marvin Marx, Walter Stone and Rod Parker

== Most major nominations ==
Networks with multiple major nominations (Note: "Major" constitutes the categories listed above: Program, Acting, Directing, and Writing. Does not include the technical categories.)
Network	Number of Nominations
CBS	44
NBC	31
ABC	22

Programs with multiple major nominations
Program	Category	Network	Number of Nominations
Bewitched	Comedy	ABC	5
The Final War of Olly Winter	Special	CBS	5
I Spy	Drama	NBC	5
Death of a Salesman	Special	CBS	4
Mission: Impossible	Drama	CBS	4
Anastasia	Special	NBC	3
The Andy Griffith Show	Comedy	CBS	3
The Dean Martin Comedy Hour	Variety	NBC	3
Family Affair	Comedy	CBS	3
Get Smart	Comedy	NBC	3
Hogan's Heroes	Comedy	CBS	3
The Lucy Show	Comedy	CBS	3
Mark Twain Tonight!	Special	CBS	3
The Sid Caesar, Imogene Coca, Carl Reiner, Howard Morris Special	Variety	CBS	3
The Andy Williams Show	Variety	NBC	2
The Avengers	Drama	ABC	2
Brigadoon	Music	ABC	2
A Christmas Memory	Special	ABC	2
Frank Sinatra: A Man and His Music Part II	Music	NBC	2
The Glass Menagerie	Special	CBS	2
The Jackie Gleason Show	Variety	CBS	2
The Love Song of Barney Kempinski	Special	ABC	2
The Monkees	Comedy	NBC	2
Run for Your Life	Drama	NBC	2
Star Trek	Drama	NBC	2

== Most major awards ==
Networks with multiple major awards
Network	Number of Awards
CBS	11
NBC	9
ABC	4

Programs with multiple major awards
Program	Category	Network	Number of Awards
Mission: Impossible	Drama	CBS	3
The Andy Griffith Show	Comedy	CBS	2
Brigadoon	Music	ABC	2
Death of a Salesman	Special	CBS	2
Get Smart	Comedy	NBC	2
The Monkees	Comedy	NBC	2
The Sid Caesar, Imogene Coca, Carl Reiner, Howard Morris Special	Variety	CBS	2
