= 19th Directors Guild of America Awards =

- Date: February 11, 1967
- Country: United States
- Presented by: Directors Guild of America

Highlights
- Best Director Feature Film: A Man for All Seasons – Fred Zinnemann
- Best Director Television: Death of a Salesman – Alex Segal
- Website: https://www.dga.org/Awards/History/1960s/1966.aspx?value=1966

The 19th Directors Guild of America Awards, honoring the outstanding directorial achievements in film and television in 1966, were presented on February 11, 1967.

== Winners and nominees ==
=== Film ===
Feature Film

Fred Zinnemann – A Man for All Seasons

- Richard Brooks – The Professionals
- John Frankenheimer – Grand Prix
- Lewis Gilbert – Alfie
- James Hill – Born Free
- Norman Jewison – The Russians Are Coming, the Russians Are Coming
- Claude Lelouch – A Man and a Woman
- Silvio Narizzano – Georgy Girl
- Mike Nichols – Who's Afraid of Virginia Woolf?
- Robert Wise – The Sand Pebbles

=== Television ===
Television

Alex Segal – Death of a Salesman

- Fielder Cook – Brigadoon
- Greg Garrison – The Dean Martin Show
- Alan Handley – Alice Through the Looking Glass
- Dwight Hemion – A Man and His Music – Part II
- Sam Peckinpah – ABC Stage 67 for "Noon Wine"
- Frank Perry – ABC Stage 67 for "A Christmas Memory"
- Stanley Prager – ABC Stage 67 for "The Love Song of Barney Kempinski"
- George Schaefer – Hallmark Hall of Fame for "Barefoot in Athens"
- Ted Yates – Congo: Victim of Independence (NBC News special)
