= Mister Roberts (novel) =

1946 novel by Thomas Heggen

- First edition
- Author: Thomas Heggen
- Illustrator: Samuel Hanks Bryant
- Language: English
- Genre: War novel
- Publisher: Houghton Mifflin
- Publication date: 1946
- Publication place: United States
- Media type: Hardcover
- Pages: 189
- OCLC: 51762498

Mister Roberts is a 1946 novel by Thomas Heggen, based on his experiences in the South West Pacific theatre during World War II. Several characters, including the eponymous Mister Roberts, were based on real people. Lieutenant (junior grade) Roberts defends his crew against the petty tyranny of the ship's commanding officer, while submitting transfer requests on a daily basis. Nearly all action takes place on a US Navy auxiliary cargo ship, the USS Reluctant, which sails, as written in the 1948 play adapted from the novel, "from Apathy to Tedium, with occasional side trips to Monotony and Ennui." Roberts eventually wins his freedom from the “bucket” and assignment to a destroyer, with tragic consequences.

Heggen and Joshua Logan turned the novel into a Tony-award-winning hit play, which opened on Broadway in February 1948. A book dramatizing the play, co-authored by Heggen and Logan and also titled Mister Roberts, was published by Random House in 1948. New York Times critic Lewis Nichols praised all three works: “As a novel Mister Roberts won a few million friends, and as one of the more highly regarded of this season's plays it has added a few million more. Now that the printed form of the drama has come out, there is no reason to suppose its progress will be other than in the same direction“.

== Plot ==
Douglas Roberts, the title character, joined the Navy expecting that he would be assigned to surface combat in a destroyer or a cruiser. He had no idea that the Navy had support ships. To his distress, he was assigned first to a tanker in the Atlantic and then to the USS Reluctant, AK-601, a general cargo freighter ferrying supplies to backwater Pacific bases. Mr. Roberts is the ship's First Lieutenant, meaning that he is responsible for maintaining the entire ship except for the engineering spaces. He hates the ship, but he is more responsible for her than anyone aboard apart from the Captain. The irony is not lost on him.

Every month, he submits a request for transfer; every month, Captain Morton, the commanding officer of the Reluctant, forwards it, not recommending approval. Roberts is the balance wheel between the unreasonable behavior of the Captain and the frustration of the crew at being assigned to "this bucket", which never goes anywhere worth going or does anything worth doing.

The novel is a series of stories set aboard the Reluctant, showing the problems of life aboard a naval auxiliary in the rear areas of the Pacific war. One chapter deals with a very new ensign finding his feet aboard a ship much more casual than a taut man-of-war. Another shows the kind of feuding that months of boredom can engender between two officers. One chapter shows what can happen when a crew that hasn't had a liberty in more than a year is anchored off an island that has a naval hospital with nurses and no shades on their windows. Yet another recounts what happens when the Reluctant is sent with a load of cargo to the port of Elysium and Captain Morton grants liberty to half the crew. The final chapter illustrates the affection of the crew towards Mr. Roberts, when his transfer finally comes through and he leaves the ship to return to the United States for assignment to a new destroyer where he is killed in action.

== Background ==
Heggen based his novel on his experiences aboard the cargo ships USS Virgo (AKA-20) and USS Rotanin (AK-108), in the South West Pacific theatre of World War II. He had written a number of short stories, which he collected and merged into the novel. It was subsequently adapted as a 1948 play, a 1955 feature film, a 1965–66 television series, and a live 1984 television movie.

Heggen only enjoyed the initial success and profits of his creation, as his life ended in May 1949, just after turning 30. Heggen was found dead in his bathtub. The New York Times reported that according to the coroner, he had drowned. Many of those close to him believed that it was an accident. According to the Los Angeles Times obituary of Dr. Robert Litman, a pioneer in suicide prevention, Litman's “interest in the subject was sparked by the death of his high school best friend, Thomas Heggen”. In 1974, John Leggett's book, Ross and Tom: Two American Tragedies, explored the lives of “ two young novelists, just my age and no more promising in background, (who) had been published so successfully that their first books made them rich and famous. Then, at the peak of their acclaim, they died. The first, Ross Lockridge, took his own life... The second, Thomas Heggen, drowned in his bathwater—an accident, it was claimed, but it was the accident of a desperate man.”

The character Mister Roberts was based on the Rotanin's executive officer, Donald House. Unlike the character in the book, he was not killed in action, but continued as a career Naval officer until retirement, and lived until early 1998.

The ship's Captain portrayed in Mister Roberts, played by James Cagney, and the ensuing palm tree shenanigans, was based on the real-life captain of the USS Virgo (AKA-20), Lt. Commander Herbert Ezra Randall Sr., USNR. Captain Randall continued as a career Naval officer until retirement and lived in southern California until November 21, 1991. In 1997, the USS Virgo Association held their annual meeting in Riverside, California and conducted a graveside ceremony, plot: 28, 2693; Riverside National Cemetery, Riverside County, California, including a 21-gun salute in honor of their captain—complete with a potted palm tree placed on the grave.

In December 2011, honoring the 65th anniversary of the book's publication, James C. Roberts, cousin of the friend for whom Heggen named his leading man, wrote a long article for the Navy Times about the background, history and significance of the novel. Roberts wrote that "Like his fictional 'Old Stupid' counterpart, Captain Randall did own two palm trees, and like the characters Doug Roberts and Ensign Pulver, Heggen threw them over the side."
