= USS Rotanin =

Cargo ship of the United States Navy

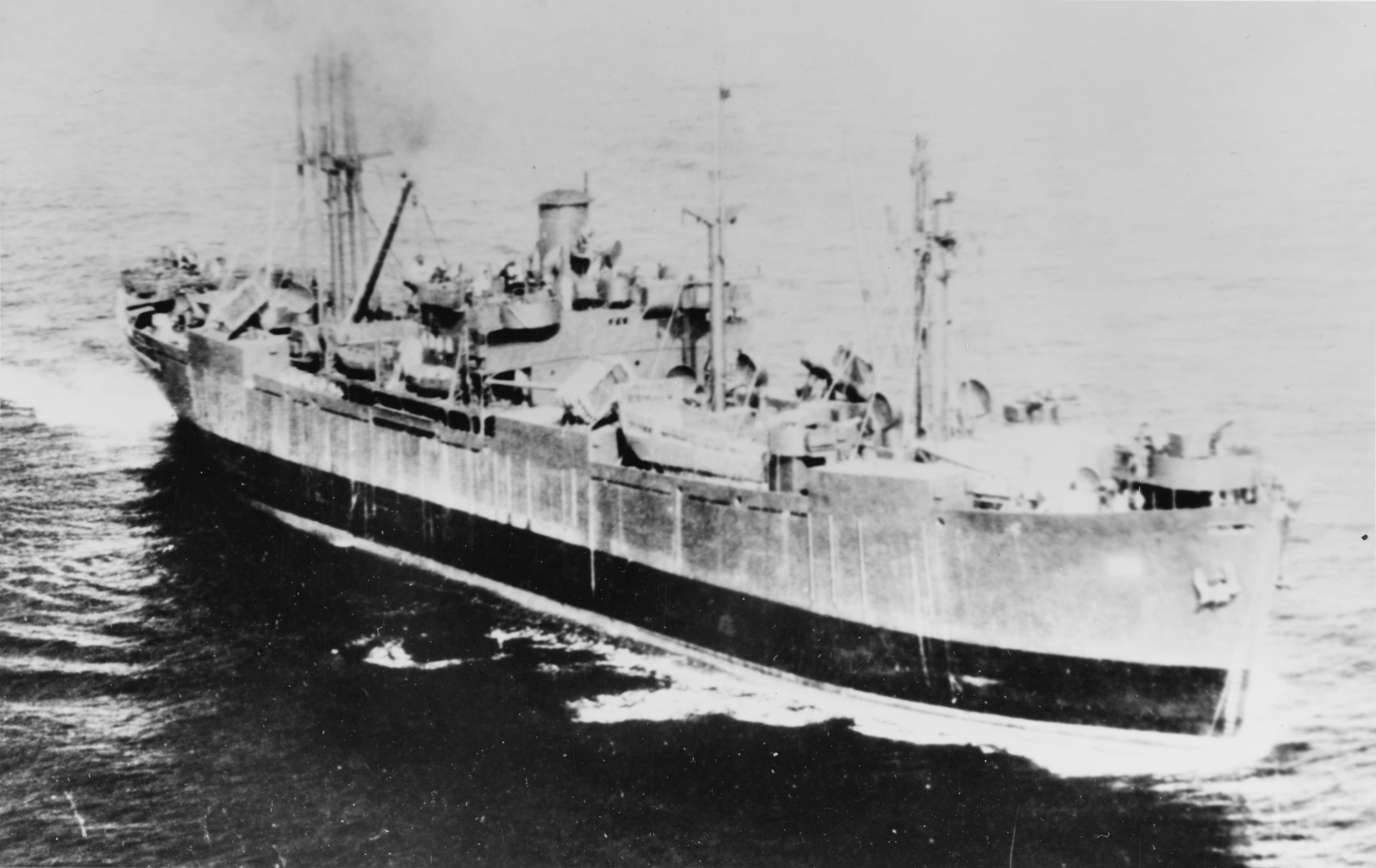
- USS Rotanin (AK-108)

History

United States
- Name: William Kelly; Rotanin
- Namesake: William Kelly; The star Rotanin
- Ordered: as a Type EC2-S-C1 hull, MCE hull 1872
- Builder: California Shipbuilding Corporation, Terminal Island, Los Angeles, California
- Yard number: 243
- Way number: 5
- Laid down: 24 July 1943
- Launched: 18 August 1943
- Sponsored by: Mrs. Andrew R. Bone
- Commissioned: 23 November 1943
- Decommissioned: 5 April 1946
- Stricken: 17 April 1946
- Identification: Hull symbol: AK-108; Code letters: NTTW
- Honors and awards: 1 × battle star
- Fate: returned to MARCOM, 5 April 1946, laid up in the National Defense Reserve Fleet, Suisun Bay Group, Benicia, California; sold for scrapping, 29 April 1966, removed, 5 May 1966, scrapping completed, 30 August 1966

General characteristics
- Class & type: Crater-class cargo ship
- Type: Type EC2-S-C1
- Displacement: 4,023 long tons (4,088 t) (standard); 14,550 long tons (14,780 t) (full load)
- Length: 441 ft 6 in (134.57 m)
- Beam: 56 ft 11 in (17.35 m)
- Draft: 28 ft 4 in (8.64 m)
- Installed power: 2 × Babcock & Wilcox header-type boilers, 220psi 450°; 2,500 shp (1,900 kW)
- Propulsion: 1 × Joshua Hendy vertical triple-expansion reciprocating steam engine; 1 × shaft
- Speed: 12.5 kn (23.2 km/h; 14.4 mph)
- Capacity: 7,800 t (7,700 long tons) DWT; 444,206 cu ft (12,578.5 m^{3}) (non-refrigerated)
- Complement: 16 officers 190 enlisted
- Armament: 1 × 5 in (127 mm)/38 caliber dual purpose (DP) gun; 4 × 40 mm (1.57 in) Bofors anti-aircraft (AA) gun mounts; 6 × 20 mm (0.79 in) Oerlikon cannons AA gun mounts

USS Rotanin (AK-108) was a Crater-class cargo ship commissioned by the United States Navy for service in World War II. Rotanin, which is a misspelling of the name "Rotanen", was named after the star Beta Delphini, a star located in the constellation Delphinus. She was responsible for delivering troops, goods and equipment to locations in the Asiatic-Pacific Theater.

== Construction ==
Rotanin was laid down 24 July 1943, under United States Maritime Commission (MARCOM) contract, MC hull No. 1872, as the Liberty ship SS William Kelly, by California Shipbuilding Corporation, Terminal Island, Los Angeles, California; launched 18 August 1943; sponsored by Mrs. Andrew R. Bone; and commissioned 23 November 1943.

== Service history ==
Completing shakedown 5 December, Rotanin loaded her first combat cargo and embarked her first military passengers at Port Hueneme, California, and on 12 December, sailed for Nouméa. Arriving 5 January 1944, she carried troops and cargo to Guadalcanal, then, on 27 December, continued on to the Russell Islands. By 2 February, she had discharged all cargo and was underway back to the Guadalcanal-Florida Island area. From then until March, she carried cargo and personnel throughout the Bismarck Archipelago, the Solomons, the Fijis, and the New Hebrides. In April, she completed a run to Auckland, New Zealand, and in May, she moved supplies to Manus. She then resumed runs in the Solomons-New Hebrides-Fiji area.

=== Supporting the Allied invasion forces ===
In August, Rotanin shifted to the Marshalls-Marianas area and at the end of the month she moved further west, to Ulithi. In October, she carried United States Army units to the Palaus, embarked Marines there, and transported them to the Russells. In November, she returned to operations in the Marianas, extended them to the Carolines, and in January 1945, returned to Nouméa. February and March took her back to Micronesia and New Zealand. In April, she was in the Solomons, and, in May, she took on Army supplies and reinforcements for the Okinawa campaign. Arriving off the Hagushi beaches on 21 May, she completed offloading by the end of the month and on 31 May, she steamed east.

=== End-of-war activity ===
During June and July, Rotanin again operated in the Marshalls and Marianas. On 28 July, she headed for Hawaii and the west coast. En route when hostilities ceased, she arrived at San Francisco, California, on 17 August. In October, she joined the ships assigned to transpacific operations to ferry occupation troops to Japan and Korea and to return veterans to the United States.

== Post-war inactivation and decommissioning ==
On 2 February 1946, Rotanin arrived at San Francisco and reported to the Commander, 12th Naval District for inactivation. She was decommissioned on 5 April 1946, and returned to MARCOM. Her name was stricken from the Navy List on 17 April 1946.

== Fate ==
She was placed in the National Defense Reserve Fleet, Suisun Bay Group, until purchased by Nicolai Joffe Corporation, 29 April 1966, for $50,165. She was removed from the fleet on 5 May 1966, and her scrapping was completed 30 August 1966, at National Steel and Shipbuilding Company (NASSCO).

== Awards ==

Rotanin earned one battle star during World War II. Her crew was eligible for the following medals:

- American Campaign Medal
- Asiatic–Pacific Campaign Medal (1)
- World War II Victory Medal
- Navy Occupation Service Medal (with Asia clasp)

== Media ==
The novel Mr. Roberts and its stage and cinematic adaptations, may have been inspired in part by Rotanin and Virgo, the two Navy cargo vessels on which Thomas Heggen, author of the novel, served during World War II.

== Bibliography ==
=== Online citations ===
- "Rotanin". Dictionary of American Naval Fighting Ships. Naval History and Heritage Command. 31 August 2015. This article incorporates text from this source, which is in the public domain.
- "California Shipbuilding, Los Angeles CA". www.ShipbuildingHistory.com. 13 October 2010.
- "USS Rotanin (AK-108)". NavSource. 16 December 2016.
- "WILLIAM KELLY". United States Department of Transportation. Archived from the original on December 12, 2019.
