= Mister Roberts (play) =

1948 play written by Joshua Logan

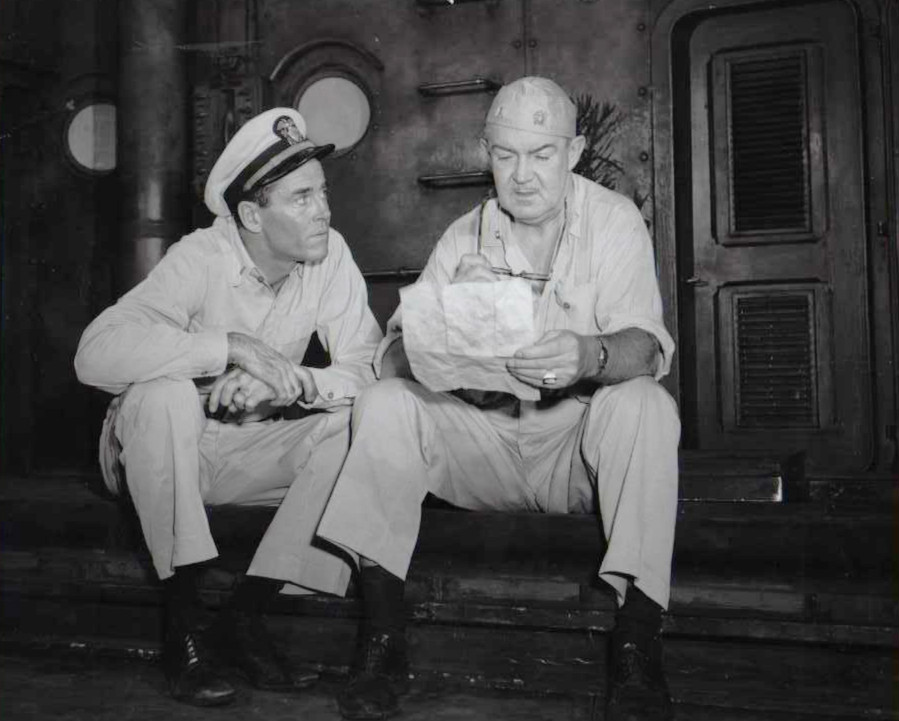
- Henry Fonda and Robert Burton, 1950
- Original language: English
- Written by: Thomas Heggen (novel, play); Joshua Logan (play)
- Characters: Lieutenant Doug Roberts; The Captain; Doc; Ensign Pulver; Wiley; Gerhart; Lieutenant Ann Girard; Reber; Shore Patrol Officer; Stefanowski
- Genre: Comedy
- Setting: World War II; aboard the USS Reluctant in the South Pacific

Premiere
- Date: 18 February 1948
- Place: Alvin Theatre

Mister Roberts is a 1948 play based on the 1946 Thomas Heggen novel of the same name.

== Description and background ==
The novel began as a collection of short stories about Heggen's US Navy experiences aboard USS Rotanin and USS Virgo in the South Pacific during World War II. Broadway producer Leland Hayward acquired the rights for the play and hired Heggen and Joshua Logan for the adaptation.

A book dramatizing the play, co-authored by Heggen and Logan and also titled Mister Roberts, was published by Random House in 1948. The New York Times critic Lewis Nichols praised the work as standing on its own.

Joshua Logan's account of his collaboration with Thomas Heggen in the writing of the play is in Logan's autobiography, Josh: My Up and Down, In and Out Life.

== Productions ==
Mister Roberts opened on Broadway at the Alvin Theatre on February 18, 1948, starring Henry Fonda, David Wayne, Robert Keith, and Jocelyn Brando, who replaced Eva Marie Saint before the show opened. Logan's brother-in-law, William Harrigan, played the Captain. The original production also featured Harvey Lembeck, Ralph Meeker, Steven Hill, Lee Van Cleef, and Murray Hamilton. Fonda was released from a Hollywood film contract to star in the Broadway production. He won the Tony Award for Best Actor in a Play. A Chicago production was also running in 1949. The Broadway production ran for 1,157 performances (closing on January 6, 1951). Fonda later reprised his role of Lieutenant Roberts in the 1955 film of the same name.

Tyrone Power starred in the London company. John Forsythe appeared in a national touring production. Many actors began their careers in various productions and touring companies. Fess Parker began his showbusiness career in the play in 1951.

When the play opened in Albany, New York, the local Catholic diocese launched a boycott of the production, claiming: "The dialog is crammed with ribald, lewd and blasphemous language. This type of entertainment, pawned off in the name of realism, should be resented by all right-thinking people."

In 1963, the play was touring with Hugh O'Brian in the main role, with Chris Noel, Will Hutchins, Vincent Gardenia, Tony Mordente, Alan Yorke, Vince O'Brien, Bill Fletcher, and John J. Martin. It was directed by Billy Matthews. It was later back on Broadway.

== Awards and nominations ==
Year	Award	Category	Nominee	Result
1948	Tony Awards	Best Play		Won
1948	Tony Awards	Best Performance by a Leading Actor in a Play	Henry Fonda	Won
1948	Tony Awards	Best Producer	Leland Hayward	Won
1948	Tony Awards	Best Author	Thomas Heggen and Joshua Logan	Won
1948	Tony Awards	Best Director	Joshua Logan	Won
1948	Theatre World Award		Ralph Meeker	Won
