= Thomas Heggen =

American writer

- Born: December 23, 1918; Fort Dodge, Iowa, U.S.
- Died: May 19, 1949 (aged 30); New York City, U.S.
- Resting place: Lakewood Cemetery
- Education: University of Minnesota
- Occupations: Author, playwright
- Known for: Tony Awards for Mister Roberts
- Spouse: Carol Lynn Gilmer (1942–1946)

Thomas Heggen (December 23, 1918 – May 19, 1949) was an American author best known for his 1946 novel Mister Roberts and its adaptations to stage and screen. Heggen became an Oklahoman in 1935, when in the depths of the Depression his father's business failed and his family moved from Iowa to Oklahoma City for work. He was Wallace Stegner's cousin.

== Navy service ==
After attending Oklahoma City University, Oklahoma State University, and graduating from the University of Minnesota, where he was classmate of Max Shulman, Thomas R. St. George and Norman Katkov, with a degree in journalism, Heggen moved to New York City and became an editor for Reader's Digest. He joined the U.S. Navy immediately after the attack on Pearl Harbor and was commissioned as a lieutenant in August 1942. For the duration of the War, he served on supply vessels in the North Atlantic, the Caribbean and the Pacific, the latter as assistant communications officer on the cargo ship USS Virgo and also the USS Rotanin.

During his 14 months aboard the Virgo, Heggen wrote a collection of vignettes about daily life on the ship, which he described as sailing "from Tedium to Apathy and back again, with an occasional side trip to Monotony". Like his fictional alter ego Doug Roberts, he felt "left out" of the War and butted heads with his commander, a coarse martinet who repeatedly denied his requests for transfer to a destroyer. The fictional "Captain Morton" of the movie and dramatizations was Naval Reserve Lieutenant Commander Herbert Ezra Randall, a Merchant Marine officer. According to Naval History magazine, Randall "had disdain for the ways of the Navy. Like his fictional “Old Stupid” counterpart, Captain Randall did own two palm trees, and like the characters Doug Roberts and Ensign Pulver, Heggen threw them over the side."

== Mister Roberts ==
Following his discharge in December 1945, he returned to New York and reworked the material into a loosely structured novel, adding an introductory chapter. His original title, The Iron-Bound Bucket, was changed to Mister Roberts by the publisher.

Despite mixed reviews, it sold over one million copies and made Heggen the toast of the New York literary scene, followed by a lucrative offer to adapt the book for the Broadway stage. For this, he enlisted the aid of humorist Max Shulman but the collaboration did not work out. He then turned to producer-director Joshua Logan, who emphasized the work's farcical elements while retaining its serious undertones. With Henry Fonda in the title role, the 1948 stage version of Mister Roberts was a smash. Heggen and Logan shared the first Tony Award presented for Best Play.

== Death ==
Bewildered by the fame he had longed for, and under pressure to turn out another bestseller, he found himself with a crippling case of writer's block. "I don't know how I wrote Mister Roberts", he said to a friend. "It was spirit writing". He became an insomniac and tried to cure it with increasing amounts of alcohol and prescription drugs. On May 19, 1949, Heggen drowned in his bathtub at age 30 after an overdose of sleeping pills. His death was widely reported a probable suicide, though he left no note and those close to him insisted it was an accident. The Chief Medical Examiner reported on June 8, 1949, that Heggen died by drowning though chemical analysis had revealed a "considerable amount of barbiturates". He was buried in Lakewood Cemetery.
