= Joshua Logan =

American theatre and film director, playwright, screenwriter, and actor (1908–1988)

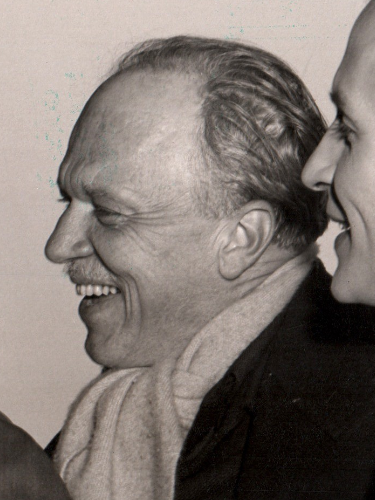
- Logan in 1957
- Born: Joshua Lockwood Logan III; October 5, 1908; Texarkana, Texas, U.S.
- Died: July 12, 1988 (aged 79); New York City, New York, U.S.
- Education: Princeton University
- Occupations: Director, producer, playwright, screenwriter, actor
- Years active: 1932–1987
- Spouses: Barbara O'Neil (m. 1939; div. 1940) Nedda Harrigan (m. 1945)
- Children: 2
- Awards: See below

Joshua Lockwood Logan III (October 5, 1908 – July 12, 1988) was an American theatre and film director, producer, playwright, screenwriter, and actor. One of the most prolific and acclaimed Broadway directors of the 1940s and ‘50s, he was an eight-time Tony Award winner and shared a Pulitzer Prize for co-writing the musical South Pacific, and was involved in writing other musicals. For his film work, he was a three-time Academy Award nominee, twice for Best Director and once for Best Picture.

== Early years ==
Logan was born in Texarkana, Texas, the son of Susan (née Nabors) and Joshua Lockwood Logan. When he was three years old, his father committed suicide. Logan, his mother, and his younger sister, Mary Lee, then moved to his maternal grandparents' home in Mansfield, Louisiana, which Logan used 40 years later as the setting for his play The Wisteria Trees. Logan's mother remarried six years after his father's death and he then attended Culver Military Academy in Culver, Indiana, where his stepfather served on the staff as a teacher. At school, he experienced his first drama class and felt at home.

After his high school graduation he attended Princeton University, here he was active in the Triangle Club, the university’s venerable musical theatre troupe. Moreover, he was involved with the intercollegiate summer stock company, known as the University Players, with fellow student James Stewart and also non-students Henry Fonda and Margaret Sullavan. During his senior year, he served as president of the Princeton Triangle Club. Before his graduation, he won a scholarship to travel to Moscow to observe the rehearsals of Konstantin Stanislavski, and Logan left school without a diploma.

== Broadway ==
Logan began his Broadway career as an actor in Carry Nation in 1932. He was also in I Was Waiting for You (1933).

He then spent time in London, where he staged two productions and directed a touring revival of Camille. He also worked as an assistant stage manager.

=== Director ===
Back on Broadway he staged It's You I Want (1935) and To See Ourselves (1935) and was stage manager for Most of the Game (1935). He staged Hell Freezes Over (1935–36) and returned to acting with A Room in Red and White (1936).

He went to Hollywood where he did some dialogue directing on The Garden of Allah (1936), History Is Made at Night (1937), and Suez (1938). Logan was given the chance to co-direct the feature film I Met My Love Again (1938) for Walter Wanger.

Logan returned to Broadway where he had his first major success as a director with Paul Osborn's On Borrowed Time (1938), which ran for 321 performances. He followed it with the musical I Married an Angel (1938–39), which ran for 331 performances.

He directed Knickerbocker Holiday (1938), Stars in Your Eyes (1939), Osborn's Morning's at Seven (1939–40), Two For the Show (1940), and Higher and Higher (1940, 84 performances). None of these was a break-out success but his revival of Charley's Aunt (1940–41) went for 233 performances, and the Hart-Rodgers musical By Jupiter (1942–43) with Ray Bolger went for 427 performances.

=== World War II ===
In 1942, Logan was drafted by the U.S. Army. During his service in World War II, he acted as a public-relations and intelligence officer. Logan was selected to become an assistant director of Irving Berlin's This Is the Army and when in Europe organized "jeep shows" of entertainers serving as soldiers doing their shows near the front lines.

When the war concluded, he was discharged with the rank of captain and returned to Broadway. He married his second wife, actress Nedda Harrigan, in 1945; Logan's previous marriage, to actress Barbara O'Neil, a colleague of his at the University Players in the 1930s, had ended in divorce.

=== Post-war success ===
Logan's directing career resumed with the musical Annie Get Your Gun (1946–49), which ran for 1,147 performances.

He followed it with Anita Loos' Happy Birthday (1948, 563 performances), and Norman Krasna's John Loves Mary (1948–49, 423 performances). Logan's golden run continued with Mister Roberts (1948–1951) which he co-wrote as well as directed; it ran for 1,157 performances and earned him a Tony Award.

Then he directed and co-wrote South Pacific (1949–1954), which went for 1,925 performances. Logan shared the 1950 Pulitzer Prize for Drama with Richard Rodgers and Oscar Hammerstein II for co-writing South Pacific. The show earned him a Tony Award for Best Director. Despite his contributions to the musical, The New York Times originally omitted his name as co-author, and the Pulitzer Prize committee initially awarded the prize to only Rodgers and Hammerstein. Although the mistakes were corrected, Logan wrote in his autobiography: "I knew then why people fight so hard to have their names in proper type. It's not just ego or 'the principle of the thing,' it's possibly another job or a better salary. It's reassurance. My name had been so minimized that I lived through years of having people praise South Pacific in my presence without knowing I had had anything to do with it."

Logan wrote, produced and directed The Wisteria Tree (1950), an adaptation of The Cherry Orchard, which was a minor success.

Logan cowrote, coproduced, and directed the 1952 musical Wish You Were Here. After the show was not initially successful, Logan quickly wrote 54 new pages of material, and by the ninth performance, the show looked new. In its fourth week of release, the show sold out, and continued to offer sell-out performances for the next two years.

He had another success with Picnic (1953–1954), the play by William Inge, which went for 477 performances. Krasna's Kind Sir (1953–54) lasted 166 performances, and Fanny (1953–1954) which Logan co-wrote, co-produced and directed, ran 888 performances.

== Hollywood ==
When director John Ford became sick, Logan reluctantly returned to Hollywood to complete the filming of Mister Roberts (1955). It was a success commercially and critically.

Logan directed the film adaptation of his own Picnic (1955), for which he received an Oscar nomination. Bus Stop (1956) with Marilyn Monroe, his next movie, was another hit.

Logan returned to Broadway, directing Middle of the Night by Paddy Chayefsky, which ran 477 performances.

He visited Japan to direct Marlon Brando in Sayonara (1957), which earned him a second Oscar nomination for Best Director. He did the movie version of South Pacific (1958).

Logan went back to Broadway and directed Blue Denim (1958, 166 performances) and the hugely popular The World of Suzie Wong (1958–1960, 508 performances). He produced Epitaph for George Dillon (1958).

Logan returned to Hollywood with Tall Story (1960), which introduced Jane Fonda to movie audiences. Back on Broadway, he directed There Was a Little Girl (1960), his first theatre flop in some years, running for only 16 performances. In Hollywood he did the movie adaptation of Fanny (1961).

In 1961, he was a member of the jury at the 2nd Moscow International Film Festival.

Logan continued to alternate Broadway and Hollywood for the rest of the 1960s. He did the Broadway musicals All American (1962, 86 performances) and Mr. President (1962–1963, 265 performances), and Tiger, Tiger Burning Bright (1962–1963, 33 performances), then made the film Ensign Pulver (1964).

After Ready When You Are, C.B.! (1964–1965, 80 performances), he did the movies of Lerner and Loewe's Camelot (1967) and Paint Your Wagon (1969). Back on Broadway, he did Look to the Lilies (1970, 31 performances).

=== Later career ===
Logan's 1976 autobiography Josh: My Up-and-Down, In-and-Out Life gives a frank account of his bipolar disorder. He appeared with his wife in the 1977 nightclub revue Musical Moments, featuring Logan's most popular Broadway numbers. He published Movie Stars, Real People, and Me in 1978.

In 1979, he produced Larry Cohen's Trick on Broadway. He directed Horowitz and Mrs. Washington (1980), which ran for six performances.

From 1983 to 1986, he taught theater at Florida Atlantic University in Boca Raton, Florida. He was also responsible for bringing Carol Channing to Broadway in Lend an Ear!.

== Personal life ==
Logan experienced mood fluctuations for many years, which in the 1970s psychiatrist Ronald R. Fieve treated with lithium, and the two appeared on TV talk shows extolling its virtues.

Logan was married briefly (1939–1940) to actress Barbara O'Neil. After the couple divorced, he was married to Nedda Harrigan from 1945 until his death; they had a daughter, Susan Harrigan Logan, and a son, Thomas Heggen Logan.

In 2019, Jane Fonda, who starred in Logan's 1960 film Tall Story, claimed both she and Logan were in love with lead actor Anthony Perkins at the time of filming, causing tension during an already difficult shoot.

=== Death ===
After suffering from progressive supranuclear palsy (PSP) for several years, Logan died in New York City on July 12, 1988, at the age of 79.

== Theatre credits ==
Year	Title	Functioned as			Original venue	Notes	Ref.
Year	Title	Director	Producer	Other	Original venue	Notes	Ref.
1928	In the Next Room	No	No	Yes	Elizabeth Theater, Falmouth	Actor	
1931	Paris Bound	No	No	Yes	University Players Theatre, Falmouth	Actor	
1931	The Devil in the Cheese	Yes	No	No	Maryland Theater, Baltimore		
1931	The Ghost Train	Yes	No	No	Maryland Theater, Baltimore		
1931	The Constant Nymph	No	No	Yes	Maryland Theater, Baltimore	Actor; as 'Jacob Birnbaum'	
1932	Coquette	Yes	No	No	Maryland Theater, Baltimore		
1932	Mary Rose	Yes	No	No	Maryland Theater, Baltimore		
1932	The Second Man	Yes	No	No	Maryland Theater, Baltimore		
1932	Holiday	No	No	Yes	Maryland Theater, Baltimore	Actor; as 'Nick Potter'	
1932	The Last Mile	Yes	No	No	Maryland Theater, Baltimore		
1932	Let Us Be Gay	Yes	No	No	Maryland Theater, Baltimore		
1932	Paris Bound	Yes	No	No	Maryland Theater, Baltimore		
1932	The Dark Hours	No	No	Yes	Maryland Theater, Baltimore	Actor; as 'Caiaphas'	
1932	The Trial of Mary Dugan	Yes	No	No	Maryland Theater, Baltimore		
1932	Carry Nation	No	No	Yes	Elizabeth Theater, Falmouth	Actor; as 'Matt Strong'	
1933	I Was Waiting for You	No	No	Yes	Booth Theatre, New York	Actor; as 'Edouard'	
1935	It's You I Want	Yes	No	No	Cort Theatre, New York		
1935	To See Ourselves	Yes	Yes	No	Ethel Barrymore Theatre, New York		
1935	Most of the Game	No	No	Yes	Cort Theatre, New York	Actor; as 'Waiter'; Also stage manager	
1935–36	Hell Freezes Over	Yes	No	No	Ritz Theatre, New York		
1936	A Room in Red and White	Yes	No	No	48th Street Theatre, New York	Role; as 'Robert Humphreys'	
1938	On Borrowed Time	Yes	No	No	Longacre Theatre, New York		
1938–39	I Married an Angel	Yes	No	No	Shubert Theatre, New York		
1938–39	Knickerbocker Holiday	Yes	No	No	Ethel Barrymore Theatre, New York		
1939	Stars In Your Eyes	Yes	No	No	Majestic Theatre, New York		
1939–40	Morning's at Seven	Yes	No	No	Longacre Theatre, New York		
1940	Two for the Show	Yes	No	No	Booth Theatre, New York		
1940	Higher and Higher	Yes	No	No	Shubert Theatre, New York		
1940–41	Charley's Aunt	Yes	No	No	Cort Theatre, New York		
1942–43	By Jupiter	Yes	No	No	Shubert Theatre, New York		
1942	This Is the Army	Yes	No	No	Broadway Theatre, New York	Additional direction	
1946–48	Happy Birthday	Yes	No	No	Broadhurst Theatre, New York		
1946–48	Happy Birthday	Yes	No	No	Plymouth Theatre, New York		
1946–49	Annie Get Your Gun	Yes	No	No	Imperial Theatre, New York		
1947–49	Annie Get Your Gun	Yes	No	No	U.S. tour		
1947–48	John Loves Mary	Yes	No	No	Booth Theatre, New York		
1947–48	John Loves Mary	Yes	No	No	Music Box Theatre, New York		
1948–51	Mister Roberts	Yes	No	No	Alvin Theatre, New York		
1949–54	South Pacific	Yes	Yes	No	Majestic Theatre, New York		
1950–55	South Pacific	No	Yes	No	U.S. tour		
1950	The Wisteria Trees	Yes	Yes	No	New York City Center, New York		
1952–53	Wish You Were Here	Yes	Yes	Yes	Imperial Theatre, New York	Also choreographer	
1953–54	Picnic	Yes	Yes	No	Music Box Theatre, New York		
1953–54	Kind Sir	Yes	Yes	No	Alvin Theatre, New York		
1954	Fanny	Yes	Yes	No	Majestic Theatre, New York		
1954	Fanny	Yes	Yes	No	Belasco Theatre, New York		
1956–57	Fanny	Yes	Yes	No	U.S. tour		
1956–57	Middle of the Night	Yes	Yes	No	ANTA Playhouse, New York		
1958	Blue Denim	Yes	No	No	Playhouse Theatre, New York		
1958	Epitaph for George Dillon	No	Yes	No	John Golden Theatre, New York		
1958–60	The World of Suzie Wong	Yes	No	No	Broadhurst Theatre, New York		
1960	The World of Suzie Wong	Yes	No	No	North American tour		
1960	There Was a Little Girl	Yes	No	No	Cort Theatre, New York		
1962	All American	Yes	No	No	Winter Garden Theatre, New York		
1962–63	Mr. President	Yes	No	No	St. James Theatre, New York		
1962–63	Tiger, Tiger Burning Bright	Yes	No	No	Booth Theatre, New York		
1964–65	Ready When You Are, C.B.!	Yes	No	No	Brooks Atkinson Theatre, New York		
1965	Hot September	Yes	No	No	Shubert Theatre, Boston		
1970	Look to the Lilies	Yes	No	No	Lunt-Fontanne Theatre, New York		
1974	Miss Moffat	Yes	No	No	Shubert Theater, Philadelphia		
1976	Rip Van Winkle	Yes	No	No	Kennedy Center, Washington D.C.		
1979	Trick	No	Yes	No	Playhouse Theatre, New York		
1980	Horowitz and Mrs. Washington	Yes	No	No	John Golden Theatre, New York		
1983	Miss Moffat	Yes	No	No	Indianapolis Museum of Art, Indianapolis		

== Filmography ==
Year	Title	Functioned as			Notes	Ref.
Year	Title	Director	Writer	Producer	Notes	Ref.
1938	I Met My Love Again	Yes	No	No	Co-directed with Arthur Ripley	
1955	Mister Roberts	Yes	Yes	No	Uncredited director of reshoots	
1955	Picnic	Yes	No	No		
1956	Bus Stop	Yes	No	No		
1957	Sayonara	Yes	No	No		
1958	South Pacific	Yes	Yes	No		
1960	Tall Story	Yes	No	Yes		
1961	Fanny	Yes	Yes	Yes		
1964	Ensign Pulver	Yes	Yes	Yes		
1967	Camelot	Yes	No	No		
1969	Paint Your Wagon	Yes	No	No		

== Bibliography ==
=== Books ===
- Logan, Joshua (1976). Josh: My Up and Down, In and Out Life. Delacorte Press, New York.
- Logan, Joshua (1978). Movie Stars, Real People, and Me. Delacorte Press, New York.

=== Plays written ===
- Fanny
- Higher and Higher
- Hot September
- Mister Roberts
- South Pacific
- The Wisteria Trees
- Wish You Were Here

== Awards and honors ==
Institution	Year	Category	Work	Result	Ref.
Academy Awards	1956	Best Director	Picnic	Nominated	
Academy Awards	1958	Best Director	Sayonara	Nominated	
Academy Awards	1962	Best Picture	Fanny	Nominated	
Cahiers du Cinéma	1956	Annual Top 10 List	Picnic	9th place	
Directors Guild of America	1956	Outstanding Directorial Achievement in Theatrical Feature Film	Picnic	Nominated	
Directors Guild of America	1957	Outstanding Directorial Achievement in Theatrical Feature Film	Bus Stop	Nominated	
Directors Guild of America	1958	Outstanding Directorial Achievement in Theatrical Feature Film	Sayonara	Nominated	
Directors Guild of America	1962	Outstanding Directorial Achievement in Theatrical Feature Film	Fanny	Nominated	
Golden Globe Awards	1956	Best Director	Picnic	Won	
Golden Globe Awards	1958	Best Director	Sayonara	Nominated	
Nastro d'Argento	1957	Best Foreign Film	Picnic	Nominated	
Pulitzer Prize	1950	Drama	South Pacific	Won	
Tony Awards	1948	Best Play	Mister Roberts	Won	
Tony Awards	1948	Best Direction	Mister Roberts	Won	
Tony Awards	1948	Best Author	Mister Roberts	Won	
Tony Awards	1950	Best Musical	South Pacific	Won	
Tony Awards	1950	Best Direction	South Pacific	Won	
Tony Awards	1950	Best Libretto	South Pacific	Won	
Tony Awards	1950	Best Producer (Musical)	South Pacific	Won	
Tony Awards	1953	Best Direction	Picnic	Won	
Tony Awards	1959	Best Play	Epitaph for George Dillon	Nominated	
Tony Awards	1962	Best Direction of a Musical	All American	Nominated	
Venice Film Festival	1956	Golden Lion	Bus Stop	Nominated	
Writers Guild of America	1956	Best Written Comedy	Mister Roberts	Won	

Logan received a star on the Hollywood Walk of Fame for his contributions to motion pictures on 8 February 1960, at 6235 Hollywood Boulevard.

=== Accolades for Logan's films ===
Year	Film	Oscars		BAFTAs		Golden Globes	
Year	Film	Nominations	Wins	Nominations	Wins	Nominations	Wins
1955	Picnic	6	2	4		1	1
1956	Bus Stop	1		1		2	
1957	Sayonara	10	4	1		6	2
1958	South Pacific	3	1			2	
1960	Tall Story					1	1
1961	Fanny	5				4	
1967	Camelot	5	3			6	3
1969	Paint Your Wagon	1				2	
Total		31	10	6		24	7

Directed Academy Award performances

Under Logan's direction, these actors have received Academy Award wins and nominations for their performances in their respective roles.

Year	Performer	Motion Picture	Result
Academy Award for Best Actor
1957	Marlon Brando	Sayonara	Nominated
1961	Charles Boyer	Fanny	Nominated
Academy Award for Best Supporting Actor
1955	Arthur O'Connell	Picnic	Nominated
1956	Don Murray	Bus Stop	Nominated
1957	Red Buttons	Sayonara	Won
Academy Award for Best Supporting Actress
1957	Miyoshi Umeki	Sayonara	Won
