= Gordon Rattray Taylor =

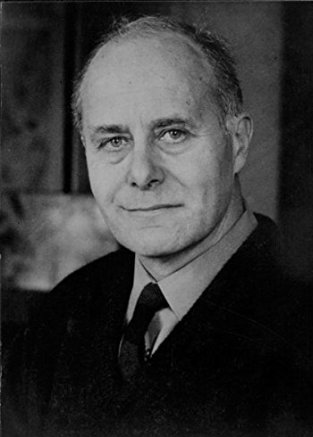
- Born: 11 January 1911
- Died: 7 December 1981 (aged 70)
- Occupations: Journalist, writer

Gordon Rattray Taylor (11 January 1911 – 7 December 1981) was a popular British author and journalist. He is most famous for his 1968 book The Biological Time Bomb, which heralded the rise of biotechnology and for his 1983 book The Great Evolution Mystery, which argued against modern evolutionary theory.

== Biography ==
Gordon Rattray Taylor was born in Eastbourne on 11 January 1911, and educated at Radley College public school, before studying natural sciences at Trinity College, Cambridge. In 1933 he entered journalism. During the war he worked in the Psychological Warfare division of SHAEF. In 1958 he joined the BBC where he wrote and devised science television programmes such as Eye on Research. In 1966 he became a full-time author. He served as a member of the Society for Psychical Research, London (1976–81).

== Writing ==
In The Biological Time Bomb Taylor heralded the advent of artificial insemination, organ transplants, as well as research into memory and controlling moods.

== Evolution ==
Taylor wrote a book on evolution called The Great Evolution Mystery first released in 1983 with a second edition in 1984. Taylor criticized neo-Darwinism, and said that the origin of species and the mechanisms for evolution are still deep mysteries that have not been solved. Taylor supported Lamarck over Darwin.

Taylor discussed the possibility of an inherent self-stabilization of the genome as an important selective factor in evolution. He was supportive of the idea of Lancelot Law Whyte, the evolutionary ideas highlighted in Whyte's book Internal factors of evolution in which no mutation is due entirely to chance: only those that meet the internal demands of the genome can be utilized in evolutionary processes.

Taylor discussed his own evolutionary mechanism called "masking theory" which is the notion that blueprints for building phenotypes can be hidden for millions of years before suddenly being expressed by the species.

The zoologist Mark Ridley states that Taylor appears to have failed to have familiarised himself with Darwinian thinking before criticising it and particularly that Taylor has made the "familiar and elementary" mistake of conflating natural selection with chance. Ridley states that Taylor's alternative to Darwinian evolution is described "only in general outline", involving "Lamarckism and other inarticulated internal factors".

The anthropologist H. James Birx in BioScience wrote that The Great Evolution Mystery is a "stimulating book and raises important questions and encourages future scientific inquiry."

The philosopher Michael Ruse stated that although he did not find Taylor's arguments convincing, he had collected a lot of information and used very good illustrations.

The American novelist Cormac McCarthy read The Great Evolution Mystery and "seems to have taken an interest in the book and to have taken its premises seriously," having included some pointed critiques of Darwinist reasoning in the dialogue of his play The Stonemason.

== Books ==
- Economics for the Exasperated (1948)
- Sex in History: The Past in the Present (1953)
- Conditions of Happiness
- Are Workers Human?
- The Angel Makers
- The Science of Life: A Pictorial History of Biology (1967)
- The Biological Time Bomb (1968) ISBN 0-500-01046-3
- Rethink: A Paraprimitive Solution (1972) ISBN 0-436-51635-7
- Rethink: Radical Proposals to Save a Disintegrating World (1974) ISBN 0-14-021831-9
- The Doomsday Book: Can the World Survive? (1st ed. : 1970 / ed.1972) ISBN 0-586-03604-0, ISBN 0-500-01067-6
- How to Avoid the Future (1975) ISBN 0-436-51637-3
- Salute to British Genius (1978) ISBN 0-436-51637-3
- The Natural History of the Mind (1981) ISBN 0-586-08386-3
- The Great Evolution Mystery (1983)

== See also ==
- History of biotechnology
- Richard Milton
