= Jennifer Dunne =

American ecologist

Jennifer Dunne is an American ecologist whose research focuses on the network structure of food webs. One of 14 scientists who led critical advances in food web research over the last century, according to the journal Food Webs, Dunne uses ecological network research to compare the varying ways humans interact with other species through space and time, providing a quantitative perspective on sustainability of socio-ecological systems.

== Education ==
Dunne attended Harvard University, where she earned an A.B. Cum Laude degree in philosophy, and received an M.A. in ecology and systematic biology from San Francisco State University. She earned her Ph.D. in Energy and Resources from the University of California, Berkeley in 2000 and was a National Science Foundation postdoctoral research fellow in biological informatics.

== Research and career ==
Dunne is recognized as a leader in ecological network research, having made significant contributions toward understanding the dynamics and function of ecological networks through modeling and analysis. Ecological networks capture the complex interactions among species that provide structure to biodiversity.

She is the author of more than 135 scientific publications. In 2025, she has a h-index of 45.

In 2025, Dunne conducts her research at the Santa Fe Institute, where she is a resident professor and also serves as vice president for Science.

=== Achievements ===
In 1998, with co-author Neo Martinez, she published her first work on the roles of time, space, and other scales (e.g., species richness) in food web research. In 2002, she published highly cited articles on the network structure of food webs and on the robustness of trophic networks (food webs) in the face of biodiversity loss through extinction. Dunne and her co-authors have also published influential papers on the dynamics of adaptive feeding in ecological networks, cascading extinctions, paleo-ecological networks reconstructed from a 48-million-year old deposit of Messel shale, and networks reconstructed from the Chengjiang and Burgess Shale assemblages - work which indicates that prehistoric food webs are very similar to modern webs in their network structures.

In 2016, her team published the first highly detailed food web that included humans (the Sanak Island Aleut) in a complex food web with other species. It suggested that the role Sanak Islanders played in their food web, as supergeneralists, had a stabilizing effect on the ecosystem.

She was named Fellow of The Ecological Society of America in 2017 for deep and central contributions to the theory of food web analyses, including its extension to paleo food webs.

Dunne also served as an External Advisor to the National Socio-Environmental Synthesis Center (SESYNC) from 2017 to 2021.

Her research extends the analysis of pre-industrial humans roles in their ecosystems beyond food webs, to include other interactions such as using other species for tools and clothing. It was presented during a Scientific Session at the 2019 annual conference of the American Association for the Advancement of Science.

In 2020, she was named Fellow of the Network Science Society (NetSci) for her "pioneering work elucidating the network structure of ecology, particularly food webs, highlighting the interplay of dynamics and structure of networks."

She has served on the editorial boards of Theory in Biosciences and The SFI Press, and was one of the original senior-level editors at the Journal of Complex Networks, Oxford University Press. She has also served on the steering committee for ASU-SFI Center for Biosocial Complex Systems, and on the Board of Advisors for the science/culture magazine Nautilus.
