= Ernesto Estrada =

Ernesto Estrada may refer to:

- Ernesto Estrada (basketball) (1949–2015), Filipino basketball player
- Ernesto Estrada (scientist) (born 1966), Cuban scientist
