= Cormac McCarthy =

American writer (1933–2023)

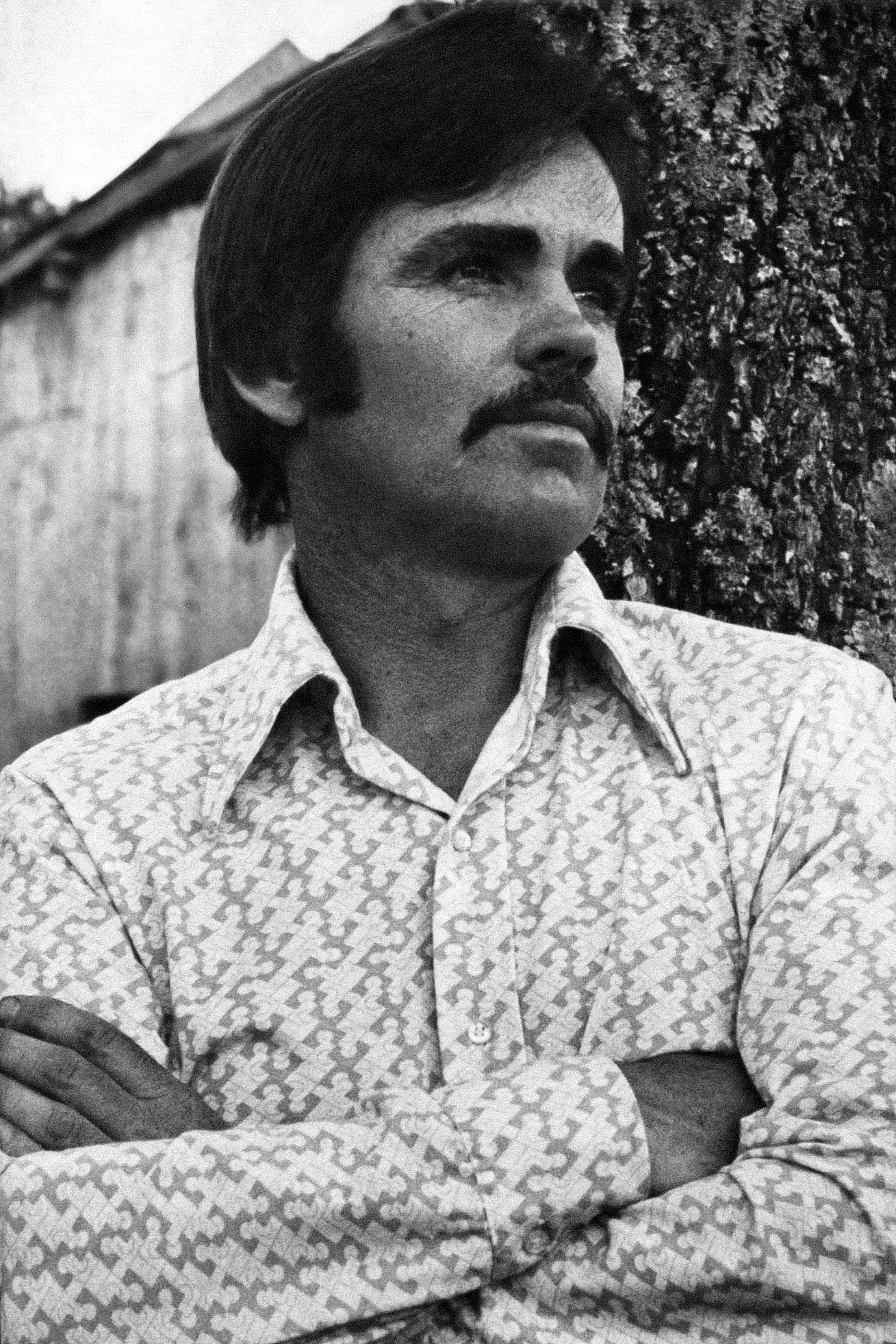
- McCarthy in 1973
- Born: Charles Joseph McCarthy Jr. July 20, 1933; Providence, Rhode Island, U.S.
- Died: June 13, 2023 (aged 89); Santa Fe, New Mexico, U.S.
- Occupations: Novelist; playwright; screenwriter
- Spouses: Lee Holleman (m. 1961; div. 1962) Anne DeLisle (m. 1966; div. 1981) Jennifer Winkley (m. 1997; div. 2006)
- Children: 2
- Writing career
- Genres: Southern gothic; western; post-apocalyptic
- Notable works: Suttree (1979); Blood Meridian (1985); The Border Trilogy (1992–1998); No Country for Old Men (2005); The Road (2006)
- Military career
- Allegiance: United States
- Branch: United States Air Force
- Service years: 1953–1957

Cormac McCarthy (born Charles Joseph McCarthy Jr.; July 20, 1933 – June 13, 2023) was an American author who wrote twelve novels, two plays, five screenplays, and three short stories, spanning the Western, post-apocalyptic, and Southern Gothic genres. His works often include graphic depictions of violence, and his writing style is characterized by a sparse use of punctuation and attribution. He is widely regarded as one of the greatest American novelists.

McCarthy was born in Providence, Rhode Island, although he was raised primarily in Tennessee. In 1951, he enrolled in the University of Tennessee, but dropped out to join the U.S. Air Force. His debut novel, The Orchard Keeper, was published in 1965. Awarded literary grants, McCarthy was able to travel to southern Europe, where he wrote his second novel, Outer Dark (1968). Suttree (1979), like his other early novels, received generally positive reviews, but was not a commercial success. A MacArthur Fellowship enabled him to travel to the American Southwest, where he researched and wrote his fifth novel, Blood Meridian (1985). Although it initially garnered a lukewarm critical and commercial reception, it has since been regarded as his magnum opus, with some labeling it the Great American Novel.

McCarthy first experienced widespread success with All the Pretty Horses (1992), for which he received both the National Book Award and the National Book Critics Circle Award. It was followed by The Crossing (1994) and Cities of the Plain (1998), completing The Border Trilogy. His 2005 novel No Country for Old Men received mixed reviews. His 2006 novel The Road won the 2007 Pulitzer Prize for Fiction and the James Tait Black Memorial Prize for Fiction.

Many of McCarthy's works have been adapted into film. The 2007 film adaptation of No Country for Old Men was a critical and commercial success, winning four Academy Awards, including Best Picture. The films All the Pretty Horses, The Road, and Child of God were also adapted from his works of the same names, and Outer Dark was turned into a 15-minute short. McCarthy had a play adapted into a 2011 film, The Sunset Limited. McCarthy worked with the Santa Fe Institute, a multidisciplinary research center, where he published the essay "The Kekulé Problem" (2017), which explores the human unconscious and the origin of language. He was elected to the American Philosophical Society in 2012. His final novels, The Passenger and Stella Maris, were published on October 25, 2022, and December 6, 2022, respectively.

== Life ==
=== Early life ===
Charles Joseph McCarthy Jr. was born in Providence, Rhode Island, on July 20, 1933, one of six children of Gladys Christina McGrail and Charles Joseph McCarthy. His family was Irish Catholic. In 1937, the family relocated to Knoxville, Tennessee, where his father, a one-time editor of The Yale Law Review, worked as a lawyer for the Tennessee Valley Authority. The family first lived on Noelton Drive in the upscale Sequoyah Hills subdivision, but by 1941, had settled in a house on Martin Mill Pike in South Knoxville. McCarthy later said, "We were considered rich because all the people around us were living in one- or two-room shacks." Among his childhood friends was Jim Long (1930–2012), who was later depicted as J-Bone in Suttree.

McCarthy attended St. Mary's Parochial School and Knoxville Catholic High School, and was an altar boy at Knoxville's Church of the Immaculate Conception. As a child, McCarthy saw no value in school, preferring to pursue his own interests. He described a moment when his teacher asked the class about their hobbies. McCarthy answered eagerly; as he later said, "I was the only one with any hobbies and I had every hobby there was ... name anything, no matter how esoteric. I could have given everyone a hobby and still had 40 or 50 to take home."

In 1951, he began attending the University of Tennessee, studying liberal arts. He became interested in writing after a professor asked him to repunctuate a collection of eighteenth-century essays for inclusion in a textbook. McCarthy left college in 1953 to join the U.S. Air Force. While stationed in Alaska, McCarthy read books voraciously, which he said was the first time he had done so. He also worked as an announcer for Armed Forces Radio. He returned to the University of Tennessee in 1957 on the G.I. Bill, where he majored in English and published two stories, "Wake for Susan" and "A Drowning Incident" in the student literary magazine, The Phoenix, writing under the name C. J. McCarthy, Jr. For these, he won the Ingram-Merrill Award for creative writing in 1959 and 1960. In 1959, McCarthy dropped out of college and left for Chicago.

For the purpose of his writing career, McCarthy changed his first name from Charles to Cormac to avoid confusion, and comparison, with ventriloquist Edgar Bergen's dummy Charlie McCarthy. Cormac had been a family nickname given to his father by his Irish aunts. Other sources say he changed his name to honor the Irish chieftain Cormac MacCarthy, who constructed Blarney Castle.

After marrying fellow student Lee Holleman in 1961, McCarthy moved to what Holleman's obituary calls "a shack with no heat and running water in the foothills of the Smoky Mountains outside of Knoxville." There, the couple had a son, Cullen, in 1962. When writer James Agee's childhood home was being demolished in Knoxville that year, McCarthy used the site's bricks to build fireplaces inside his Sevier County shack. Holleman moved to Wyoming shortly after, where she filed for divorce from McCarthy.

=== Early writing career (1965–1991) ===
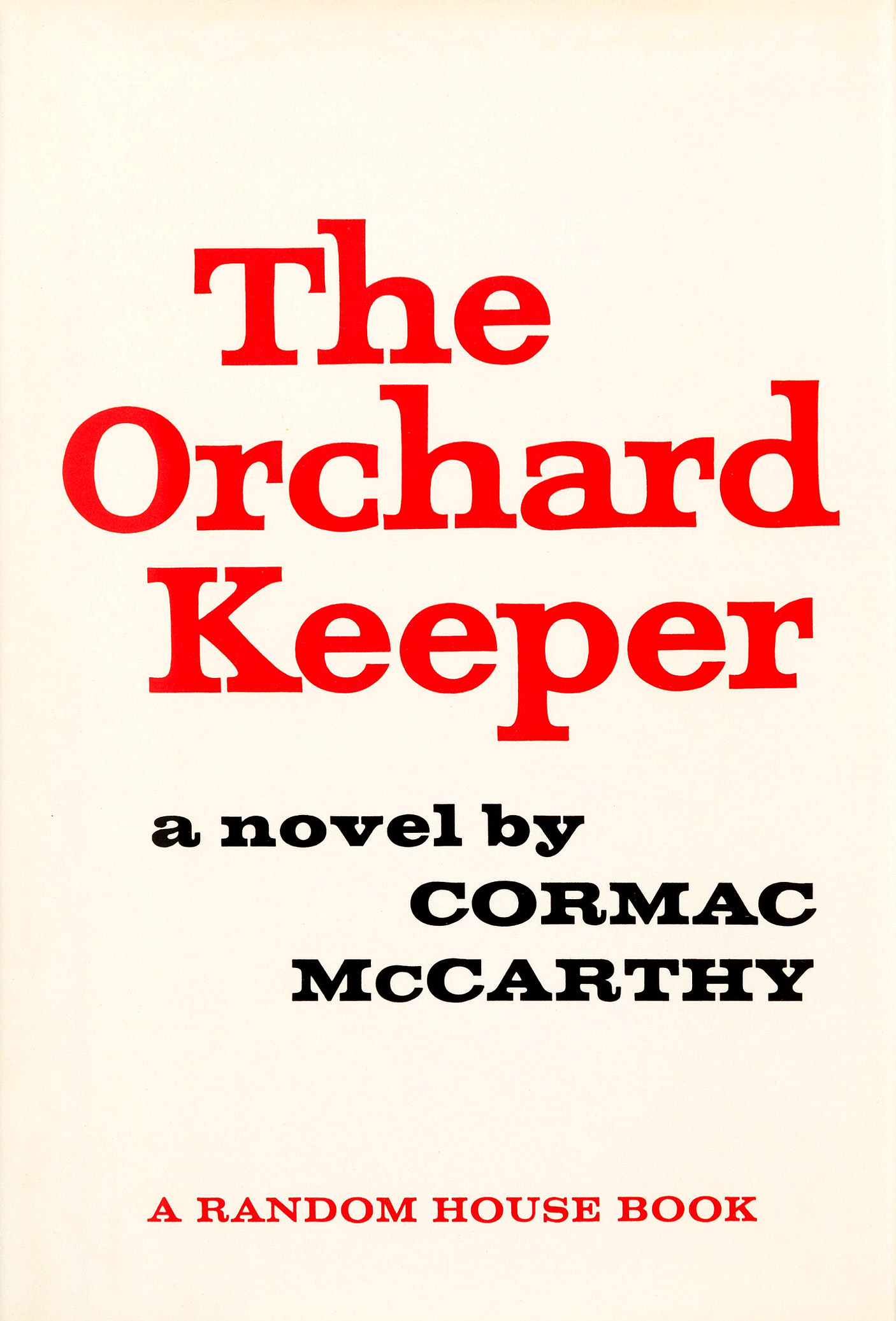
The Orchard Keeper (1965), McCarthy's first novel

In 1965, Random House published McCarthy's first novel, The Orchard Keeper (1965). He had finished the novel while working part time at an auto-parts warehouse in Chicago and submitted the manuscript "blindly" to Albert Erskine of Random House. Erskine continued to edit McCarthy's work for the next 20 years. Upon its release, critics noted its similarity to the work of Faulkner and praised McCarthy's striking use of imagery. The Orchard Keeper won a 1966 William Faulkner Foundation Award for notable first novel.

While living in the French Quarter in New Orleans, McCarthy was evicted from a $40-a-month room for failing to pay his rent. When he traveled the country, McCarthy always carried a 100-watt bulb in his bag so he could read at night, no matter where he was sleeping.

In the summer of 1965, using a Traveling Fellowship award from The American Academy of Arts and Letters, McCarthy shipped out aboard the liner Sylvania hoping to visit Ireland. On the ship, he met Englishwoman Anne DeLisle, who was working on the ship as a dancer and singer. In 1966, they were married in England. Also in 1966, he received a Rockefeller Foundation grant, which he used to travel around Southern Europe before landing in Ibiza, where he wrote his second novel, Outer Dark (1968). Afterward, he returned to the United States with his wife, where Outer Dark was published to generally favorable reviews.

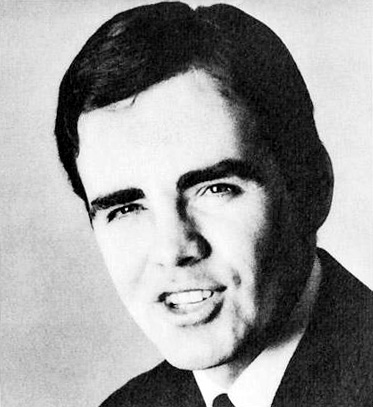
McCarthy (age 35; 1968).

In 1969, the couple moved to Louisville, Tennessee, and purchased a dairy barn, which McCarthy renovated, doing the stonework himself. According to DeLisle, the couple lived in "total poverty", bathing in a lake. DeLisle claimed, "Someone would call up and offer him $2,000 to come speak at a university about his books. And he would tell them that everything he had to say was there on the page. So we would eat beans for another week." While living in the barn, he wrote his next book, Child of God (1973). Like Outer Dark before it, Child of God was set in southern Appalachia. In 1976, McCarthy separated from Anne DeLisle and moved to El Paso, Texas.

In 1974, Richard Pearce of PBS contacted McCarthy and asked him to write the screenplay for an episode of Visions, a television drama series. Beginning in early 1975, and armed with only "a few photographs in the footnotes to a 1928 biography of a famous pre-Civil War industrialist William Gregg as inspiration," McCarthy and Pearce spent a year traveling the South to research the subject of industrialization there. McCarthy completed the screenplay in 1976 and the episode, titled The Gardener's Son, aired on January 6, 1977. Numerous film festivals abroad screened it. The episode was nominated for two Primetime Emmy awards in 1977.

In 1976, when McCarthy was 42, he met then-16-year-old Finnish-American Augusta Britt at a motel in Arizona. Despite their age difference, the two bonded immediately, and he drew upon their experiences for Suttree, his work-in-progress at the time. By the following year, in 1977, when he was 43, but she was still 17, on a shared trip to Mexico, they had progressed to a physical relationship. They remained friends until his death.

In 1979, McCarthy published his semiautobiographical Suttree, which he had written over a 20-year period, based on his experiences in Knoxville on the Tennessee River. Jerome Charyn likened it to a doomed Huckleberry Finn, noting how the Yew tree of the author's sprawling Tennessee garden was inspiration for the "christening of what became the principal character's name."

In 1981, McCarthy was awarded a MacArthur Fellowship worth $236,000. Saul Bellow, Shelby Foote, and others had recommended him to the organization. The grant enabled him to travel the American Southwest to research his next novel, Blood Meridian, or the Evening Redness in the West (1985). The book is violent, with The New York Times declaring it the "bloodiest book since the Iliad". Although initially snubbed by many critics, the book later grew appreciably in stature in literary circles; Harold Bloom called Blood Meridian "the greatest single book since Faulkner's As I Lay Dying". In a 2006 poll of authors and publishers conducted by The New York Times Magazine to list the greatest American novels of the previous quarter-century, Blood Meridian placed third, behind Toni Morrison's Beloved (1987) and Don DeLillo's Underworld (1997). Some have even suggested it is the Great American Novel. Time included it on their 2005 list of the 100 best English-language books published since 1923. At the time, McCarthy was living in a stone cottage behind an El Paso shopping center, which he described as "barely habitable".

As of 1991, none of McCarthy's novels had sold more than 5,000 hardcover copies, and "for most of his career, he did not even have an agent". He was labeled the "best unknown novelist in America".

=== Success and acclaim (1992–2013) ===
External videos
- McCarthy's 2007 interview with Oprah Winfrey (5:51) via Oprah.com

After working with McCarthy for 20 years, Albert Erskine retired from Random House in 1992. McCarthy turned to Alfred A. Knopf, where he fell under the editorial advisement of Gary Fisketjon. As a final favor to Erskine, McCarthy agreed to do an interview with Richard B. Woodward of The New York Times. He had done earlier, smaller interviews back in the 60s and 70s.

McCarthy finally received widespread recognition following the publication of All the Pretty Horses (1992), when it won the National Book Award and the National Book Critics Circle Award. It became a New York Times bestseller, selling 190,000 hardcover copies within six months. It was followed by The Crossing (1994) and Cities of the Plain (1998), completing the Border Trilogy. In the midst of this trilogy came The Stonemason (first performed in 1995), his second dramatic work. McCarthy originally conceived his next work, No Country for Old Men (2005), as a screenplay before turning it into a novel. Consequently, the novel has little description of setting and is composed largely of dialogue. A western set in the 1980s, No Country for Old Men was adapted by the Coen brothers into a 2007 film of the same name, which won four Academy Awards and more than 75 film awards globally.

In the early 2000s, while staying at an El Paso motel with his young son, McCarthy looked out the window late one night and imagined what the city might look like in fifty or one hundred years and saw "fires up on the hill and everything being laid to waste". He wrote two pages covering the idea; four years later in Ireland he expanded the idea into his tenth novel, The Road, which follows a lone father and his young son traveling through a post-apocalyptic America, hunted by cannibals. Many of the discussions between the two were verbatim conversations McCarthy had had with his son. Released in 2006, it won international acclaim and the Pulitzer Prize for Fiction. McCarthy did not accept the prize in person, instead sending Sonny Mehta in his place. John Hillcoat directed the 2009 film adaptation, written by Joe Penhall, and starring Viggo Mortensen and Kodi Smit-McPhee, which received mostly favorable reviews.

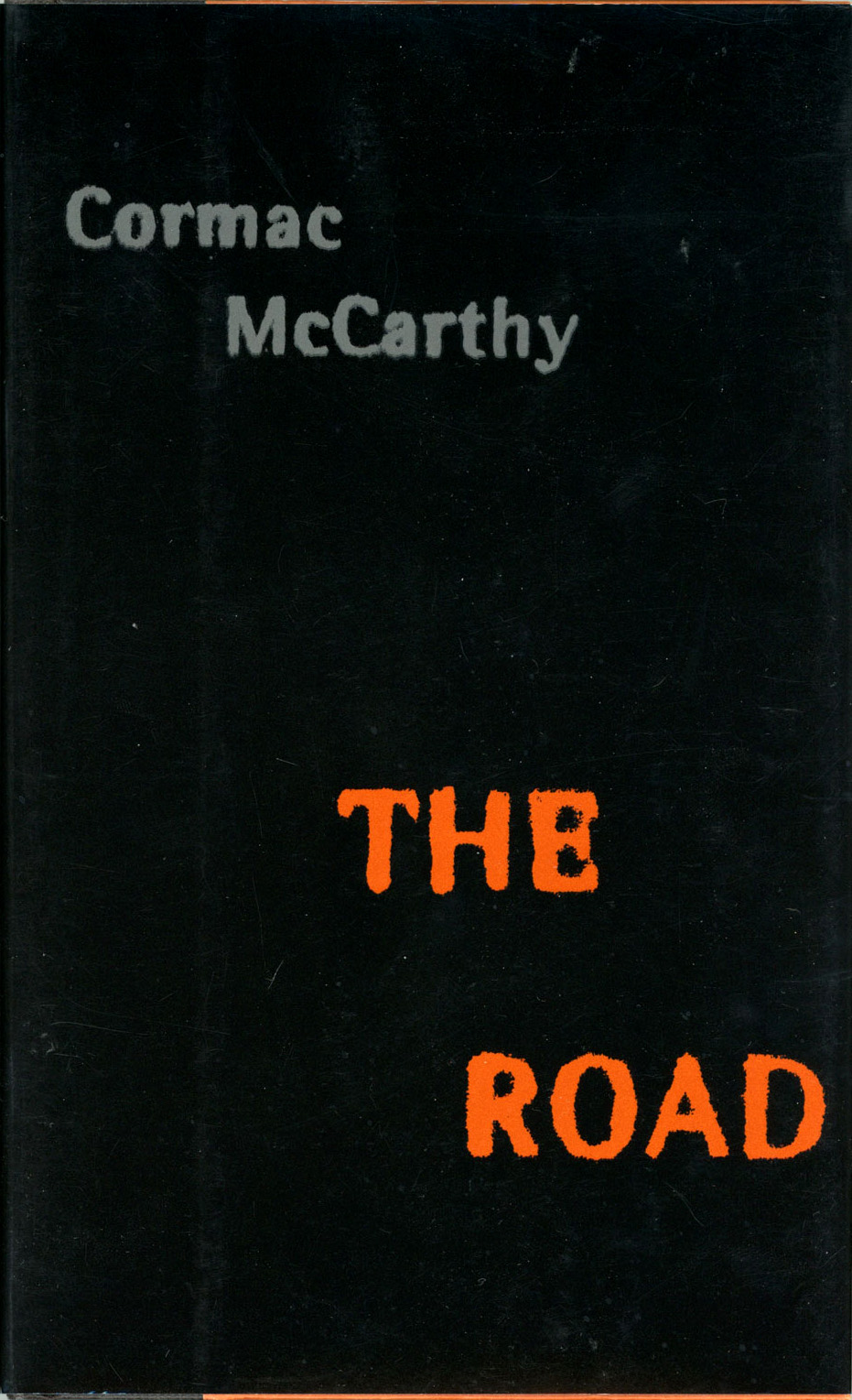
First edition of McCarthy's tenth novel, The Road (2006), for which he received the Pulitzer Prize for Fiction

McCarthy published the play The Sunset Limited in 2006. Critics noted it was unorthodox and may have had more in common with a novel, hence McCarthy's subtitle: "a novel in dramatic form". He later adapted it into a screenplay for a 2011 film, directed and executive produced by Tommy Lee Jones, who also starred opposite Samuel L. Jackson.

Oprah Winfrey selected McCarthy's The Road as the April 2007 selection for her Book Club. As a result, McCarthy agreed to his first television interview, which aired on The Oprah Winfrey Show on June 5, 2007. The interview took place in the library of the Santa Fe Institute. McCarthy told Winfrey that he did not know any writers and much preferred the company of scientists. During the interview, he related several stories illustrating the degree of outright poverty he endured at times during his career as a writer. He also spoke about the experience of fathering a child at an advanced age, and how his son was the inspiration for The Road.

In 2012, McCarthy sold his original screenplay The Counselor to Nick Wechsler, Paula Mae Schwartz, and Steve Schwartz, who had previously produced the film adaptation of McCarthy's novel The Road. Directed by Ridley Scott, with the production finished in 2012, the film was released on October 25, 2013, to polarized critical reception. Mark Kermode of The Guardian found it "datedly naff", and Peter Travers of Rolling Stone described it as "a droning meditation on capitalism". However, Manohla Dargis of The New York Times found it "terrifying" and "seductive".

=== Santa Fe Institute (2014–2023) ===
McCarthy was a trustee for the Santa Fe Institute (SFI), a multidisciplinary research center devoted to the study of complex adaptive systems. Unlike most members of the SFI, McCarthy did not have a scientific background. As Murray Gell-Mann explained, "There isn't any place like the Santa Fe Institute, and there isn't any writer like Cormac, so the two fit quite well together." From his work at the Santa Fe Institute, McCarthy published his first piece of nonfiction writing in his 50-year writing career. In the essay entitled "The Kekulé Problem" (2017), McCarthy analyzes a dream of August Kekulé's as a model of the unconscious mind and the origins of language. He theorizes about the nature of the unconscious mind and its separation from human language. The unconscious, according to McCarthy, "is a machine for operating an animal" and "all animals have an unconscious". McCarthy postulates that language is a purely human cultural creation and not a biologically determined phenomenon.

In 2015, McCarthy's next novel, The Passenger, was announced at a multimedium event hosted in Santa Fe by the Lannan Foundation. The book was influenced by his time among scientists; it has been described by SFI biologist David Krakauer as "full-blown Cormac 3.0—a mathematical [and] analytical novel". In March 2022, The New York Times reported that The Passenger would be released on October 25, 2022, and a second companion novel, Stella Maris, on November 22. The latter was McCarthy's first novel since Outer Dark to feature a female protagonist.

At the time of his death, McCarthy was listed as an executive producer on a film adaption of Blood Meridian, to be directed by John Hillcoat, who previously directed the film adaptation of The Road. In a 2024 interview, Hillcoat said he and McCarthy spent extended time discussing the film, which the author once volunteered to write and envisioned as a "Faustian tale, the journey of the Judge trying to win the soul of the kid, and consume everything in his path." McCarthy had rejected a miniseries proposal, finding television lacks a "kind of grandeur about it, an element of scale."

== Writing approach and style ==
=== Syntax ===
He left the beer on the counter and went out and got the two packs of cigarettes and the binoculars and the pistol and slung the .270 over his shoulder and shut the truck door and came back in.

— Cormac McCarthy's polysyndetic use of "and" in No Country for Old Men

McCarthy used punctuation sparsely, even replacing most commas with "and" to create polysyndetons; it has been called "the most important word in McCarthy's lexicon". He told Oprah Winfrey that he preferred "simple declarative sentences" and that he used capital letters, periods, an occasional comma, or a colon for setting off a list; he never used semicolons, which he labeled as "idiocy". He did not use quotation marks for dialogue and believed there is no reason to "blot the page up with weird little marks". Prof. Erik Hage notes that McCarthy's dialogue often lacks attribution, but that "somehow ... the reader remains oriented as to who is speaking." His attitude to punctuation dated to some editing work he did for a professor of English while enrolled at the University of Tennessee; he stripped out much of the punctuation in the book being edited, which pleased the professor. McCarthy edited fellow Santa Fe Institute Fellow W. Brian Arthur's influential article "Increasing Returns and the New World of Business", published in the Harvard Business Review in 1996, removing commas from the text. He also copy edited work for physicists Lawrence M. Krauss and Lisa Randall.

Saul Bellow praised his "absolutely overpowering use of language, his life-giving and death-dealing sentences". Richard B. Woodward has described his writing as "reminiscent of early Hemingway". Unlike earlier works such as Suttree and Blood Meridian, the majority of McCarthy's work after 1993 uses simple, restrained vocabulary.

=== Themes ===
There's no such thing as life without bloodshed. The notion that the species can be improved in some way, that everyone could live in harmony, is a really dangerous idea. Those who are afflicted with this notion are the first ones to give up their souls, their freedom. Your desire that it be that way will enslave you and make your life vacuous.

— Cormac McCarthy, interviewed in the New York Times (April 19, 1992)

McCarthy's novels often depict explicit violence. Many of his works have been characterized as nihilistic, particularly Blood Meridian. Some academics dispute this, saying Blood Meridian is actually a gnostic tragedy. His later works have been characterized as highly moralistic. Erik J. Wielenberg argues that The Road depicts morality as secular and originating from individuals, such as the father, and separate from God.

The bleak outlook of the future, and the inhuman foreign antagonist Anton Chigurh of No Country for Old Men, is said to reflect the apprehension of the post-9/11 era. Many of his works portray individuals in conflict with society and acting on instinct rather than on emotion or thought. Another theme throughout many of McCarthy's works is the ineptitude or inhumanity of those in authority and particularly in law enforcement. This is seen in Blood Meridian with the murder spree the Glanton Gang initiates because of the bounties, the "overwhelmed" law enforcement in No Country for Old Men, and the corrupt police officers in All the Pretty Horses. As a result, he has been labeled the "great pessimist of American literature".

=== Bilingual narrative practice ===
McCarthy was fluent in Spanish, having lived in Ibiza, Spain in the 1960s and later residing in El Paso, Texas and Santa Fe, New Mexico. Isabel Soto argues that after he learned the language, "Spanish and English modulate or permeate each other" in his novels, as it was "an essential part of McCarthy's expressive discourse". Katherine Sugg observes that McCarthy's writing is "often considered a 'multicultural' and 'bilingual' narrative practice, particularly for its abundant use of untranslated Spanish dialogue". Jeffrey Herlihy-Mera observes "John Grady Cole is a native speaker of Spanish. This is also the case of several other important characters in the Border Trilogy, including Billy Parhnam [sic], John Grady's mother (and possibly his grandfather and brothers), and perhaps Jimmy Blevins, each of whom are speakers of Spanish who were ostensibly born in the US political space into families with what are generally considered English-speaking surnames ... This is also the case of Judge Holden in Blood Meridian."

=== Work ethic and process ===
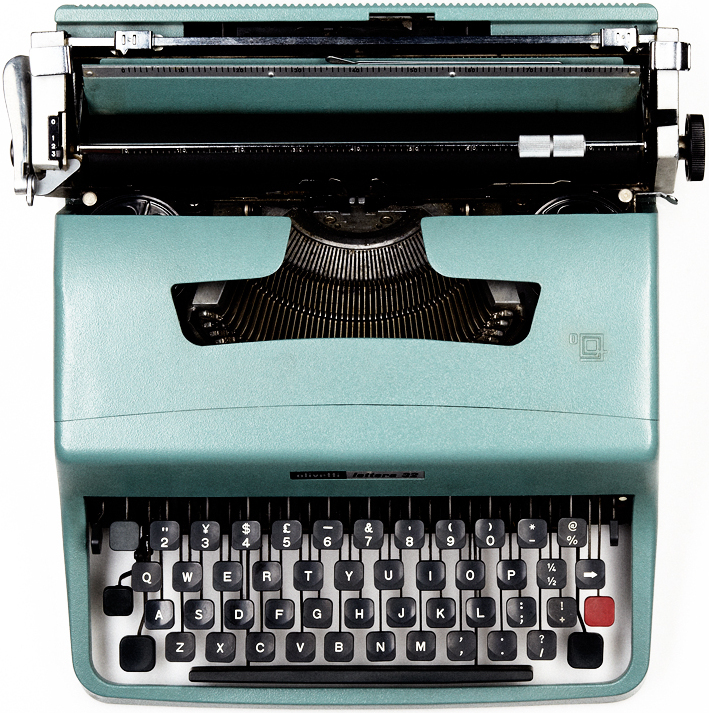
McCarthy wrote all of his fiction and correspondence with a single Olivetti Lettera 32 typewriter between the early 1960s and 2009. At that time he replaced it with an identical model.

McCarthy dedicated himself to writing full time, choosing not to work other jobs to support his career. "I always knew that I didn't want to work", McCarthy said. "You have to be dedicated, but it was my number-one priority." Early in his career, his decision not to work sometimes subjected him and his family to poverty.

Nevertheless, according to scholar Steve Davis, McCarthy had an "incredible work ethic". He preferred to work on several projects simultaneously and said, for instance, that he had four drafts in progress in the mid-2000s and for several years devoted about two hours every day to each project (“this was unusual”) (per the source). He was known to conduct exhaustive research on the historical settings and regional environments found in his fiction. He edited his own writing, sometimes revising a book over the course of years or decades before deeming it fit for publication. While his research and revision were meticulous, he did not outline his plots and instead viewed writing as a "subconscious process" which should be given space for spontaneous inspiration.

After 1958, McCarthy wrote all of his literary work and correspondence with a mechanical typewriter. He originally used a Royal but went looking for a more lightweight machine ahead of a trip to Europe in the early 1960s. He bought a portable Olivetti Lettera 32 for $50 at a Knoxville pawn shop and typed about five million words over the next five decades. He maintained it by simply "blowing out the dust with a service station hose". Book dealer Glenn Horowitz said the modest typewriter acquired "a sort of talismanic quality" through its connection to McCarthy's monumental fiction, "as if Mount Rushmore was carved with a Swiss Army knife". His Olivetti was auctioned in December 2009 at Christie's, with the auction house estimating it would fetch between $15,000 and $20,000. It sold for $254,500, with proceeds donated to the Santa Fe Institute. McCarthy replaced it with an identical model, bought for him by his friend John Miller for $11 plus $19.95 for shipping.

== Personal life and views ==
McCarthy was a teetotaler. According to Richard B. Woodward, "McCarthy doesn't drink anymore – he quit 16 years ago [i.e. in 1976] in El Paso, with one of his young girlfriends – and Suttree reads like a farewell to that life. 'The friends I do have are simply those who quit drinking,' he says. 'If there is an occupational hazard to writing, it's drinking'." However, his long-time friend Augusta Britt claimed that he had resumed drinking near the end of his life.

In the 1980s, McCarthy and Edward Abbey considered covertly releasing wolves into southern Arizona to restore their decimated population.

In the late 1990s, McCarthy moved to Tesuque, New Mexico, north of Santa Fe, with his third wife, Jennifer Winkley, and their son, John. McCarthy and Winkley divorced in 2006.

In 2013, Scottish writer Michael Crossan created a Twitter account impersonating McCarthy, quickly amassing several thousand followers and recognition by site owner Jack Dorsey. Five hours after the account's creation, McCarthy's publisher confirmed that the account was fake and that McCarthy did not own a computer. In 2018, another account impersonating McCarthy was created. In 2021, it was briefly marked verified following a viral tweet, after which his agent confirmed that the account was again a fake.

In 2016, a hoax spread on Twitter claiming that McCarthy had died, with USA Today even repeating the information. The Los Angeles Times responded to the hoax with the headline, "Cormac McCarthy isn't dead. He's too tough to die."

=== Politics ===
McCarthy did not publicly reveal his political opinions. A resident of Santa Fe with a traditionalist disposition, he once expressed disapproval of the city and the people there: "If you don't agree with them politically, you can't just agree to disagree—they think you're crazy." Academic David Holloway writes that "McCarthy's writing can be read as either liberal or conservative, or as both simultaneously, depending on the politics that readers themselves bring with them to the act of reading the work".

=== Science and literature ===
In one of his few interviews, McCarthy revealed that he respected only authors who "deal with issues of life and death", citing Henry James and Marcel Proust as examples of writers who do not. "I don't understand them ... To me, that's not literature. A lot of writers who are considered good I consider strange", he said. Regarding his own literary constraints when writing novels, McCarthy said he was "not a fan of some of the Latin American writers, magical realism. You know, it's hard enough to get people to believe what you're telling them without making it impossible. It has to be vaguely plausible." Moby-Dick (1851) was his favorite novel. Along with Moby-Dick, McCarthy regarded The Brothers Karamazov (1880), Ulysses (1922), and The Sound and the Fury (1929) as "great" novels.

Socially, McCarthy had an aversion to other writers, preferring the company of scientists. He voiced his admiration for scientific advances: "What physicists did in the 20th century was one of the extraordinary flowerings ever in the human enterprise." McCarthy considered himself a materialist. At MacArthur reunions, McCarthy shunned his fellow writers to fraternize instead with scientists like physicist Murray Gell-Mann and whale biologist Roger Payne. Of all of his interests, McCarthy stated, "Writing is way, way down at the bottom of the list."

=== Death ===
McCarthy died at his home in Santa Fe on June 13, 2023, at the age of 89. Stephen King said McCarthy was "maybe the greatest American novelist of my time ... He was full of years and created a fine body of work, but I still mourn his passing."

=== Augusta Britt ===
In 2024, Vanity Fair published an article about McCarthy's 47-year relationship with a woman named Augusta Britt, whom he met when he was 42 and she was 16. Britt, according to the article, was living in a foster home at the time, and had been in and out of foster homes for the previous five years.

The Vanity Fair piece claims that in 1977, when Britt was 17, McCarthy forged her birth certificate and took her to Mexico; this was also when he began having sex with her. Britt says that this trip, from El Paso to Juarez, was initiated after McCarthy received word from editor Albert Erskine that the FBI was looking for them and that McCarthy "was wanted for statutory rape and the Mann Act."

Despite this, Britt maintains throughout the Vanity Fair article that the relationship was neither predatory nor abusive. They maintained close contact until McCarthy's death in 2023.

== Legacy ==
In 2003, literary critic Harold Bloom named McCarthy as one of the four major living American novelists, alongside Don DeLillo, Thomas Pynchon, and Philip Roth. Bloom's 1994 book The Western Canon had listed Child of God, Suttree, and Blood Meridian among the works of contemporary literature he predicted would endure and become "canonical". Bloom reserved his highest praise for Blood Meridian, which he called "the greatest single book since Faulkner's As I Lay Dying", and though he held less esteem for McCarthy's other novels he said that "to have written even one book so authentically strong and allusive, and capable of the perpetual reverberation that Blood Meridian possesses more than justifies him. ... He has attained genius with that book."

A comprehensive archive of McCarthy's personal papers is preserved at the Wittliff Collections, Texas State University, San Marcos, Texas. The McCarthy papers consists of 98 boxes (46 linear feet). The acquisition of the Cormac McCarthy Papers resulted from years of ongoing conversations between McCarthy and Southwestern Writers Collection founder, Bill Wittliff, who negotiated the proceedings. The Southwestern Writers Collection/Wittliff Collections also holds The Woolmer Collection of Cormac McCarthy, which consists of letters between McCarthy and bibliographer J. Howard Woolmer, and four other related collections.

== The Cormac McCarthy Library Project ==
When McCarthy died in June 2023, he left behind an enormous library of roughly 20,000 books, many annotated with margin comments handwritten by McCarthy himself. McCarthy was a very private figure who rarely spoke on his work or the books and authors who influenced it, so some researchers believe the library he left behind, in particular the annotations, may offer invaluable insight into his life and work.

The Cormac McCarthy Library Project plans to create an Open Access searchable online database with information about each of the volumes in McCarthy's collection with the goal of making the database accessible to anyone, anywhere, without restrictions. In the meantime, thousands of books from the collection have been given to the University of Tennessee and will be made available to checkout by students and scholars at its library.

An article about McCarthy's library was published in the September/October 2025 issue of Smithsonian Magazine.

== Published works ==
Novels

#	Denotes an entry in The Border Trilogy	#	Denotes an entry in The Passenger Series

Title	Notes	Publication	ISBN	Ref(s)
The Orchard Keeper		1965	ISBN 0-679-72872-4	
Outer Dark		1968	ISBN 0-679-72873-2	
Child of God		1973	ISBN 0-679-72874-0	
Suttree		1979	ISBN 0-679-73632-8	
Blood Meridian or The Evening Redness in the West		1985	ISBN 0-679-72875-9	
All the Pretty Horses	Book 1 in The Border Trilogy	1992	ISBN 0-679-74439-8	
The Crossing	Book 2 in The Border Trilogy	1994	ISBN 0-679-76084-9	
Cities of the Plain	Book 3 in The Border Trilogy	1998	ISBN 0-679-74719-2	
No Country for Old Men		2005	ISBN 0-375-70667-4	
The Road		2006	ISBN 0-307-38789-5	
The Passenger	Book 1 in The Passenger Series	2022	ISBN 0-307-26899-3	
Stella Maris	Book 2 in The Passenger Series	2022	ISBN 0-307-26900-0	
