= David Krakauer =

David Krakauer may refer to:

- David Krakauer (musician)
- David Krakauer (scientist)
