= Ernesto Estrada (scientist) =

Cuban-Spanish scientist

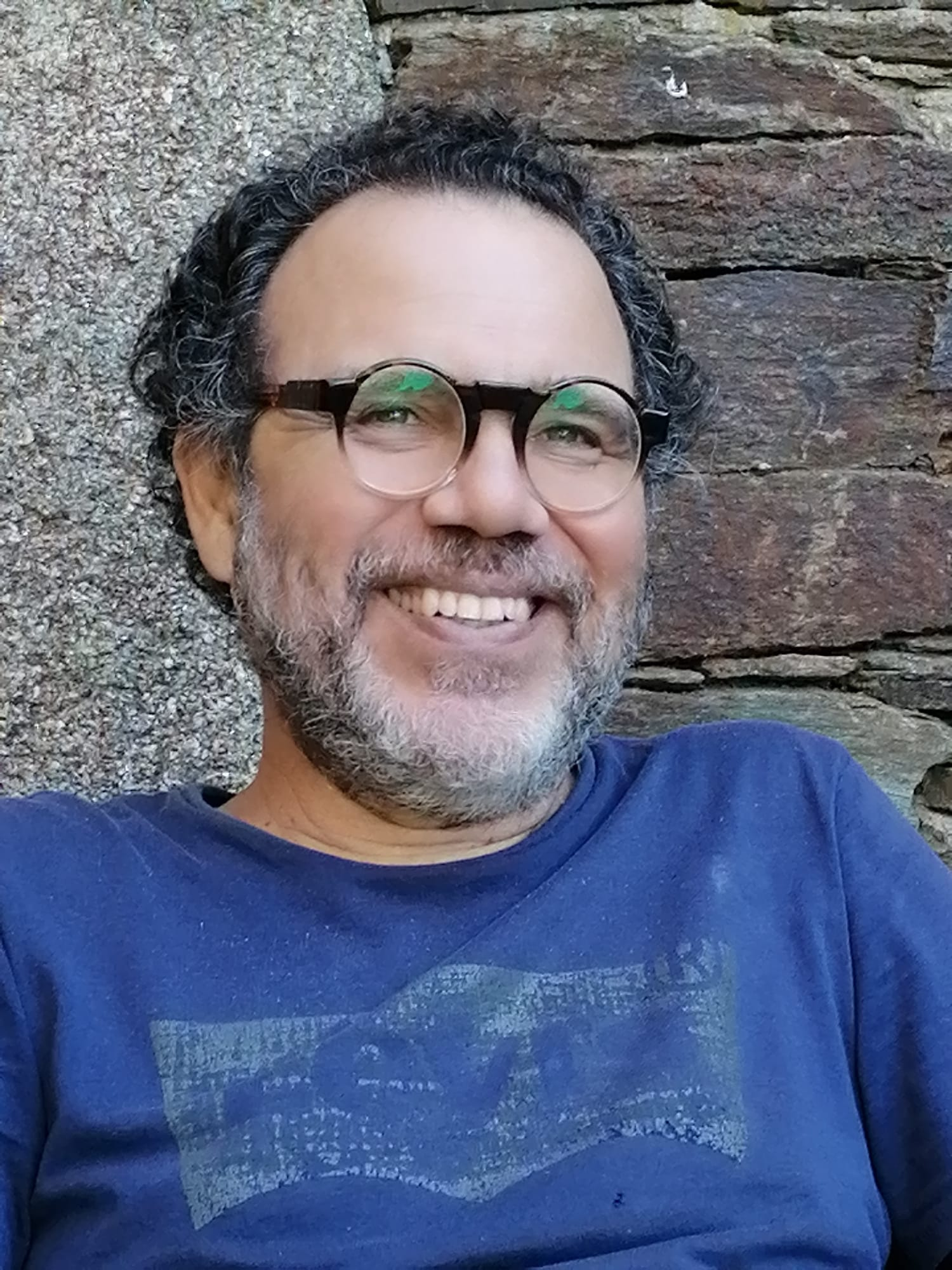
- Born: 2 May 1966 (age 60); Sancti Spiritus, Cuba

Ernesto Estrada (born 2 May 1966) is a Cuban-Spanish scientist. He has been Senior ARAID Researcher at the Institute of Mathematics and Applications at the University of Zaragoza, Spain since 2019. Before that he was the chair in Complexity Science, and full professor at the Department of Mathematics and Statistics of the University of Strathclyde, Glasgow, United Kingdom. He is known by his contributions in different disciplines, including mathematical chemistry and complex network theory.

== Birth and education ==
Estrada was born in the city of Sancti Spiritus, in the central region of Cuba. Since the age of 11 he studied in a school which specialized in exact sciences. He later studied for a technical degree in Analytical chemistry in the technological institute IPQI Mártires de Girón Havana. At the age of 18 years, and before entering the university, he presented his first scientific paper in an international congress together with his mentor, Dr. Jose F. Fernández-Bertrán. The paper was about the detection of polyatomic anions in matrices of NaCl using Infrared spectroscopy. Between 1985 and 1990, he studied chemical sciences at the Central University of Las Villas in Santa Clara, Cuba, where he obtained his degree in only 4 of the 5 years established for the program. In the first years after graduation, Estrada investigated on the organic synthesis and the use of spectroscopy for the characterization of new chemical entities with pharmacological activity. This research introduced him to the world of Computational chemistry due to the requirement of using efficient methods for drug design and drug discovery. He is one of the co-authors of the patent for the bactericide and fungicide drug Furvina. In 1997, he obtained his PhD in Mathematical chemistry under the direction of Luis A. Montero Cabrera on the topic of "Graph Theory Applied to Molecular Design".

== Academic career ==
After completing his PhD, Estrada spent some time as Research fellow at the University of Valencia, Spain with Prof. Jorge Galvez working on drug design and at the Hebrew University of Jerusalem with Prof. David Avnir working on molecular symmetry numbers and rotational partition functions. In 2000, he emigrated to Spain. Between 2002 and 2003, Estrada worked as a scientist at the Safety and Environmental Assurance Centre, Unilever in Colworth, U.K. He then obtained a position as "Ramón y Cajal" researcher at the University of Santiago de Compostela, Spain. Between 2008 and 2018, Estrada occupied the chair in Complexity Science at the University of Strathclyde. In 2019 he became ARAID Researcher at the University of Zaragoza. In 2021 he incorporated to the IFISC research staff.

== Research and achievements ==
Estrada has been a major contributor in the study of complex networks, where he has developed several approaches to investigate the network topology and network dynamics. An index introduced by him in 1999 to characterize the degree of protein folding, and then generalized to the study of complex networks in 2005, is nowadays widely known as the Estrada index of a graph or network. Estrada is also known in the field of spectral graph theory where he has introduced several approaches to characterize the organizational architecture of Complex networks, such as the "subgraph centrality", "communicability", "spectral scaling", among others. His generalization of the discrete Laplace operator, as the d-path Laplacians and their transforms, has opened several new avenues for studying long-range interactions in network dynamics.

Estrada is also known in the area of mathematical chemistry, in particular for the development and use of molecular descriptors based on the use of Graph Theory. In recent years he has developed mathematical approaches for the Hückel method or tight binding model, such as for "graph energy", "density matrix", "quantum molecular interference" in molecular electronics, among others. The last work is in collaboration with Roald Hoffmann.

== Awards and Distinctions ==
- 2005, Elected Member of the International Academy of Mathematical Chemistry.
- 2007, Recipient of the Prize as Outstanding Scientist, International Academy of Mathematical Chemistry in recognition for "his valuable contributions in developing and applying graph theory to solve problems in many interdisciplinary areas, such as chemistry, physics, biology, ecology and technology".
- 2014, Recipient of the Royal Society Wolfson Research Merit Award of the Royal Society of London, which recognises "scientists of outstanding achievement and potential".
- 2014, Elected as Member of the Academia Europaea.
- 2019, Elected as Member of the Latin American Academy of Science.
- 2019, Elected SIAM Fellow "for outstanding contributions to mathematical chemistry and network science".

== Editorial Activities ==
- Editor-in-Chief, Journal of Complex Networks, Oxford University Press.
- Editorial Board, MATCH. Communications in Mathematical and in Computer Chemistry.
- Editorial Board, SIAM Journal on Applied Mathematics.
- Editorial Board, Proceedings of the Royal Society, A.
- Editorial Board, Mathematics.

== Books ==
- 2011. The Structure of Complex Networks. Theory and Applications. Oxford University Press.
- 2015. A First Course in Network Theory. Oxford University Press, with P. Knight.
