= Slánský =

Slansky or Slánský is a surname. Notable people with the surname include:

- Richard Slansky (1940–1998), American theoretical physicist
- Rudolf Slánský (1901–1952), Czech Communist politician
- Rudolf Slánský Jr., Czech diplomat

== See also ==
- Slánský trial, 1952 show trial in Czechoslovakia
