= The Passenger (McCarthy novel) =

2022 novel by Cormac McCarthy

- Author: Cormac McCarthy
- Audio read by: MacLeod Andrews; Julia Whelan
- Language: English
- Publisher: Alfred A. Knopf
- Publication date: October 25, 2022
- Publication place: United States
- Media type: Print
- Pages: 383
- ISBN: 978-0-307-26899-0
- Preceded by: The Road
- Followed by: Stella Maris

The Passenger is a 2022 novel by the American writer Cormac McCarthy. It was released six weeks before its companion novel Stella Maris. The plot of both The Passenger and Stella Maris follows Bobby and Alicia Western, two siblings whose father helped develop the atomic bomb.

The Passenger was McCarthy's first novel since The Road, sixteen years prior. McCarthy had been writing The Passenger intermittently since 1980. It was generally well received by critics.

== Plot ==
The novel follows Bobby Western, a salvage diver, across the Gulf of Mexico and the American South. Western is haunted by his father's contributions to the development of the atomic bomb, and tormented by his inability to save his sister Alicia—the protagonist of the novel's sequel, Stella Maris—from suicide, which happens a decade before The Passenger takes place. Alicia was a mathematics prodigy who worked under the tutelage of Alexander Grothendieck (a real mathematician who shunned the field at the peak of his influence and chose to live in relative seclusion). The Western siblings grow up in east Tennessee as their father works at Oak Ridge on the Manhattan Project (with luminary physicist J. Robert Oppenheimer). Both children are math prodigies; Alicia studies at the University of Chicago while Bobby drops out of Caltech to pursue a career as a Formula 2 race car driver in Europe, though a serious crash puts him in a temporary coma and ends his driving career. The events of the novel are punctuated with short, italicized chapters about Alicia's treatment for schizophrenia due to hallucinations of a deformed figure the narrator named "Thalidomide Kid" who perpetually teases and belittles her and summons his ghostly cohorts to perform unwanted and garish entertainment acts.

Following a salvage dive to recover any survivors from a submerged airplane, Bobby discovers that the pilot's flight bag and data box are missing. Within a few days, he returns to his apartment to find two agents of some kind who ask questions about the submerged airplane and the missing items, and Western learns there was also a missing tenth passenger.

Western spends time in bars and restaurants in New Orleans with old friends discussing science and philosophy. He visits his grandmother in Tennessee. Her house had been ransacked two years prior, and his father's research papers and all family records were taken. Now in hiding from the authorities on the advice of Kline (a private investigator), Western has his 1973 Maserati Bora seized and his bank account frozen by the I.R.S., ostensibly for failing to record in his taxes the money he inherited from his paternal grandmother. Left destitute, Western drifts across the country as a transient, eventually coming to reside in Formentera. At the end of the novel, Western lies in his bed in a windmill penning a letter to his sister, the love of his life. He has forgotten her face and believes he will see it again when he dies.

== Development ==
It was thought that McCarthy first began writing The Passenger in the 1970s, working on it intermittently over the following decades. However, according to The Cambridge Companion to Cormac McCarthy, he began drafting the novel in 1980.

In 2009, notes relating to his next novel were found in the McCarthy archive at Texas State University. McCarthy told the Wall Street Journal that same year that his next book would be "set in New Orleans around 1980. It has to do with a brother and sister. When the book opens she's already committed suicide, and it's about how he deals with it. She's an interesting girl."

In 2015, the novel The Passenger was officially announced at a multimedia event hosted in Santa Fe by the Lannan Foundation. The book was influenced by his time among scientists; it has been described by S.F.I. biologist David Krakauer as "full-blown Cormac 3.0—a mathematical [and] analytical novel".

== Publication ==
Announced in March 2022, The Passenger was published by Knopf on October 25, 2022, followed six weeks later by its companion novel, Stella Maris, published on December 6. According to Publishers Weekly, the books had sold over 100,000 copies by the end of 2022.

== Themes and analysis ==
Writing for The New York Times, critic John Jeremiah Sullivan noted that the Thalidomide Kid (who is referred to simply as "the Kid" in nearly all but the very first instance in the book, with just one subsequent reference later in the story) may be a reference to the protagonist of McCarthy's 1985 novel Blood Meridian, writing that he may represent a "zombified summoning of the earlier one, only in this incarnation he has witnessed the 20th century and been thoroughly damaged by it."

== Reception ==
Many writers have praised McCarthy's prose; Guardian critic Xan Brooks called The Passenger a "glorious sunset song of a novel ... It's rich and it's strange, mercurial and melancholic." Vox contributor Constance Grady argues that McCarthy's writing is "just as great here as you would expect ... McCarthy's [sentences] are so good. They rattle out at you like little bullets, mean and punchy and precise." Atlantic writer Graeme Wood says The Passenger is among the "richest and strongest work[s] of McCarthy's career."

McCarthy has also been applauded for pushing his own artistic boundaries at such a late point in his literary career. John Jeremiah Sullivan writes in the New York Times that "The Passenger is far from McCarthy's finest work, but that's because he has had the nerve to push himself into new places, at the age of all-but-90. He has tried something in these novels that he'd never done before." Similarly, writing for Time magazine, Nicholas Mancusi notes that McCarthy's "first works of fiction to be published in 16 years begin in familiar territory but push his ambitions to the very boundaries of human understanding, where math and science are still just theory." Nick Romeo also praised the novel in The Daily Beast, calling it "a powerful and thought-provoking distillation of many of the genres and ideas that have obsessed McCarthy throughout his career ... The book's kaleidoscopic compression of sensibilities and subjects constitutes a new aesthetic in its own right."

On the contrary, many have noted the lack of a coherent and perceptible plot, one that does not answer many of the opening questions set forth in the mysterious plane crash portion of the novel; Grady calls it "deliberately frustrating" and notes that "You can almost feel McCarthy swaggering a bit as, with great skill and elegance, he chooses time and time again to frustrate any desire the reader might have for either narrative or story." Mancusi adds that "the book is more interested in expanding the scope of its own mystery than in solving it." USA Today books editor Barbara VanDenburgh notes that the book "can be at times frustratingly withholding and opaque ... giving way to plotless philosophical discursions."

The novel was longlisted for the 2023 Andrew Carnegie Medal for Excellence in Fiction.
