= Estrada index =

In chemical graph theory, the Estrada index is a topological index of protein folding. The index was first defined by Ernesto Estrada as a measure of the degree of folding of a protein, which is represented as a path-graph weighted by the dihedral or torsional angles of the protein backbone. This index of degree of folding has found multiple applications in the study of protein functions and protein-ligand interactions.

The name "Estrada index" was introduced by de la Peña et al. in 2007.

== Derivation ==
Let $G=(V,E)$ be a graph of size $|V|=n$ and let $\lambda_1 \geq \lambda_2 \geq \cdots \geq \lambda_n$ be a non-increasing ordering of the eigenvalues of its adjacency matrix $A$. The Estrada index is defined as

$$\operatorname{EE}(G)=\sum_{j=1}^n e^{\lambda_j}$$

For a general graph, the index can be obtained as the sum of the subgraph centralities of all nodes in the graph. The subgraph centrality of node $i$ is defined as

$$\operatorname{EE}(i)=\sum_{k=0}^\infty \frac{(A^k)_{ii}} {k!}$$

The subgraph centrality has the following closed form

$$\operatorname{EE}(i)=(e^A)_{ii}=\sum_{j=1}^n[\varphi _j (i)]^2 e^{\lambda _j}$$

where $\varphi _j (i)$ is the $i$ th entry of the $j$th eigenvector associated with the eigenvalue $\lambda _j$. It is straightforward to realise that

$$\operatorname{EE}(G)=\operatorname{tr}(e^A)$$
