= George Cowan =

American physical chemist and businessperson (1920–2012)

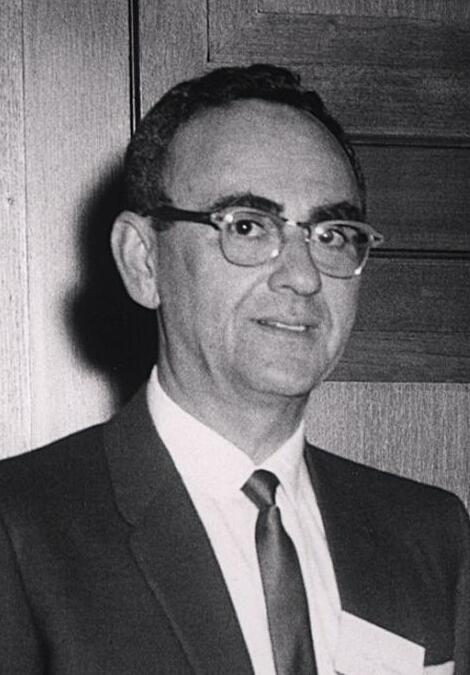
- Cowan in 1966
- Born: George Arthur Cowan; February 15, 1920; Worcester, Massachusetts, US
- Died: April 20, 2012 (aged 92); Los Alamos, New Mexico, US
- Education: Worcester Polytechnic Institute, Carnegie Institute of Technology, University of Chicago, Princeton University
- Occupations: physical chemist, businessman
- Years active: 1951–1991
- Known for: Manhattan Project
- Board member of: founder of: Santa Fe Opera, Los Alamos National Bank, Santa Fe Institute
- Awards: Enrico Fermi Award, New Mexico Academy of Science Distinguished Scientist Award, Robert H. Goddard Award, E.O. Lawrence Award, Los Alamos National Laboratory Medal

George Arthur Cowan (/kaʊən/; February 15, 1920 – April 20, 2012) was an American physical chemist, a businessman and philanthropist.

== Education ==
He conducted early research in the Manhattan Project. George served 39 years at Los Alamos National Laboratory as director of chemistry, associate director of research and senior laboratory fellow. He participated in founding the Santa Fe Opera in 1953. He founded the Los Alamos National Bank in 1963 to fund housing for Los Alamos employees and served for 30 years as its chair. He was also the driving influence in founding the Santa Fe Institute together with Nobel Prize winner Murray Gell-Mann and others in 1984, based upon his recognition of the need for a place where scientists could be offered a broader curriculum for "a kind of twenty-first century Renaissance man" and associated research. A graduate of Worcester Polytechnic Institute (bachelor of science in chemistry) and Carnegie Institute of Technology (doctorate of science), Princeton University, and the University of Chicago, he worked on the top secret Manhattan Project at Los Alamos during World War II. He received the Enrico Fermi Award for "a lifetime of exceptional achievement in the development and use of energy," the New Mexico Academy of Science Distinguished Scientist Award, the Robert H. Goddard Award, the E.O. Lawrence Award, and the Los Alamos National Laboratory Medal, which is the highest honor the Laboratory bestows upon an individual or small group.

== Biography ==
Cowan was born in Worcester, Massachusetts. In 1941, at the age of twenty one, after graduating from Worcester Polytechnic Institute in chemistry, he worked on the cyclotron project at Princeton University with the intention of taking graduate courses in physics. He worked there with future Nobel Prize Laureate Eugene Wigner, who would design the first uranium chain reactor. In 1941, George participated in taking measurements essential to determining whether the chain reaction in uranium could be achieved. His knowledge of chemistry and nuclear physics experience provided expertise necessary to the Manhattan Project. In 1942, Wigner, Cowan, and several others transferred to the Metallurgy Lab at the University of Chicago where the first atomic pile was being developed under Enrico Fermi. Starting as a junior member, Cowan became a jack-of-all-trades, capable of machining graphite blocks used to control the pile's reaction rate and in casting uranium metal. In 1942, the Chicago Pile-1 (CP-1) generated the first controlled nuclear reaction. This controlled release of energy from the nucleus of the atom provided a method to obtain nuclear fuel for the first atomic weapons. His experience made him one of the experts on the chemistry of radioactive elements in the field of applied nuclear fission. Because he was single and possessed high expertise, project managers transferred him around the nation to help resolve bottlenecks. He was one of the select group with knowledge of the separate components of the project, kept separate for security reasons. He received a draft deferment from the president of the United States for possessing skills uniquely useful to the war effort.

== Career ==
Following the end of the war and obtaining his PhD in physical chemistry from Carnegie Tech, Cowan returned to work for Los Alamos in 1950. Only weeks after his arrival, he directed the detection of radioactive fallout from samples collected near the Russian border indicating the Soviets were in possession of a nuclear bomb. He participated for some years on the Bethe Panel, whose first chairman was Hans Bethe. One of his early functions on the panel was to convince U.S. government officials that the radiochemistry of the Russian samples proved that it was not the result of a peaceful nuclear reactor problem, but a Soviet bomb, which was dubbed "Joe-1" after Joseph Stalin.

In 1953, Cowan was a member of the group which founded the Santa Fe Opera. Another member of this group was Arthur Spiegel, of the Spiegel Catalog fortune. Spiegel was later to help Cowan in his initial fund raising efforts to finance the Santa Fe Institute.

In 1982, Cowan accepted a seat on the White House Service Council. While serving in this capacity and facing problems involving interlinked aspects of science, policy, economics, environment and more, he realized that this demanded a comprehensive expertise beyond the existing reductionist approach and fragmentation of the sciences. He believed that our educational culture was enforcing intellectual fragmentation through conservative university programs that depended on specialized grants and funded work. It seemed that cross-disciplinary team efforts were discouraged by membership in traditional, isolated science and social science disciplines. He knew that beginning in the 1980s numerical experiments through computer simulations were capable of providing the tools to think about very complex problems in a more holistic fashion. He began to imagine a new and independent type of institute that would combine the charter of a university while sharing some of Los Alamos' personnel and computer power. This could be a place where senior researchers could work on particularly speculative ideas, where one could educate a person starting in pure science to deal with the real messy, inelegant world, which science wasn't engaging. In 1983, Cowan assembled a group of senior scientists interested in researching complex, adaptive systems. One year later, this assembly became the Santa Fe Institute. Initial funding came from the National Science Foundation, the Department of Energy, Citicorp and others. George was enthusiastic about complex systems, which he declared to be the next major thrust in science. The Santa Fe Institute fosters interdisciplinary research between physicists, mathematicians, economists, computer scientists, and others. Although most of his duties as president did not allow time for research, as Distinguished Fellow of the Institute, Cowan applied neuroscience principles to investigate relationships between children's brain physiological changes and behavioral development.

== Later life ==
In 1988, Cowan became a senior fellow emeritus at Los Alamos, part of a group of six longtime Los Alamos employees rewarded with research positions free from administrative chores that would also advise the laboratory director on policy issues. Cowan served as president of the Santa Fe Institute until his retirement in 1991.

== Death ==
Cowan died on April 20, 2012, from complications of pneumonia in his Los Alamos home. His remains, and those of his wife, were interred at Guaje Pines Cemetery.

== Bibliography ==
- George Cowan, Manhattan Project to the Santa Fe Institute: The Memoirs of George A.Cowan, 2010, University of New Mexico Press, ISBN 978-0-8263-4870-8

== See also ==
- Computational complexity theory
- Santa Fe Institute
- Manhattan Project

== Sources ==
- Complexity, the Emerging Science at the Edge of Order and Chaos, M. Mitchell Waldrop, 1992, Touchstone, ISBN 0671767895
- Los Alamos National Labs Staff Biographies: George A. Cowan
- George Cowan Passes Away, Santa Fe Institute (April 20, 2012)
- Obituary in Huffington Post
