= Suttree =

1979 novel by Cormac McCarthy

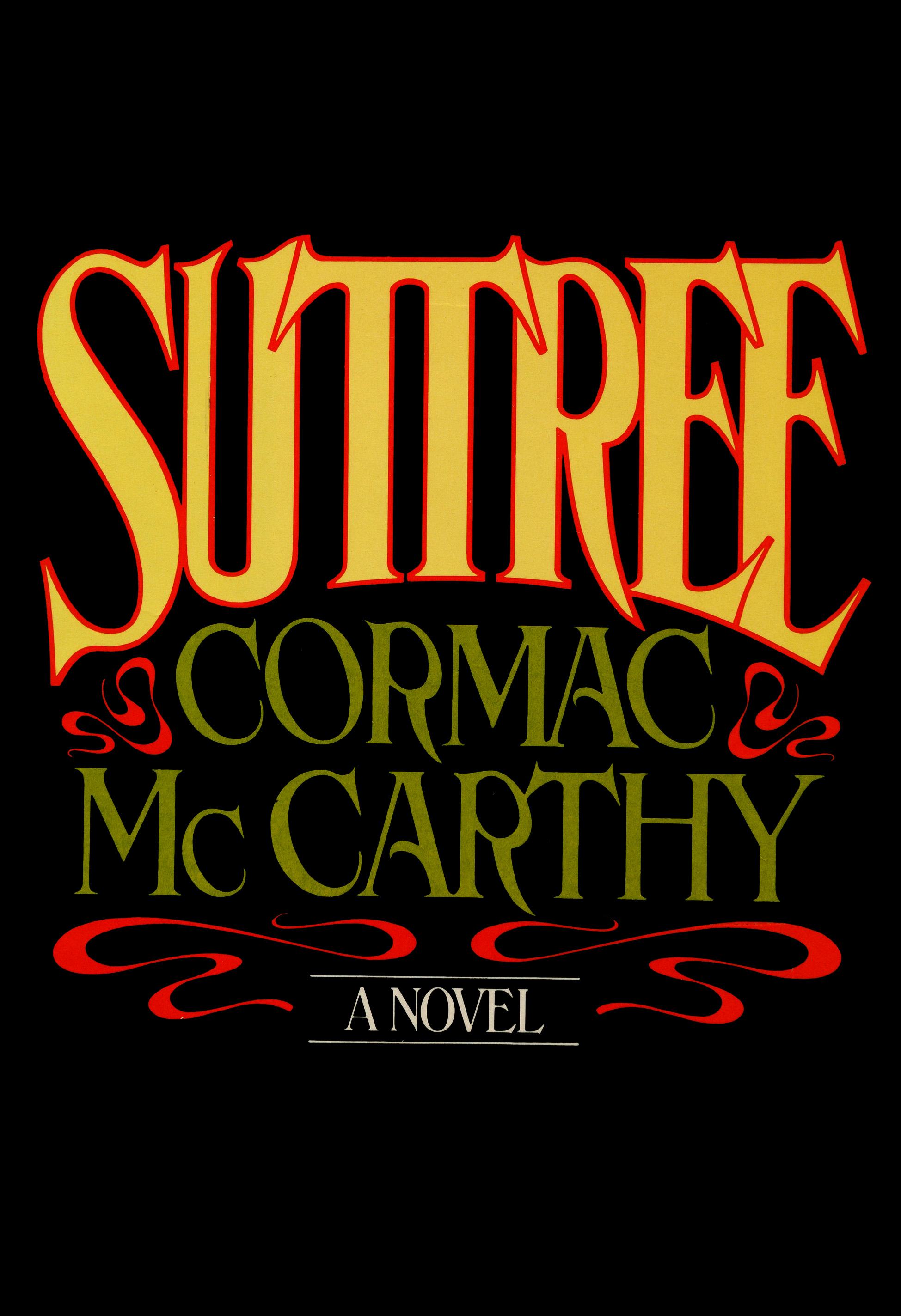
- First edition
- Author: Cormac McCarthy
- Language: English
- Genre: Autofiction
- Set in: 1950s Knoxville, Tennessee
- Publisher: Random House
- Publication date: May 1979
- Publication place: United States
- Media type: Print (hardcover)
- Pages: 471 (paperback)
- ISBN: 0-679-73632-8
- OCLC: 26322333
- Preceded by: Child of God
- Followed by: Blood Meridian

Suttree is a semi-autobiographical novel by Cormac McCarthy, published in 1979. Set in Knoxville, Tennessee, over a four-year period starting in 1950, the novel follows Cornelius Suttree, who has repudiated his former life of privilege to become a fisherman on the Tennessee River.

The novel has a fragmented structure with many flashbacks and shifts in grammatical person. Suttree has been compared to James Joyce's Ulysses and John Steinbeck's Cannery Row, and called "a doomed Huckleberry Finn" by Jerome Charyn. Suttree was written over a 20-year span and is a departure from McCarthy's previous novels, being much longer, more sprawling in structure, and perhaps his most humorous.

== Plot summary ==
The novel begins with Suttree observing police pull a suicide victim from the river. Suttree lives alone in a houseboat, on the fringes of society on the Tennessee River, earning money by fishing for the occasional catfish. He has left a life of luxury, rejecting his parents' influence, and abandoned his wife and young son.

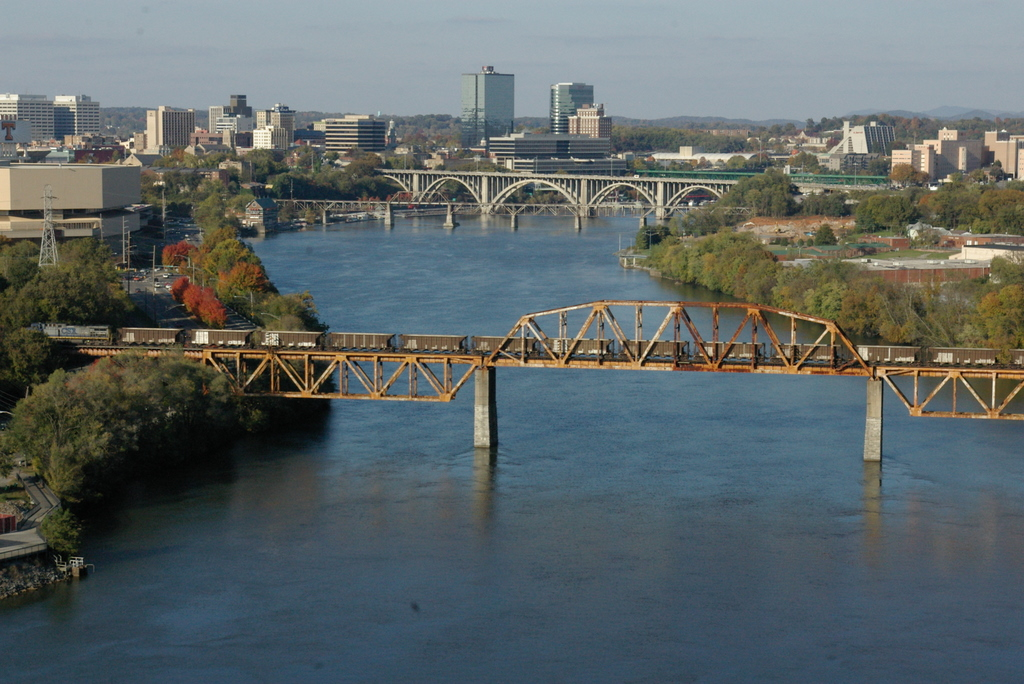
Bridges over the Tennessee River that are featured in Suttree.

A large cast of characters, largely composed of misfits and grotesques, is introduced, one of which is a dimwitted young man named Gene Harrogate, whom Suttree meets during a short stint in a work camp-style prison. Harrogate was sent to prison after being caught "violating" a farmer's watermelons. Suttree attempts to help Harrogate stay out of trouble after he is released, but this task proves vain as Harrogate sets off on a series of misadventures, including using poisoned meat and a slingshot to kill bats ("flitter-mice" as Harrogate calls them) to earn a bounty on them, and using dynamite in an attempt to tunnel underneath the city and burgle the treasury. Other prominent characters are prostitutes, hermits, alcoholics, and an aged Geechee witch.

His relationships with women all come to bad ends. One prostitute-girlfriend terminates the relationship in a moment of madness, smashing up the inside of their new car. He becomes involved with a teenage girl from a destitute family, but awakens in the night to find her crushed to death by a landslide that falls on their homeless encampment. Prior to the beginning of the book, Suttree was also married to a woman he apparently met at university. He left his wife with a young son, who dies of an illness early on in the book. He watches the funeral from afar, and proceeds to bury the boy alone once the other mourners leave.

Towards the novel's end, Suttree falls ill with typhoid fever and suffers a lengthy hallucination. This occurs after a black friend of Suttree is killed in a fight with the police and Harrogate is arrested in a failed robbery attempt. In the end, he feels his identity as an individual is affirmed by his time living in destitution, and he leaves Knoxville, seeking a new life.

== Reception ==
Novelist Nelson Algren argued that the novel was "a memorable American comedy by an original storyteller." Reviews by writers and literary critics such as Anatole Broyard, Jerome Charyn, Guy Davenport, and Shelby Foote were followed by the Times Literary Supplement review which saw the novel as "Faulknerian in its gentle wryness, and a freakish imaginative flair reminiscent of Flannery O'Connor." The profile writer and music journalist Stanley Booth observed that Suttree was "probably the funniest and most unbearably sad of McCarthy's books...which seem to me unsurpassed in American literature." Late in life, film critic Roger Ebert wrote, "I began to live through this desperate man's sad life."
