= Outer Dark =

Novel by Cormac McCarthy

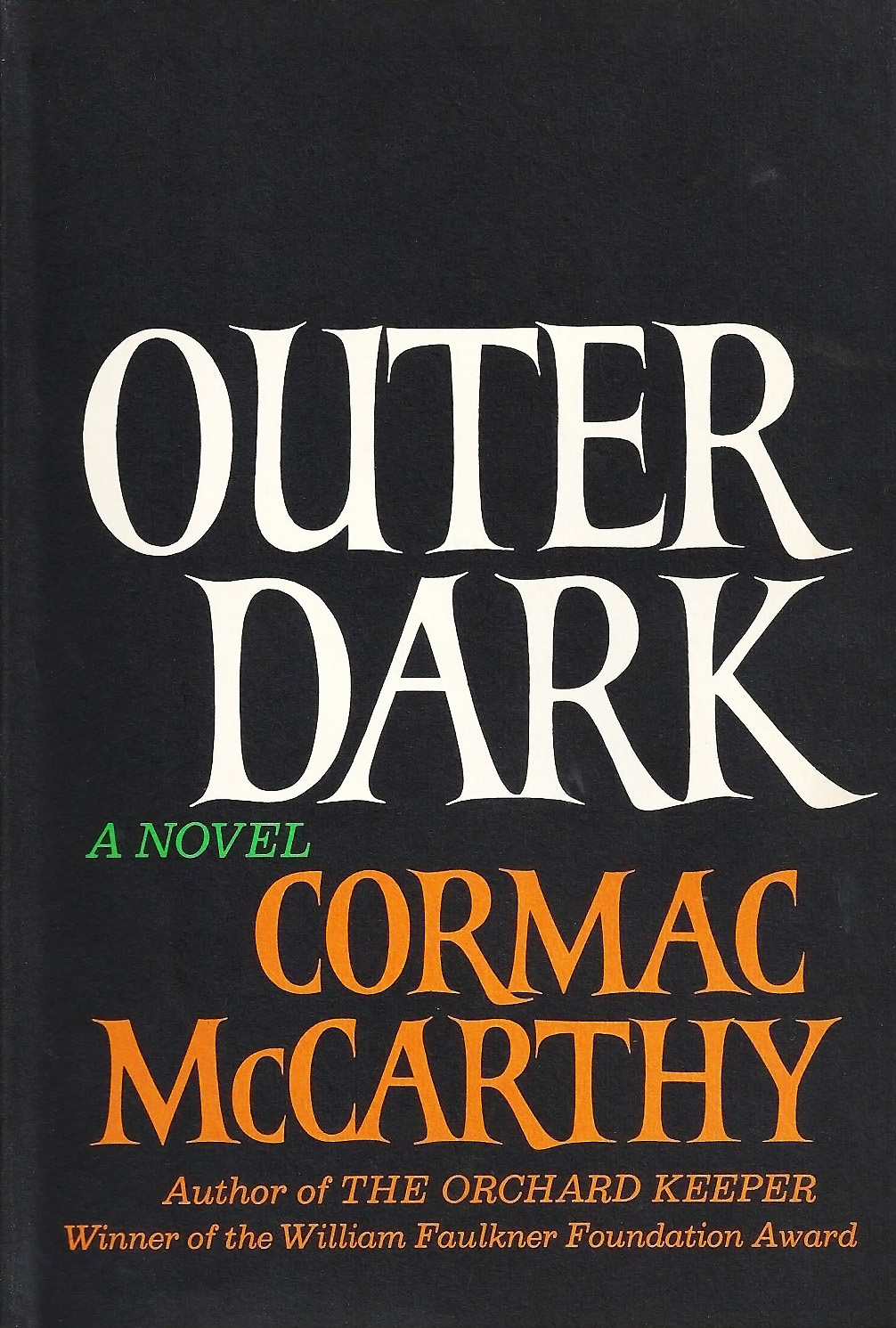
- First Edition Random House
- Author: Cormac McCarthy
- Language: English
- Genre: Novel
- Published: September 25, 1968
- Publication place: United States
- Pages: 242 (paperback)
- ISBN: 9780679728733
- Preceded by: The Orchard Keeper
- Followed by: Child of God

Outer Dark is the second novel by American writer Cormac McCarthy, published in 1968. The time and setting are nebulous, but likely take place sometime around the turn of the twentieth century somewhere in Appalachia. The novel tells of a woman named Rinthy who bears her brother's baby. The brother, Culla, leaves the nameless infant in the woods to die, but tells his sister that the newborn died of natural causes and had to be buried. Rinthy discovers this lie and sets out to find the baby for herself.

The name of the novel is derived from the Gospel of Matthew, specifically the meeting between the Roman centurion and Jesus, during which Jesus says: "But the children of the kingdom shall be cast out into outer darkness: there shall be weeping and gnashing of teeth".

== Writing process ==
McCarthy began writing the novel on December 15, 1962, in Asheville, North Carolina, and finished the first draft in New Orleans, in 1964. He wrote the early draft of the final version in Knoxville, Tennessee, and the middle and final drafts during a stay in Ibiza, Spain. Several different events occurred in McCarthy's private life during the writing of the first draft, the most important of which being the failure of his marriage to Lee Holleman McCarthy and their subsequent divorce in July 1963. During this time, McCarthy submitted The Orchard Keeper for review to Random House Books, subsequently receiving a lengthy list of suggested changes from his editor Larry Bensky, interrupting his work on the novel. His revision of The Orchard Keeper would at different times interrupt further work on Outer Dark. Aside from the work on his first novel, McCarthy suffered loneliness during this period, with his wife and son having left him, and with McCarthy having moved to Knoxville, Tennessee. He wrote the final version of the novel 18 months after his marriage to Anne DeLisle.

== Characters ==
- Culla Holme – the main male character, brother and former lover of Rinthy Holme
- Rinthy Holme – the main female character, sister and former lover of Culla Holme
- The Tinker – the man who finds the abandoned child and takes him home to care for him
- The Unnamed Child – abandoned child of Rinthy and Culla Holme
- The Trio – a mysterious group of nameless men who are following Culla, they are ruthless killers who seem to be punishing Culla for his sins, but also routinely murder others along their journey

== Plot ==
=== Introduction ===
The novel introduces the siblings Culla and Rinthy Holme. As a result of their sexual relationship, Rinthy is pregnant and only a few days from labor. Shortly, they encounter the tinker, a traveling salesman peddling odds-and-ends and pornography out of a shoddy cart. Due to Culla's unwillingness to get help during the birth, it becomes clear that he is ashamed of what he has created. After the child is born and Rinthy falls asleep, Culla takes the baby out to die in the woods, telling Rinthy when she awakes that the child has died.

The baby is found by the tinker, who takes him to a wet nurse without knowing who his parents are. Rinthy finds an empty grave and sets out to find the child.

=== Culla's journey ===
After abandoning the child, Culla tries to escape his sin and sets out across the country to find work.

His first job is with a local squire, who puts him to work chopping wood, for which he is paid half a dollar. After he leaves, it is discovered that a pair of expensive boots have been stolen. Immediately blaming Culla, the squire pursues him. The squire is set upon by an unknown trio of men and killed.

Culla travels to the town of Cheatham looking for work, where someone has desecrated three graves near the church. Culla is blamed and runs away from the town.

His next job is painting the roof of a barn some distance from Cheatham, but he is found by law enforcement. Culla injures himself while fleeing.

Culla finds an old man who gives him a drink of water and shows off his gun and hunting trophies. He invites Culla to stay and learn snake hunting from him. He refuses. The trio again shows up and kills the man.

In Preston Falls, Culla finds employment digging graves. Returning to town for payment, he finds it abandoned and quickly runs away from it. Culla tries to cross a river on a ferry with the ferryman and a man on horseback. During their night crossing, the river surges too quickly and the ferryman, the man and the horse are killed. Near dawn, Culla is helped ashore by the trio that have followed him. They suspect him of murdering the two men aboard the ferry. While in their company, Culla is obliged to eat strange meat from their fire. Ultimately, the men take his boots.

Culla stumbles upon an abandoned home and takes refuge in it. In the morning, he is apprehended by an armed man who takes him to the squire, who again accuses him of a crime, this time of trespassing. He pleads guilty to this crime for a lighter sentence, and works off his fine.

The final episode of his journey is his being accused of inciting a herd of pigs off a cliff, along with the murder of a young hog-driver. To evade being executed, Culla jumps off a cliff into a river, injuring his leg. Coming ashore, he again finds the trio, as well as his child (burned on one side of his body and missing an eye) and the body of the Tinker. After accusing Culla of fathering and abandoning the child, the leader of the trio slays the baby, after which a companion appears to begin to eat it.

=== Rinthy's journey ===
Careful to avoid her brother, Rinthy sets out to look for their child. After travelling a while, during the night she stumbles upon a house. Here the family take her in, feeding her and offering her a place to sleep. The oldest boy of the family expresses interest in her, which she rejects. Travelling with them to the town, she is unable to find sign of the child and sets out again alone.

Travelling further she stays briefly with two families, realizes that she is still lactating and retains hope for the child's well-being. She stays for some time with an old woman living in a forest with a dislike for snakes and dogs.

Next she meets a lawyer who treats her kindly and allows her to rest at his office while she waits for a doctor, who keeps business across from the lawyer. The doctor gives her hope that her child is still alive and a salve for her breasts which are sore from the lactation and have begun bleeding.

Rinthy finally catches up to the Tinker, who takes her to his cabin in order to reunite her with her child. He instead berates her for abandoning the baby, telling her he deserves the child far more than she. Beginning to guess at the truth, the Tinker demands to know if Culla is the child's father. When Rinthy tells him he is, the Tinker refuses to believe it, calling Rinthy a liar and storming from the cabin saying he will kill her if she follows him.

Later, she appears to be living with an unidentified man on a small farm. The man insists she speak to him but she says she does not have anything to say. In the middle of the night, she steals away from the farm and the “dead and loveless house,” returning to the road.

Finally, she comes upon the clearing where her child’s body has been burned, along with the Tinker’s cart, and where the Tinker’s body hangs in a tree. She lingers in the clearing, and goes to sleep as night falls.

=== Ending ===
Years later, Culla talks to a blind man who tells him of the blessings of being blind, and that he prays for what he needs. Culla later watches the blind man walking towards a swamp, which for him means certain death. The novel ends with Culla thinking, "Someone should tell a blind man before setting him out that way."

== Major themes ==
=== Consequences of sin ===
In his second novel, McCarthy moved away from the naturalistic conventions of The Orchard Keeper. A number of writing conventions which were present in his first novel are here lacking: a distinct chronology, allusions to the modern world beyond the mountain culture, or forays into frontier and absurdist comedy. Instead, McCarthy introduces a Calvinistic conception of sin and retribution, which creates a cruel and bleak world in contrast to a world in the original state of innocence. The state of innocence is here present in the familial isolation, surrounded by nature, which was desecrated by incest. The ugliness of the sin is underscored by the ugliness of the child found at the end of the novel, while the sexual nature of the siblings' sin is underscored by the Tinker who found the child, as he is a lecherous and deformed seller of supplies and pornography. Culla further commits a double sin of attempted infanticide. The forces of retribution are present in the trio of murderous men, McCarthy's grotesque equivalent of the Erinyes (or Furies, or Eumenides) of Greek myth. However, cosmic retribution in Outer Dark does not simply punish those who have committed a sin; it punishes those who are innocent and guilty alike.

=== Nihilism ===
Ethical considerations do not seem to exist in the world of Outer Dark, while the fates of characters are not determined by the morality of their lives. The world of Outer Dark appears to be devoid of meaning, which can be seen in both the opening and closing scenes of the novel. In the beginning of the novel, the salvation and happiness promised by the prophet in Culla's dream never arrives. Instead, the world remains in cold darkness, unchanged. The last scene of the novel, in which a blind man walks off into the mire of a bog, is a paradigm for a dead-end, paradigmless world.

== Reception ==
Thomas Lask gave the novel a positive review, complimenting McCarthy's ability to combine the mythic and the actual in a perfect work of imagination.

Walter Sullivan, one of McCarthy's most demanding critics, noted the power, literary virtuosity, and universality of his characters. He further highlights McCarthy's ability to find devices and characters that grasp us in their strangeness and force us to grapple with the reality surrounding us.

== Adaptations ==
In 2009, a fifteen-minute film based on the book, directed by Stephen Imwalle and with Jamie Dunne and Azel James playing as Rinthy Holme and Culla Holme respectively, was released on the U.S. festival circuit.

László Nemes is set to direct a feature film adaptation starring Jacob Elordi and Lily-Rose Depp. Principal photography is planned for 2026.
