= Richard Slansky =

American theoretical physicist (1940–1998)

Richard C. Slansky (3 April 1940 – 16 January 1998) was an American theoretical physicist.

Slansky received his bachelor's degree from Harvard University and his PhD under Elliot Leader from the University of California, Berkeley. As a post-doc he was at Caltech and then for five years at Yale University, before he joined in 1974 the newly founded theory group for particle physics at Los Alamos National Laboratory under Peter A. Carruthers. In 1989 he became head of the theory group. He was also an adjunct professor at the University of California, Irvine. He died of a brain aneurysm.

Slansky worked on Grand Unified Theories (GUTs). His monograph "Group theory for unified model building" was well known and widely used by GUT theorists. He gained international recognition for his work on the applications of group theory to GUTs, published 85 scientific papers, and served as editor of the journal Physics Reports. In 1983 he was one of the founders of the Santa Fe Institute.

He was a fellow of both the American Physical Society (1987) and the American Association for the Advancement of Science.
