= Cities of the Plain (novel) =

1998 novel by Cormac McCarthy

- First edition
- Author: Cormac McCarthy
- Language: English
- Series: Border Trilogy
- Genre: Western
- Publisher: Alfred A. Knopf
- Publication date: May 12, 1998
- Publication place: United States
- Media type: Print (hardcover)
- Pages: 292 pp
- ISBN: 0-679-42390-7
- OCLC: 38550262
- Dewey Decimal: 813/.54 21
- LC Class: PS3563.C337 C58 1998
- Preceded by: The Crossing

Cities of the Plain is the final volume of American novelist Cormac McCarthy's "Border Trilogy", published in 1998. The title is a reference to Sodom and Gomorrah (Genesis 19:29).

== Plot summary ==
The story opens in 1952. John Grady Cole (the protagonist of All the Pretty Horses) and Billy Parham (the protagonist of The Crossing) work together on a cattle ranch south of Alamogordo, New Mexico, not far from the border cities of El Paso, Texas, and Ciudad Juárez in the state of Chihuahua, Mexico. The ranch's owners are kind, but face an uncertain future in a dying industry. Recently devastated by drought, cattle ranches around El Paso are struggling and may be claimed by the Department of Defense, through eminent domain, to become military areas. Though the cowboys barely make a living, John Grady and Billy love life on the open range, and John Grady – as detailed in All the Pretty Horses – is a master at training horses. Billy is an excellent tracker.

During a visit to a brothel in Juárez, John Grady falls in love with a young, epileptic prostitute, Magdalena. The couple plans to marry and live in the U.S., and John Grady renovates an abandoned cabin, turning it into a home. But Magdalena's brothel is run by Eduardo, a formidable adversary also in love with the young girl. Billy attempts to dissuade John Grady but feels obligated to help the couple.

On the day of the planned escape, Magdalena steals away from the brothel to meet John Grady at a crossing of the Rio Grande, but Eduardo becomes aware of the plan before Magdalena can succeed. Eduardo's subordinate Tiburcio murders Magdalena by cutting her throat. After John Grady finds her body in the morgue, he faces Eduardo in a knife fight. Though John Grady kills Eduardo, he is mortally wounded in the fight. He survives long enough to contact Billy, who hurries to comfort John Grady before his death.

After John Grady's death, a short epilogue—not unlike the conclusion of Blood Meridian (1985)—details, in a few pages, the next several decades of Billy's life. After drifting across the Southwest for many years, working ranches and living in hotels, Billy, homeless, takes shelter beneath a highway underpass. There, he meets a mysterious man who tells him about a convoluted dream. Though the man denies it, Billy suspects he is Death. However, Billy survives the meeting with the man and finds shelter and a new life with a family who takes him in.

== Reception ==
Cities of the Plain was favorably reviewed in The New York Times, though the reviewer criticized McCarthy's violent prose and arcane language, observing: "One begins to miss the simple evocation of cowboy life that is so stirring in the earlier novels."

== Film adaptation ==
In 2007, Australian filmmaker Andrew Dominik revealed he had written a screenplay adaptation of Cities of the Plain; however, in 2008, Dominik said plans for it fell through. At the 2012 Cannes Film Festival, Dominik expressed continuing interest in the project, but said he would first work on his Marilyn Monroe film Blonde. In a 2014 article published in Vice, actor James Franco discussed being visited by Dominik during the production of 127 Hours, and later again outside Columbia University, as Dominik tried to convince him to star in the adaptation, though Franco ultimately felt that "the prospect didn't have the right glow about it".
