= All the Pretty Horses (novel) =

1992 novel by Cormac McCarthy

- Author: Cormac McCarthy
- Language: English
- Series: Border Trilogy
- Publisher: Alfred A. Knopf
- Publication date: May 11, 1992
- Publication place: United States
- Media type: Print (hardback & paperback)
- Pages: 301 pp (first edition, hardback)
- ISBN: 0-394-57474-5 (first edition, hardback)
- OCLC: 25704649
- Dewey Decimal: 813/.54 20
- LC Class: PS3563.C337 A79 1992
- Preceded by: Blood Meridian
- Followed by: The Crossing

All the Pretty Horses is a novel by American author Cormac McCarthy published by Alfred A. Knopf in 1992. His sixth published novel, it was his first bestseller, selling 190,000 hardcover in its first six months of publication where none of his first five novels had sold more than 5,000. It won both the U.S. National Book Award and the National Book Critics Circle Award.

It tells the story of John Grady Cole, who gets a job breaking horses at a ranch in Mexico and falls in love with the owner's daughter, Alejandra. It's the first novel in McCarthy's Border Trilogy. It was followed by The Crossing, about a different protagonist travelling across the U.S.–Mexico borderlands; and Cities of the Plain, the story of both protagonists in their adulthood.

It was later adapted into a 2000 film directed by Billy Bob Thornton, starring Matt Damon as John Grady and Penélope Cruz as Alejandra.

== Plot summary ==
The novel tells the story of John Grady Cole, a 16-year-old who grew up on his grandfather's ranch in San Angelo, Texas. The boy was raised for a significant part of his youth, perhaps 15 of his 16 years, by a family of Mexican origin who worked on the ranch; he is a native speaker of Spanish and English. The story begins in 1949, soon after the death of John Grady's grandfather when Grady learns the ranch is to be sold. Faced with the prospect of moving into town, Grady instead chooses to leave and persuades his best friend, Lacey Rawlins, to accompany him. Traveling by horseback, the pair head southward into Mexico, where they hope to find work as cowboys.

Shortly before they cross the Mexican border, they encounter a boy of about 13 who says he is named Jimmy Blevins. Blevins rides a huge bay horse that is far too fine a specimen to be the legal property of a runaway boy, but he insists it belongs to him. As they travel south through a severe thunderstorm, Blevins' horse runs off, and he loses his pistol.

Blevins persuades Grady and Rawlins to accompany him to the nearest town to find the horse and his pistol. They find both, but have no way to prove Blevins' ownership. Against his companions' better judgment, Blevins steals back the horse. As the three are riding away, they are pursued, and Blevins separates from Rawlins and Grady. The pursuers follow Blevins, and Rawlins and Grady escape.

Rawlins and Grady travel further south. In the fertile oasis region of Coahuila known as the Bolsón de Cuatro Ciénegas, they find employment at a large ranch. There, Grady encounters the ranch owner's beautiful daughter, Alejandra. As Rawlins pursues work with the ranch hands, Grady's skill with horses catches the eye of the owner, who brings him into the ranch house and promotes him to a more responsible position as a horse trainer and breeder. Grady begins an affair with Alejandra, which attracts the attention of Alejandra's great aunt. She tells Grady about the consequences in Mexican society of a woman losing her honor, and how Alejandra cannot afford to be seen in the presence of Grady due to its potential effect on her reputation. The aunt recounts her own story of love and loss, and says, though it might seem she would be sympathetic to her grandniece's desire, it has the opposite effect.

As Grady and Alejandra secretly become more deeply involved, a group of Mexican rangers visit the ranch and then ride off without explanation. Alejandra returns to Mexico City, where she is in school, and Grady plans to ask her to admit her true feelings for him upon her return. When he confides this to a senior ranch hand who has been kind to him, Grady is surprised to learn Alejandra has returned without visiting him.

Sometime later, the Mexican rangers return and arrest Rawlins and Grady. They are brought to a holding cell where they discover Blevins is also in custody. They learn Blevins had escaped his pursuers, but subsequently returned to the village where he had recovered his horse, this time to retrieve the pistol. In the process, he shot and killed a man.

The three boys are interrogated and beaten, and a crooked police captain threatens them. While they are being transferred from their small jail to a larger prison, the captain and police officers detour to a remote ranch. Blevins is led off while Rawlins and Grady watch powerlessly. They then hear gunshots as Blevins is executed.

The two friends are brought to the larger prison, where the inmates test them by attacking them relentlessly over a number of days. They barely survive and try to figure out how to escape the prison. An inmate with special privileges, who seems to command the respect of the other inmates, takes an interest in their situation and suggests money might solve their problem. They decline this offer of protection because they have no money, and Rawlins is soon severely wounded by a knife-wielding inmate and is taken away; Grady is not sure if Rawlins has survived. Soon afterward, Grady is wounded while defending himself from a cuchillero (knife attacker) and kills the man.

After a long recovery from his near-fatal stabbing, Grady is released and finds Rawlins has also survived and been freed. They discover Alejandra's aunt has interceded to free them, but on the condition that Alejandra never sees Grady again.

Rawlins returns to the United States and Grady tries to see Alejandra again. After a brief encounter, Alejandra decides she must keep her promise to her family and refuses Grady's marriage proposal. Grady, on his way back to Texas, kidnaps the captain at gunpoint, forces him to recover the horses and guns that were taken from him, Rawlins, and Blevins, and flees across the country. He is severely wounded in the escape and cauterizes a serious gunshot wound using his pistol barrel heated in a fire.

He considers killing the captain, but encounters a group of Mexicans that call themselves "men of the country", who take the captain as a prisoner. Grady eventually returns to Texas and spends months trying to find the owner of Blevins' horse. He gains legal possession of the horse in a court hearing where he recounts the entire story of his journey across the border, and the judge later tries to absolve Grady of his guilt both for killing the prisoner who attacked him and for not being able to prevent Blevins’ murder.

Grady briefly reunites with Rawlins to return his horse and learns that his own father has died. After watching the burial procession of one of his family's lifelong employees, Grady rides off into the West with Blevins' horse in tow.

== See also ==
- All the Pretty Horses (lullaby)
