= The Border Trilogy =

Novel trilogy by Cormac McCarthy

- All the Pretty Horses; The Crossing; Cities of the Plain
- Author: Cormac McCarthy
- Country: United States
- Language: English; Spanish
- Genre: Western; tragedy; romance; adventure; bildungsroman
- Publisher: Vintage Books
- Media type: Print (hardback & paperback)
- Preceded by: Blood Meridian
- Followed by: No Country for Old Men

The Border Trilogy is a series of novels by the American author Cormac McCarthy: All the Pretty Horses (1992), The Crossing (1994), and Cities of the Plain (1998).

The trilogy revolves around the coming of age and adventures of two young cowboys, John Grady Cole and Billy Parham, and is mainly set on the border between the Southwestern United States and Mexico.
