= The Crossing (McCarthy novel) =

1994 novel by Cormac McCarthy

- First edition
- Author: Cormac McCarthy
- Language: English
- Series: Border Trilogy
- Publisher: Alfred A. Knopf
- Publication date: June 1994
- Publication place: United States
- Media type: Print (hardback & paperback)
- Pages: 426 pp (first edition, hardback)
- ISBN: 0-394-57475-3
- OCLC: 29844718
- Dewey Decimal: 813/.54 20
- LC Class: PS3563.C337 C7 1994
- Preceded by: All the Pretty Horses
- Followed by: Cities of the Plain

The Crossing is a novel by American author Cormac McCarthy, published in 1994 by Alfred A. Knopf. The book is the second installment of McCarthy's "Border Trilogy," following the award-winning All the Pretty Horses (1992), and preceding Cities of the Plain, where the protagonists of both novels work together on a ranch in southern New Mexico.

== Plot introduction ==
The book begins focusing on the life of the protagonist, Billy Parham, and his brother Boyd, with their family living in southern New Mexico in the early 20th Century. The Crossing is a coming-of-age novel, and throughout the book, physical, cultural, and social boundaries play a large role in the telling of the story. The story tells of three journeys taken from New Mexico to Mexico, and throughout the story and Billy's crossings, the writing contributes to the idea that crossing borders is a catalyst for bad tidings. It is noted for being more melancholic than the first book of the trilogy, without returning to the hellish bleakness of McCarthy's early novels.

Although the novel is not overtly satirical or humorous, it has many of the qualities of a picaresque: a realistic portrayal of a destitute hero embarking on a series of loosely connected, arguably doomed quests.

== Plot summary ==
The first sojourn details a series of hunting expeditions conducted by Billy, his father, and to a lesser extent, his brother Boyd. They are attempting to locate and trap a pregnant female wolf which has been preying on cattle near the family's homestead. McCarthy explores themes throughout the action such as the mystical passage describing his father setting a trap:

Crouched in the broken shadow with the sun at his back and holding the trap at eyelevel against the morning sky he looked to be truing some older, some subtler instrument. Astrolabe or sextant. Like a man bent at fixing himself someway in the world. Bent on trying by arc or chord the space between his being and the world that was. If there be such space. If it be knowable.

When Billy finally catches the animal, he harnesses her and, instead of killing her, determines to return her to the mountains of Mexico where he believes her original home is located. He develops a deep affection for and bond with the wolf, risking his life to save her on more than one occasion.

Along the way, Billy encounters many other travelers and inhabitants of the land who relate in a sophisticated dialogue their deepest philosophies. Take, for example, a Mormon who converts to Catholicism and describes his vision of reality in this way:

Things separate from their stories have no meaning. They are only shapes. Of a certain size and color. A certain weight. When their meaning has become lost to us they no longer have even a name. The story on the other hand can never be lost from its place in the world for it is that place. And that is what was to be found here. The corrido. The tale. And like all corridos it ultimately told one story only, for there is only one to tell.

In the second border crossing, Billy and Boyd have set out to recover horses stolen from their family's spread. Their relationship is a strained one, with Boyd displaying a more stubborn nature than that of his brother, a characteristic that hinders Billy's attempts to protect him. Boyd is eventually shot through the chest in a squabble. After he is nursed back to health, he disappears with a young girl.

The third crossing features Billy alone attempting to discover his brother's whereabouts. He learns Boyd has been killed in a gunfight and sets out to find his dead brother's remains and return them to New Mexico. After finding Boyd's grave and exhuming the body, Billy is ambushed by a band of men who desecrate Boyd's remains and stab Billy's horse through the chest. Billy, with the help of a gypsy, nurses the horse back to riding condition.

The last scene shows Billy alone and desolate, coming across a terribly beat up dog that approaches him for help. In marked contrast to his youthful bond with the wolf, he shoos the dog away angrily, meanly. Later, he feels a flood of remorse: he goes after the dog, calling for it to come back—but it has gone. He breaks down in tears.

== Reception ==
Critics disagree about the greater significance of Billy's encounters with the wolf. Wallis Sanborn argues that “[a]lthough noble, Parham’s mission to return the captured she-wolf to Mexico is abjectly flawed . . . [it is] nothing more than a man violently controlling a wild animal through the guise of pseudo-nobility” (143). Raymond Malewitz argues that the wolf's "literary agency" becomes visible when Billy's way of thinking about the wolf conflicts with the way the narrator describes the creature.
