= Stella Maris (novel) =

2022 novel by Cormac McCarthy

- Author: Cormac McCarthy
- Audio read by: Julia Whelan; Edoardo Ballerini
- Language: English
- Publisher: Alfred A. Knopf
- Publication date: December 6, 2022
- Publication place: United States
- Media type: Print
- Pages: 208
- ISBN: 978-0-307-26900-3
- Preceded by: The Passenger

Stella Maris is a 2022 novel by American writer Cormac McCarthy that was published on December 6, 2022. It is a companion novel to The Passenger. It was the final novel published before his death on June 13, 2023. It consists primarily of dialogue with little narration, exploring the nature of the protagonist's delusions and topics such as quantum mechanics and phenomenology.

== Plot ==
The novel follows Alicia Western, a math prodigy conflicted by her father's contributions to the American development of the atomic bomb. The entire novel is set in 1972 in Black River Falls, Wisconsin, at the titular Stella Maris, "a non-denominational facility and hospice for the care of psychiatric medical patients," as stated on page 3 (the only page that is not written in dialogue). The novel consists of a "series of conversations between Alicia and her psychiatrist, Dr. Cohen, written like a play but with no exposition, stage directions, or dialogue tags. The subjects include mathematics, quantum mechanics, music theory, and obscure philosophy."

== Development ==
In a 2009 interview, McCarthy said that he had been "planning on writing about a woman for 50 years".

== Publication ==
Announced in March 2022, Stella Maris was published by Knopf on December 6, 2022, one month after its companion novel The Passenger.

== Translations ==
As of mid-2025, the book has been translated into:

- Czech
- Polish
- Japanese
- German
- Swedish
- Korean
- Spanish
- Norwegian
- Dutch
- Italian
- French
- Portuguese
- Greek,
- Romanian
- Ukrainian
