= Erik Wielenberg =

American philosopher

Erik J. Wielenberg (born March 11, 1972) is an American author and former professor of philosophy at DePauw University in Greencastle, Indiana. An atheist, Wielenberg defends nontheistic moral realism.

== Selected publications ==
- Value and Virtue in a Godless Universe, Cambridge University Press, 2005, ISBN 978-0-521-60784-1.
- God and the Reach of Reason: C.S. Lewis, David Hume, and Bertrand Russell, Cambridge University Press, 2008, ISBN 978-0-521-70710-7.
- Edited by New Waves in Philosophy of Religion with Yujin Nagasawa. Palgrave Macmillan, 2008, ISBN 978-0-230-22385-1.
- Robust Ethics: The Metaphysics and Epistemology of Godless Normative Realism, Oxford University Press, 2014, ISBN 978-0-198-81200-5.
- With A Debate on God and Morality: What is the Best Account of Objective Moral Values and Duties? with William Lane Craig, edited by Adam Lloyd Johnson. Routledge, 2020, ISBN 978-0-367-13565-2.
