= IFISC =

European research institute

The Instituto de Fisica Interdisciplinar y Sistemas Complejos (IFISC), or in English the Institute for Cross-Disciplinary Physics and Complex Systems, is a research institute in Europe involved in the study of complex systems and complex phenomena, staffed by permanent professors and researchers, non-tenured Postdoctoral researchers and Ph.D. and Master students. It is a joint research unit between the Spanish National Research Council (CSIC) and the University of the Balearic Islands (UIB), situated in Palma de Mallorca, Spain.

== Background ==
IFISC was created in 2007, as an initiative of the members of the former Cross-Disciplinary Physics Department of the Mediterranean Institute for Advance Studies (IMEDEA). The institute particularly performs research at the border of physics with other disciplines that range from social sciences to natural sciences and information technology. IFISC members develop interdisciplinary research from the physicists’ point of view. To this end, the research methodology comprises the transfer of knowledge, concepts and methods from physics to other well established disciplines. IFISC claims to focus on advanced studies with potential applications, avoiding the polarization between basic and applied science.

The research followed by the institute manifests itself in the basis of a transverse line of exploratory nature covering the generic phenomena of nonlinear physics and complex systems, with tools borrowed from Statistical Physics, Dynamical Systems, Information Theory, Computational Methods and Quantum Mechanics. The main research line is complemented by a group of sublines of transfer of knowledge from that line, that include quantum physics and nanoscience, nonlinear photonics and information technologies, geophysical fluids, biocomplex systems and social and socio-technical systems.

Since 2012, IFISC has been running a Master program in Complex systems. The program focuses on the fundamental aspects that are necessary to understand the paradigm of complex systems, including training in theoretical, computational and experimental work.
