= Journal of Complex Networks =

- Discipline: Science
- Language: English
- Edited by: Ernesto Estrada

Publication details
- Publisher: Oxford University Press (United Kingdom)
- Frequency: 6 issues per year
- Impact factor: 2.011 (2020)

Standard abbreviations
- ISO 4: J. Complex Netw.

Indexing
- ISSN: 2051-1310 (print); 2051-1329 (web)

Links
- Journal homepage

The Journal of Complex Networks is a peer reviewed academic journal of complex networks. It is published by Oxford University Press. The journal was established in 2013, with Ernesto Estrada as its editor-in-chief.
