= Nautilus Quarterly =

Online and print science magazine

Nautilus Magazine
- Editorial Director: John Steele
- Founding Editor in Chief: Michael Segal
- Categories: Science
- Frequency: Bi-monthly
- Publisher: John Steele
- Founder: John Steele
- First issue: April 2013; 13 years ago
- Company: NautilusNext Inc.
- Country: United States
- Based in: Austin
- Language: English
- Website: nautil.us
- ISSN: 2372-1766

Nautilus is an American popular science magazine featuring journalism, essays, graphic narratives, fiction, and criticism. It covers most areas of science, and related topics in philosophy, technology, and history. Nautilus is published six times annually, with some of the print issues focusing on a selected theme, which also appear on its website. Issue themes have included human uniqueness, time, uncertainty, genius, mergers & acquisitions, creativity, consciousness, and reality, among many others.

== Reception ==
In Nautilus' launch year (2013), it was cited as one of Library Journal's Ten Best New Magazines Launched; was named one of the World's Best-Designed news sites by the Society for News Design; received an honorary mention as one of RealClearScience's top science news sites; and received three awards from FOLIO: magazine, including Best Consumer Website and Best Full Issue.

In 2014, the magazine won a Webby Award for best science website and was nominated for two others; had two stories selected to be included in 2014 edition of The Best American Science and Nature Writing; won a FOLIO award for Best Standalone Digital Consumer Magazine; and was nominated for two Webby Awards.

In 2015, Nautilus won two National Magazine Awards (a.k.a. "Ellies"), for General Excellence (Literature, Science and Politics Magazines) and Best Website. It is the only magazine in the history of the award to have won multiple Ellies in its first year of eligibility. It also had one story included in the 2015 edition of The Best American Science and Nature Writing, and another story won a AAAS Kavli Science Journalism Award. RealClearScience again named it a top-10 science website.

In 2016, Nautilus had one story included in the 2016 edition of The Best American Science and Nature Writing; won an American Society of Magazine Editor's Award for Best Style and Design of a cover; and was nominated for a Webby Award.

In 2017, Nautilus had three stories selected for inclusion in the 2017 edition of The Best American Science and Nature Writing; one piece won a AAAS Kavli Science Journalism Award; another piece won a Solar Physics Division Popular Media Award from the American Astronomical Society; and was a Webby Award Nominee for Best Editorial Writing.

More than a dozen Nautilus illustrations have been recognized by American Illustration, Spectrum, and the Society of Illustrators.

Cormac McCarthy made his non-fiction writing debut in Nautilus on 20 April 2017 with an article entitled, "The Kekulé Problem."

== Name ==
The word "nautilus" has a number of meanings that are referred to in the title of the magazine. "'The nautilus is so steeped in math and myth and story, from Verne to the Golden Mean to the spectacular sea creature itself,' [Nautilus publisher John] Steele said, 'that it seemed a fitting namesake for the idea of connecting and illuminating science.'"

== Controversy ==
On 13 December 2017, twenty of Nautilus' freelance writers published "An Open Letter from Freelancers at Nautilus Magazine" in the National Writers Union, alleging that the company was in arrears to them for $50,000 for unpaid work. They announced that ten of them had joined the NWU in order "to pursue a group non-payment grievance with legal action if necessary". On 15 December 2017, the Nautilus publisher, John Steele, published a reply explaining the magazine's financial situation and taking responsibility for the late payments. On 1 February 2018, the National Writers Union announced it had reached a settlement with Steele.

On 7 November 2019, the National Writers Union announced in a letter that NautilusThink, and its parent NautilusNext, still owe $186,000 to former contributors. On 20 November 2019, chief executive of NautilusNext Nicholas White told Columbia Journalism Review that the magazine was committed to not take any profit until the writers it owed were paid back in full. "That commitment was made long before the National Writers Union issued a press release about the acquisition on November 7th," White said. "We did it because it was the right thing to do, and the right way to set a new course for the magazine’s future.”

== Partnerships ==
On 20 March 2018, Nautilus announced a marketing partnership with Kalmbach Media, publisher of Discover and Astronomy magazines. At the time of the partnership, the three magazines had a combined reach of 10 million users.

== See also ==
- Aeon (magazine)
- Quanta Magazine
