= Peter A. Carruthers =

American physicist (1935–1997)

Peter Ambler Carruthers
- Born: 1935; Lafayette, Indiana, U.S.
- Died: August 3, 1997 (aged 61–62); Tucson, Arizona, U.S.
- Education: Carnegie Institute of Technology; Cornell University
- Scientific career
- Fields: Physics
- Workplaces: Cornell University; Los Alamos; University of Arizona
- Doctoral advisor: Hans Bethe
- Doctoral students: Leonard Susskind

Peter Carruthers (1935 – August 3, 1997) was an American physicist best known for leading the theoretical division of Los Alamos National Laboratory from 1973 until 1980.

== Early life and education ==
Peter Carruthers was born in Lafayette, Indiana, United States. He attended the Carnegie Institute of Technology graduating in 1957. He then studied at Cornell University where in 1961 he gained a PhD in theoretical physics. His doctoral advisor was Hans Bethe.

== Career ==
After earning his PhD, he remained at Cornell University, where he quickly became a full professor. While there he supervised PhD students and post-doctoral fellows until retiring from the position in 1973, when he became the leader of the theoretical division at Los Alamos Laboratory. While there he oversaw the growth of the laboratory and developed an internationally renowned programme which focused on wide-ranging fundamental research. In 1980 he stepped down from this position but remained at Los Alamos until 1986, becoming a senior fellow and leader of the Elementary Particle and Field Theory Group. He then joined the University of Arizona as the head of the physics department. He later became the director of the Center for the Study of Complex Systems. Together with Murray Gell-Mann and others he played a role in the creation of the Santa Fe Institute.

== Books ==
- Hadronic Multiparticle Production (Directions in High Energy Physics, Advanced)
- Lectures on the Many-Electron Problem, R. Brout and P. Carruthers, Interscience Publishers, 1963
- Introduction to Unitary Symmetry, Peter A. Carruthers, Interscience Publishers, 1966
