= The Stonemason =

Play written by Cormac McCarthy

The Stonemason is a play in five acts by American writer Cormac McCarthy, written in the late 1980s and first performed in 1995. It concerns a Southern black family based on one McCarthy spent many months working with. The play is rarely produced.

== Synopsis ==
This play focuses on the tribulations of the Telfair family over a three-year period. The story is told by monologues of the character Ben Telfair, a thirty-two-year-old third-generation stonemason. Two acts are taken up to provide back-story which involves Ben's choice not to continue college and to take up the family business of stonemasonry.

== Bibliography ==
- Arnold, Edwin T. "Cormac McCarthy's The Stonemason: The Unmaking of a Play." Southern Quarterly 33 (Winter-Spring 1995).
- Josyph, Peter. "Older Professions: The Fourth Wall of The Stonemason." Originally appeared, in different form, in Southern Quarterly 36 (Fall 1997). Reprinted in Myth, Legend, Dust: Critical Responses to Cormac McCarthy. Edited by Rick Wallach. 119–140.
