= David Avnir =

Israeli chemist (born 1947)

Prof. David Avnir
- דוד אבניר
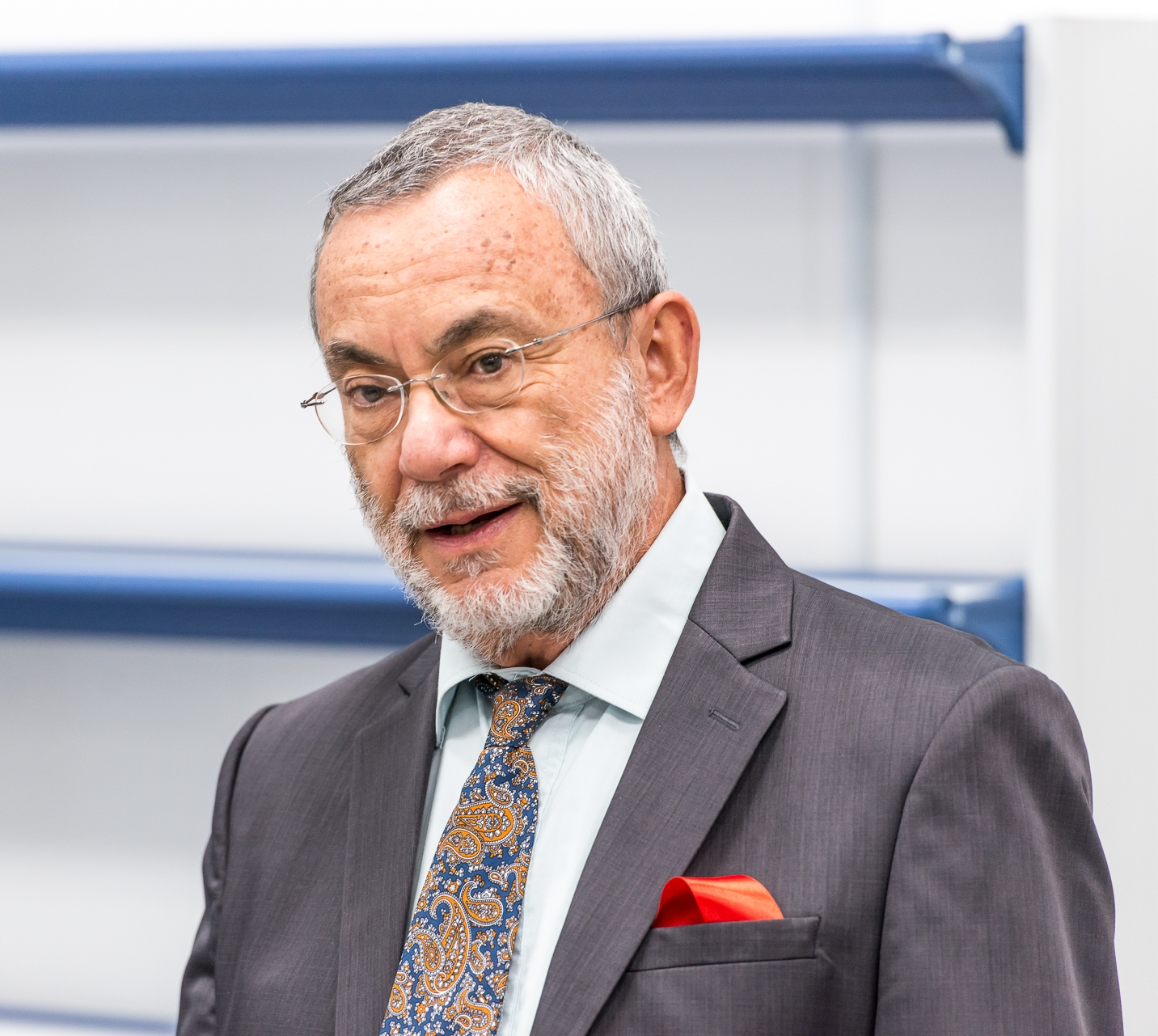
- Born: 12 June 1947 (age 78); Germany
- Citizenship: Israel
- Education: BSc., MSc, and PhD. in Chemistry from The Hebrew University of Jerusalem, 1969–1977. Post-doctoral studies, at the University of Western Ontario, Canada, and at Purdue University, United States, 1978–1979.
- Awards: The Israel Chemical Society Prize (2011), Life-time Achievement Award of the International Sol-Gel Society (2013), Distinguished Scientist, The Chinese Academy of Sciences (2018), Israel Chemical Society Gold Medal (2024)
- Website: Prof. David Avnir Website

Prof. (emeritus) David Avnir (Hebrew: דוד אבניר; born 12 June 1947; St. Ottilien, Germany) is an Israeli Professor of chemistry at the Institute of Chemistry, The Hebrew University of Jerusalem.

His scientific activities include sol-gel materials, molecularly doped metals, chirality and symmetry in experiments and theory. Earlier interests included fractals in chemistry and far-from-equilibrium phenomena. Current interests include also astrochemistry and geochemistry. He has authored and co-authored 420 papers (2025), many of which are highly cited, with an h-index of 87 and over 42,000 citations. Co-founder of the International Sol-Gel Society and its first chairman of the board. A "Highly Ranked Scholar - Lifetime" (in the top 0.05% of all scholars worldwide) according to the most recent (2024) ScholarGPS rankings. Awarded the Israel Chemical Society Gold Medal in 2024.

== Early life and family ==
David Avnir was born in 1947 in a Displaced Persons hospital at the Benedictine archabbey of St. Ottilien, Germany. In 1949 he immigrated to Israel and lived in Jerusalem for all of his childhood and later on for most of his adult life. Married to Dr. Yehudit Avnir (emeritus) of The Paul Baerwald School of Social Work and Social Welfare, The Hebrew University of Jerusalem. They have two children and 4 grandchildren.

== Education ==
Prof. Avnir received his BSc., MSc (Prof. Israel Agranat), and PhD. (Prof. Jochanan Blum) in chemistry from The Hebrew University of Jerusalem during the years 1969–1977. His post-doctoral studies were with Prof. Paul de Mayo, in the University of Western Ontario, Canada, and with Prof. H. Morrison, at Purdue University, United States, during the years 1978–1979.

== Academic positions ==
- Senior Chemist, Teva Pharmaceutical Industries, (1979–1980)

All of the following positions, at The Hebrew University of Jerusalem:

- Lecturer, Institute of Chemistry, (1980–1983)
- Senior Lecturer, Institute of Chemistry, (1983–1985)
- Associate Professor, Institute of Chemistry, (1985–1988)
- Full Professor, Institute of Chemistry, (1988–2016)
- Professor Emeritus, Institute of Chemistry, (2016–present)
- Chairman, School of Chemistry, (1991–1994)
- Head of the Institute of Chemistry, (2007–2010)
- Head of the Graduate Authority in the Experimental Sciences, (2011–2015)

== Founding activities ==
- Founder and Editor-in-Chief, Heterogeneous Chemistry Reviews. (1992–1997)
- Co-founder of Sol-Gel, Inc. (1997)
- Co-Founder and chairman of the board, The International Sol-Gel Society. (2003–2008)
- Scientific advisor and co-founder (2014) of the International Institute for "Solution Chemistry of Advanced Materials and Technologies" (SCAMT) at ITMO University, Saint Petersburg, Russia.

== Research ==
=== Sol-gel materials ===
The sol-gel methodology allows the preparation of glasses and ceramics at room temperature. Avnir's conceptual idea has been to use this low-temperature polymerization process for the incorporation of organic and bioorganic molecules within ceramic materials. Traditionally this has been impossible for glasses and ceramics, because of the very high temperatures employed by these technologies. Following this general concept, the properties of ceramic materials could be altered to create a very wide range of previously unknown materials, by the ability to dope of glasses and ceramics with practically any of the ~40 million organic and bioorganic molecules known today. The many useful applications include materials for optics, reactive materials, bioactive materials, catalysts, sensors and functional aerogels.

=== Molecularly doped metals ===
The family of doped metals was unknown until discovered and developed by Avnir in 2002. The methodology enables the incorporation and entrapment of organic molecules, polymers, bioactive molecules, enzymes and nanoparticles within metals, rendering a metal with unconventional properties such as acidity, luminescence, magnetism or bioactivity.

=== Chirality and symmetry ===
The first focal point of this broad topic has been the formation of new chiral materials, that is, materials which can appear in both left- and right-handed forms. The second, related focal point has been the quantification of geometric symmetry and chirality: Traditionally these have been treated in terms of "either-or", but not as continuous structural properties that can evolve gradually from zero to fully-blown. The chirality/symmetry studies went also beyond chemistry, and have included computerized analysis of symmetry, studies of the bilateral symmetry of Lower Paleolithic hand axes, and chirality in architecture.

=== Fractals ===
An ongoing major challenge has been the quantitative treatment of complex and irregular geometries in the context of the chemistry of materials and surfaces. A comprehensive solution for that problem was proposed by Avnir and his colleague Peter Pfeifer, by adapting fractal geometry to this challenge. Avnir's edited text-book The Fractal Approach to Heterogeneous Chemistry: Surfaces, Colloids, Polymers (Wiley, Chichester, 1992) became a major source in this field and was reprinted several times.

=== Dissipative structures ===
This early work focused on the origin of patterns and structures which form as a result of reactions that solutions of chemicals undergo. Dissipative structures, as such structures are called, have been found for a wide array of different reactions.

=== Astrochemistry and geochemistry ===
Recent activity includes also topics in astrochemistry and geochemistry, particularly chirality aspects. Examples include an analysis of potential chirality indicators of extraterrestrial life; a detailed analysis of the correlation between aqueous alteration of meteorites and the enantiomeric excess of amino acids found in them; and a comprehensive review of chiral minerals.

== Awards and recognition ==
Kaye Award for Applied Research (1998), The First Mehrotra Foundation Lecture (1998), Award Lecture of the Div. of Colloid and Surface Chem. of the Chemical Society of Japan, (1998), The Kolthoff Award of the Technion – Israel Institute of Technology, (2004), The Benjamin H. Birstein Chair in Chemistry (2007), Special issue of Journal of Sol-Gel Science and Technology, honoring Prof. Avnir (2009), Member of the Academia Europaea (2009), The Israel Chemical Society Prize (2011), Life-time Achievement Award of the International Sol-Gel Society (2013), A collection of articles themed on "Hybrid Materials" dedicated to D. Avnir: Nanoscale, (2014), Fellow of the International Sol-Gel Society (2018), Distinguished Scientist, The Chinese Academy of Sciences (2018), Israel Chemical Society Gold Medal (2024).
