= Santa Fe Institute =

Nonprofit theoretical research institute in Santa Fe, New Mexico, US

- Type: Private research institute
- Established: 1984; 42 years ago
- Founders: George Cowan, David Pines, Stirling Colgate, Murray Gell-Mann, Nick Metropolis, Herb Anderson, Peter A. Carruthers, and Richard Slansky
- President: David Krakauer
- Chair: Ian McKinnon
- Location: 1399 Hyde Park Rd., Santa Fe, New Mexico, U.S. 35.7005°N 105.9086°W
- Campus: Urban
- Website: santafe.edu

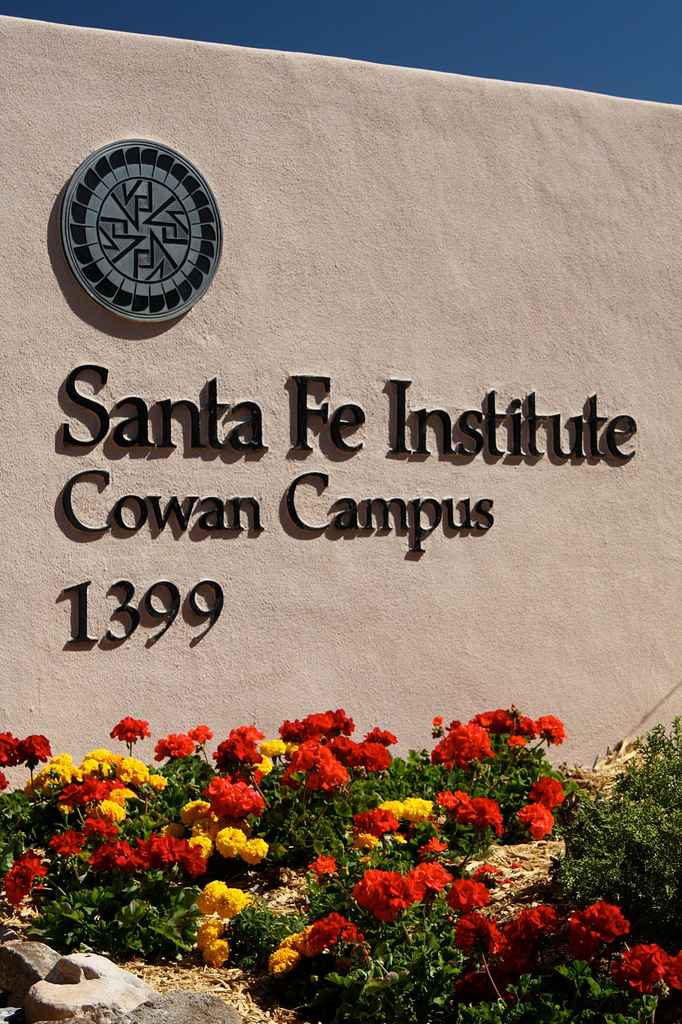
The institute's main gate

The Santa Fe Institute (SFI) is an independent, nonprofit theoretical research institute located in Santa Fe, New Mexico, United States, and dedicated to the multidisciplinary study of the fundamental principles of complex adaptive systems, including physical, computational, biological, and social systems. The institute is ranked 24th among the world's "Top Science and Technology Think Tanks" and 24th among the world's "Best Transdisciplinary Research Think Tanks" according to the 2020 edition of the Global Go To Think Tank Index Reports, published annually by the University of Pennsylvania.

The institute consists of a small number of resident faculty and postdoctoral researchers, a large group of external faculty whose primary appointments are at other institutions, and a number of visiting scholars. The institute is advised by a group of eminent scholars, including several Nobel Prize-winning scientists. Although theoretical scientific research is the institute's primary focus, it also runs several popular summer schools on complex systems, along with other educational and outreach programs aimed at students ranging from middle school up through graduate school.

The institute's annual funding comes from a combination of private donors, grant-making foundations, government science agencies, and companies affiliated with its business network. The 2014 budget was just over $10 million. Evolutionary theorist David Krakauer became the institute's president on August 1, 2015.

== History ==
The Santa Fe Institute was founded in 1984 by scientists George Cowan, David Pines, Stirling Colgate, Murray Gell-Mann, Nick Metropolis, Herb Anderson, Peter A. Carruthers, and Richard Slansky. All but Pines and Gell-Mann were scientists with Los Alamos National Laboratory. Originally called the "Rio Grande Institute", the scientists sought a forum to conduct theoretical research outside the traditional disciplinary boundaries of academic departments and government agency science budgets.

SFI's original mission was to disseminate the notion of a new interdisciplinary research area called complexity theory or simply complex systems. This new effort was intended to provide an alternative to the increasing specialization the founders observed in science by focusing on synthesis across disciplines. As the idea of interdisciplinary science increased in popularity, a number of independent institutes and departments emerged whose focus emphasized similar goals.

The Santa Fe Institute was created to be a visiting institution, with no permanent or tenured positions, a small group of resident faculty and postdoctoral researchers, a large visitors program, and a larger group of external faculty affiliated with the institute but located at other institutions. The motivation of this structure was to encourage active turnover in ideas and people, allowing the research to remain on the cutting edge of interdisciplinary science. Today, the Santa Fe Institute continues to follow this organizational model.

== Organization ==
The institute is composed of several distinct groups. The resident faculty are researchers whose primary appointment is at the institute. Along with the Omidyar Fellows, a group of postdoctoral scholars in residence, the resident faculty makes up the majority of the researchers physically present at the institute. The external ("fractal") faculty is a group of roughly 100 affiliated researchers whose primary appointments are at other institutions, typically universities. These individuals form a large and distributed community of scholars who frequently visit the Institute and contribute to its overall research program. The institute's Applied Complexity Network, formerly the Business Network, is a group of private companies and government agencies interested in complex systems research. Members of the business network often send representatives to Institute meetings or to serve as research fellows in residence at the institute. The institute's Science Board is a large group of eminent scholars who advise the institute on important strategic matters. This group includes a number of Nobel Prize winners.

The institute is headed by a president, currently evolutionary theorist David Krakauer, and a vice president for science, currently network ecologist Jennifer Dunne. It is governed by a Board of Trustees, which is chaired by Katherine Collins of Putnam Investments.

== Research ==
Research at the institute focuses on systems commonly described as complex adaptive systems or simply complex systems. Recent research has included studies of evolutionary computation, metabolic and ecological scaling laws, the fundamental properties of cities, the evolutionary diversification of viral strains, the interactions and conflicts of primate social groups, the history of languages, the structure and dynamics of species interactions including food webs, the dynamics of financial markets, and the emergence of hierarchy and cooperation in the human species, and biological and technological innovation.

Historically, researchers affiliated with the institute played roles to varying degrees in the development and use of methods for studying complex systems, including agent-based modeling, network theory, computational immunology, the physics of financial markets, genetic algorithms, the physics of computation, and machine learning.

The institute also studies foundational topics in the physics and mathematics of complex systems, using tools from related disciplines such as information theory, combinatorics, computational complexity theory and condensed matter physics. Recent research in this area has included studies of phase transitions in NP-hard problems.

Some of the institute's accomplishments include:

- Complexity research which led to efforts to create artificial life modeling real organisms and ecosystems in the 1980s and 1990s.
- Foundational contributions to the field of chaos theory.
- Foundational contributions to the field of genetic algorithms.
- Foundational contributions to the complexity economics school of thought.
- Foundational contributions to the field of econophysics.
- Foundational contributions to the field of complex networks.
- Foundational contributions to the field of systems biology.
- The "Evolution of Human Languages" project, an attempt to trace all human language to a common ancestor (Proto-Human language).
- The "Maya Working Group" which has investigated the origins and development of complexity for the Maya civilization.
- The "Cities, scaling, & sustainability" project to understand cities from a quantitative and interdisciplinary approach (urban scaling).

== Educational programs ==
The Santa Fe Institute runs a number of education programs aimed at introducing students as young as middle school and as old as graduate school to the core ideas of complex systems. The longest running education program is the annual Complex Systems Summer School (CSSS). The CSSS hosts 50–60 graduate students and early postdocs, along with select Business Network fellows, for a four-week course on complex systems. Lectures are provided by Institute researchers, and students work on a small collaborative project on complex systems.

The institute also awards an annual High School Prize for Scientific Excellence to a local high school student and a local teacher.

The educational programs include:

- Complex Systems Summer School (graduate and postdoctoral level)
- Graduate Workshop in Computational Social Science (graduate level)
- Global Sustainability Summer School (graduate level)
- Research Experiences for Undergraduates (undergraduate level)

Since the 1980s, the Santa Fe Institute has held a series of public lectures, which generally take place at the Lensic Center in downtown Santa Fe. Typically 5–6 talks are held each year, normally by visiting external faculty of the institute. Attendance at these lectures is free of charge, and in recent years many of the talks are recorded and made available on video platforms such as YouTube

The Santa Fe Institute has also launched a series of massive open online courses on complex systems, the first of which began in early 2013.

In October 2019, The Santa Fe Institute launched Complexity Podcast, a general-audience weekly science discussion program featuring long-form interviews with SFI researchers.

== Ties to Jeffrey Epstein ==
Institute co-founder Murray Gell-Mann was an associate and grant recipient of Jeffrey Epstein. Gell-Mann acknowledged financial support from Jeffrey Epstein, who contributed via the Santa Fe Institute. In 2003, Gell-Mann also contributed a letter to The First Fifty Years, a collection of birthday greetings for Epstein. Years later, in 2011, Gell-Mann reportedly attended the "Mindshift Conference" on Little Saint James, Epstein's private island. The gathering was organized by Epstein and science promoter Al Seckel. Gell-Mann's name also appeared in Epstein's so-called "black book," a personal address book listing Epstein's close contacts. In 2025, Ghislaine Maxwell testified that Gell-Mann had originally been introduced to Epstein through her.

According to the Times Higher Education's analysis of the Epstein files, Geoffrey West, a British theoretical physicist and former president and distinguished professor at the Santa Fe Institute, agreed to meet Epstein at Zorro Ranch in 2012.

== Notable spin-offs ==
- BiosGroup
- Swarm Development Group
- Prediction Company

== Presidents ==
Since its inception in 1984, the Santa Fe Institute has had 7 presidents.

| SFI President | Tenure | Bio |
|---|---|---|
| George Cowan | 1984–1991 | Served 39 years at Los Alamos National Laboratory as the director of chemistry, associate director of research, and senior laboratory fellow. |
| Edward Alan Knapp | 1991–1995 | Director of the National Science Foundation from 1982 to 1985. |
| Ellen Goldberg | 1996–2003 | Chair of the Immunology Division of the American Society for Microbiology, Chair of the National Science Foundation Biological Sciences Advisory Committee. |
| Robert Eisenstein | 2003–2004 | Director of the National Science Foundation Physics Division. |
| Geoffrey West | 2005–2009 | Founder of the high energy physics group at Los Alamos National Laboratory. |
| Jerry Sabloff | 2009–2015 | Chair of the Smithsonian Science Commission. |
| David Krakauer | 2015–present | Director of the Wisconsin Institutes for Discovery. |

== See also ==
- Big History
- Plectics
- Systems thinking
- Cliodynamics
- Social physics
- Network science
- Information theory
