= David Krakauer (scientist) =

American evolutionary biologist (born 1967)

David C. Krakauer
- Born: December 28, 1967 (age 57); Hawaii, US
- Education: Royal Holloway University of London; University of Oxford
- Relatives: John W. Krakauer (brother)
- Scientific career
- Institutions: University of Cambridge; Institute for Advanced Study; Santa Fe Institute
- Thesis: Cognitive ecology: a theoretical perspective (1995)
- Doctoral advisor: Alasdair I. Houston; Mark Pagel

David C. Krakauer (born December 28, 1967) is an American evolutionary biologist. He is the president and William H. Miller Professor of Complex Systems at the Santa Fe Institute.

== Biography ==
Born in Hawaii, Krakauer grew up in southern Portugal and moved to London, England, for secondary school.

He attended Royal Holloway University of London, where he earned degrees in computer science and mathematics. He received his DPhil in evolutionary theory from Oxford University in 1995, under the supervision of Alasdair Houston and Mark Pagel. He stayed on as a postdoctoral research fellow.

== Career ==
Krakauer has held positions as a visiting fellow at the Penn Genome Frontiers Institute at the University of Pennsylvania, Sage Fellow at the SAGE Center for the Study of the Mind at the University of California, Santa Barbara, a long-term fellow of the Institute for Advanced Study in Princeton, New Jersey, and visiting professor of evolution at Princeton University.

At the University of Wisconsin-Madison, he served as the founding director of the Wisconsin Institute for Discovery, the co-director of the Center for Complexity and Collective Computation, and professor of mathematical genetics.

Since 2015, Krakauer has served as the president and William H. Miller Professor of Complex Systems at the Santa Fe Institute. He previously served as the institute's faculty chair and as a resident professor and an external professor. He also co-directs the Collective Computation Group (C4) at the Santa Fe Institute.

Krakauer was included in Wired Magazine's Smart List 2012 as one of fifty people "who will change the world".
