= The Gardener's Son =

1977 television film written by Cormac McCarthy

- DVD cover
- Genre: Historical drama
- Based on: The Gardener's Son: A Screenplay by Cormac McCarthy
- Screenplay by: Cormac McCarthy
- Directed by: Richard Pearce
- Starring: Brad Dourif; Kevin Conway; Nan Martin; Jerry Hardin; Anne O'Sullivan; Penny Allen; Ned Beatty; Paul Benjamin
- Composer: Charles Gross
- Country of origin: United States
- Original language: English

Production
- Executive producer: Barbara Schultz
- Producers: Michael Hausman; Richard Pearce
- Cinematography: Fred Murphy
- Editor: Norman Gay
- Running time: 113 minutes
- Production company: KCET
- Budget: $200,000

Original release
- Network: PBS
- Release: January 6, 1977

The Gardener's Son is a 1977 American historical crime drama television film directed by Richard Pearce and written by Cormac McCarthy. Set in the company town of Graniteville, South Carolina during the Reconstruction era, the story is based on a real historical 1876 murder and subsequent trial. The Gardener's Son dramatizes the tensions between the working-class McEvoy family and the wealthy Greggs, whose patriarch owned the town cotton mill. Brad Dourif stars as Robert McEvoy, a disgruntled amputee who in 1876 killed James Gregg (Kevin Conway). The plot presents the complex material and psychological conditions for the crime while leaving the ultimate question of motive ambiguous.

The public television station KCET produced the film as the twelfth entry in its anthology series Visions. Pearce, known as a documentarian, was new to filming a fictionalized story. He learned of the story of the McEvoys and Greggs in a footnote from a biography of William Gregg, an influential industrialist and father of James. Impressed by McCarthy's novel Child of God (1973), Pearce asked the author to write what would be his first screenplay. While developing the screenplay, McCarthy and Pearce spent several months researching the circumstances of the murder, the community's reaction to the crime, and the socioeconomic conditions in Graniteville during the period.

Though set in South Carolina, The Gardener's Son was mostly filmed around Burlington, North Carolina and partly in Virginia. It was shot on location at historical sites that had been scouted for their period accuracy, far from the visible encroachments of modern technology like powerlines. Other members of the cast included Nan Martin, Jerry Hardin, Anne O'Sullivan, Penny Allen, Ned Beatty, and Paul Benjamin, plus 34 nonprofessional actors from around North Carolina cast in bit parts. Charles Gross composed the spare, Appalachian-influenced score.

The Gardener's Son premiered on PBS stations on January 6, 1977, to positive reviews. It has remained out of print on home video for decades, seeing a small-scale DVD release in 2010. McCarthy's screenplay was published as a book by Ecco Press in 1996, containing scenes and lines cut from the film version. Because of its general unavailability, The Gardener's Son is commonly experienced only as a closet drama to be read, rather than a film to be watched. The film is remembered for its pivotal place in McCarthy's career as his first dramatic work, his first work of historical fiction, and his first time participating in a film production. Despite several further efforts at screenwriting, McCarthy would not get a second original screenplay made into a film until The Counselor (2013).

== Plot ==
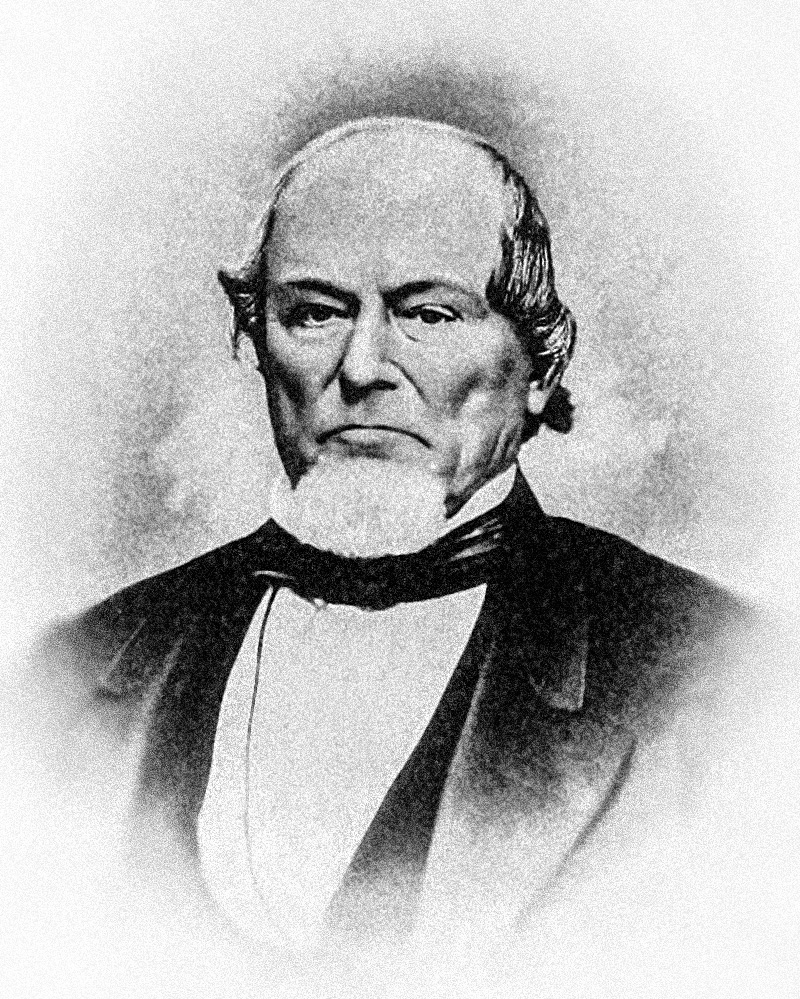
Undated portrait of William Gregg (1800–1867), industrialist and patriarch of the Gregg family

Dr. Perceval makes a house call to the Gregg estate in the company town of Graniteville, South Carolina. William Gregg, the owner of the town cotton mill, is declared dead following an illness. The doctor and Mrs. Gregg then visit the home of Patrick McEvoy, a gardener employed by the Greggs, to attend to his son Robert. Robert's leg had earlier been broken in an industrial accident, for which William's son James may be at fault. Seeing that the leg has become badly infected, Mrs. Gregg convinces Robert to assent to amputation. William Gregg is buried in a well-attended ceremony with an adulatory eulogy.

Robert, now equipped with a prosthetic leg and crutch, takes a job sweeping up at the mill. A group of impoverished people come by train to Graniteville seeking work but James, now the mill's owner, turns them away. Over supper, with Robert absent, the McEvoys discuss his perplexing, troubled nature. Mrs. Gregg and James visit the grave of an unnamed boy who died visiting Graniteville in 1855. James chides his mother for her paternalistic concern for the poor. Robert's 14-year-old sister Martha, who works spinning cotton, goes looking for Robert and finds James, who makes lewd remarks and offers to pay her a gold piece, prompting her to flee. Mr. Giles, an assistant at the mill, finds Patrick in his glasshouse and inquires after Robert, who has been absent from work. Patrick answers that he does not know his son's whereabouts.

Some time later, Martha writes a letter to Robert telling him "mama has took sick again" and that she and her father wish he would return home. Robert hops off a horse-drawn cart and drives away two black gravediggers when he discovers they are burying his mother, who he says "don't belong to the mill." Robert finds his father's glasshouse barren and learns he is no longer employed as a gardener. That night Robert drinks whiskey and commiserates with employees of the mill, including Pinky. The next morning, Robert wakes up in a barn. As Patrick starts his shift at the mill, he learns his son has returned. Robert confronts James in his office. After an argument ensues, James surmises that Robert is there begging for money and offers him a gold piece. Robert draws a pistol. James reaches for a desk drawer. Robert shoots him in the stomach and exits the mill. James stumbles outside and fires at Robert, missing. Robert returns fire, killing James. Patrick and other mill employees walk outside.

Robert stands trial, accused of murder. The prosecutor reads an opening statement before a majority-black jury. Mr. Giles and another witness testify. After trial, Robert's attorney O. C. Jordan speaks with a discouraged Patrick, telling him that he is confident Robert will go free, and that it would be unwise for Robert to testify as doing so would risk an unpopular sullying of the Gregg name. Jordan also reveals that the defense has agreed with Mrs. Gregg to avoid calling any female witnesses. A constable asks Patrick to return home to bury his wife, as neighbors can smell her corpse 4 houses away. Patrick breaks down and cries. Starks Sims, a boy who works for Mr. Giles, testifies that he witnessed Robert shoot James. W. J. Whipper, a black attorney for Robert's defense, cross-examines Starks; Whipper asks if Starks had ever read any notes written by James to any female employees of the mill. Starks replies that he had never done so because he is illiterate. That night, Patrick goes to ask Whipper to have Robert testify and Whipper responds that it would not be possible because of Robert's erratic nature, but reassures Patrick and counsels him about the limitations of the law.

At trial, Robert is sentenced to death. Martha goes to Mrs. Gregg, apparently to plead her brother's innocence, but then tells Mrs. Gregg that James "never done nothing" to her. Believing Martha is there to console her, Mrs. Gregg takes ease and asks her servant Daphne to bring tea. Martha says that the Greggs "must have failed him somewhere". Martha says she wonders what she would have said if asked to testify and speculates that she would have told about the gold piece, but downplays its significance. Enraged, Mrs. Gregg orders her to leave.

Robert poses in a studio for a portrait photograph taken, seated, from the waist up, taking care that his legs not be shown. The photographer asks if copies might be made to print for sale, with half of the proceeds to go to his family. Robert replies that he does not mind if people are ignorant enough to buy his image, but does not want his family to know where any proceeds are sent from. In the street, Martha encounters Robert, who says he was never meant to be hanged and should have gone to the penitentiary. Martha says she would have testified and told "any kind of lie" in his defense. Robert tells her to forget she had a brother and to find the best man she can and make him treat her right. Robert is executed by hanging. Dr. Perceval declares the time of death. Patrick takes his son's body in a coffin onto a cart and rides away.

== Cast ==
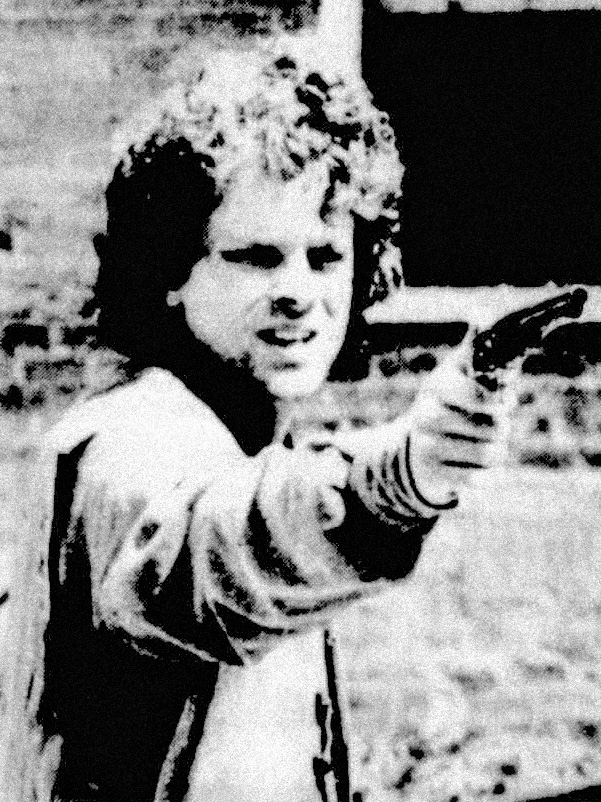
Dourif

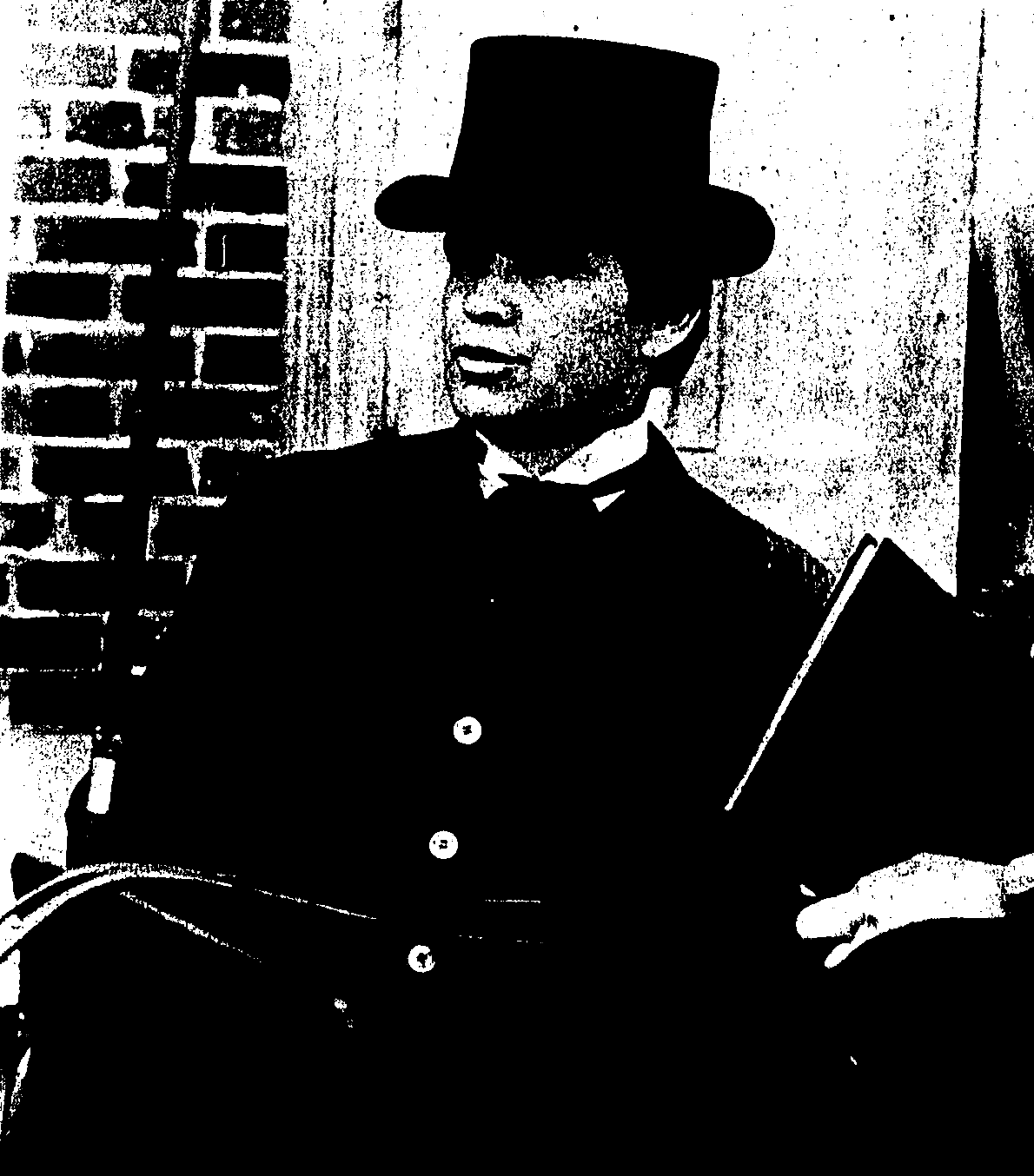
McCarthy

Brad Dourif starred as Robert McEvoy, the man who shot James Gregg. Screenwriter Cormac McCarthy made a brief cameo as a stockholder in the mill.
- Brad Dourif as Robert McEvoy
- Kevin Conway as James Gregg
- Nan Martin as Mrs. Gregg
- Jerry Hardin as Patrick McEvoy
- Anne O'Sullivan as Martha McEvoy
- Penny Allen as Mrs. McEvoy
- Ned Beatty as Pinky
- Paul Benjamin as W. J. Whipper

In addition to the professional cast, 34 bit parts were played by nonprofessional local residents from the around area in North Carolina where principal photography took place. Among the nonprofessional actors are:

- Earl Wynn (Note: Earl Wynn, Martha Nell Hardy, and Walter Spearman were professors at the University of North Carolina at Chapel Hill and community theatre performers. Wynn, recently retired, had been a professor of radio, television, and motion pictures; Hardy taught speech and Spearman taught journalism. Hardy told The Daily Tar Heel, "I think the film is very sensitively done and is a beautiful piece, unusual.") as Dr. Perceval
- Austin L. Skipwith (Note: Austin L. Skipwith, who played the already dead William Gregg, had no lines and is not listed in the end credits. He was a direct descendant of Sir Peyton Skipwith, 7th Baronet, of the English Skipwith baronets, who built the Virginia Prestwould plantation where the death scene was shot. In fact, Skipwith had been born in the same antique bed in which he played dead for The Gardener's Son.) as William Gregg
- Esther W. Tate as Daphne
- Helen Harmon (Note: Helen Harmon was a child actor from Asheville, North Carolina who had previously performed in the film Where the Lilies Bloom (1974).) as Maryellen McEvoy
- Dwight Hunsucker (Note: Dwight Hunsucker was a Chapel Hill resident.) as Mr. Giles
- Lish Burchette as First Gravedigger
- Ellis Williams as Second Gravedigger
- Martha Nell Hardy as Old Woman
- Ty Stevens (Note: According to Pearce, Ty Stevens served as his advisor on the film's depiction of "good old boys".) as First Man in Doggery
- Walter Spearman as Mill Worker
- Larry Lambeth as O. C. Jordan
- John Robbins as Constable
- Malcolm Black (Note: Malcolm Black was a sophomore attending Orange High School in Orange County, North Carolina.) as Stark Sims
- William Seals (Note: William Seals was a friend of McCarthy's from Knoxville, Tennessee, and his appearance in The Gardener's Son was publicized ahead of its broadcast in the Knoxville News-Sentinel.) as Virgil

Cormac McCarthy makes a brief, uncredited cameo appearance in a non-speaking role as a stockholding investor in the mill. His cameo occurs just before the scene of the killing. Dressed in a dark coat and top hat, he can be spotted within a crowd of fellow businessmen on a tour of the mill, distinguishable as the youngest-looking member of the group. Stacey Peebles—a scholar of McCarthy's works—likened his small role to Alfred Hitchcock's famous cameos in his own films, though rendered ironic by the fact that the obscure author would have been unrecognizable to the viewing audience.

== Development ==
=== Background on Visions series ===
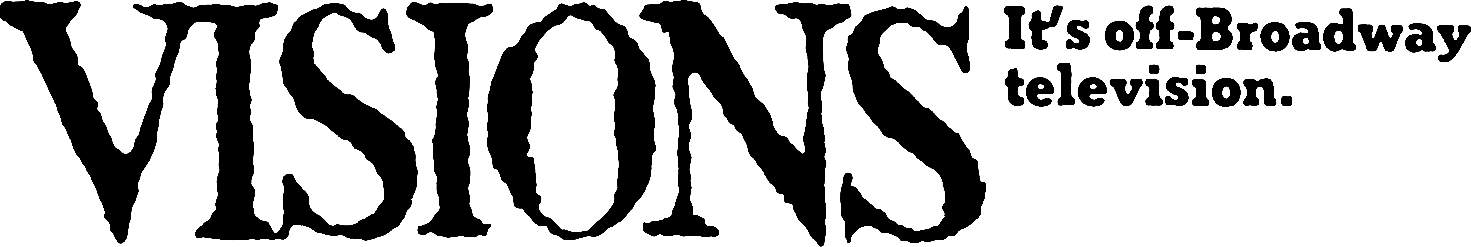
Visions series logo with slogan:
"It's off-Broadway television."

The Gardener's Son was produced by KCET, a Los Angeles-based PBS affiliate station, as the twelfth installment in its Visions series of made-for-television drama films. The series sought out original teleplays by American writers with no prior experience in television. Many of the films were historical dramas, like The Gardener's Son. Visions often addressed serious social issues with "a deliberate pace far removed from the forced urgency of commercial television", and served as "a proving ground for drama on public television as well as for talented actors, directors and writers". Advertising materials pitched Visions as "Off-Broadway television".

Production of The Gardener's Son cost $200,000. Its budget reflected the average expenditure for entries in the Visions series, each made with much less money than the typical hour-long episode of major network era dramas. (Note: By comparison, in 1977 the cost to produce a one-hour episode of the hit police procedural Hawaii Five-O was $385,000.) Funding was provided by the National Endowment for the Arts, the Ford Foundation, and the Corporation for Public Broadcasting.

=== Conception ===
In the mid-1970s, Richard Pearce was known for his work as a cinematographer on documentary films such as Hearts and Minds (1974). Pearce had come across the story of while conducting research on a journalism grant from the Alicia Patterson Foundation. He was using the grant funds to research the lives of Southern textile workers in the late 19th century. He became interested in the 1876 murder of James Gregg by Robert McEvoy after reading about it in the footnote of a history book, later learning that the story had endured in local folklore. Pearce went to Graniteville and spoke with many descendants of the original textile workers who came to the town in the 1840s, who he said "still tell Robert McEvoy's story—stories, I should say, because there are now at least eight or nine different versions." Pearce pitched the story to Vision, and he was commissioned to direct and co-produce an episode. It would mark his first effort in fictional filmmaking.

It is not about one character. It is about two families and the strange circumstances surrounding the death of James Gregg. It is really the story of the mill in those times. And it is very much the story of William Gregg, who was very much beloved by his mill-town people. The town was his garden.

— Pearce, speaking to the press, 1977

Pearce consulted Tom Terrill, an economic historian at University of South Carolina. Terrill later published the article "Murder in Graniteville", giving an authoritative account of McEvoy's murder of Gregg. Terrill identified Pearce's source for the McEvoy–Gregg story as Broadus Mitchell's 1928 biography of William Gregg, owner of the Graniteville mill and one of the most significant industrialists of the Antebellum South. Mitchell's biography is a flattering portrayal of the elder Gregg, with a highly positive assessment of his patricianly leadership during the period of rapid industrialization. Gregg viewed the South's transition from an agrarian to a manufacturing-based economy as a means of enriching the general welfare of ordinary people and reducing poverty. Mitchell's biography characterized Robert McEvoy's crime as an act of thoughtless violence perpetrated by the "bad boy of the village". Contrarily, Terrill analyzed it as a vindictive eruption of class consciousness by an alienated worker against a capitalist. Pearce conducted and taped original interviews with Graniteville residents in 1974 and exchanged research materials with Terrill.

=== Research and screenwriting ===
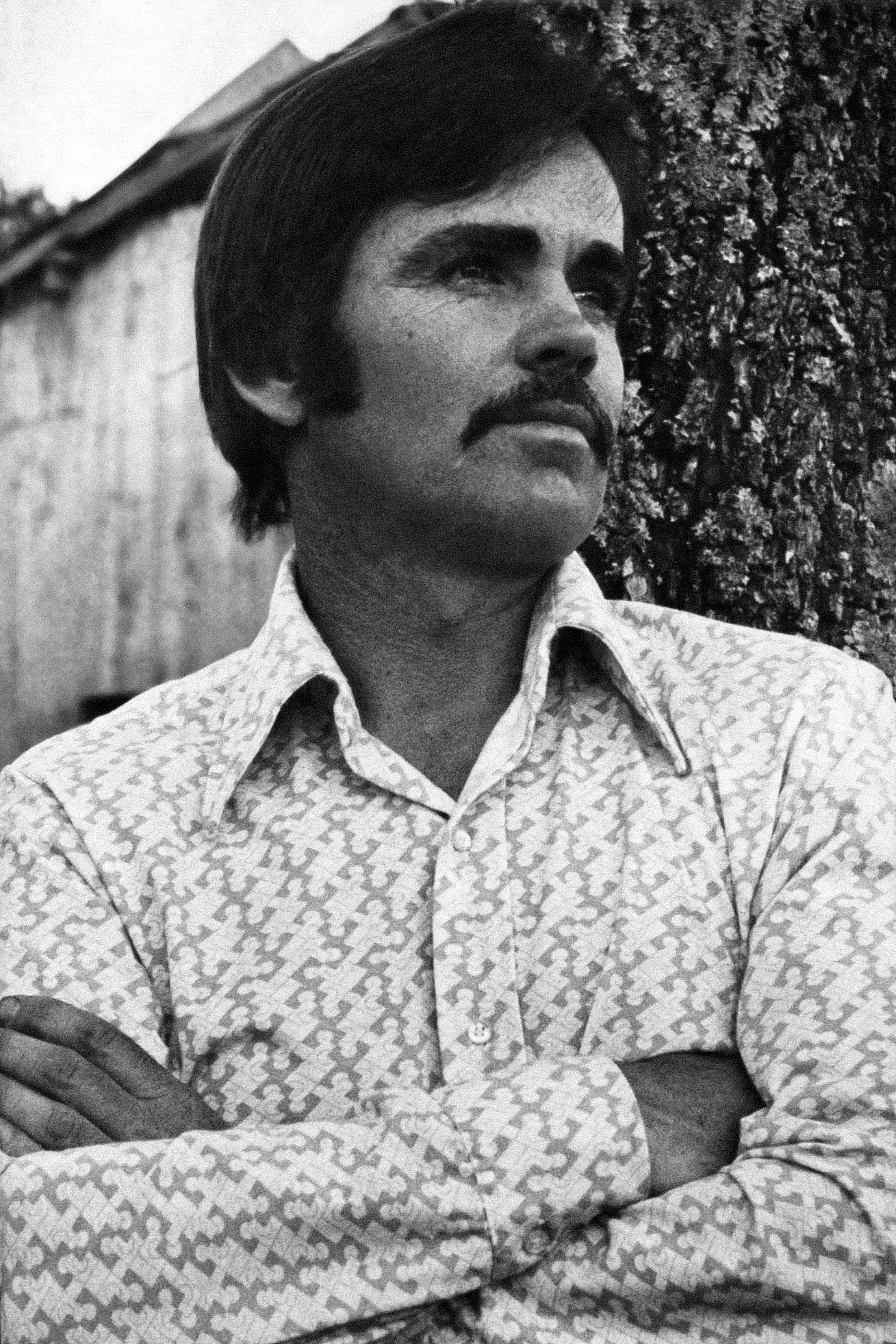
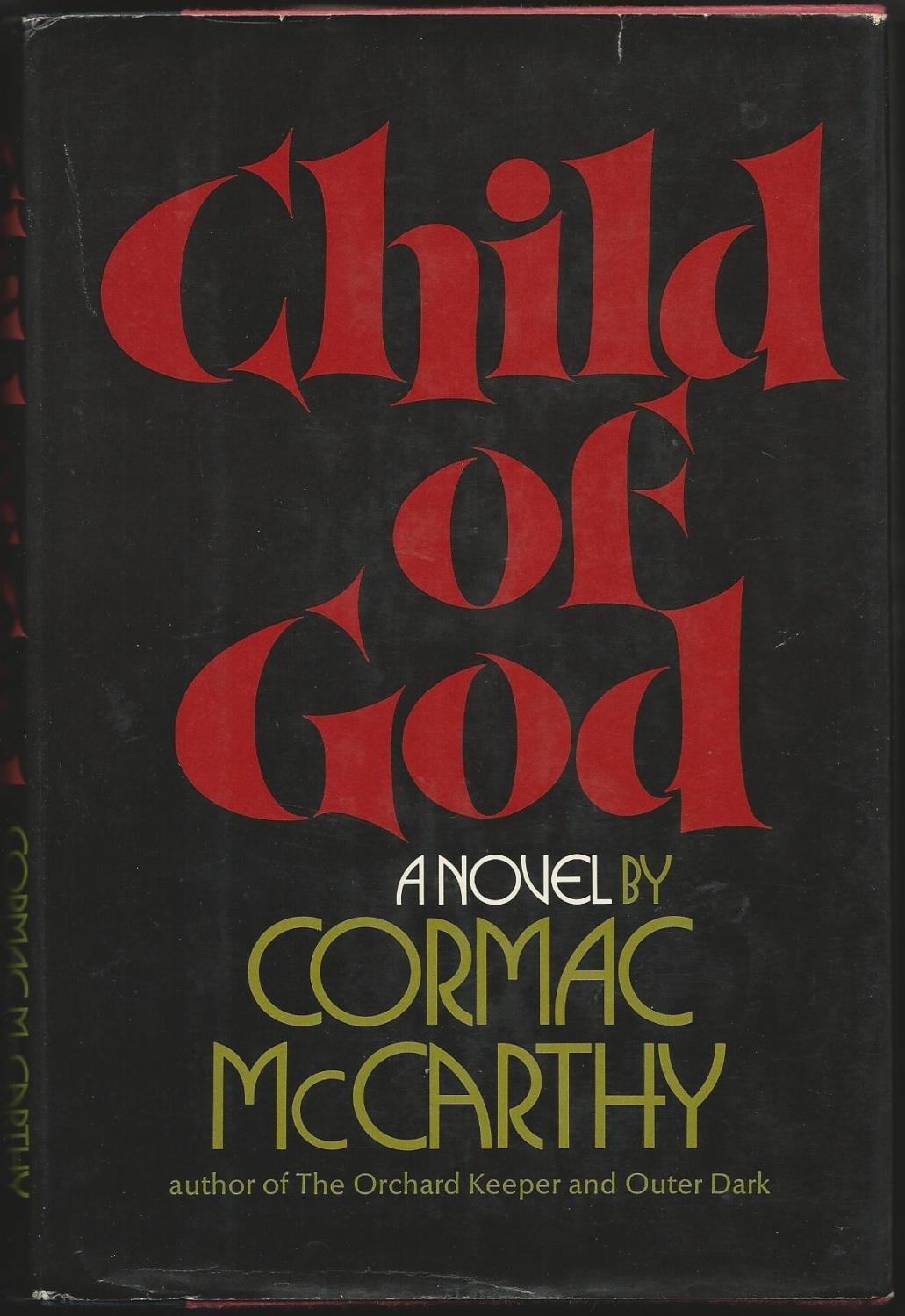
McCarthy was asked to write a screenplay on the strength of his third novel, Child of God (1973). Pearce had been impressed by its demonstration of McCarthy's "Negative Capability".

Pearce asked the novelist Cormac McCarthy to adapt the story of the McEvoys and the Greggs into a dramatic screenplay. (Note: Pearce also claimed to have reached out to Eudora Welty as a potential screenwriter.) To reach the author, whom he did not know personally, he sent a postcard to a P.O. box in El Paso, Texas. (Note: According to a January 1977 newspaper article, McCarthy had been in Mexico "working on a novel". He was then a resident of Tennessee, though he would later move to El Paso full-time. The novel in question would be Blood Meridian (1985), which McCarthy started researching in the Southwest in 1974.) McCarthy was an obscure novelist at the time and had no prior experience in filmmaking. (Note: McCarthy had taken an active interest in managing the film rights of his first two novels, The Orchard Keeper (1965) and Outer Dark (1968), which had been considered for cinematic adaptation but ultimately passed over. He also claimed "motion picture acting" among various odd jobs he claimed to have held in a questionnaire submitted to his publisher, Random House, in 1964.) Pearce had been impressed by McCarthy's third and most recent novel, Child of God (1973), which tells the story of an alienated Appalachian man's descent into necrophilia and murder. Already acquainted with the author's early work, Pearce felt especially impressed by the latest novel:

Child of God, the oddest of a wonderfully odd lot, had been the one that struck me. It was easily the most cinematic, but not in the conventional sense of the term. It had a rigor about it, a way of not taking the easy, 'novelistic' route. By never presuming an author's license to enter the mind of his protagonist, McCarthy had been able to insure the almost complete inscrutability of his subject and subject matter, while at the same time thoroughly investigating it. Here was "Negative Capability" of a very high order. I was hooked.

Pearce and McCarthy collaborated on the screenplay, working between motels in South Carolina and McCarthy's residence in Blount County, Tennessee. Research lasted from early April to November 19, 1975, as documented in a series of "research newsletters" sent by Pearce to the Alicia Patterson Foundation. Pearce had already found many primary sources and public records for McCarthy to use as reference material. McCarthy's primary responsibility was dramatization of the historical material, though he soon became just as engaged with the research as Pearce. The work brought them to the courthouse in Aiken and newspaper archives housed in Augusta, Georgia; McCarthy remarked that the latter were more useful.

We used all the facts—all the names are those of actual people involved. It is as accurate as possible, but it was a reconstruction of the events.

— McCarthy, speaking to the press, 1977

As their work continued, Pearce and McCarthy uncovered numerous historical details that complicated Mitchell's rosy narrative of the Gregg family and their impact on the regional economy. They learned of an 1875 labor strike responding to docked wages and an 1877 petition to the governor, bearing hundreds of signatures, requesting that he commute McEvoy's death sentence. "We spent four weeks," McCarthy said, "in South Carolina researching the thing—in Columbia I even found a 22-page letter McEvoy had written Gov. Wade Hampton. And even then no one was quite sure why McEvoy did it. He just came into Gregg's office one day and shot him."

Pearce and McCarthy decided to leave the question of Robert McEvoy's motive purposely ambiguous. McCarthy told the Burlington Daily Times-News that the killing happened for no apparent reason, or "at least no single, clearly-defined reason, but obviously occurred because of a multiplicity of intertwined ideas and relationships that took their toll on the boy who was to become a murder". (Note: A nearly identical statement appears in the Knoxville News-Sentinel's January 1977 profile of McCarthy, though it is presented within the journalist's prose as part of the article text itself, not as a quote attributed to McCarthy nor anyone else: "The killing apparently took place for no reason, at least no single, clearly-defined reason, but obviously occurred because of a multiplicity of intertwined ideas and relationships that took their toll on the boy who was to become a murderer." See Luce & Turpin 2022, p. 127.) Pearce aimed to achieve a plausible, authentic portrayal of the character's emotional state without definitively spelling out the factors that cause the killing. The narrative's uncertainty and complexity, Pearce said, were "a reaction against the type of movies on TV" in which "[n]othing is left open to several interpretations, nothing is left to the imagination. I bent over backwards to avoid doing that. In so many movies, the motives and characters are too clearly defined. Life isn't that way."

McCarthy valued verisimilitude and drew every named character in The Gardener's Son from a verifiable person in the historical record. Beyond historical and literary influences, McCarthy likely drew cinematic inspiration from film titles listed in his archived notes, such as Black Orpheus (1959), La Dolce Vita (1960), In Cold Blood (1967), and The Great Gatsby (1974). Like the McEvoys, McCarthy remarked he too had grown up Irish Catholic in the South within majority-Protestant communities. Regarding Robert McEvoy's status as "a black sheep, the bad boy of the town," McCarthy said: "That was familiar to me, too. The kid was a natural rebel, probably just a troublemaker in real life. But in our film he has a certain nobility. He stands up and says, 'No, this is intolerable and I want to do something about it!'"

== Production ==
=== Casting ===
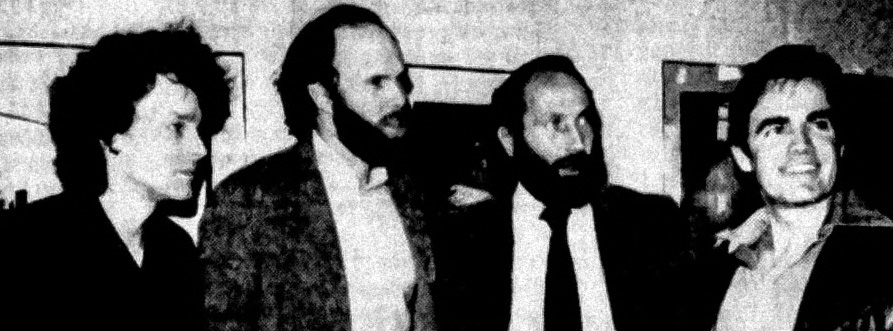
Top cast and crew (left to right: Dourif, Pearce, Hausman, and McCarthy) at a press conference in Graham, North Carolina on March 23, 1976, promoting local auditions.

Casting was primarily handled by co-producer Michael Hausman, whose previous experience included Miloš Forman's Taking Off (1971) and Elaine May's The Heartbreak Kid (1972) and Mikey and Nicky (1976). "We stressed to the actors," Hausman said, "that this is a 'prestige' venture rather than a profit-making one, since we obviously couldn't offer larger salaries." Despite the modest budget, Pearce said he found casting straightforward because the quality of writing provided by McCarthy drew actors' attention.

Brad Dourif, cast in the lead role of Robert McEvoy, told the press he chose to join the project for its screenplay. Dourif had recently been nominated for the Academy Award for Best Supporting Actor for his role in One Flew Over the Cuckoo's Nest (1975). Hausman convinced Ned Beatty to play the role of Pinky by scheduling his scene to be filmed when he could stop en route to New York from an unrelated shoot further south. The main cast is rounded out by Kevin Conway, Nan Martin, Anne O'Sullivan, Penny Allen, Jerry Hardin, and Paul Beatty.

More than 100 North Carolinians participated as extras, while another 34 locals had bit parts. Auditions were held in Winston-Salem, Charlotte, Raleigh, and Chapel Hill. With less than a week before filming, the production still needed more adult men as extras for crowd shots, so Pearce, McCarthy, Dourif, and Hausman held a press conference on March 23, 1976, at the arts center in Graham, North Carolina to publicize further auditions in the area. Some parts—like those of the black gravediggers—were cast informally through a truck driver Pearce met at a gas station in Burlington, who he called his "unofficial casting agency" and "one of [his] most valuable contacts".

=== Locations and principal photography ===
- Map of filming locations in North Carolina and Virginia (plus the story's historical setting of Graniteville, South Carolina)

Though the story is set in South Carolina, The Gardener's Son was mostly filmed in North Carolina. The location scouting process had led Pearce and McCarthy to consider sites in South Carolina and Georgia. Their main concern was period accuracy, without for example visible power lines in the background or modern aluminum siding on buildings. The crew and lead cast used the city of Burlington as their central base from which to travel for locations shoots.

Cinematographer Fred Murphy shot The Gardener's Son in color on 16 mm film. Other major crew members on set included art director Patrizia von Brandenstein and costume designer Ruth Morley. Principal photography lasted from March 29 to May 7, 1976, amid an unseasonably warm spring heat wave.

Filming began at the restored cotton mill in Glencoe, where the majority of the shoot occurred. The Glencoe mill came to the crew's attention through Brent Glass, (Note: Glass was then employed by the State Archives of North Carolina.) who was conducting a survey of the region's historic industrial architecture. Glencoe was used for exterior scenes at the mill, while mill interiors were shot at Baxter, Faust & Kelly Co. textile mill in Worthville near Asheboro. Other shooting locations in the Burlington area included a local greenhouse and the cemetery at St. Paul's Episcopal Church (Note: Most sources describe it as St. Paul's Episcopal Church, though one labels it St. Paul's Lutheran Church.) in Alamance near the Alamance Battleground. Farther locations were the Caswell County Courthouse and city jailhouse in Yanceyville; and the Prestwould plantation across the state border in Clarksville, Virginia.

Filming locations

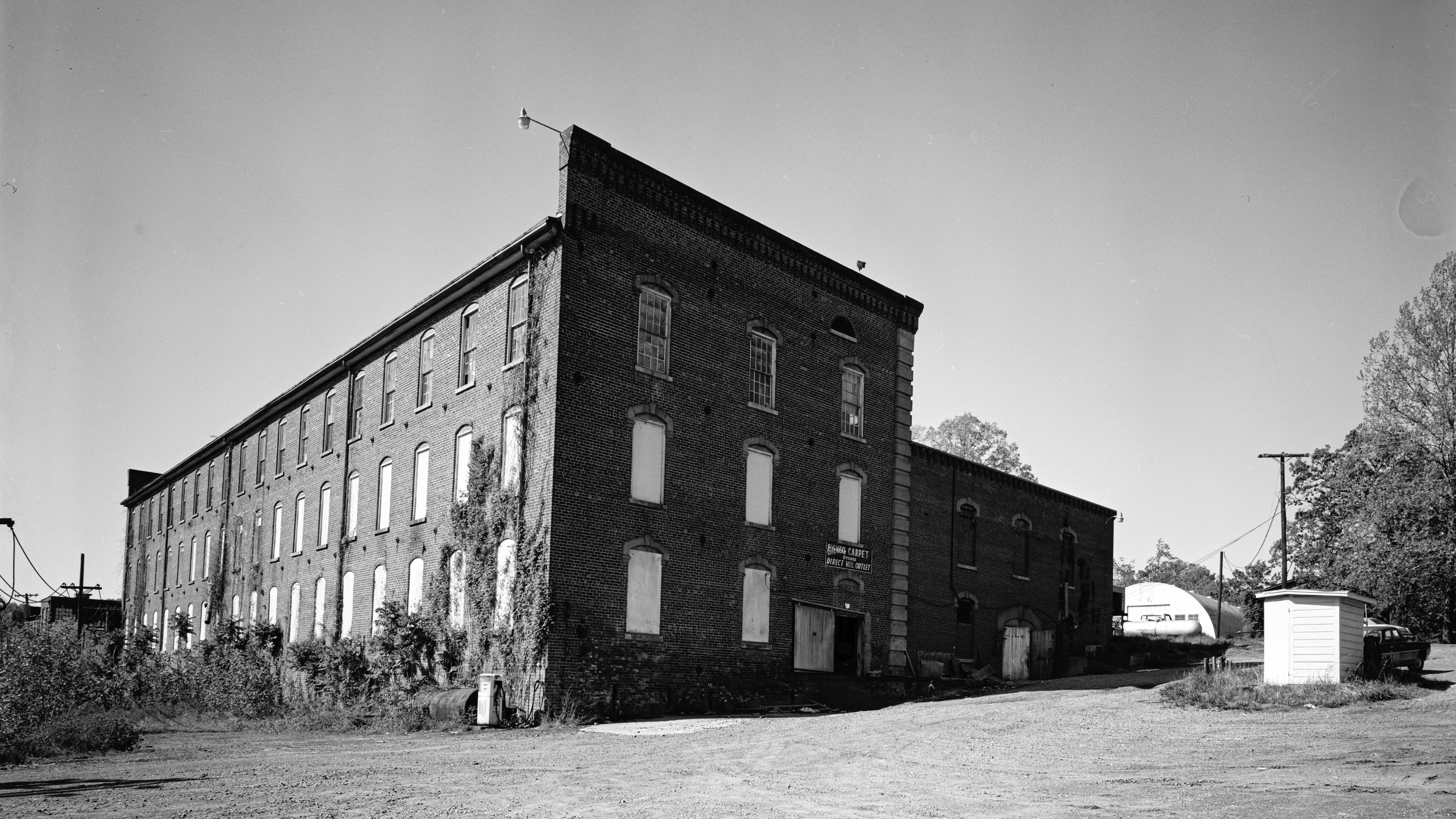
The historic cotton mill in Glencoe, North Carolina

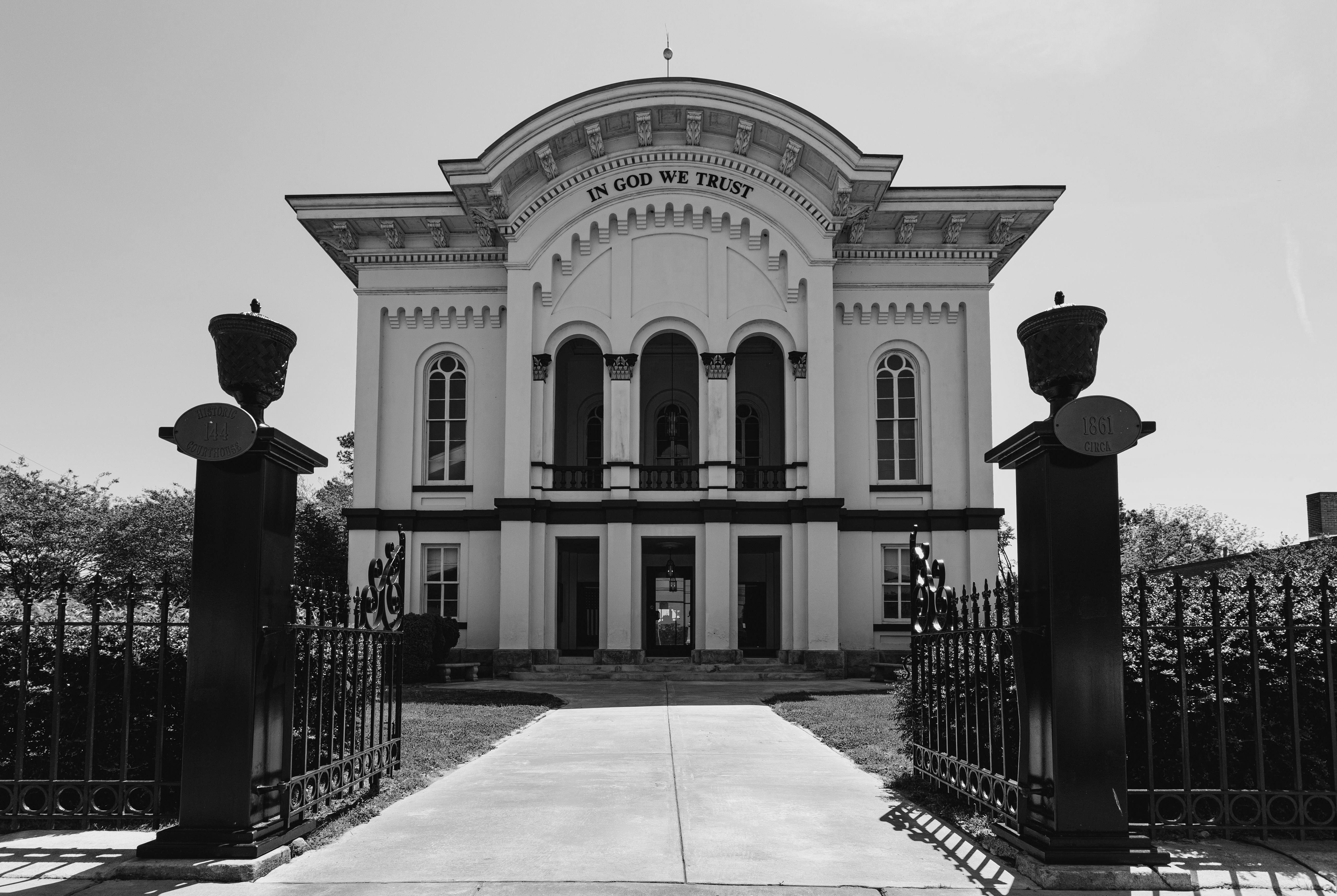
Caswell County Courthouse in Yanceyville, North Carolina

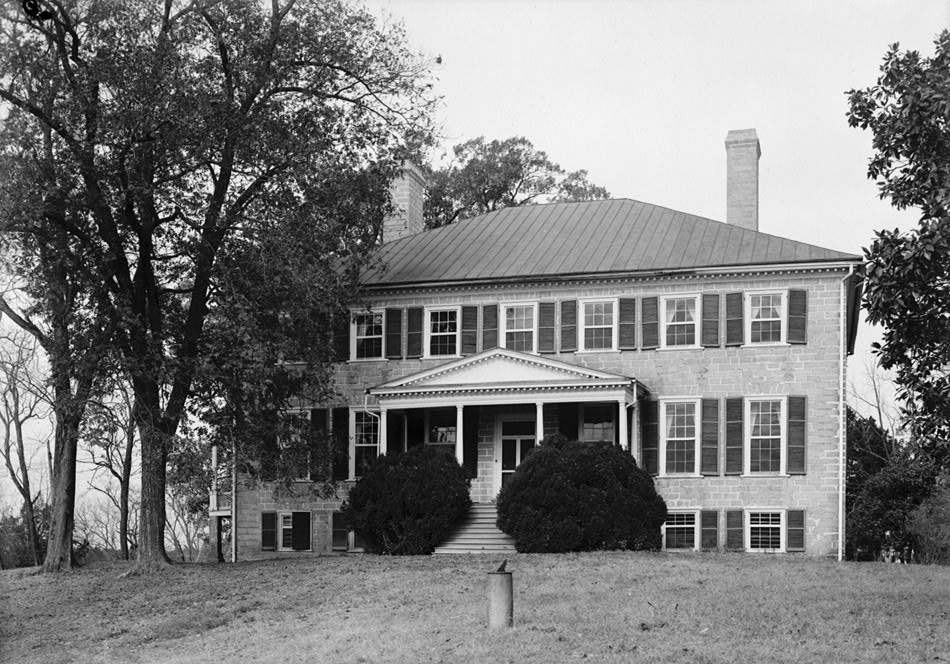
Prestwould plantation in Clarksville, Virginia

=== McCarthy on set ===
McCarthy was present on set for the duration of shooting and became involved with many facets of production. Pearce estimated that he and McCarthy met with more than 1,000 people throughout the process. McCarthy endeared himself to the cast and crew with his humorous impromptu storytelling. Dourif recalled the author's fascinated appreciation for the particularities of local dialect:

I guess there's something about the way characters use language. You know, Dickens always defined his characters so well with language. And I'm just remembering what a kick it was. We were out looking at locations, and this old guy was showing us around and he'd say: "Well, y'know, th'other day... went over, got in m'car, so t'speak... turned on the engine, so t'speak..." And I remember McCarthy's delight at that. He was describing it to somebody, saying: "My God—this guy was talking about things that'd really happened, but he'd always say so to speak as if it were a metaphor, as if it didn't happen!" There it is. There's the writer. How the way this guy used the language was telling you so much about him. So easy to do, so easy to write—but so clear.

However, McCarthy did not much enjoy making The Gardener's Son. While the experience satisfied his curiosity to observe and participate in filmmaking up close, its difficulties clarified his preference for the writer's life. "It's back-breaking work," McCarthy told his local Knoxville newspaper. "On location for 30 days, and the last week we were working 16 to 18 hours a day. You've got to be some kind of weirdo to think that it's fun. But it sure kept my interest up—and writers are basically pretty lazy people." More than three decades later, he had similar recollections for The Wall Street Journal: "Dick Pearce and I made a film in North Carolina about 30 years ago and I thought, 'This is just hell. Who would do this?' Instead, I get up and have a cup of coffee and wander around and read a little bit, sit down and type a few words and look out the window." Asked if there was "something compelling about the collaborative process compared to the solitary job of writing", McCarthy replied: "Yes, it would compel you to avoid it at all costs."

=== Music ===
Charles Gross composed the score. The music is influenced by traditional Appalachian music. Among the instruments heard are banjo, fiddle, Jew's harp, acoustic guitar, and brass, such as a muted trumpet. Aside from the themes heard during the opening and closing credits, the drama makes spare use of background music, reserving it mostly for transitions between scenes. Describing the score as "acid bluegrass", Eli Friedberg of The Film Stage said its sound unmistakably dated the film to the late 1970s, yet at the same time gave the 19th century period piece a timeless feel. As of 2017, Gross's music for The Gardener's Son had not been released as a soundtrack album or other audio media.

== Release and reception ==
=== Broadcast ===
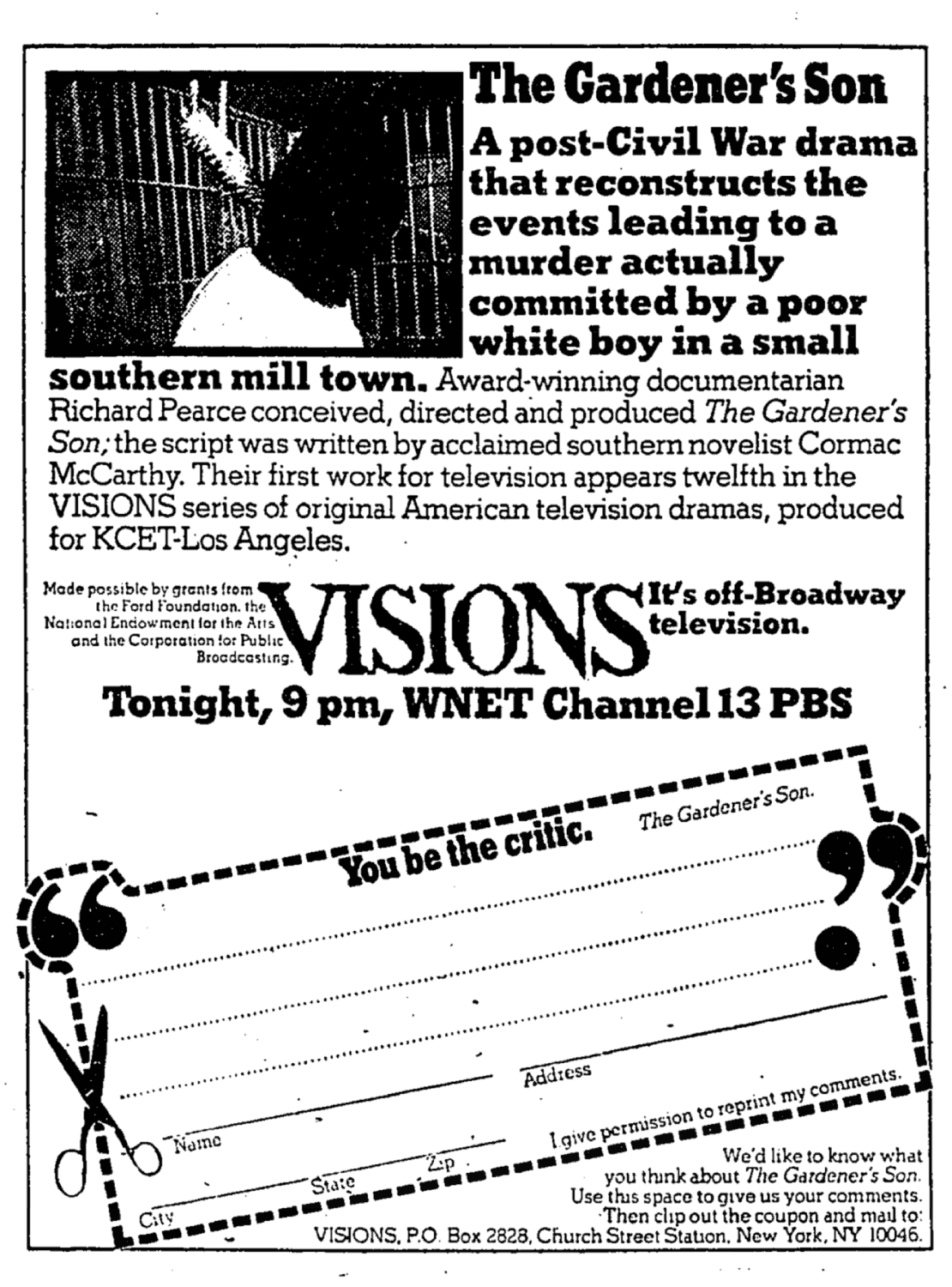
Print ad in the New York Times on January 6, 1977, promoting that night's premiere broadcast of The Gardener's Son on WNET.

The Gardener's Son premiered on PBS stations at 9 p.m. on Thursday, January 6, 1977. Initial reviews were generally enthusiastic. In The New York Times, John J. O'Connor noted the film's unconventional narrative, its historical authenticity, and the passionate quality of Dourif's performance. O'Connor wrote that the film "strays far from the path of standard television. It refuses to be hurried; it fails to tie up loose ends and refuses to send us off to bed secure in the knowledge that everything in this life has a defined beginning, middle and end." Alan M. Kriegsman of The Washington Post hailed The Gardener's Son as the standout from the Visions series to date, writing that the drama "reflect[s] a writer's accurate ear for local vernacular, and a filmmaker's grasp of the revelatory power of imagery," with further praise for the cast and score. In the Winston-Salem, North Carolina paper The Sentinel, Genie Carr highlighted the climactic scene when "16-year-old Martha McEvoy pleads in vain with her older brother Bobby—handcuffed and guarded by a burly deputy sheriff—for understanding of her life, and his own," saying the moment "brings tears in a film that for more than an hour has emphasized the deadly placid surface stretched tightly over controlled feelings". In Carr's reckoning, the storytelling was true to the emotionally repressed realities of life in the old mill town. He applauded the cast, particularly Martin (who he wrote "controls each of her scenes") and O'Sullivan (who "combines the face of a young worker—beautiful but quickly becoming too old and weary—with the depth of a tender, but wise-too-early girl").

At the 29th Primetime Emmy Awards in September 1977, The Gardener's Son received one Emmy Award nomination—recognizing Gene Piotrowsky in the category Graphic Design and Title Sequences—although many sources have erroneously claimed it received two nominations. (Note: According to scholarly sources like Arnold & Luce 1999, p. 5 (citing Pearce 1996, p. vi) and Peebles 2017, p. 40, The Gardener's Son received two Emmy nominations. Pearce's foreword mentions two Emmy nominations, but specifies neither category. Sources published before Pearce's foreword mention only one Emmy: both the Los Angeles Times article announcing the nominees for the 1977 Emmy Awards and the 1989 edition of Variety's Directory of Major U.S. Show Business Awards list only one nomination for The Gardener's Son, for Gene Piotrowsky in graphic design. According to the earlier sources, the Visions series did receive a nomination in the light direction category, but it was for Ken Dettling and Leard Davis for their work on another episode, titled Gold Watch—not for The Gardener's Son.) The Village Voice named it one of the best films of 1977 in a write-up by Tom Allen. He said it was the year's "most provocative unknown American movie", worthy of comparison to The Battle of Algiers (1966), and a fine example of "class-conscious filmmaking, a rarity in this country, that is squeezed for humanistic insights rather than doctrinaire propaganda". Later, in an essay for Film Comment asking if the medium of "telefilm" had experienced its own "Golden Age of TV Drama" yet, Allen cited Pearce as one of the two "most promising" directors working in TV since 1975 (alongside Robert Markowitz), writing that The Gardener's Son and his later TV film Siege (1978) had "demonstrated more of an engaged social conscience wed to a commendable level of craft than any other active filmmaker in America."

Critical response was not unanimously positive. In the Los Angeles Times, the critic James Brown dismissed The Gardener's Son as too dreary and directionless for audiences to connect with its historical themes on its own terms. "McCarthy and Pearce have asked the audience to determine Robert's motivations," Brown said, but he found this was "a less than compelling task" given the drama's reliance on vague symbolism and emotional detachment from its central character. Brown said Dourif "alternately underplays and overstates the role", though he commended much of the rest of the cast, particularly Hardin and O'Sullivan. A reviewer for the North Carolina newspaper The Greensboro Record said the film "contained dialogue gross enough to make an alderman blush, to say nothing of repeated blasphemies of the commoner sort" and objected so strongly offended to its content that he called for its permanent removal from the airwaves, invoking obscenity law via the Communications Act of 1934 and Title 18 of the U.S. Code.

=== Screenings ===
The premiere screening of The Gardener's Son took place at the Hugh M. Cummings High School auditorium in Burlington on December 17, 1976, ahead of its broadcast premiere, with seating by invitation only. More than 400 people attended the screening, including more than 100 people who had played bit parts or appeared as extras. A local journalist reported locals had been "looking forward to [the screening] with mixed feelings of trepidation and pride."

Encouraged by critics' favorable response to the broadcast, McCarthy and Pearce explored the possibility of a limited theatrical release. However, they learned that a theatrical version would be expected to undergo re-editing for a shorter runtime. The format would need to be converted from 16 mm to 35 mm film. Such a process "takes money", as McCarthy noted in a 1981 letter. The film never reached a cinematic release. However, the film did screen out of competition at the Berlin International Film Festival and Edinburgh International Film Festival. Reviewing the film at Edinburgh, The Observer's Russell Davies dubbed it a "nice art-house job" and detected a modern subtext in "the shell-shock-eyed" expression worn by Dourif throughout the historical drama: "Whether or not the derangements of Vietnam were uppermost in the director's mind, they are certainly outermost in Dourif's face."

Through 1978, the film also screened at a San Francisco, California showcase for independent filmmakers; at the Winthrop University in Rock Hill, South Carolina; at the University of South Carolina in the state capital of Columbia; at the Columbia Museum of Art; and for a senior citizens club in Graniteville, where the film takes place. North Carolina newspapers reported that the film would screen at the 30th Cannes Film Festival, but this did not materialize. Years hence, McCarthy scholars have occasionally organized screenings at academic conferences devoted to the author's literature.

=== Cast and crew response ===
Dourif later revealed he felt the film was, despite its merits, fatally flawed by McCarthy's anticlimactic ending: "If he had had a really good resolving third act, he'd have had a movie. It was close." Jerry Hardin, who played the McEvoys' gardening father, had voiced strong disagreements with Pearce during filming about the emotional handling of the plot development and maintained strong feelings about these differences decades later. McCarthy said he felt mostly satisfied with the film but regretted that it had been filmed in color on 16 mm instead of black-and-white on 35 mm film. In Pearce's foreword to the published screenplay, he called The Gardener's Son "my education as a filmmaker" and said McCarthy had become a godfather to his daughter and, "in many ways, to all the films I've made since."

== Screenplay publication ==
In September 1996, Ecco Press published a hardcover edition of McCarthy's screenplay, with a foreword by Pearce. It was reprinted in its first trade paperback edition in 2014. There are lines and scenes in the screenplay as published that were cut from the film. The differences between the screenplay and film have been described in an article by Dianne C. Luce. The published screenplay differs yet again from the final shooting script, stored in Pearce's archives, and its differences have also been evaluated by Luce. The screenplay's publication prompted little critical attention. A review in Booklist called it "lesser in scope and impact than his All the Pretty Horses (1992) or The Crossing (1994) but bearing in full measure his gift—that ability to fit complex and universal emotions into ordinary lives and still preserve all of their power and significance."

== Home video ==
But the story of The Gardener's Son and McCarthy's mark on the [Glencoe] village has been buried over time. Filming locations have been demolished, remodeled, rebuilt, or fallen into disrepair. Even the film, itself, is impossible to find online or in stores.

— Times-News, "'The Gardener's Son' 40 years later" (January 2017)

The Gardener's Son remained unavailable on home video formats for many years. It is generally considered out of print. Because video copies have been scarce and generally unavailable, the published text of the screenplay is typically read in isolation as a closet drama. In 2008, the scholar John Cant wrote:

The Gardener's Son ought to be evaluated and analyzed as a television film. This was the form in which it was conceived and indeed brought into being. ... In order to perform this critical task adequately it would be necessary to have access to repeated viewings of the film itself, but this is not possible. A video does exist but copyright conditions are such that it is not available, even to academics.

Direct Cinema Limited, a company based in Santa Monica, California, released the film on DVD in 2010. Unofficial uploads of the complete film have circulated online.

== Legacy ==
The screenplay suggests that while records and artifacts may embody the distorted views of their creators, they are nonetheless the fragments out of which we may apprehend the past if we read them closely, sympathetically, and in context.

— Dianne C. Luce, in Myth, Legend, Dust: Critical Responses to Cormac McCarthy (2010)

McCarthy scholars distinguish McCarthy's screenplay and Pearce's film as distinct works to be evaluated separately. The Southern author Robert Morgan saw the film the night it premiered on PBS and was inspired by its social realism and close attention to regional dialect. "In typical McCarthy style," Richard B. Woodward wrote in his 1992 profile of the author, "the amputation of the boy's leg and his slow execution by hanging are the moments from the show that linger in the mind." Peter Josyph praised the acting and cinematography but found McCarthy's writing below the standard of his finest works, though he also described the screenplay as "certainly sympathetic to the screen", concluding that it was certainly "better than most of the crap that was made at the time."

By 2020, Lee Clark Mitchell claimed the film version "now sustains interest solely for being the first of McCarthy's ventures into cinematic writing." The Gardener's Son represented a noteworthy turning point in McCarthy's development as a writer not only as his first attempt at screenwriting, but also as his first rigorously researched work of historical fiction, anticipating his Western novel Blood Meridian (1985) in this respect. Blood Meridian is noted for its remarkable historical authenticity and rich detail drawing from various fields of knowledge. Luce said that Blood Meridian initially seemed like a radical stylistic break for McCarthy, but The Gardener's Son shows it had precedent. For Luce, both works are "everywhere informed by McCarthy's mastery of the history, geology, botany, cultural anthropology, language—all the physical and human textures" of their respective regions.

McCarthy would go on to write several more screenplays, most unpublished, and several of his novels have been adapted into films by others. (Note: McCarthy's three unpublished screenplays are two drafts that, over time, became the novels Cities of the Plain (1998) and No Country for Old Men (2005), plus an abandoned drama titled Whales and Men. Manuscripts of these unpublished screenplays are held with the archive of McCarthy's papers at the Wittliff Collections. Though No Country for Old Men was adapted into a film in 2007, its screenplay was written by the Coen brothers and is unrelated to McCarthy's early draft version.) Decades after The Gardener's Son, McCarthy got a second original screenplay made into a motion picture with The Counselor (2013), directed by Ridley Scott. In addition to writing the screenplay, McCarthy took a hands-on role in development of The Counselor just as he had on The Gardener's Son, this time as an executive producer, weighing in during pre-production, casting, filming, and editing.

McCarthy received sole official credit on the screenplay, but the background research undertaken in the writing The Gardener's Son was a collaborative effort between McCarthy and Pearce, and to an extent Pearce can be considered as a coauthor or at least influence. Rick Wallach regarded Pearce, not McCarthy, as "the real author" of the film in terms of vision and ultimate artistic responsibility, a position aligned with the tenets of auteur theory. Writing in an unfamiliar medium, McCarthy restrained some of the more challenging avant-garde tendencies of his prose style. Mitchell claimed McCarthy "reined in the pyrotechnics, perhaps uncertain about the ways in which experimental techniques might alter visual possibilities as thoroughly as his lexical experiments were already recasting late modernist expectations," adding that "nothing [in The Gardener's Son] suggests the surreal, contorted vision evoked by his novels." On the other hand, Luce judged the screenplay "in every way consistent with McCarthy's treatments of characters, theme and the spoken language in his novels," even as its interpretation of historical events demonstrates Pearce's input and approval.

Both Pearce's and McCarthy's research materials can be found in archives held by university libraries. McCarthy's research materials, rough drafts, and correspondence related to The Gardener's Son have been held by the Wittliff Collections at the Alkek Library of Texas State University in San Marcos, Texas since December 2007. Pearce's original shooting script and research newsletters are held at the University of South Carolina Libraries.

== Sources ==
- Anon. (January 1, 1977). "Glencoe Film Premieres on TV". The Daily Times-News. 89 (162). Burlington, North Carolina: Times-News Publishing Co: 10 – via NewspaperArchive. (subscription required) This article incorporates text from this source, which is in the public domain.
- Anon. (January 1, 1977). "Tending to Details of 'Visions' Drama". The Sentinel Funtime. The Sentinel. No. 209. Winston-Salem, North Carolina: Piedmont Publishing Company, Inc. pp. 1, 20 – via Newspapers.com. (subscription required)
- Anon. (January 1, 1977). "Showings Set for 'The Gardener's Son': PBS Film Made in North Carolina". The Landmark: Leisure Time Magazine Section Dedicated to the Good Life. Statesville Record & Landmark. Vol. 103, no. 1. Statesville, North Carolina: Statesville Daily Record, Inc. Front page, back page – via NewspaperArchive. (subscription required) This article incorporates text from this source, which is in the public domain.
- Anon. (January 2, 1977). "Gardner's [sic] Son, on PBS This Week, Written by Louisvillian". Knoxville News-Sentinel. No. 27, 916. Tennessee: The Knoxville News-Sentinel Company. p. G-7. Archived from the original on August 23, 2023.
- Anon. (January 6, 1977). "Professors Have Roles in Film". The Durham Sun. Vol. 88, no. 264. North Carolina: The Durham Herald Co., Inc. p. 6-C – via Newspapers.com. (subscription required)
- Anon. (January 26, 1977). "'Gardener's Son' Going to Cannes". The Chapel Hill Newspaper. Vol. 55, no. 22. North Carolina: Chapel Hill Publishing Company, Inc. p. 6A – via Newspapers.com. (subscription required)
- Allen, Tom (January 16, 1978). "Film: The Gardener's Son". The Village Voice. New York. p. 45.
- ——— (July–August 1979). "The Semi-Precious Age of TV Movies". Film Comment. 15 (4). New York: Film at Lincoln Center: 21–23, 80. ProQuest 210264743.
- Arnold, Edwin T.; Luce, Dianne C. (1999). "Introduction". In Arnold, Edwin T.; Luce, Dianne C. (eds.). Perspectives on Cormac McCarthy. Jackson: University Press of Mississippi. ISBN 1-57806-104-0 – via the Internet Archive.
- Benarde, Scott (February 13, 1978). "S.C. hanging 100 years ago inspires film". Evening Herald. Vol. 101, no. 36. Rock Hill, South Carolina: Herald Publishing Company. p. 11 – via Newspapers.com.
- Blanchard, Joan (March 23, 1976a). "Glencoe Comes Alive for 'Vision' Movie". The Daily Times-News. 88 (243). Burlington, North Carolina: Times-News Publishing Co: 1B – via NewspaperArchive. (subscription required) This article incorporates text from this source, which is in the public domain.
- ——— (December 14, 1976b). "'Glencoe' Movie Premieres Friday". The Daily Times-News. 89 (144). Burlington, North Carolina: Times-News Publishing Co: 9A – via Newspapers.com. (subscription required)
- ——— (December 19, 1976c). "PBS 'Visions' Movie Premieres in Burlington". The Daily Times-News. 89 (149). Burlington, North Carolina: Times-News Publishing Co: 6D – via NewspaperArchive. (subscription required) This article incorporates text from this source, which is in the public domain.
- Brown, James (January 6, 1977). "'Gardener's Son' on Channel 28". Part IV. Los Angeles Times. p. 18 – via Newspapers.com. (subscription required)
- Cant, John (2008). "Chapter 10: The Gardener's Son". Cormac McCarthy and the Myth of American Exceptionalism. New York: Routledge. pp. 136–153. doi:10.4324/9780203036310-16. ISBN 978-0-415-98142-2. OL 12099599W – via the Internet Archive. (registration required)
- Carr, Genie (January 5, 1977). "A Tale in the Mill's Shadow". The Sentinel. No. 212. Winston-Salem, North Carolina: Piedmont Publishing Company, Inc. p. 36 – via Newspapers.com. (subscription required)
- Carr, Howard (May 2, 1976). "Made-for-TV Movie: Hanging in Yanceyville". Winston-Salem Journal. Vol. 80, no. 30. Winston-Salem, North Carolina: Piedmont Publishing Company. pp. A1, A15 – via Newspapers.com. (subscription required)
- Cook, Bruce (October 1976). "The Writer Unblocked". American Film: Journal of the Film and Television Arts. Vol. 2, no. 1. Washington, D.C.: American Film Institute. pp. 26–30 – via the Internet Archive.
- Crews, Michael Lynn (2017). Books Are Made Out of Books: A Guide to Cormac McCarthy's Literary Influences. Austin: University of Texas Press. doi:10.7560/313480. ISBN 978-1-4773-1469-2.
- David, Nina (1978). "568 – The Gardener's Son". TV Season 76–77. Phoenix, Arizona: Oryx Press. p. 98. ISBN 0-912700-22-X. OL 7088679W – via the Internet Archive.
- Davies, Russell (September 4, 1977). "Laughter in the dark". The Observer. London. p. 26 – via Newspapers.com. (subscription required)
- Friedberg, Eli (June 28, 2023). "Cormac McCarthy on Screen: Revisiting the Film Adaptations of the Great American Novelist". The Film Stage. Archived from the original on June 28, 2023.
- Frye, Steven, ed. (2020). "Chronology". Cormac McCarthy in Context. Cambridge University Press. pp. xvii–xxiv. doi:10.1017/9781108772297.001. ISBN 978-1-108-48883-9. S2CID 241828060.
- ——— (October 27, 2022). "Cormac McCarthy". Oxford Bibliographies Online. Oxford University Press. doi:10.1093/OBO/9780199827251-0122. ISBN 978-0-19-982725-1.
- Gardner, Mary; Gardner, Russell (March 18, 1977). "Publick Knowledge". The Daily Tar Heel. Vol. 84, no. 114. Chapel Hill: University of North Carolina Media Board. p. 2 – via Newspapers.com. (subscription required)
- Greve, Julius; Wierschem, Markus (2017). "Rugged Resonances: From Music in McCarthy to McCarthian Music". European Journal of American Studies. 12 (3). European Association for American Studies: 1–25. doi:10.4000/ejas.12330. ISSN 1991-9336.
- Hoffert, Barbara (July 1, 2014). "The Gardener's Son". Library Journal. 139 (12): 54. EBSCOhost 96885618.
- Jagernauth, Kevin (August 15, 2013). "Before You See 'The Counselor': Watch 1977 Film 'The Gardener's Son,' Cormac McCarthy's First Produced Script". IndieWire. New York: Penske Media Corporation. Archived from the original on May 28, 2023.
- Jillett, Louise, ed. (2016). Cormac McCarthy's Borders and Landscapes (PDF). New York: Bloomsbury Academic. doi:10.5040/9781501319136. ISBN 978-1-5013-1914-3.
- Josyph, Peter (2010). Adventures in Reading Cormac McCarthy. Lanham, Maryland: Scarecrow Press. ISBN 978-0-8108-7708-5.
- Jurgensen, John (November 13, 2009). "Hollywood's Favorite Cowboy". The Wall Street Journal. New York. ProQuest 399070032.
- Kaplan, Mike, ed. (1989). "(E-1292)". Variety's Directory of Major U.S. Show Business Awards. New York: R. R. Bowker. p. 196. ISBN 0-8352-2666-2. LCCN 84018734. OL 2633177W – via the Internet Archive.
- Krafft, Rebecca, ed. (Fall 1991). "Visions". The Arts on Television, 1976–1990: Fifteen Years of Cultural Programming. Washington, D.C.: Media Arts: Film/Radio Television Program, National Endowment for the Arts. pp. 100–104. ISBN 978-0-16-035926-2 – via Google Books. This article incorporates text from this source, which is in the public domain.
- Kriegsman, Alan M. (January 16, 1977). "Public TV's 'Visions' of Expanded Dramatic and Creative Horizons". The Washington Post. Archived from the original on August 13, 2023.
- Leland, Gerry (January 2, 1977). "TV Show Exhumes Forgotten Murder". Section F: Entertainment. The Charlotte Observer. Vol. 91, no. 254. North Carolina: The Knight Publishing Company. pp. 1F–2F – via Newspapers.com. (subscription required)
- Lester, Will (February 20, 1978). "Film Maker Here: 'Oscar' for Effort". Columbia Record. Vol. 80, no. 258. Columbia, South Carolina: Columbia Newspapers, Inc. p. 1-C – via Newspapers.com.
- Lougee, George (January 3, 1977). "'The Gardener's Son' – Orange High Sophomore Appearing on National TV". Section B: Local, State, National and Classified. Durham Morning Herald. Vol. LXXXIII, no. 102. North Carolina: The Durham Herald Co., Inc. p. 1B – via Newspapers.com. (subscription required)
- Luce, Dianne C. (1999). "Cormac McCarthy's First Screenplay: The Gardener's Son". In Arnold, Edwin T.; Luce, Dianne C. (eds.). Perspectives on Cormac McCarthy. Jackson: University Press of Mississippi. pp. 71–96. ISBN 1-57806-104-0 – via the Internet Archive.
- ——— (2000). "'They ain't the thing': Artifact and Hallucinated Recollection in Cormac McCarthy's Early Frame Works". In Wallach, Rick (ed.). Myth, Legend, Dust: Critical Responses to Cormac McCarthy. Manchester, England: Manchester University Press. pp. 23–36. ISBN 0-7190-5948-8 – via Google Books.
- Luce, Dianne C.; Turpin, Zachary (October 1, 2022). "Cormac McCarthy's Interviews in Tennessee and Kentucky, 1968–1980". The Cormac McCarthy Journal. 20 (2). University Park: Penn State University Press: 108–135. doi:10.5325/cormmccaj.20.2.0108. Archived from the original on October 1, 2022. (subscription required)
- Malone, E. T. Jr. (December 18, 1976). "Carolina Mill Town Past Is Recaptured Vividly in 'The Gardener's Son'". Regional News. The Durham Sun. Vol. 88, no. 249. North Carolina: The Durham Herald Co., Inc. p. 20 – via Newspapers.com. (subscription required)
- Margulies, Lee (August 4, 1977). "'Roots' Tops Nominations at Emmy Rerun". View – Part IV. The Los Angeles Times. Vol. XCVI, no. 244. Los Angeles: Times Mirror Company. pp. 1, 15–16 – via Newspapers.com. (subscription required)
- Mitchell, Lee Clark (2020). "Cinematic Adaptations". In Frye, Steven (ed.). Cormac McCarthy in Context. Cambridge University Press. pp. 248–258. doi:10.1017/9781108772297.024. ISBN 978-1-108-48883-9. S2CID 242548430.
- Newton, David (December 19, 1976). "Alamance Folk View Own Film". Greensboro Daily News. North Carolina: Greensboro News Company. pp. C-1, C-6 – via Newspapers.com. (subscription required)
- O'Connor, John J. (January 6, 1977). "TV: WNET Showing Haunting 'Gardener's Son'". The New York Times. Vol. CXXVI, no. 43, 447. p. 59. Archived from the original on August 2, 2023.
- Pearce, Richard (1996). Foreword. The Gardener's Son: A Screenplay. By McCarthy, Cormac. Hopewell, New Jersey: Ecco Press. pp. v–vi. ISBN 0-88001-481-4.
- Peebles, Stacey (2017). Cormac McCarthy and Performance: Page, Stage, Screen. Austin: University of Texas Press. doi:10.7560/312049. ISBN 978-1-4773-1205-6. JSTOR 10.7560/312049.
- Smothers, Bonnie (September 15, 1996). "Adult books: Nonfiction". Booklist. 93 (2). Chicago: American Library Association: 200. Gale A18714926.
- Snider, William D., ed. (January 11, 1977). "Muggeridge and muck". The Greensboro Record. Greensboro, North Carolina: Greensboro News Company. p. A14 – via Newspapers.com. (subscription required)
- Stanley, John (May 8, 1977). "A Showcase to Test New or Unfinished Films". Datebook. Sunday Examiner & Chronicle. Vol. 1977, no. 19. San Francisco: Hearst Newspapers. p. 25 – via Newspapers.com. (subscription required)
- Terrell, Bob (December 26, 1976). "Merry Christmas in the Barnyard". Section D: Features / Editorials. Asheville Citizen-Times. Vol. 107, no. 361. Asheville, North Carolina: Multimedia, Inc. p. 3-D – via Newspapers.com. (subscription required)
- Vieth, Ronja (September 2012). "Cormac McCarthy's Critical Reception". In Cremean, David (ed.). Critical Insights: Cormac McCarthy. Hackensack, New Jersey: Salem Press. pp. 29–49. ISBN 978-1-4298-3725-5. EBSCOhost 83406706.
- Williams, Jessica (January 22, 2017). "'The Gardener's Son' 40 years later". Times-News. Burlington, North Carolina: New Media Investment Group. Archived from the original on August 6, 2017.
- Woodward, Richard B. (April 19, 1992). "Cormac McCarthy's Venomous Fiction". The New York Times. Archived from the original on April 16, 2023. (subscription required)

== Further listening ==
- Yarbrough, Scott; Peebles, Stacey (August 6, 2021). "The Gardener's Son with Stacey Peebles". Reading McCarthy (Podcast). No. 15 – via Buzzsprout.
