= The Gardener's Son (screenplay) =

1996 screenplay written by Cormac McCarthy

The Gardener's Son: A Screenplay
- First edition hardcover
- Author: Cormac McCarthy
- Cover artist: Michael Ian Kaye
- Language: English
- Genre: Drama
- Publisher: Ecco Press
- Publication date: September 1996
- Publication place: United States
- Media type: Print (hardcover)
- Pages: 93
- ISBN: 0-88001-481-4
- Dewey Decimal: 791.43/72
- LC Class: PN1997 .G3194 1996

The Gardener's Son: A Screenplay is the print screenplay for the 1977 television film of the same name, written by Cormac McCarthy. The book was first published in September 1996 by Ecco Press. Based on an 1876 murder case in the mill town of Graniteville, South Carolina, the story follows Robert McEvoy—an embittered young man whose father works as a gardener for the mill-owning Gregg family—as a chain of events lead to his killing of James Gregg and an ensuing trial.

The film premiered on PBS stations on January 6, 1977, as the twelfth entry in the anthology series Visions. The published edition of the screenplay differs from the shooting script and the finished film. Although the film was well-reviewed, the screenplay garnered little notice upon its release. Nonetheless, The Gardener's Son is more often read as a closet drama than viewed as a film because of its scarcity on home video. McCarthy scholars generally regard it as a minor work in his bibliography.

== Background ==
In 1974, Richard Pearce reached Cormac McCarthy and asked him to write the screenplay for an episode of Visions, a television drama series. Beginning in early 1975, and armed with only "a few photographs in the footnotes to a 1928 biography of a famous pre-Civil War industrialist William Gregg as inspiration," he and McCarthy spent a year traveling the South in order to research the subject matter. Much of this research and McCarthy's correspondence while writing are currently collected in the Wittliff collections. According to the guide to the collection, The Gardener's Son is his "only title with a subseries devoted to research." McCarthy completed the screenplay in 1976 and the episode was aired on January 6, 1977.

== Plot summary ==
=== Act one ===
William Gregg, the owner of The Graniteville Manufacturing Company and patriarch of the Gregg family, is near death. After a visit by Dr. Perceval, he and Marina Gregg, wife of William, go to see Robert McEvoy, the son of Patrick McEvoy, a worker at the mill who tends the gardens. Robert has a broken leg due to an accident which may have been the fault of James Gregg, William’s son. Robert is convinced by Mrs. Gregg to have surgery to remove the leg.

When William Gregg passes away, James takes over the mill and is not as sympathetic to his workers and leaves many of them unemployed without remorse. Robert's hatred for the mill and James continues to grow while he is recovering and he wishes to return to the farm his family once owned. He leaves Graniteville as an act of rebellion against James and the changes he has made to the mill.

=== Act two ===
Two years later, Robert returns after hearing word of his mother's illness but he is too late and finds her being buried on the same property as the mill. This angers him because as he says, "She don't belong to the mill." He goes on to find the mill even worse than he left it. His father has been assigned to work in a factory, leaving the once beautiful gardens to turn to weeds. Robert is angry at the capitalist behavior of James and the awful treatment of the workers. While searching for his father in order to discuss the burial of Mrs. McEvoy, he happens upon James in the mill's offices. After a heated conversation, he shoots and kills Gregg. At once, the factory goes silent, "as if Robert has shot the factory itself, the very system, in the abdomen, bringing capitalism's exploitation of its workers to a temporary halt." Many citizens believe Robert's actions to be because of James’s rumored bribe and seduction of Robert’s sister, Martha, when they were younger, though she claims that he is not aware of the incident. Nobody is ever able to determine Robert's motives and he is unable to speak in order to defend himself or expose the true character of James. Robert remains this way and continues to be an outsider to the community until he is hanged as a punishment for his crime.

== Characters ==
=== Greggs ===
- William Gregg, owner of the cotton mill and head of the Gregg family. He is known for his compassion and concern for his workers' well-being.
- James Gregg, son of William Gregg. He is not as caring as his father and grows into a ruthless owner of the mill.
- Marina Gregg, wife of William Gregg.

=== McEvoys ===
- Patrick McEvoy, father of the McEvoys. He tends the gardens of the mill until James gains control and forces him to abandon them and work in a factory line. His acceptance of this without any fight is disheartening to Robert.
- Robert McEvoy, son of Patrick McEvoy. While recovering from his leg injury, his hatred for the cotton mill and James Gregg grows until he becomes angry enough to leave Graniteville. When he returns to find what James has done to the mill and the town, he is overwhelmed and lashes out at James.
- Martha McEvoy, sister of Robert and daughter of Patrick McEvoy. She is rumored to have been bribed and seduced by James.

== Themes ==
Like many other McCarthy's other works, The Gardener's Son highlights the violence and ugliness that can be exposed in people. Also, Robert McEvoy is misunderstood and spends a large portion of the movie without one or both of his parents in his life, much like other protagonists in McCarthy's works. J. Douglas Canfield wrote in support of the presence of an Oedipus complex in Robert McEvoy. He sees James's relationship to Robert and vice versa as "a twin brother of sorts, for they are sons of twinned patriarchs." Robert's return to Graniteville and his attempt to right the wrongs of the town show his acceptance as the role of a surrogate patriarch. However, after he eliminates the problem of James and returns to be punished by the very system that he wanted to correct, he loses this role and is left empty and "impotent."

== Publication and reception ==
The Gardener's Son was published in September 1996 by Ecco Press, which had published McCarthy's play The Stonemason the year prior. Ecco published a trade paperback edition in 2014. In a foreword to the book, Pearce wrote:

For Cormac McCarthy, at least from my vantage point, it was a year of pure alchemy, much of it spent translating what could have been a dry academic expose into a strange and haunting tale of impotence, rage, and ultimately violence among two generations of owners and workers, fathers and son, during the rise and fall of one of America's most bizarre utopian industrial experiments.

Ecco's printing of The Gardener's Son elicited scant notice from critics. A review in Booklist called it a "monumental small work for McCarthy, lesser in scope and impact than his All the Pretty Horses (1992) or The Crossing (1994) but bearing in full measure his gift—that ability to fit complex and universal emotions into ordinary lives and still preserve all of their power and significance." In 2010, Niall Griffiths wrote in The Daily Telegraph that "McCarthy's ear for nervous and energetic dialogue is often overshadowed by the heights of his descriptive prose, yet the beauties of his speech can equal those of his narrative," particularly in The Gardener's Son and his other dramas.

== Sources ==
- Arnold, Edwin T.; Luce, Dianne C. (1999). "Introduction". In Arnold, Edwin T.; Luce, Dianne C. (eds.). Perspectives on Cormac McCarthy. Jackson: University Press of Mississippi. ISBN 1-57806-104-0 – via the Internet Archive.
- Canfield, J. Douglas (Spring 2002). "Oedipal Complexities in Cormac McCarthy's The Stonemason and The Gardener's Son" (PDF). The Cormac McCarthy Journal. 2 (1). Miami: The Cormac McCarthy Society: 12–22. JSTOR 42909343. Archived from the original (PDF) on July 15, 2004.
- Frye, Steven (October 27, 2022). "Cormac McCarthy". Oxford Bibliographies Online. Oxford University Press. doi:10.1093/OBO/9780199827251-0122. ISBN 978-0-19-982725-1.
- Griffiths, Niall (May 15, 2010). "A kink in the road: The Sunset Limited: a Novel in Dramatic Form by Cormac McCarthy". Review Magazine. The Daily Telegraph. No. 48, 195 – via Newspapers.com. (subscription required)
- Hoffert, Barbara (July 1, 2014). "The Gardener's Son". Library Journal. 139 (12): 54. EBSCOhost 96885618.
- Mack, Tom (September 10, 2010). "Novelist reimagines Graniteville murder". Aiken Standard. Archived from the original on July 7, 2011.
- Luce, Dianne C. (1999). "Cormac McCarthy's First Screenplay: The Gardener's Son". In Arnold, Edwin T.; Luce, Dianne C. (eds.). Perspectives on Cormac McCarthy. Jackson: University Press of Mississippi. pp. 71–96. ISBN 1-57806-104-0 – via the Internet Archive.
- ——— (2000). "'They ain't the thing': Artifact and Hallucinated Recollection in Cormac McCarthy's Early Frame Works". In Wallach, Rick (ed.). Myth, Legend, Dust: Critical Responses to Cormac McCarthy. Manchester, England: Manchester University Press. pp. 23–36. ISBN 0-7190-5948-8 – via Google Books.
- Luce, Dianne C.; Turpin, Zachary (October 1, 2022). "Cormac McCarthy's Interviews in Tennessee and Kentucky, 1968–1980". The Cormac McCarthy Journal. 20 (2). University Park: Penn State University Press: 108–135. doi:10.5325/cormmccaj.20.2.0108. Archived from the original on October 1, 2022. (subscription required)
- Pearce, Richard (1996). Foreword. The Gardener's Son: A Screenplay. By McCarthy, Cormac. Hopewell, New Jersey: Ecco Press. pp. v–vi. ISBN 0-88001-481-4.
- Peebles, Stacey (2013). "McCarthy and Film". In Frye, Steven (ed.). The Cambridge Companion to Cormac McCarthy. Cambridge University Press. doi:10.1017/CCO9781139087438.020. ISBN 978-1-139-08743-8.
- ——— (2017). "Chapter One. First Forays: Early Film Interest and The Gardener's Son". Cormac McCarthy and Performance: Page, Stage, Screen. Austin: University of Texas Press. pp. 15–40. doi:10.7560/312049-003. ISBN 978-1-4773-1205-6. JSTOR 10.7560/312049.5.
- Smothers, Bonnie (September 15, 1996). "Adult books: Nonfiction". Booklist. 93 (2). Chicago: American Library Association: 200. Gale A18714926.
- Wittliff Collections (n.d.). "A Guide to the Cormac McCarthy Papers" (PDF). txstate.edu. San Marcos: Texas State University. Archived from the original (PDF) on July 20, 2011.
- Vieth, Ronja (September 2012). "Cormac McCarthy's Critical Reception". In Cremean, David (ed.). Critical Insights: Cormac McCarthy. Hackensack, New Jersey: Salem Press. pp. 29–49. ISBN 978-1-4298-3725-5. EBSCOhost 83406706.
