= Perspectives on Cormac McCarthy =

Perspectives on Cormac McCarthy is a 1999 collection of essays critiquing the works of Cormac McCarthy from his first novel, The Orchard Keeper, originally published in 1965, up through Cities of the Plain, published in 1998. Perspectives was edited by Edwin T. Arnold and Diane C Luce. Each editor contributed two essays apiece to the collection of eleven essays. This book covers all of McCarthy's major works published at that time, with the exception of his 1994 drama The Stonemason. Perspectives was published in 1999 by University Press of Mississippi.

== Chapters ==
The contents of Perspectives on Cormac McCarthy is provided below:

"Introduction" by Edwin T. Arnold and Dianne C. Luce (pp. 1–16)

1. "Values and Structure in The Orchard Keeper" by David Paul Ragan (pp. 17–28)
2. "A Thing Against Which Time Will Not Prevail: Pastoral and History in Cormac McCarthy's South" by John M. Grammer (pp. 29–44).
3. "Naming, Knowing and Nothingness: McCarthy's Moral Parables" by Edwin T. Arnold (pp. 45–70).
4. "Cormac McCarthy's First Screenplay: 'The Gardener's Son'" by Dianne C. Luce (pp. 71–96).
5. "The Imprisonment of Sensibility: Suttree" by Thomas D. Young Jr (pp. 97–122).
6. ""What kind of indians was them?": Some Historical Sources in Cormac McCarthy's Blood Meridian" by John Emil Sepich (pp. 123-144).
7. ""The Very Life of the Darkness": A Reading of Blood Meridian" by Steven Shaviro (pp. 145-158).
8. "Gravers False and True: Blood Meridian as Gnostic Tragedy" by Leo Daugherty (pp. 159–174).
9. "John Grady Cole's Expulsion from Paradise" by Gail Moore Morrison (pp. 175–194).
10. "The Road and the Matrix: The World as Tale in The Crossing" by Dianne C. Luce (pp. 195–220).
11. "The Last of the Trilogy: First Thoughts on Cities of the Plain" by Edwin T. Arnold (pp. 221–248).

Notes on Contributors (pp. 249–250).

Index (pp. 251).

== See also ==
- Cormac McCarthy bibliography
- List of awards received by Cormac McCarthy
