= Cormac McCarthy bibliography =

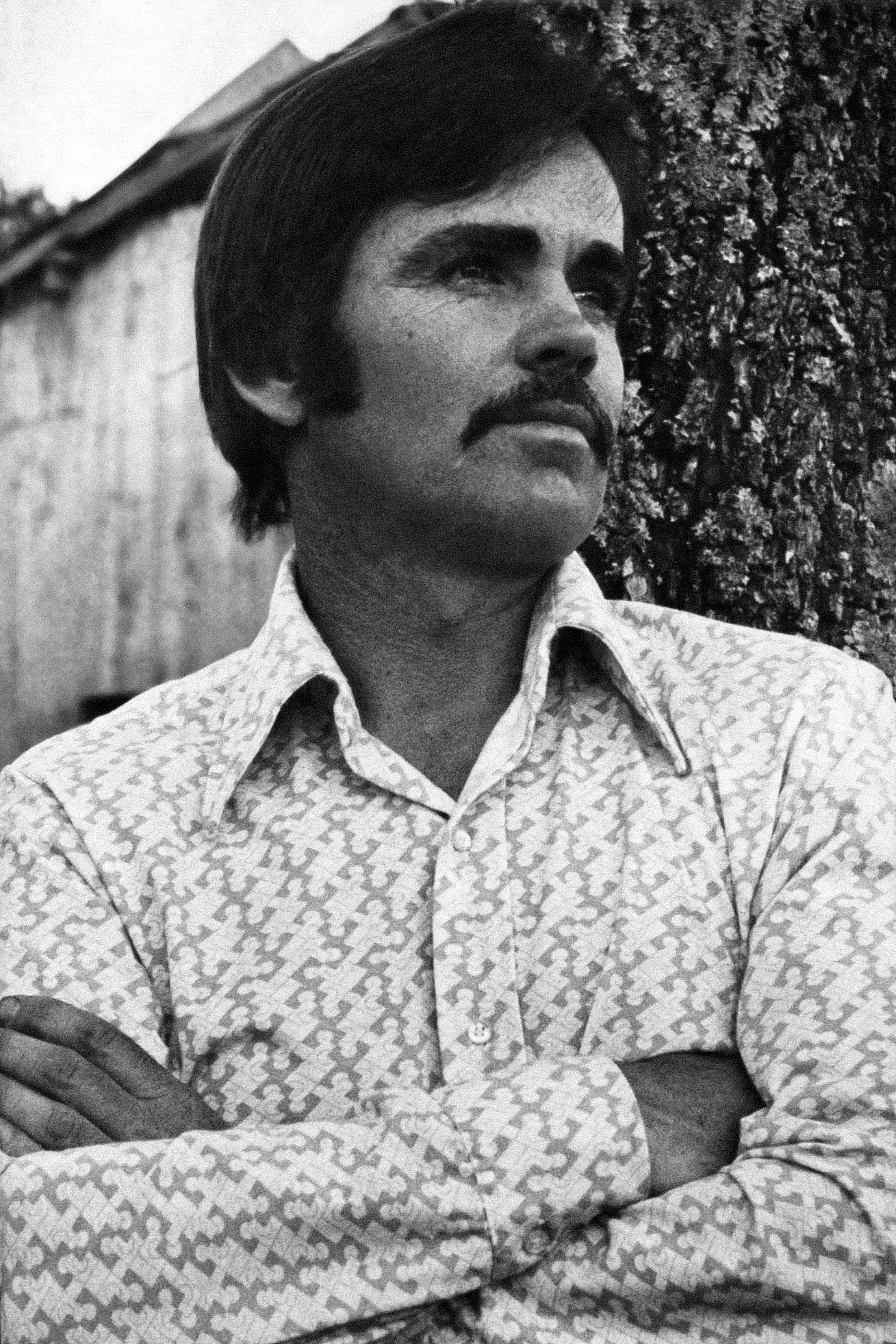
- McCarthy in 1973
- Novels↙: 12
- Stories↙: 3
- Plays↙: 2
- Essays↙: 1

A list of works by or about Cormac McCarthy, the American novelist, playwright, and screenwriter. McCarthy published twelve novels, spanning the Southern Gothic, Western, and post-apocalyptic genres, as well as multiple short-stories, screenplays, plays, and an essay.

In 1985, he published Blood Meridian, which received a lukewarm response. The novel has since gained great esteem and is often seen as his magnum opus — some have even labelled it the Great American Novel.

== Novels ==
| # | Denotes an entry in The Border Trilogy | # | Denotes an entry in The Passenger Series |

| Title | Notes | Publication | ISBN | Ref(s) |
|---|---|---|---|---|
| The Orchard Keeper | | 1965 | ISBN 0-679-72872-4 | |
| Outer Dark | | 1968 | ISBN 0-679-72873-2 | |
| Child of God | | 1973 | ISBN 0-679-72874-0 | |
| Suttree | | 1979 | ISBN 0-679-73632-8 | |
| Blood Meridian; or, The Evening Redness in the West | | 1985 | ISBN 0-679-72875-9 | |
| All the Pretty Horses | Book 1 in the Border Trilogy | 1992 | ISBN 0-679-74439-8 | |
| The Crossing | Book 2 in the Border Trilogy | 1994 | ISBN 0-679-76084-9 | |
| Cities of the Plain | Book 3 in the Border Trilogy | 1998 | ISBN 0-679-74719-2 | |
| No Country for Old Men | | 2005 | ISBN 0-375-70667-4 | |
| The Road | | 2006 | ISBN 0-307-38789-5 | |
| The Passenger | Book 1 in The Passenger Series | 2022 | ISBN 0-307-26899-3 | |
| Stella Maris | Book 2 in The Passenger Series | 2022 | ISBN 0-307-26900-0 | |

First-edition covers of McCarthy's novels

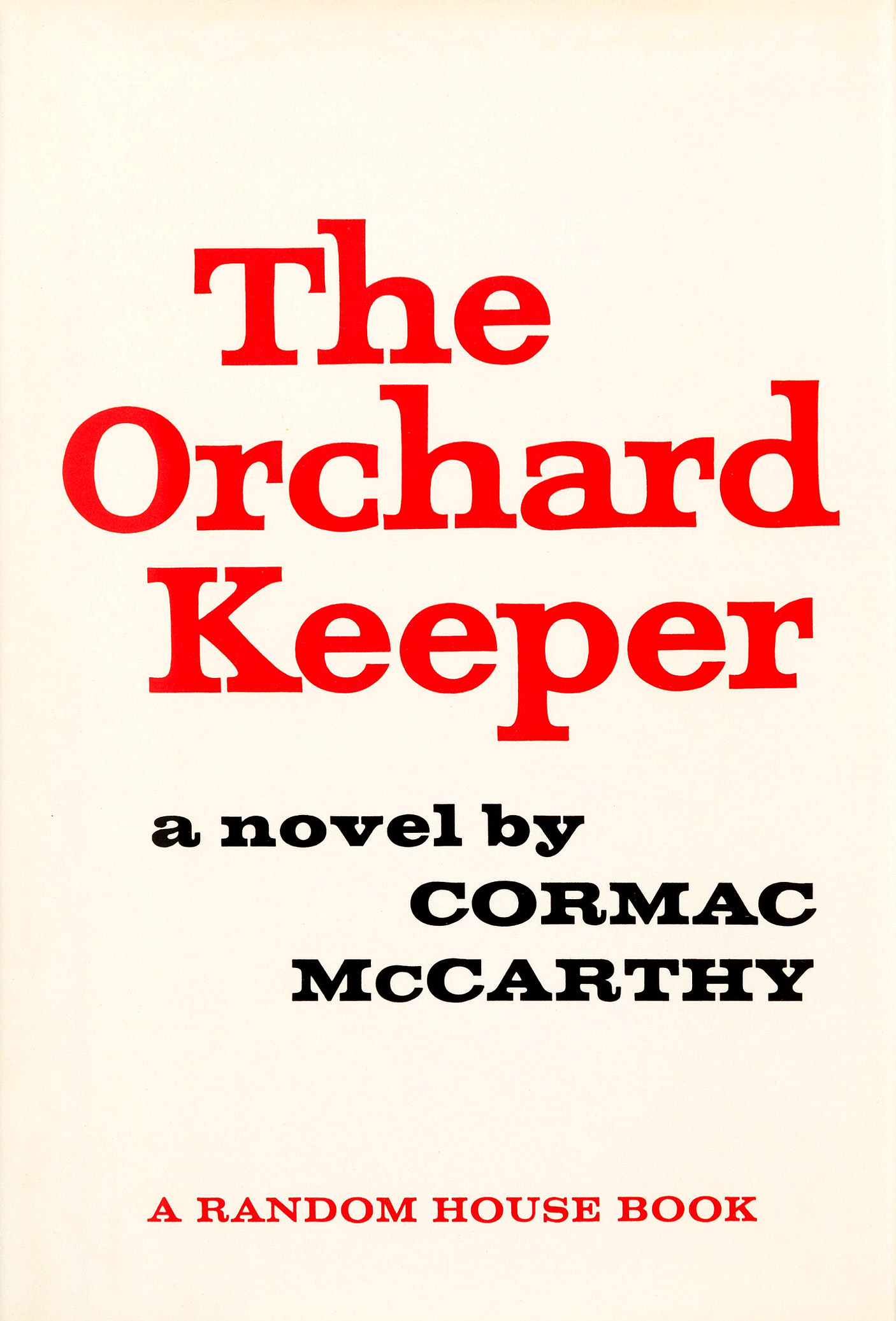
The Orchard Keeper (1965)

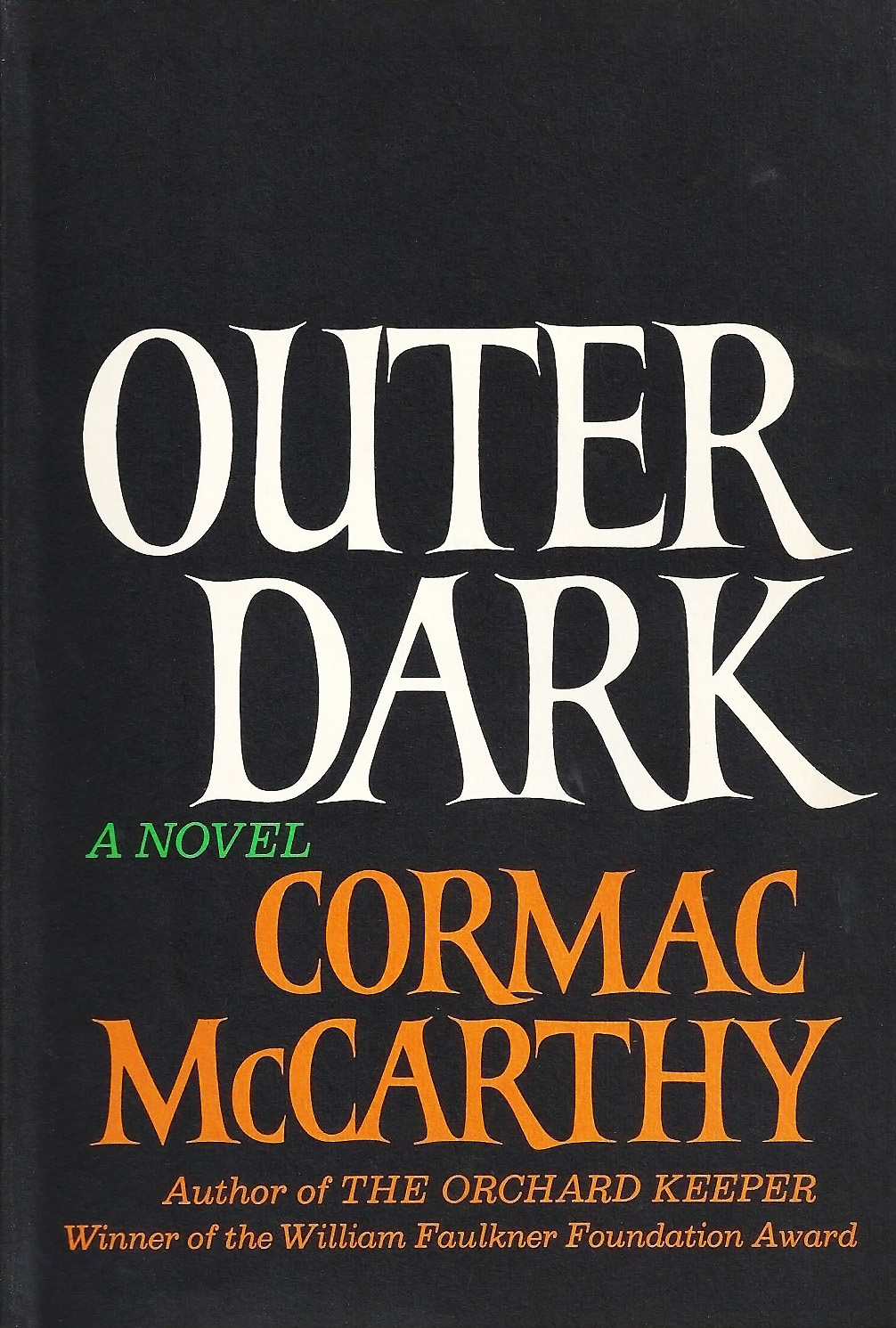
Outer Dark (1968)

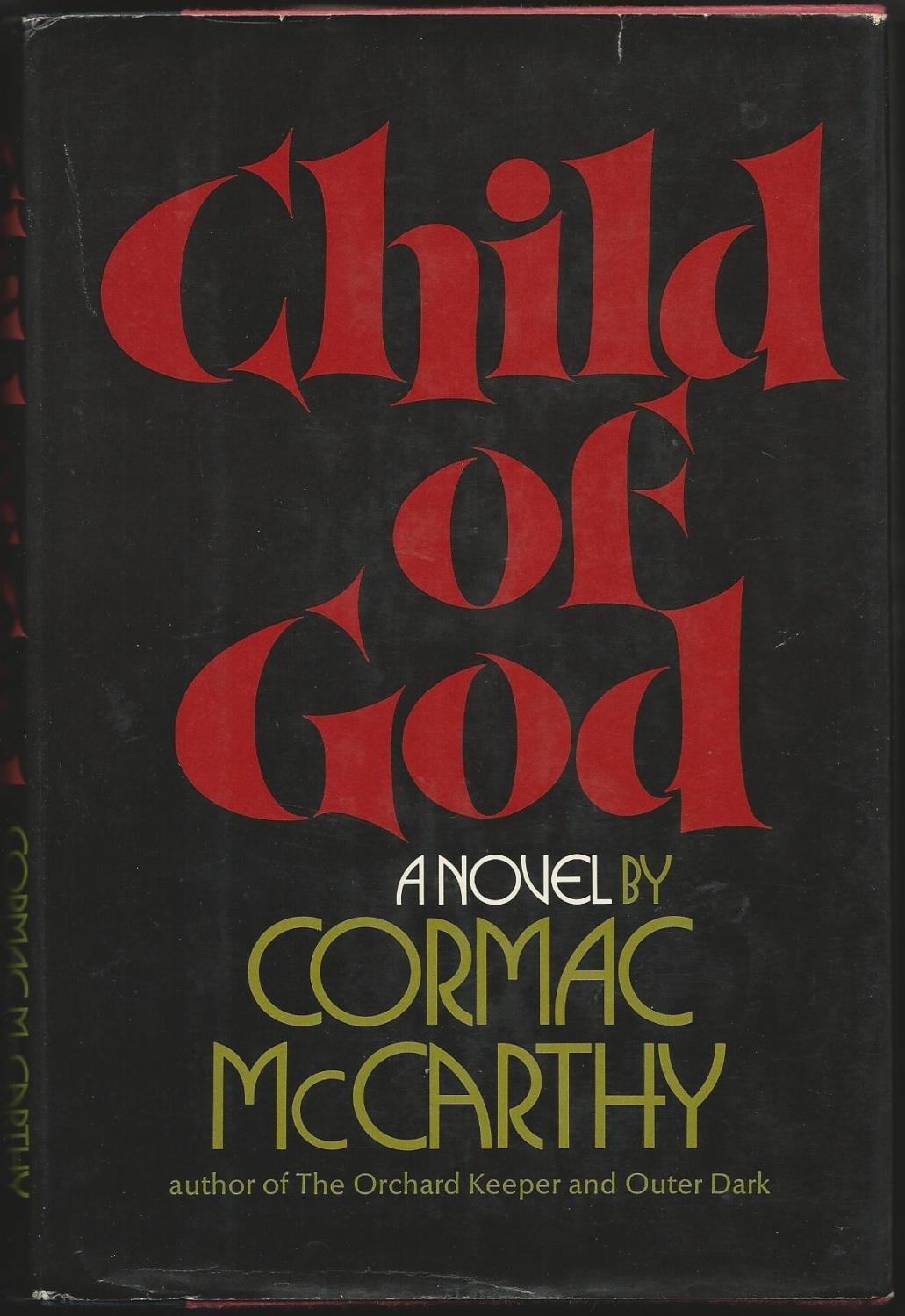
Child of God (1973)

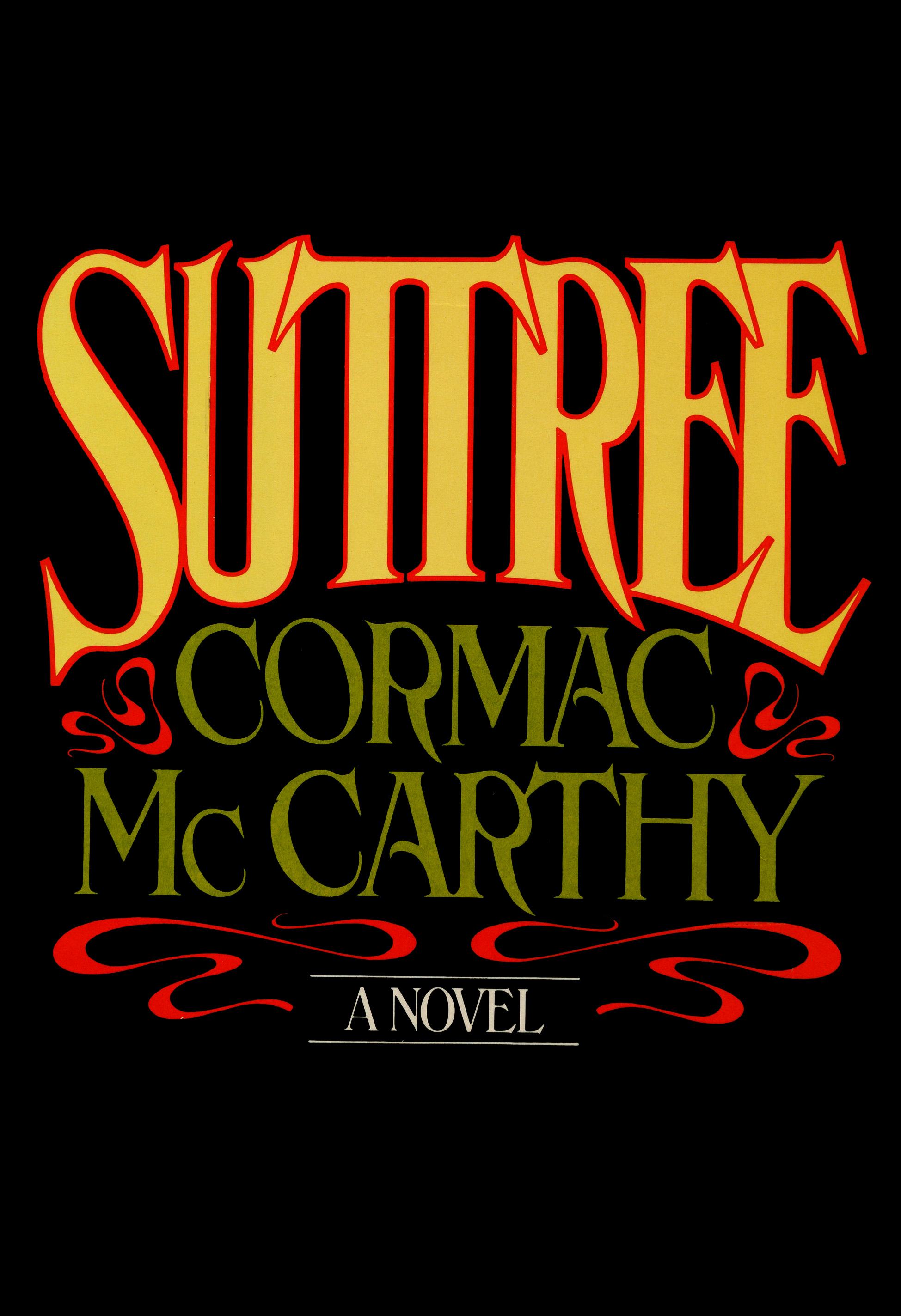
Suttree (1979)

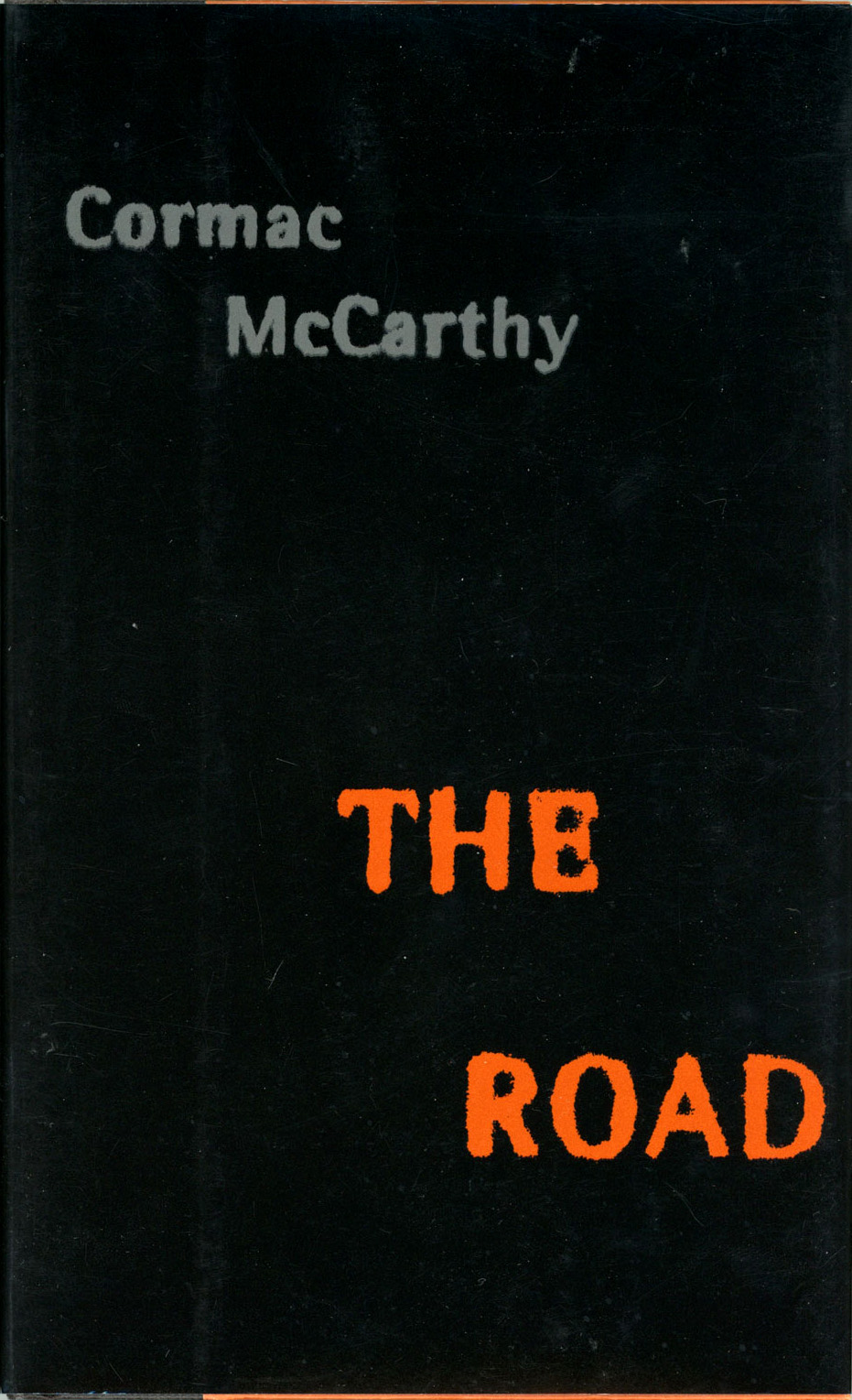
The Road (2006)

== Short fiction ==
| Title | Publication | Notes | Text |
|---|---|---|---|
| "Wake for Susan" | 1959 | | |
| "A Drowning Incident" | 1960 | | |
| "Bounty" | 1965 | | |
| "The Dark Waters" | 1965 | | |

== Essays ==
| Title | Publication | Subject | Notes | Text |
|---|---|---|---|---|
| "The Kekulé Problem" | 2017 | Written for the Santa Fe Institute, it explores the origin of language. | | |

== Screenplays ==
| Title | Publication | ISBN | Link |
|---|---|---|---|
| Cities of the Plain | 1978 (Unpublished) | | |
| Whales and Men | Late 1980s (Unpublished) | | |
| No Country for Old Men | 1987 (Unpublished) | | |
| The Gardener's Son: A Screenplay | 1996 (written in 1976) | ISBN 0-88001-481-4 | |
| The Counselor | 2013 | ISBN 978-1-4472-2764-9 | |

== Plays ==
| Title | Publication | ISBN | Link |
|---|---|---|---|
| The Stonemason | 1995 (Written in late 1980s) | ISBN 978-0-679-76280-5 | |
| The Sunset Limited | 2006 | ISBN 0-307-27836-0 | |

== Dramatic adaptations ==
Released
Television:

- The Gardener's Son (airdate January 1977) was broadcast as part of a series for PBS. McCarthy wrote the screenplay upon request for director Richard Pearce. The screenplay was published as a book in 1996.
- An adaptation of McCarthy's play The Sunset Limited (2006) aired on HBO in February 2011, starring Tommy Lee Jones (who also directed) and Samuel L. Jackson.

Feature films:

- All the Pretty Horses (2000), directed by Billy Bob Thornton, starring Matt Damon and Penélope Cruz. Adapted from McCarthy's 1992 novel.
- No Country for Old Men (2007), Academy Award-winning film directed by the Coen brothers and starring Tommy Lee Jones, Josh Brolin, and Javier Bardem. Adapted from McCarthy's 2005 novel.
- The Road (2009), directed by John Hillcoat and adapted by Joe Penhall. Starring Viggo Mortensen as the father, Kodi Smit-McPhee as the boy, Charlize Theron as the wife, and Robert Duvall as the old man. Adapted from McCarthy's 2006 novel.
- Child of God (2013), co-written and directed by James Franco and premiered at the 70th Venice International Film Festival. Adapted from McCarthy's 1973 novel.

Short films:

- In 2009, Outer Dark was made into a 15-minute short film (directed by Stephen Imwalle) released on the U.S. festival circuit.

Rumored

- A film adaptation of Blood Meridian has been rumored for years; James Franco, John Hillcoat, Todd Field, Scott Rudin, and Ridley Scott have been connected at one point or another to the project, which has fallen through at least twice.

== Critical studies and reviews of McCarthy's work ==
- Williams, Joy (January 2023). "Great, beautiful, terrifying : on Cormac McCarthy". Reviews. Harper's Magazine. Vol. 346, no. 2072. pp. 74–78.

== See also ==
- List of awards received by Cormac McCarthy
