= Carolyn Abbate =

American musicologist

- Born: November 20, 1956 (age 69); New York City, New York, United States

Academic background
- Education: Yale University, Princeton University

Academic work
- Discipline: Musicology
- Institutions: Harvard University, University of California, Berkeley College of Letters and Science, Princeton University

Carolyn Abbate (born November 20, 1956) is an American musicologist, described by the Harvard Gazette as "one of the world’s most accomplished and admired music historians". She is currently Paul and Catherine Buttenwieser University Professor at Harvard University. From her earliest essays she has questioned familiar approaches to well-known works, reaching beyond their printed scores and composer intentions, to explore the particular, physical impact of the medium upon performer and audience alike. Her research focuses primarily on the operatic repertory of the 19th century, offering creative and innovative approaches to understanding these works critically and historically. Some of her more recent work has addressed topics such as film studies and performance studies more generally.

== Early life and education ==
Abbate was born to Dolores R. (Kollmeyer) and Russell V. Abbate; she has two sisters. Abbate completed her B.A. at Yale University in 1977. While still an undergraduate at Yale, she reconstructed the score of Claude Debussy's La chute de la maison Usher (The Fall of the House of Usher) – a work long regarded as unsalvageably incomplete. She continued her studies in Munich and Princeton, completing her PhD at Princeton University under J. Merrill Knapp in 1984.

== Career ==
She took a position in the Music Department at Princeton that year, and was named full professor in 1991, becoming at that time the youngest humanities faculty member appointed to that rank. She was awarded the Dent Medal of the Royal Musical Association in 1993, and received a Guggenheim Fellowship in 1994. In 2005, she accepted an appointment at Harvard University and from 2008 to 2012 taught in the Music Department at the University of Pennsylvania as the Christopher H. Browne Distinguished Professor of Music. In 2013, she returned to Harvard, where she was named Paul and Catherine Buttenwieser University Professor in 2014. She has also held appointments at the University of California, Berkeley, and the Freie Universität in Berlin, and has been a fellow of the Wissenschaftskolleg in Berlin, King's College, Cambridge, and the Institute for Advanced Study in Princeton.

In February 2022, Abbate was one of 38 Harvard faculty to sign a letter to the Harvard Crimson defending Professor John Comaroff, who had been found to have violated the university's sexual and professional conduct policies. The letter defended Comaroff as "an excellent colleague, advisor and committed university citizen" and expressed dismay over his being sanctioned by the university. After students filed a lawsuit with detailed allegations of Comaroff's actions and the university's failure to respond, Abbate was one of several signatories to say that she wished to retract her signature.

== Musicological work ==
Abbate's dissertation, entitled The "Parisian" Tannhäuser, addressed historical and aesthetic issues related to the Parisian premiere of Richard Wagner's opera in 1861. A significant excerpt from this work was published in the Journal of the American Musicological Society in 1983. In 1990, she published a translation of Jean-Jacques Nattiez's Musicologie générale et sémiologie under the title Music and Discourse: Toward a Semiology of Music.

Her first monograph, Unsung Voices: Opera and Musical Narrative in the Nineteenth Century, was published by Princeton University Press in 1991. In this book, Abbate explores the metaphor of musical "narrative" in six extended case studies. She describes her work as follows:

[I]n effect I endow certain isolated musical moments with faces, and so with tongues and a special sonorous presence. I construct voices out of musical discourse. The questions that concerned me are: How does this constructed "they" seem to speak? Why do we hear them? What is their force? Precisely which musical gestures can be read as betraying their presence? All six of the succeeding chapters attempt to recover these voices, which -- hence one sense of my title--have to me been overlooked, unsung. Sensitivity to this constructed presence means possessing that "second hearing" (an aural form of "second sight"), which reanimates, I hope, a sense for what is uncanny in music.

— Carolyn Abbate

Her second monograph, In Search of Opera, reflects a close engagement with the aesthetic philosophy of Vladimir Jankélévitch, resulting in an exploration of the intersections of the ineffable and the performative aspects of opera. As in Unsung Voices, Abbate proceeds through a series of case studies, this time exploring works ranging from Mozart's Magic Flute to Wagner's Parsifal and Debussy's Pelleas et Melisande.

== Personal life ==
Abbate was married to Lee Clark Mitchell. She has 2 sons.

== Select publications ==
- "Tristan in the Composition of Pelleas," 19th Century Music, v (1981–2), 117–40
- "Der junge Wagner malgre lui: die frühen Tannhäuser-Entwurfe und Wagners 'übliche Nummern …'" Wagnerliteratur – Wagnerforschung: Munich 1983, 59–68
- "The Parisian Vénus and the Paris Tannhäuser," Journal of the American Musicological Society, xxxvi (1983), 73–123
- With Roger Parker: Analyzing Opera: Verdi and Wagner. Ithaca, NY, 1984 [incl. "Introduction: On Analyzing Opera," pp. 1–26 [with Parker]; "Opera as Symphony: a Wagnerian Myth," pp. 92–124.
- The Parisian Tannhäuser (diss., Princeton U., 1984)
- "Erik's Dream and Tannhäuser's Journey," in Reading Opera. Ithaca, NY, 1986, pp. 129–67
- "What the Sorcerer Said," in 19th Century Music, xii (1988–9), pp. 221–30
- "Elektra's Voice: Music and Language in Strauss's Opera," in Richard Strauss: Elektra, ed. D. Puffett (Cambridge, 1989), pp. 107–27
- "Wagner, 'On Modulation', and Tristan" in Cambridge Opera Journal, i (1989), pp. 33–58
- "Dismembering Mozart" in Cambridge Opera Journal, ii (1990), pp. 187–95
- Music and Discourse: Toward a Semiology of Music (Princeton, NJ, 1990) [trans. of J.-J. Nattiez: Musicologie générale et sémiologie (Paris, 1987)]
- Unsung Voices: Opera and Musical Narrative in the Nineteenth Century (Princeton, NJ, 1991, 2/1996)
- "Opera, or The Envoicing of Women," Musicology and Difference: Gender and Sexuality in Music Scholarship, ed. R.A. Solie (Berkeley, 1993), 225–58
- "Mythische Stimmen, sterbliche Körper," Richard Wagner: “Der Ring des Nibelungen”: Ansichten des Mythos, ed. U. Bermbach und D. Borchmeyer (Stuttgart, 1995), 75–86
- In Search of Opera (Princeton, 2001)
- Music and the Ineffable (Princeton, 2003) [trans of. V. Jankélévitch: La musique et l'ineffable (Paris, 1961)]
- "Music--Drastic or Gnostic?" Critical Inquiry, xxx (2004), 505-536
- "Das Ephemere Übersehen," in Latenz: blinde Passagiere in den Geisteswissenschaften (Göttingen, 2011), 24–50.
- With Roger Parker: A History of Opera. New York: W. W. Norton, 2012
