= Lee Clark Mitchell =

- Born: 1947 (age 78–79)
- Occupations: Author, professor
- Spouse: Carolyn Abbate (div.)
- Children: 2

Academic background
- Education: University of Washington (Ph.D.)

Lee Clark Mitchell (born 1947) is an American author and professor American studies and literature. He is the Holmes Professor of Belles-Lettres at Princeton University and the former chair of the English Department and director of the program in American studies.

== Early life and education ==
Mitchell was born in 1947. He completed his Ph.D. at University of Washington.

== Suspension ==
In 2004 Princeton University suspended Mitchell from his faculty position for a year after an investigation determined that he had misspent approximately $20,000 in research funds over an 8–9-year period.

== Personal life ==
Mitchell was married to musicologist Carolyn Abbate with whom he has two sons. In April 2019, he announced his engagement to Cameron Platt after 7 months of dating. They met in the Fall of 2013 when Mitchell was a professor and later a mentor of Platt. They began a personal relationship in 2018 after Platt completed a master's degree at University of Oxford on a Rhodes Scholarship.

== Selected works ==
=== Books ===
- Mitchell, Lee Clark; Elliot, Emory (1986). New Essays on The Red Badge of Courage. Cambridge University Press. ISBN 9780521315128.
- Mitchell, Lee Clark (1989). Determined Fictions: American Literary Naturalism. Columbia University Press. ISBN 9780231068987.
- Bush, Alfred L.; Mitchell, Lee Clark (1994). The Photograph and the American Indian. Princeton University Press. ISBN 9780691034898.
- Mitchell, Lee Clark (1998). Westerns: Making the Man in Fiction and Film. University of Chicago Press. ISBN 9780226532356.
- Mitchell, Lee Clark (2014). Witnesses to a Vanishing America: The Nineteenth-Century Response. Princeton University Press. ISBN 9781400856152.
- Mitchell, Lee Clark (2017). Mere Reading: The Poetics of Wonder in Modern American Novels. Bloomsbury Publishing USA. ISBN 9781501329678.
- Mitchell, Lee Clark (2018). Late Westerns: The Persistence of a Genre. U of Nebraska Press. ISBN 9781496201966.
- Mitchell, Lee Clark (2019). More Time: Contemporary Short Stories and Late Style. Oxford University Press. ISBN 9780192575791.
- Mitchell, Lee Clark (2020). Mark My Words: Profiles of Punctuation in Modern Literature. Bloomsbury Academic. ISBN 978-1501360732.
