= Times-News (Burlington, North Carolina) =

Newspaper published in Burlington, North Carolina

The Times-News
- The June 27, 2017, front page of The Times-News
- Type: Daily newspaper
- Owner: Paxton Media Group
- Publisher: Paul Mauney
- Editor: Donnie Fetter
- Founded: 1887
- Language: American English
- Headquarters: Burlington, North Carolina, United States
- Circulation: 9,387 (as of 2018)
- OCLC number: 35154691
- Website: thetimesnews.com

The Times-News is an American, English language daily newspaper based in Burlington, North Carolina formed in 1931 by the merger of the Burlington Daily Times and The Burlington News.

== History ==
The Times-News was founded in 1887. It joined Freedom Communications Inc. in 1978, and was sold to Halifax Media Group in 2012. In 2015, Halifax was acquired by New Media Investment Group, which became Gannett in a 2019 merger.

The lineage of The Times-News is as follows:

- The Times-News (1989–present), publisher: Times-News Pub. Co.
- The Daily Times-News (1932–1989), publisher: Times-News Pub. Co.
- Burlington Daily Times-News (1931–1932), publisher: Burlington News Co.
- Burlington Daily Times (1923–1931), publisher: Burlington News Co. (January 18, 1923)
- The Burlington News (1887–1931), publisher: J.R. Ireland & Co.

In November 2022 Paxton Media Group acquired The Burlington News-Times and five other North Carolina newspapers from Gannett Co., Inc.

== Special features ==
The paper includes a weekly Here & Now page that is written by local high school students. The newspaper also uses guest columnist, including as many as 20 local columnists per month. The Times-News has an internet website and Facebook page for interacting with customers.

== Awards ==
In addition to annual state press association awards, The Times-News was a Best of Freedom winner in 2006. In 2006, the North Carolina Press Association recognized The Times-News with awards in sports feature writing, photography, and more. Jay Ashley received first place in Sports Writing for his article, Players Memory Lives On. Additionally, Sam Roberts received third place in Photography, Linda Bowden received second place in Illustration, Lee Barnes received second place in Serious Columns, Tom Dillon received first place in Criticism, and Isaac Groves received third place in News Enterprise Reporting. The Times-News received similar awards from the North Carolina Press Association in 2005 and 2004. It has also won awards in the NNA's Better Newspaper Contest for general excellence, best sports section, photography and writing.

== See also ==
- List of newspapers in North Carolina
