= Richard Pearce (director) =

American film director and cinematographer (born 1943)

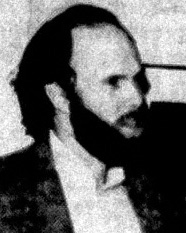
- Pearce in 1976
- Born: January 25, 1943 (age 83); San Diego, California, U.S.
- Occupations: Film director, television director, cinematographer
- Years active: 1970–2006
- Spouse: Lynzee Klingman

Richard Pearce (born January 25, 1943) is an American film director, television director and cinematographer. In addition to feature films, he has directed TV movies and TV series.

== Early life and education ==
Born in 1943 in San Diego, Richard Pearce went east to high school, attending St. Paul's School in Concord, New Hampshire.

He attended Yale University where he earned a B.A. in English in 1965 and where he met D.A. Pennebaker. He moved to New York City and worked with Pennebaker and Richard Leacock on several documentaries.

== Accolades ==
In 1980, he won the Golden Bear award at the 30th Berlin International Film Festival for his film Heartland.

== Filmography ==
=== As director ===
- 1977: The Gardener's Son (TV)
- 1978: Siege (TV)
- 1979: No Other Love (TV)
- 1979: Heartland
- 1981: Threshold
- 1983: Sessions (TV)
- 1984: Country
- 1985: Alfred Hitchcock Presents (TV series)
- 1986: No Mercy
- 1989: Dead Man Out (TV)
- 1989: The Final Days (TV)
- 1990: The Long Walk Home
- 1992: Leap of Faith
- 1993: Homicide: Life on the Street (TV series)
- 1994: Party of Five (TV series)
- 1996: A Family Thing
- 1997: Nothing Sacred (TV series)
- 1998: Thicker Than Blood (TV)
- 1999: Witness Protection (TV)
- 2001: South Pacific (TV)
- 2002: CSI: Miami (TV series)
- 2003: The Blues: The Road to Memphis (TV series)
- 2004: Plainsong (TV)
- 2005: Law & Order: Trial by Jury (TV series)
- 2006: Fatal Contact: Bird Flu in America (TV)

=== As cinematographer ===
- Dont Look Back (1967)
- Woodstock (1970)
- Interviews with My Lai Veterans (1970)
- Marjoe (1972)
- Hearts and Minds (1974) (also associate producer)
- Hair (1979) (additional photographer)
- Food, Inc. (2008)
