= List of awards and honors received by Cormac McCarthy =

The following is a list of awards received by writer Cormac McCarthy:

== Awards ==
- 1959, 1960 Ingram-Merrill awards
- 1965 Traveling Fellowship from the American Academy of Arts and Letters
- 1966 William Faulkner Foundation Award for notable first novel for The Orchard Keeper
- 1969 Guggenheim Fellowship for creative writing
- 1981 MacArthur Fellowship
- 1992 National Book Award for Fiction and the National Book Critics Circle Award for All the Pretty Horses
- 1996 International Dublin Literary Award longlist for The Crossing
- 2000 International Dublin Literary Award longlist for Cities of the Plain
- 2006 James Tait Black Memorial Prize for Fiction and Believer Book Award for The Road
- 2007 Pulitzer Prize for Fiction for The Road
- 2007 International Dublin Literary Award shortlist for No Country for Old Men
- 2008 Maltese Falcon Award, Japan, for No Country for Old Men
- 2008 Premio Ignotus for The Road
- 2008 International Dublin Literary Award longlist for The Road
- 2009 PEN/Saul Bellow Award for Achievement in American Fiction, for a career whose writing "possesses qualities of excellence, ambition, and scale of achievement over a sustained career which place him or her in the highest rank of American literature."
- 2012 Best of the James Tait Black, shortlist, The Road

== See also ==
- Cormac McCarthy bibliography
