= Oxford Bibliographies Online =

British online reference work

- screenshot of the OBO entry for Kathryn Bigelow
- Website type: Online encyclopedia
- Available in: English
- Owner: Oxford University Press
- Website: www.oxfordbibliographies.com
- Commercial: No
- Registration: Yes
- Launched: 17 April 2010; 16 years ago
- Current status: Active
- OCLC number: 871820156

Oxford Bibliographies Online (OBO), also known as Oxford Bibliographies, is a web-based compendium of peer-reviewed annotated bibliographies and short encyclopedia entries maintained by Oxford University Press.

== History ==
Oxford Bibliographies Online launched in 2010 following 18 months of research by Oxford University Press (OUP) on the way students and scholars accessed information. According to OUP, learning on a new topic was often hampered and confused by an overabundance of information that left people without a clear starting point.

The launch version of Oxford Bibliographies Online covered four subject areas – Classics, Social Work, Islamic Studies, and Criminology – and cost US$29.95 per month to access for institutional subscribers. By 2017 it had grown to more than 30 subject areas. At its debut, it was described as "an Anti-Google" and a more authoritative and trustworthy alternative to "crowdsourced knowledge repositories like Wikipedia".

== Organization ==
Oxford Bibliographies Online is divided into several dozen subject areas, each curated by an editor-in-chief and an editorial board composed of "15 to 20" scholars of that subject. Subject areas are, in turn, divided into an expanding number of entries, each of which is authored by a member of the editorial board and subject to a process of peer review. Each entry provides a brief, encyclopedic overview of a given subject, followed by an annotated bibliography of the key literature on that topic. According to Oxford University Press, entries are reviewed annually and updated as necessary. New entries are added monthly.

== Access ==
Libraries can selectively subscribe to all or certain subject areas, allowing their patrons to access those sections to which the institution has purchased a subscription. In the United Kingdom, for instance, public library patrons can access the Victorian Literature and British and Irish Literature subject areas of Oxford Bibliographies Online by using their library card as a log-on credential if their library subscribes. According to Oxford University Press, pricing is based on the size and type of the library.

== See also ==
- Scholarpedia
- Stanford Encyclopedia of Philosophy
