= William Gregg (industrialist) =

American businessman & industrialist (1800–1867)

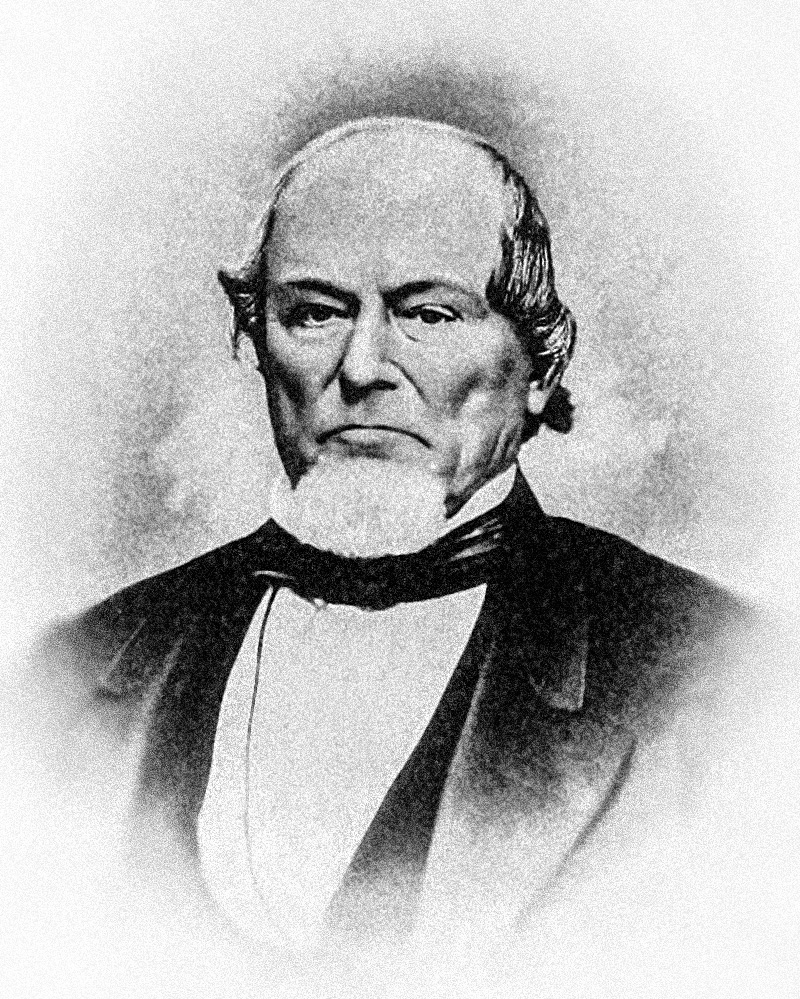
- Undated portrait of Gregg
- Born: February 2, 1800; Monongalia County, Virginia
- Died: September 12, 1867 (aged 67); Kalmia, South Carolina
- Occupation: Industrialist
- Political party: Whig

William Gregg (February 2, 1800 – September 12, 1867) was an ardent advocate of industrialization in the antebellum Southern United States and the founder of the Graniteville Mill, the largest textile mill in South Carolina during the antebellum period. Gregg was a revolutionary figure in the textile industry. His practice of having his employees live in company-owned homes became common.

Gregg publicized his ideas in his 1845 Essays on Domestic Industry. He argued that economic domination by the North was best met by Southern industrialization. He gained sufficient support for his own efforts, but was unable to bring about any general change in the agrarian southern economy.

== Early life ==
William Gregg, considered by many as "the most significant figure in the development of cotton-mills in the South", was born on February 2, 1800, in Monongalia County, Virginia. But some sources state that he was born in Brownsville, Pennsylvania. Gregg was the youngest son of William Gregg and Elizabeth Gregg. The boy's father was a Revolutionary War veteran from Virginia and his mother Elizabeth was a Quaker from Philadelphia. When Gregg was age 4, his mother died, and the boy was reared by a neighbor woman until he was around the age of 10.

After several years of living with his neighbor, Gregg was moved to his Uncle Jacob Gregg's home in Alexandria, Virginia. William Gregg was apprenticed to his Uncle Jacob, who was a successful watchmaker and also a successful spinning machine maker in Alexandria. His early exposure to his uncle's cotton manufacturing plant sparked his long- term interest in the business.

During the War of 1812, Jacob Gregg left watchmaking to pursue and open a cotton mill in Georgia. Jacob Gregg founded the cotton factory on the Little River near Madison, Georgia. This small cotton factory is heralded as one of the first mills in the Southern United States.

Following the War of 1812, Jacob Gregg had encountered economically tough times and could no longer support the young William. Jacob apprenticed William under his friend, Mr. Blanchard. Gregg spent a few years with Blanchard perfecting his watchmaking craft and trade. In 1821, William Gregg moved independently to Petersburg, Virginia, an industrial town, to improve and enhance his craft and trade and perfect his ability.

== Middle life ==
Gregg settled in Columbia. It is here where William Gregg put his knowledge from Mr. Blanchard and his Uncle Jacob to use. Gregg set on to establish his own successful business in mercantile trade. Gregg traded materials such as jewelry, silver, and other hand-crafted specialty goods.

In 1838, Gregg continued his jewelry and silversmithing business, and he acquired interest in what became Hayden, Gregg and Company. Gregg was able to retire with a large amount of discretionary income. This acquisition made Gregg a partner in the jewelry business in Charleston, South Carolina. Gregg moved his family to Lowcounty following the acquisition. Gregg's time spent with the jewelry and silver firm allowed him to secure his fortune and establish the financial security that would allow him to indulge in his original interest of textile manufacturing.

Continuing his string of purchases in 1838; Gregg bought into the Vaucluse Manufacturing Company, which was a cotton mill in the Barnwell District of South Carolina. Gregg rekindled his interest for the industry and bought into the company with his brother in law General James Jones.

Gregg was also active in the South Carolina Whig Party during this time, and was a member.

== "Essays on Domestic Industry" and The Graniteville Company ==
In 1844 Gregg embarked to the North, on a mission to study and examine the numerous textile mills in Massachusetts, Connecticut, Vermont, and New Hampshire. Gregg wanted to improve and enhance the industry in the South as many Southern plants were prone to failure and undercapitalized. Following his return to Charleston, Gregg was very active in the community. William Gregg wrote a series of articles that appeared in the local paper, the Charleston Courier. In these articles, Gregg outlined ways by which businessmen in the South could invest and prosper in manufacturing. Gregg advocated that the region stop remaining over-dependent on plantation agriculture as the only means of commerce in the society. The articles mainly critiqued the South's failure to develop a strong and viable manufacturing sector that could accompany the strengths of the agricultural industry, specifically plantations. Gregg became a leading advocate for industrialization in the South; he published these articles in a pamphlet that was called "Essays on Domestic Industry". This work strongly attacked planters for allowing their ventures to die through inattention and undercapitalization. Gregg's ultimate vision saw the Business capitalists of the South guiding industry and development through applying industry, prudence, and a surplus of capital to manufacturing plants and manufacturing operations.

Gregg became committed to the idea that South Carolina and the South were wasting potential by shipping Raw cotton to the North and buying back these goods at inflated prices. Gregg felt that by keeping local capital, the state would diversify, jobs would be produced, and the economy would become less dependent on cotton growing.

In December 1845, Gregg was able to convince the South Carolina legislature to charter the Graniteville Mill, which became the South's largest and most well known cotton mill. With a group of Charleston elite, the group was granted an initial capitalization of $300,0000. This money was put towards constructing a tremendous and massive state of the art textile factory and plant on Horse creek, which was a couple of miles from Gregg's Vaucluse Mill. The production and construction of the Graniteville Company relied on the local people of the area to build and operate the mill. Farmers, tenants, and the poor were employed with wages similar to those of Northern mill workers. When full operations ceased in 1849, the Graniteville Company mill was one of, if not the largest textile mills in the South. The plant contained more than nine thousand spindles and three hundred looms, and produced around twelve thousand yards of cloth per day. These products were sold across the continent and in markets reaching New York and Philadelphia.

== Later life ==
During the 1850s, Gregg became famous throughout the South. His factory became acclaimed and its model was celebrated. Gregg was credited with providing the South a perfect example of the industrial development that reformers had demanded for many years. Gregg's popularity resulted in his election to the South Carolina House of Representatives in 1856. Gregg also attempted to get elected to the state Senate but was unsuccessful. Gregg faced resistance regarding some of the practices at his plant, but this did not completely hinder his political career.

Gregg remained popular enough to secure his election to South Carolina's secession convention, at which he unhesitatingly affixed his signature to the ordinance of secession in December 1860. Previously a unionist, after Lincoln's election Gregg publicly declared himself to be "openly, fearlessly . . . a disunion man".

During the Civil War, Graniteville continued to prosper. The city survived the Civil War, and Gregg returned to the factory following the war. During the war, Gregg had criticized Confederate Policy, as he believed it restricted manufacturers.

In September 1867, there was a break in the factory dam. While repairing it, Gregg became ill. He died in Kalmia, South Carolina, on September 12. Following his death, the Graniteville Company continued operations and prospered for more than a century.

Gregg's legacy lives on in the South. In 1899 his Essays on Domestic Industry were reprinted by Daniel Augustus Tompkins. Gregg is still heralded as one of the most successful, influential members of the early Southern states.
