= The Orchard Keeper =

1965 novel by Cormac McCarthy

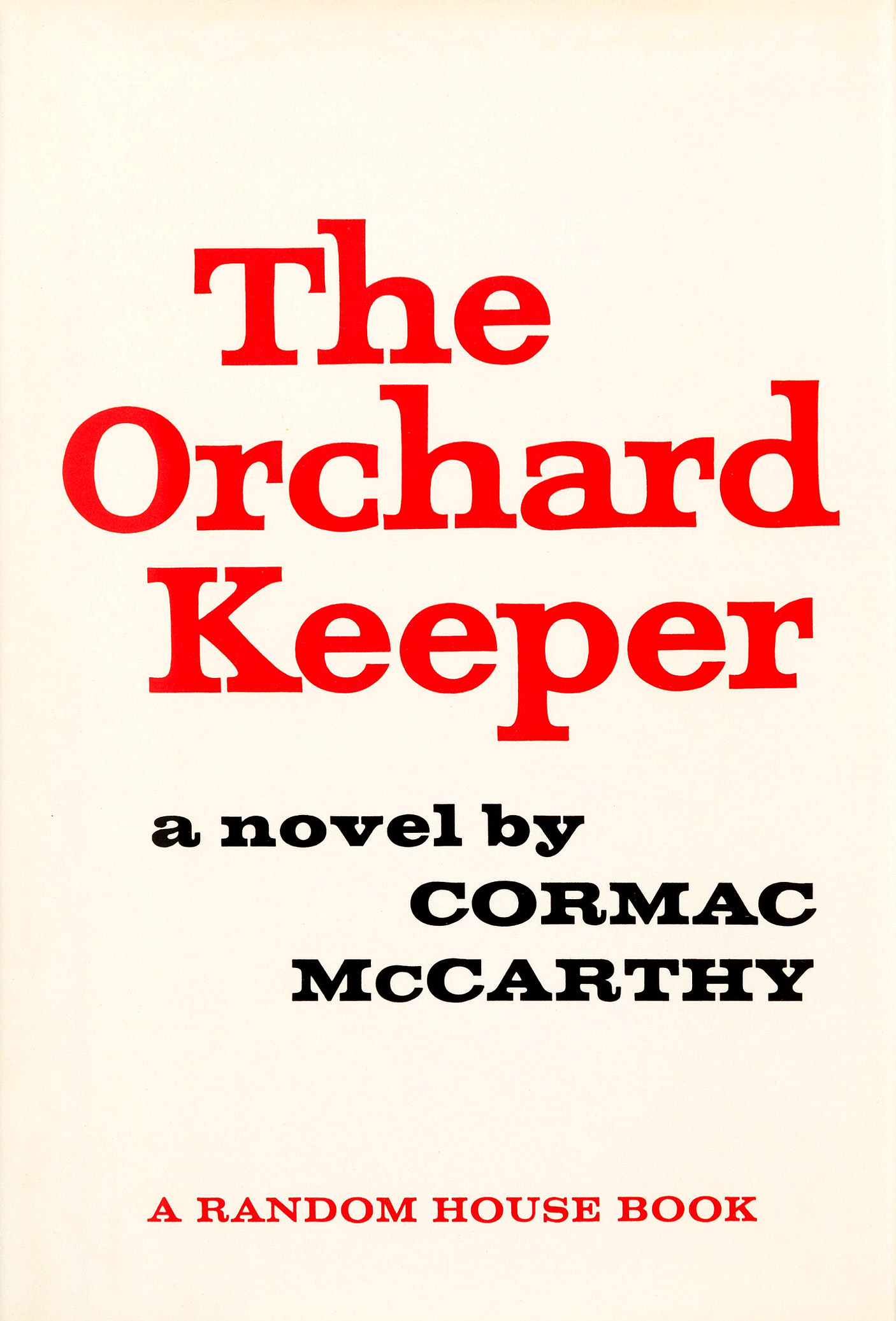
- First edition
- Author: Cormac McCarthy
- Language: English
- Publisher: Random House
- Publication date: May 5, 1965
- Media type: Print
- Pages: 246 (paperback)
- ISBN: 0-394-43936-8
- Followed by: Outer Dark

The Orchard Keeper is the first novel by the American novelist Cormac McCarthy. It won the 1966 William Faulkner Foundation Award for notable first novel.

== Plot ==
The Orchard Keeper is set during the inter-war period in and around the hamlet of Red Branch, a small, isolated mountain community in Tennessee. The story revolves around three characters: Uncle Arthur Ownby, an isolated woodsman, who lives beside a rotting apple orchard; John Wesley Rattner, a young mountain boy; and Marion Sylder, an outlaw and bootlegger.

The novel begins with Marion picking up a hitchhiker named Kenneth Rattner, who attacks Marion with a car jack, attempting to murder and rob him. After a struggle, Marion strangles Kenneth to death. Marion dumps the corpse in a gravel pit on Arthur Ownby's property, as he knows the land well from his frequent pickups of bootleg whiskey. Arthur soon discovers the corpse, but rather than inform authorities, he covers the pit over to keep the body hidden. As time passes, Kenneth's wife, Mildred, and son, John Wesley, come to accept he has likely been killed, and Mildred makes her son vow one day to take vengeance upon his father's killer.

One night, as Marion picks up a whiskey shipment hidden on Arthur's property, he witnesses Arthur unloading a shotgun into a tank the government installed on his land. Unnerved, Marion collects the whiskey and leaves the property, fearing Arthur might do him harm. Arthur passively watches Marion's car drive off into the night. Marion's car careens off the road and into a stream. John Wesley happens to be checking some traps in the area and, hearing the crash, comes to Marion's aid, helping the injured man to land. John Wesley is unaware Marion is his father's killer, and Marion does not recognize John Wesley as the son of the man he killed.

Grateful for his help, Marion gives John Wesley one of his dogs, and the two develop a friendly, almost father-and-son relationship, with Marion teaching John Wesley how to hunt. The local police discover Marion's vehicle in the stream, its whiskey cargo mostly destroyed, as well as the defaced government tank. John Wesley becomes a suspect and is threatened with criminal charges if he doesn't admit Marion was driving the whiskey-filled car. John Wesley refuses to cooperate. The police then go to Arthur's cabin to question him.

As they pull into his yard, Arthur emerges from the cabin wielding a shotgun. The police return with reinforcements, and a shoot-out ensues. Arthur wounds a few officers, then flees, but is captured a short while later. Marion, too, is captured, when his new vehicle breaks down on a bridge, its trunk filled with whiskey. Arthur is diagnosed as insane or senile and is sent to a mental hospital, where he will likely spend the remainder of his days. Marion is sentenced to three years in prison for illegally transporting whiskey. Still oblivious to Marion's role in his father's death, John Wesley leaves Red Branch. Several years later, he returns to find the town abandoned.

== Characters ==
- Kenneth Rattner is an unemployed hitchhiker who attempts to rob and kill Marion Sylder. Sylder strangles him to death and dumps his corpse in Arthur's spray pit.
- John Wesley Rattner is Kenneth Rattner's son. Throughout most of the novel, John Wesley is approximately fourteen years old. No physical description of him is ever given, but McCarthy alludes that he lives alone with his mother. John Wesley is loyal, highly independent, and good natured.
- Marion Sylder is an outlaw and bootlegger who killed Rattner in self-defence. Sylder is married, but his relationship with his wife is never expanded upon.
- Arthur Ownby, also referred to as "The Old Man" and "Uncle Ather", is a hermit who lives alone with his dog in the wilderness. He is acquainted with some of the local boys, eventually including John Wesley.

== Reception ==
In 1965, critic Orville Prescott argued that McCarthy’s extensive use of Faulknerian literary devices and mannerisms in The Orchard Keeper is “exasperating”, though also wrote, “Mr. McCarthy is expert in generating an emotional climate, in suggesting instead of in stating, in creating a long succession of brief, dramatic scenes described with flashing visual impact. He may neglect the motivation of some of his characters. He may leave some doubt as to what is going on now. But he does write with torrential power.” In Kirkus Reviews, it was written that “McCarthy's novel, While [sic] desolate, is effective in many ways; there is some unusual writing furrowed by a stark, visual imagery while the story itself has a shadowed fascination.”

== Bibliography ==
- Pastore, Stephen R. (2013). Rethinking Cormac McCarthy. New York: American Bibliographical Press. ISBN 978-1-9377-2732-1. OCLC 868796132.
