= List of academic journals about specific authors =

The following is a list of notable academic journals and magazines that are devoted to the study of specific authors and philosophers. Some of the journals are not currently active.

Author	Journal
Hannah Arendt	Arendt Studies
Augustine of Hippo	Augustinian Studies; Augustinianum
Jane Austen	Persuasions; Jane Austen Annual
Samuel Beckett	Journal of Beckett Studies; Samuel Beckett Today
George Berkeley	Berkeley Studies
Brontë family	Brontë Studies
Willa Cather	Willa Cather Newsletter & Review
Geoffrey Chaucer	The Chaucer Review
Gilbert Keith Chesterton	The Chesterton Review
Confucius	International Confucian Studies
Joseph Conrad	The Conradian
Gilles Deleuze	Deleuze and Guattari Studies
Jacques Derrida	Derrida Today
Charles Dickens	Dickens Quarterly; Dickens Studies Annual; The Dickensian
James Dickey	James Dickey Review
Emily Dickinson	The Emily Dickinson Journal
Fyodor Dostoevsky	The Dostoevsky Journal: A Comparative Literature Review
Arthur Conan Doyle	The Baker Street Journal
T. S. Eliot	T. S. Eliot Studies Annual
Erasmus	Eramsus Studies formerly: Erasmus of Rotterdam Society Yearbook
Philip José Farmer	Farmerphile: The Magazine of Philip José Farmer
William Faulkner	The Faulkner Journal
F. Scott Fitzgerald	The F. Scott Fitzgerald Review; Fitzgerald/Hemingway Annual
Theodor Fontane	Fontane Blätter
Sigmund Freud	The Psychoanalyst's Journal: Freud-themed & Quoted Journal for Psychologists & Psychiatrists
Mohandas Karamchand Gandhi	The Acorn
Robert Graves	Gravesiana
Graham Greene	Graham Greene Studies
Félix Guattari	Deleuze and Guattari Studies
H. Rider Haggard	Haggard Journal
Thomas Hardy	The Hardy Society Journal
Georg Wilhelm Friedrich Hegel	Hegel Bulletin; Hegel-Jahrbuch; The Owl of Minerva
Martin Heidegger	Heidegger Studies
Ernest Hemingway	Hemingway Review; Fitzgerald/Hemingway Annual
David Hume	Hume Studies
Edmund Husserl	Husserl Studies
Henrik Ibsen	Ibsen Studies
The Inklings	Journal of Inklings Studies; VII: Journal of the Marion E. Wade Center; Mythlore
C. L. R. James	The CLR James Journal
Henry James	The Henry James Review
Ben Jonson	Ben Jonson Journal
James Joyce	James Joyce Quarterly
Franz Kafka	Journal of the Kafka Society of America
Immanuel Kant	Kant Yearbook; Kant-Studien; Kantian Review
Søren Kierkegaard	Kierkegaard Studies Yearbook; Kierkegaard Studies Monograph Series
D. H. Lawrence	D. H. Lawrence Review
Martin Luther King Jr.	The Acorn
Gottfried Wilhelm Leibniz	The Leibniz Review; Studia Leibnitiana
Emmanuel Levinas	Levinas Studies
C. S. Lewis	Sehnsucht: The C. S. Lewis Journal; VII: Journal of the Marion E. Wade Center
Abraham Lincoln	The Journal of the Abraham Lincoln Association
Bernard Lonergan	The Lonergan Review
Pierre Loti	Bulletin de l'Association internationale des amis de Pierre Loti
Thomas Mann	Thomas Mann Jahrbuch (in German)
Cormac McCarthy	The Cormac McCarthy Journal
Herman Melville	Leviathan
Maurice Merleau-Ponty	Chiasmi International
Michel de Montaigne	Montaigne Studies
Thomas More	Moreana
Vladimir Nabokov	Nabokov Studies
Friedrich Nietzsche	New Nietzsche Studies; The Journal of Nietzsche Studies
Paul the Apostle	Pauline Studies; Journal for the Study of Paul and His Letters
Blaise Pascal	Courrier Blaise Pascal
Edgar Allan Poe	Poe Studies: History, Theory, Interpretation
Marcel Proust	Marcel Proust Bulletin
Ayn Rand	The Journal of Ayn Rand Studies
Philip Roth	Philip Roth Studies
Jean-Paul Sartre	Sartre Studies International
William Shakespeare	Shakespeare Bulletin; Shakespeare Quarterly; The Shakespeare Yearbook
George Bernard Shaw	SHAW: The Annual of Bernard Shaw Studies
Wallace Stevens	The Wallace Stevens Journal
J. R. R. Tolkien	Tolkien Studies; Journal of Tolkien Research; Mallorn; VII: Journal of the Marion E. Wade Center; Quettar
Leo Tolstoy	Tolstoy Studies Journal
Giambattista Vico	New Vico Studies
Virginia Woolf	Virginia Woolf Bulletin
Slavoj Žižek	International Journal of Žižek Studies
