= IJPL =

IJPL may refer to:

- International Journal of Private Law
- International Journal of Persian Literature
