= Alireza Korangy =

Iranian-American linguist and critic

- علیرضا کورنگی
- Education: Harvard University (Ph.D.)
- Alma mater: Harvard University (M.Phil, Ph.D.); The College of William and Mary (BA)
- Children: Iran Ghazal Korangy
- Scientific career
- Fields: Persian literature, linguistics, poetics
- Workplaces: University of Virginia, University of Colorado at Boulder, American University of Beirut
- Thesis: Development of the Ghazal and Khaqani's Contribution: A Study on the Development of Ghazal and a Literary Exegesis of a 12th C. Poetic Harbinger (2007)
- Doctoral advisor: Wheeler M. Thackston
- Other academic advisors: Wolfhart Heinrichs; Jay M. Harris [Ahmad Mahdavi Damghani] [Mohammad Reza Shafii Kadkani] [Seyyed Jafar Shahidi] [Mir Jalal al-Din Kazzai]

Alireza Korangy is an Iranian-American literary critic, philologist and linguist. He was most recently faculty at the American University of Beirut. He was previously an assistant professor at the University of Virginia. Korangy also taught at the University of Colorado at Boulder. He is the editor-in-chief of the International Journal of Persian Literature and is known for his works on Persian poetry, Iranian and Semitic philology and linguistics, and folklore. He is editor-in-chief of the series Springer Handbooks in Languages and Linguistics (Springer Nature), the series Iranian and Persian Studies (Springer Nature), Mouton Companion to Iranian Languages and Linguistics series (Mouton), and the series Martyrdom and Literature (Harrassowitz).

== Career ==
Korangy is interested in classical Persian and Arabic philology with a focus on poetics, rhetoric, and linguistics. In his 2013 book, Development of the Ghazal and Khāqānī's Contribution, Korangy provides a detailed commentary on Khāqānī and his status in Persian ghazal development. Rebecca Gould admires Korangy's genealogy of Khāqānī and believes it is the most thorough genealogy of the poet's influences in any language. Ali-Asghar Seyed-Gohrab calls Kroangy's book on Khāqānī "a valuable monograph" in which the author provides an account of the origins, developments and characteristics of sabk-e Khorasani, an early Persian poetic style. Korangy is also the editor of several volumes on Islamic/Iranian philosophy, literature and linguistics, among them is a festschrift of Ahmad Mahdavi Damghani titled Essays in Islamic Philology, History, and Philosophy.

== Some of Korangy's publications (Short Bibliography) ==
- The Handbook of Cultural Linguistics (ed.), Springer 2024. doi:10.1007/978-981-99-3800-1 Hb ISBN 978-981-99-3799-8, ebook ISBN 978-981-99-3800-1
- Development of the Ghazal and Khāqānī's Contribution, with a foreword by Wolfhart P. Heinrichs, Wiesbaden: Harrassowitz Verlag 2013, ISBN 978-3-447-06955-7
- Kurdish Art and Identity (ed.), preface by Philip G. Kreyenbroek, De Gruyter 2020
- Persian Linguistics in Cultural Contexts, co-editor with Farzad Sharifian, Routledge 2020
- Essays on Typology of Iranian Languages, co-editor with Behrooz Mahmoodi-Bakhtiari, De Gruyter 2019
- The Beloved in Middle Eastern Literatures: The Culture of Love and Languishing. co-editor with Hanadi Al-Samman & Michael Beard, London: I.B. Tauris, 2017
- Essays in Islamic Philology, History, and Philosophy, co-editor with Wheeler M. Thackston, Roy P. Mottahedeh and William Granara, De Gruyter 2016
- Urdu and Indo-Persian Thought, Poetics, and Belles Lettres (ed.), Brill 2017
- Trends in Iranian and Persian Linguistics, co-editor with Corey Miller, De Gruyter Mouton 2018
- The 'Other' Martyrs: Women and the Poetics of Sexuality, Sacrifice, and Death in World Literatures, co-editor with Leyla Rouhi, Harrassowitz Verlag 2019
- No Tapping around Philology: A Festschrift in Honor of Wheeler McIntosh Thackston Jr.'s 70th Birthday, co-editor with Daniel J Sheffield, Harrassowitz Verlag 2014
