= Kierkegaard (surname) =

Kierkegaard [ˈkʰiɐ̯kəˌkɒˀ] is a Danish surname, literally meaning 'church farm' or 'church yard' and colloquially meaning 'graveyard'. Note that the double a is equivalent of å in common nouns and is retained from the pre-1948 orthography in proper nouns only.

Notable people with the surname include:

- Aage Kirkegaard, Danish field hockey player
- Christer Kierkegaard (1918–1999), Swedish Navy rear admiral
- Emil Kirkegaard, founder of OpenPsych
- Helene Kirkegaard (born 1971), Danish badminton player
- Jacob Kirkegaard (born 1975), Danish sound artist
- Jens Kirkegaard (1889–1966), Danish gymnast
- Karla Kirkegaard (born 1954), American geneticist and microbiologist
- Lukas Kirkegaard (born 2005), Danish footballer
- Ole Lund Kirkegaard (1940–2001), Danish writer
- Niels Christian Kierkegaard (1806–1882), Danish painter
- Peter Kierkegaard (1805–1888), Danish theologian
- Phyllis Kirkegaard (1927–2006), American actress
- Søren Kierkegaard (1813–1855), Danish philosopher
- Sylvia Kierkegaard (1952–2015), Philippine law scholar
