= Rousseau, Nature, and the Problem of the Good Life =

1999 book by Laurence D. Cooper

- Author: Laurence D. Cooper
- Publisher: Penn State Press
- Publication date: 1999
- Pages: 240
- ISBN: 978-0-271-02988-7

Rousseau, Nature, and the Problem of the Good Life is a 1999 analysis of Jean-Jacques Rousseau's works, written by Laurence D. Cooper.
