= The Cormac McCarthy Journal =

- Cover of The Cormac McCarthy Journal Vol. 14, No. 2 (2016), featuring a photograph of the author by Derek Shapton
- Discipline: Cormac McCarthy studies; American literature; literary criticism
- Language: English
- Edited by: Stacey Peebles

Publication details
- History: 2001–present
- Publisher: Penn State University Press (United States)
- Frequency: Biannual
- Impact factor: 0.1 (2022)

Standard abbreviations
- ISO 4: Cormac McCarthy J.

Indexing
- ISSN: 2333-3073 (print); 2333-3065 (web)
- LCCN: 2009263299
- JSTOR: cormmccaj
- OCLC no.: 49857355

Links
- Journal homepage

The Cormac McCarthy Journal is a biannual peer-reviewed academic journal of literary criticism dedicated to the study of the American author Cormac McCarthy (1933–2023). The journal launched in 2001 as an annual publication of the Cormac McCarthy Society. Since 2015, issues are published on a biannual basis by the Penn State University Press.

After decades in obscurity, McCarthy achieved his first mainstream commercial breakthrough with the bestselling novel All the Pretty Horses (1992), drawing new attention from critics and scholars. The Cormac McCarthy Society was established in 1993 as a literary society promoting study of his works. The journal originated with papers published online at the society's website before the appearance of its first print edition. Its contents have focused on literary criticism of McCarthy's works as well as biographical and historical research on topics related to his life and fiction.

The journal has been a major exponent of McCarthy studies since its inception. According to the literary scholar Steven Frye, it developed from "a publication committed to the interests of a small group of like-minded scholars" into "a fully developed professional academic journal, indexed in all major outlets." While there are many academic journals about specific authors, The Cormac McCarthy Journal is a rare example of such a journal founded while the author in question was still alive.

== Background on early McCarthy studies and the Cormac McCarthy Society ==
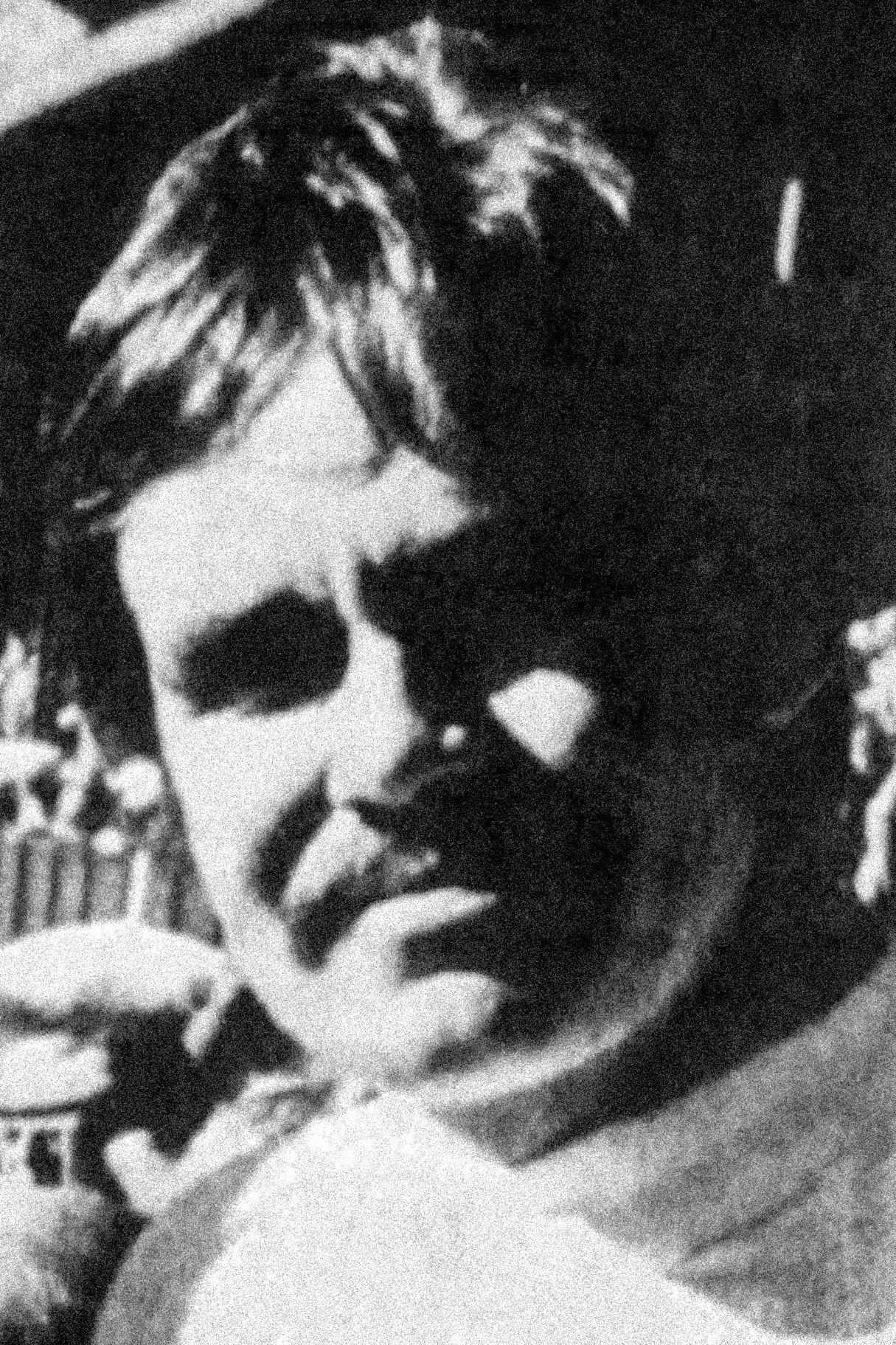
McCarthy c. 1980, when he was an obscure author

By the 2010s McCarthy had entered the literary canon as one of the most highly esteemed American authors of the late 20th and early 21st centuries. However, he did not acquire this stature until relatively late in his writing career. His early works received positive reviews but were virtually unknown outside of a small coterie of academics. Between the publication of his first novel in 1965 until about 1992, he received little critical notice—much less than his major contemporaries (i.e., those born in the 1930s) like Toni Morrison, Philip Roth, John Updike, and Thomas Pynchon. The first in-depth treatment of McCarthy's work was the monograph The Achievement of Cormac McCarthy (1988) by Vereen M. Bell.

Then, in 1992, McCarthy had his first major commercial and critical success almost 30 years into his writing career. All the Pretty Horses became an unexpected bestselling hit, bringing a wave of interest from critics, scholars, and journalists. Most of the first wave of McCarthy scholarship appeared in essay collections published as anthologies by university presses. Among the journals that took a consistent early interest in McCarthy's work were Southwestern American Literature, Western American Literature, and The Southern Review. In summer 1992, The Southern Quarterly published an entire issue devoted to McCarthy, and most of the essays collected in the journal were later republished as Perspectives on Cormac McCarthy by the University Press of Mississippi.

The Cormac McCarthy Society became the central organization for the study of his fiction. The literary society gathered an informal group of scholars who had attended the first academic conference on McCarthy, which took place October 1993 at Bellarmine College in Louisville, Kentucky. Most scholars in attendance came from universities in the Southern United States and had overlapping interests in literature of the South, particularly William Faulkner, to whom McCarthy was often compared. Scholars in the Cormac McCarthy Society, however, saw McCarthy as a great author worthy of study in his own right, and sought to counter perceptions that he was influenced by Faulkner to the point of derivativeness. The organization organized further conferences on the author's fiction and became a member group of the American Literature Association in 1998.

== Publication history ==
=== The Cormac McCarthy Society (1998–2014) ===
Originally, the journal was published by the Cormac McCarthy Society itself. In January 1997, the McCarthy Society went online at the website Cormacmccarthy.com, which had been launched two years prior by the McCarthy enthusiast Marty Priola. Society members began self-publishing scholarly articles on the website by 1998. At this stage, the website's journal section was more of an informal repository for McCarthy scholarship than a regular periodical.

The first print edition of The Cormac McCarthy Journal appeared in 2001, with new issues published on a roughly annual basis. The journal joined the Council of Editors of Learned Journals. The position of editor was mostly held by John Wegner of Angelo State University from its first issue until about 2009, though other scholars stepped into the role of editor as needed. The online journal moved from the McCarthy Society's website to the Texas Digital Library repository in 2009. In 2010, Stacey Peebles of Centre College took over as editor.

=== Penn State University Press (2015–present) ===
In 2014, Penn State University Press announced that it would begin publishing The Cormac McCarthy Journal the following year. It continued to be formally affiliated with the Cormac McCarthy Society. The Cormac McCarthy Journal joined Penn State University Press's roster of journals covering individual authors, including Edgar Allan Poe, F. Scott Fitzgerald, Mark Twain, and Edith Wharton. James McWilliams, a professor at Texas State University, remarked that the announcement signaled a "rare honor for any writer, much less a living one, to achieve" and said the journal's adoption by a university press "speaks volumes about the enduring themes that McCarthy continues to engage with Faulknerian ambition and Homeric prose." The journal's back catalog of articles, including those that were self-published by the Cormac McCarthy Society, became available online through scholarly databases like JSTOR and Project MUSE. The print journal began publishing two issues a year in 2016.

By the time of McCarthy's death in 2023, The Cormac McCarthy Journal remained the only periodical dedicated to the author and his works. Also at that time, The Cormac McCarthy Journal was one of only three academic journals about a specific author that had begun publication within the author's own lifetime to be listed on the MLA Directory of Periodicals, alongside journals devoted to James Dickey and Philip Roth.

== Content ==
The Cormac McCarthy Journal is the central publication in McCarthy studies. The journal publishes articles about the works of Cormac McCarthy, as well as adaptations of his works and other relevant texts. Beyond literary criticism, articles of historical and biographical scholarship have also been an important focus of the journal. Journal contributions in this area by the Knoxville, Tennessee-based writer Wesley Morgan have been especially noted; these include coverage of McCarthy's high school years, documentation of real-life people who provided inspiration for characters in Suttree (1979), and a detailed tracing of the route taken by the characters in The Road (2006) based on close reading of geographical landmarks.

As of 2013, Blood Meridian (1985) was the most-discussed of McCarthy's works in the journal, while bestsellers like All the Pretty Horses (1992), No Country for Old Men (2005), and The Road had also received significant attention. In the journal's first issue, an article by Dianne C. Luce—who was then-president of the McCarthy Society—remarked that scholarship up to that time had prioritized the author's more recent Westerns, starting with Blood Meridian and continuing with The Border Trilogy, while tending to overlook his Southern works: the novels The Orchard Keeper (1965), Outer Dark (1968), Child of God (1973), and Suttree, and the dramas The Gardener's Son (1977) and The Stonemason (1995). Subsequent articles in the journal on these works renewed interest in this period of McCarthy's writing.

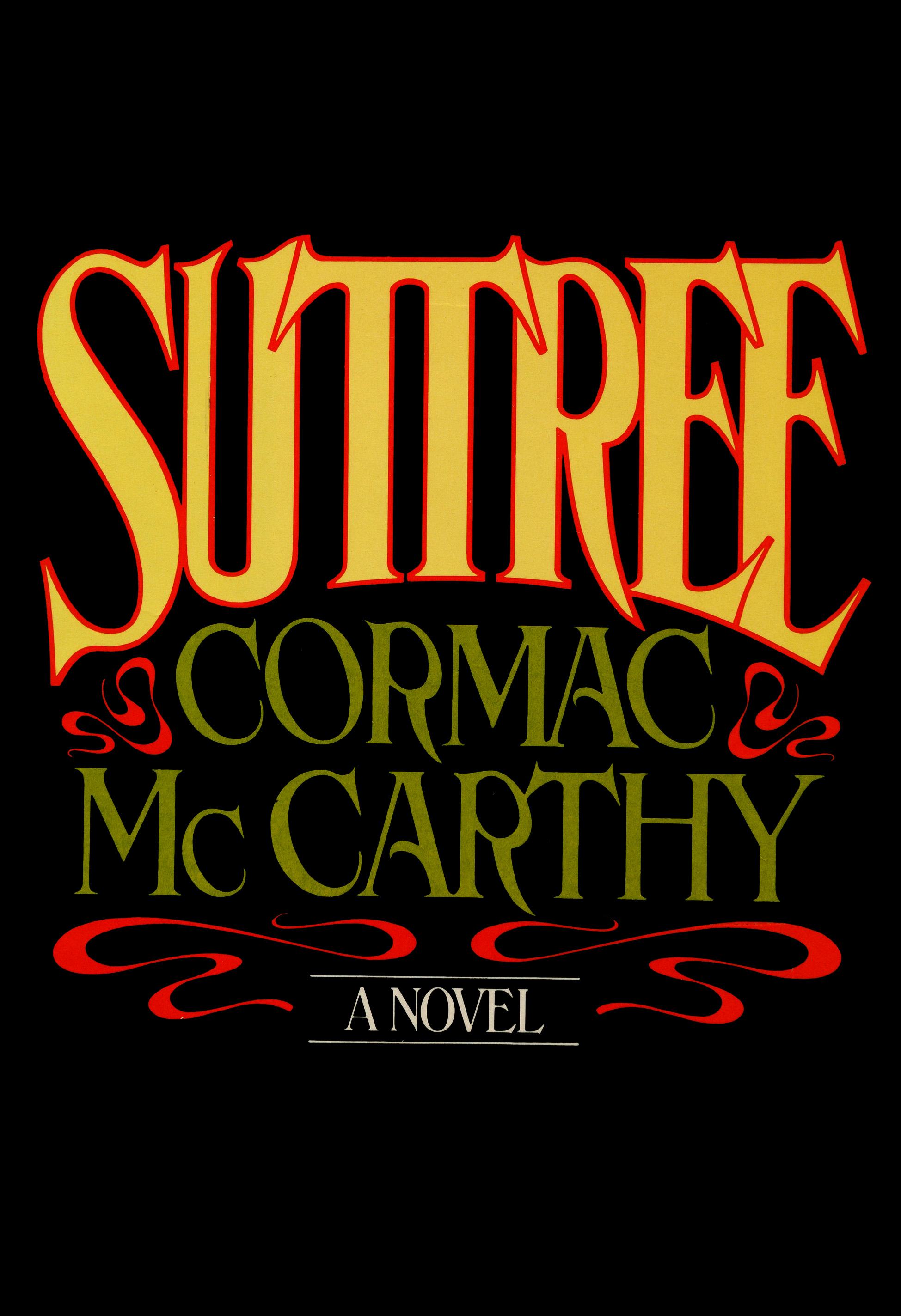
Suttree (1979)

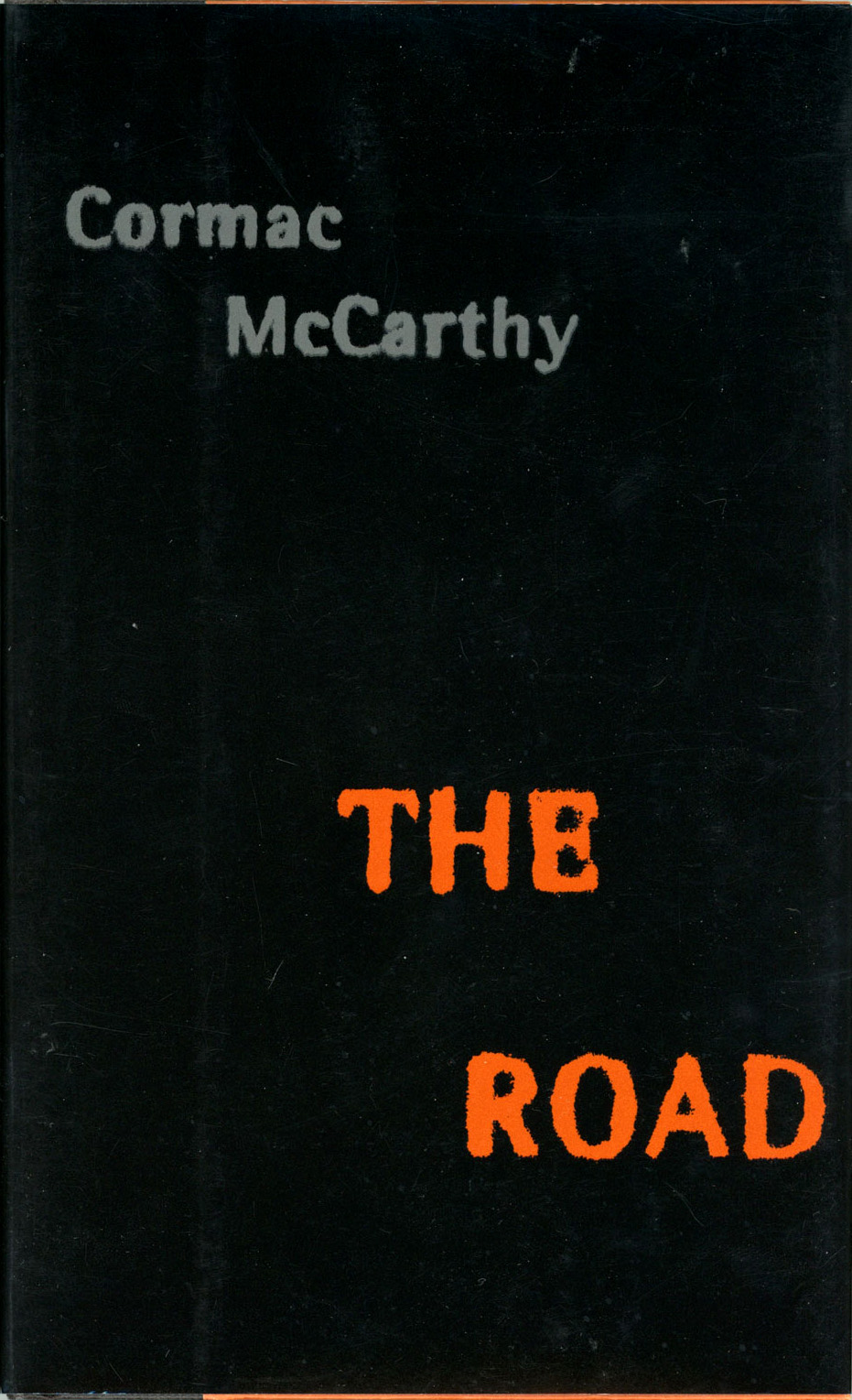
The Road (2006)

The Cormac McCarthy Journal has published special issues focused on the novels Suttree and The Road.

Special issues of the journal have been devoted to individual works by McCarthy. In 2004, the journal commemorated the silver anniversary of the publication of Suttree (1979) with a collection of papers collected from a conference celebrating the novel in its central setting of Knoxville, Tennessee. According to McCarthy scholar Peter Josyph, the Suttree conference papers were originally intended for publication as an anthology, and its failure to materialize in book form served as an example of the "Suttree Syndrome" of critical neglect toward a novel he regards as a "masterpiece". An essay collection on Suttree, expanding on the special issue with additional papers from the 25th-anniversary conference, was published in 2013. Shortly after the publication of The Road, the journal dedicated a special issue to the novel with "investigations of the father-son relationship, the realism of the geography, pastoral imagery, philosophical contexts, and, ultimately, the interrelationship of these issues with McCarthy's other works."

In 2022, the journal published an archival trove of several rare interviews with McCarthy printed in small newspapers in Tennessee and Kentucky, between 1968 and 1980. Given the author's reluctance to engage with the press, the journal's find was considered a noteworthy source of insight into the early period of his career. The article received coverage in such outlets as The New York Times, Kirkus Reviews, and the Knoxville News Sentinel, the last of which had originally printed two of the articles republished by The Cormac McCarthy Journal.

== Indexing and abstracting ==
The journal is indexed and abstracted in the following bibliographic databases:

- EBSCO Literary Reference Center
- Emerging Sources Citation Index
- ERIH PLUS
- International Bibliography of Periodical Literature
- JSTOR
- MLA International Bibliography
- Project MUSE
- ProQuest Literature Online

According to the Journal Citation Reports, the journal has a 2022 impact factor of 0.1.

== See also ==
- List of academic journals about specific authors

== Sources ==
- Anon. (n.d.). "Search [2333-3073]". Web of Science Master Journal List. Clarivate. Archived from the original on July 9, 2023.
- Anon. (n.d.). "Search results for Periodical/Series: The Cormac McCarthy Journal". IBZ Online. Berlin: De Gruyter. Archived from the original on July 9, 2023.
- Anon. (n.d.). "Literary Reference Center Database Coverage List". EBSCO.com. Ipswich, Massachusetts: EBSCO Information Services. Archived from the original on July 10, 2023.
- Anon. (n.d.). "Journal information | ERIH PLUS | NSD". ERIH PLUS / kanalregister.hkdir.no. Bergen: Norwegian Directorate for Higher Education and Skills. Archived from the original on July 9, 2023.
- Anon. (n.d.). "The Cormac McCarthy Journal". Literature Online. Ann Arbor, Michigan. Archived from the original on July 10, 2023.
- Anon. (2023). "The Cormac McCarthy Journal". 2022 Journal Citation Reports. Web of Science (Emerging Sources Citation Index ed.). Clarivate.
- Arnold, Edwin T. (Spring 2005). "Introduction". The Cormac McCarthy Journal. 4 (1). The Cormac McCarthy Society: 3–9. JSTOR 42909725.
- ——— (2008). Foreword. Notes on Blood Meridian. By Sepich, John (revised and expanded ed.). Austin: University of Texas Press. pp. xi–xvii. doi:10.7560/718203-001. ISBN 978-0-292-71820-3.
- Arnold, Edwin T.; Luce, Dianne C. (1999). "Introduction". In Arnold, Edwin T.; Luce, Dianne C. (eds.). Perspectives on Cormac McCarthy. Jackson: University Press of Mississippi. ISBN 1-57806-104-0 – via the Internet Archive.
- Brown, Sherri L.; Senf, Carol; Stockstill, Ellen J. (2018). A Research Guide to Gothic Literature in English: Print and Electronic Sources. Lanham, Maryland: Rowman & Littlefield. ISBN 978-1-4422-7748-9.
- Flyn, Cal (September 23, 2019). "The Best Cormac McCarthy Books recommended by Stacey Peebles". Five Books. Archived from the original on May 31, 2023.
- Frye, Steven (2017). "Prospects for the Study of Cormac McCarthy". Resources for American Literary Study. 39. University Park: Penn State University Press: 1–26. doi:10.5325/resoamerlitestud.39.2017.0001. ISSN 1529-1502.
- ——— (October 27, 2022). "Cormac McCarthy". Oxford Bibliographies Online. Oxford University Press. doi:10.1093/OBO/9780199827251-0122. ISBN 978-0-19-982725-1.
- Harris, Elizabeth A. (September 30, 2022). "Early Cormac McCarthy Interviews Rediscovered". The New York Times. Archived from the original on September 30, 2022.
- Josyph, Peter (2010). Adventures in Reading Cormac McCarthy. Lanham, Maryland: Scarecrow Press. ISBN 978-0-8108-7707-8.
- Luce, Dianne C. (Spring 2001). "Remarks on the State of Cormac McCarthy Scholarship". The Cormac McCarthy Journal. 1 (1). Miami: The Cormac McCarthy Society: 7–11. JSTOR 42909329.
- Luce, Dianne C.; Turpin, Zachary (October 1, 2022). "Cormac McCarthy's Interviews in Tennessee and Kentucky, 1968–1980". The Cormac McCarthy Journal. 20 (2). University Park: Penn State University Press: 108–135. doi:10.5325/cormmccaj.20.2.0108.
- McWilliams, James (July 2, 2014). "Darkness Laughable: The Comic Genius of Cormac McCarthy". Pacific Standard. Santa Barbara, California: The Social Justice Foundation. Archived from the original on August 8, 2019.
- Monk, Nicholas (February 12, 2013). "'News from another World': Career and Critical Responses to Cormac McCarthy". Literature Compass. 10 (2). Wiley: 111–121. doi:10.1111/lic3.12030.
- Park, Kristi (August 7, 2009). "Cormac McCarthy Journal comes to TDL Electronic Press". TDL.org. Austin: Texas Digital Library. Archived from the original on August 16, 2009.
- Parris, Amanda K. (July 12, 2023). "Saving Cormac McCarthy?". Comparative and Continental Philosophy. 15 (1–2). Taylor & Francis: 129–134. doi:10.1080/17570638.2023.2234699. ISSN 1757-0646. S2CID 259871435.
- Peebles, Stacey (2015). "Editor's Introduction". The Cormac McCarthy Journal. 13 (1). University Park: Penn State University Press: 1–2. doi:10.5325/cormmccaj.13.1.0001. Project MUSE 593108.
- ——— (2020). "Cormac McCarthy: A Critical History". In Frye, Steven (ed.). Cormac McCarthy in Context. Cambridge University Press. pp. 316–325. doi:10.1017/9781108772297.030. ISBN 978-1-108-48883-9. S2CID 235036177.
- Peebles, Stacey; West, Benjamin, eds. (2021). Approaches to Teaching the Works of Cormac McCarthy (ebook ed.). New York: Modern Language Association. ISBN 978-1-60329-483-6.
- Schaub, Michael (September 29, 2022). "Early Interviews With Cormac McCarthy Rediscovered". Kirkus Reviews. New York: Kirkus Media, LLC. Archived from the original on September 30, 2022.
- Shannon, Noah Gallagher (September 5, 2017). "Old Woods and Deep". Oxford American (98). Little Rock, Arkansas: The Oxford American Literary Project, Inc. Archived from the original on September 26, 2021.
- Shelton, Ryan (June 20, 2023). "A Gift to Read: A Prophecy of Cormac McCarthy (1933–2023)". Ad Fontes. Landrum, South Carolina: The Davenant Institute. Archived from the original on June 20, 2023.
- Texas Digital Library staff (April 1, 2010). "Latest issues of JoTWW and Cormac McCarthy journals available". TDL.org. Austin: Texas Digital Library. Archived from the original on July 27, 2022.
- Turner, Devarrick (October 9, 2022). "Cormac McCarthy's rare interviews shine a light on one of America's most revered novelists". Knoxville News Sentinel. Gannett. Archived from the original on June 13, 2023.
- Vieth, Ronja (September 2012). "Cormac McCarthy's Critical Reception". In Cremean, David (ed.). Critical Insights: Cormac McCarthy. Hackensack, New Jersey: Salem Press. pp. 29–49. ISBN 978-1-4298-3725-5. EBSCOhost 83406706.
- Wallach, Rick (2013). "Editor's Introduction to the Revised Edition". In Wallach, Rick (ed.). You Would Not Believe What Watches: Suttree and Cormac McCarthy's Knoxville. Casebook Studies in Cormac McCarthy. Vol. 1. Baton Rouge: Louisiana State University Press. pp. iii–iv. ISBN 978-1-62209-263-5.
- Wegner, John (Spring 2001). "Editor's Page". The Cormac McCarthy Journal. 1 (1). The Cormac McCarthy Society: 4–6. JSTOR 42909328.
- ——— (Fall 2009). "Editor's Page". The Cormac McCarthy Journal. 7 (1). The Cormac McCarthy Society: iii. JSTOR 42909393.
- Yarbrough, Scott; Peebles, Stacey (April 23, 2021). "Episode 8: The Cormac McCarthy Journal with Stacey Peebles". Reading McCarthy (Podcast) – via Audible.
