= Rodelle Weintraub =

American author and editor

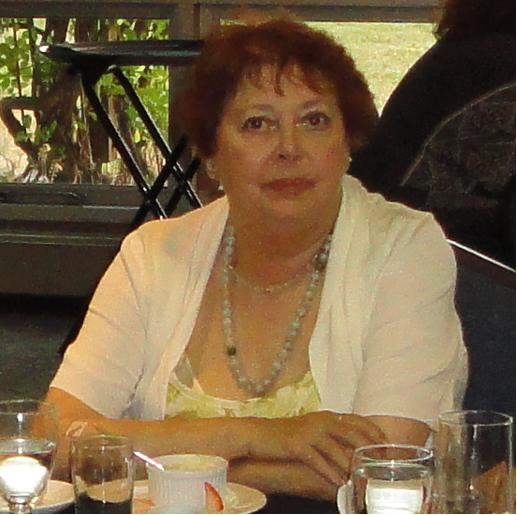
- Born: Rodelle Selma Horwitz; April 29, 1933 (age 93); Philadelphia, Pennsylvania, U.S.
- Monuments: Weintraub Center for the Study of the Arts and Humanities
- Education: B.S. degree in Elementary Education
- Alma mater: Temple University; West Chester University
- Occupations: professor, editor, writing consultant
- Spouse: Stanley Weintraub (1954–2019, his death)
- Children: 3

Rodelle Selma Horwitz Weintraub (born April 29, 1933) is an American author, editor, professor, and public speaker. The focus of her career includes specializing in the works of George Bernard Shaw. She is the assistant editor of The Shaw Review. In 1982, the West Chester University the Weintraub Center for the Study of the Arts and Humanities was endowed by Weintraub and her husband, Stanley Weintraub. The center holds a collection of their books, papers and memorabilia. She was one of the founders of the Bellefonte–State College Jewish Community Center, established in 1955, which became known as Congregation Brit Shalom. In 1963, she was named as the president of the synagogue, which established her as the first woman in the US to head a Jewish congregation.

== Personal background ==
Rodelle Selma Horwitz was born on April 29, 1933, in Philadelphia, Pennsylvania. She is the daughter of Benjamin Raphael and Minerva (née Wascoff) Horwitz. In 1950, she graduated from the Philadelphia High School for Girls. After school, she began attending the West Chester State Teachers College, now known as the West Chester University, before transferring to Temple University in Philadelphia. In 1954, she earned a Bachelor's degree in Elementary Education.

She married Stanley Weintraub on June 6, 1954. They have three children. In September 1954, they relocated to State College, Pennsylvania, with her husband. They lived in Centre County, before moving to Newark, Delaware, in 2003.

== Professional background ==
Teaching

Weintraub taught business and technical writing at Pennsylvania State University. She retired after 14 years. She has also served as a technical writing consultant.

Editing

Weintraub's background includes working as a literary editor. The book, Beardsley, which she served as editor, was nominated for a National Book Award. Another book which she edited includes Victoria, which was on the bestseller list in England. She has also served as the editor of the Bulletin of the Wilmington Delaware Chapter of Hadassah, of which she was also a board member. She is also the editor of the Beech Hill Maintenance Association's monthly newsletter, of which she is one of their corporate officers. She has had reviews published in The New Republic and the San Francisco Review of Books.

Public speaking

She has offered keynote addresses and workshops on writing in the United States, as well as in Brazil, Canada, and throughout Western Europe and South Africa.

== Board memberships ==
- Co-founder of Bellefonte–State College Jewish Community Center-Congregation Brit Shalom (1955)
- President of the Congregation Brit Shalom (1963)
- Member of the National Organization for Women
- Member of the League of Women Voters
- President of the Harris Acres Civic Association
- Member and Chairperson of the Boalsburg Water Authority
- Charter member of the National Museum for Women Artists
- Founding member of the National Museum of American Jewish History in Philadelphia
- Former board member of the Delaware Symphony Orchestra
- Former board member of the Newark Symphony Orchestra
- Former Member and President of the Delaware Chamber Music Festival
- Former Member and President of the Friends of the Newark Symphony
- Former board member of Wilmington, Delaware Chapter of Hadassah
- Corporate officer of the Beech Hill Maintenance Association
- Member of the International Shaw Society
- Former Member of the International Association of Irish Literature

== Published works ==
Author

- "Shaw's Celibate Marriage: Its Impact on His Plays," Cahiers Victoriens & Edouardiens, October 1979
- "'Only the man . . . draws clear of it': a new look at Anthony Anderson" The Shaw Review, September 1980
- "The Irish Lady in Shaw's Plays," The Shaw Review, May 1980
- "Misalliance as High Comedy," 1984-85 Humanities Booklet #4
- "Johnny's Dream: Misalliance" Shaw 7, 1987
- "A Parachutist Prototype for Lina," Shaw 8, 1988*
- "Getting Married? An Edwardian Dilemma," The Once and Future Shaw, 1990
- “Votes for Women: Bernard Shaw and the Women’s Suffrage Movement,” Ritual Remembering History, Myth and Politics in Anglo-Irish Drama, Costerus New Series 99, 1995
- “Bernard Shaw’s Fantasy Island: Simpleton of the Unexpected Isles,” The Classical World and the Mediterranean, Universita de Sassari, 1996
- "Oh, the Dreaming, the Dreaming: Arms and the Man", Shaw and Other Matters, Associated University Presses 1998
- “Don Roberto in Bernard Shaw’s Plays,” SHAW 31, 2011
- “What Makes Johnny Run? Shaw's Man and Superman as a Pre-Freudian Dream Play,” ABEI Journal The Brazilian Journal of Irish Studies, Number 5, June 2003
- “Bernard Shaw’s Henry Higgins: A Classic Aspergen,” English Literature in Translation 1880-1920, Vol. 49, No. 4, 2006
- "Forward," "Shaw and Feminisms On Stage and Off" D. a. Hatfield & Jean Reynolds, eds. University Press of Florida, 2013

Co-authored with Stanley Weintraub

- Lawrence of Arabia: The Literary Impulse, Louisiana State University Press, 1975

=== Editor ===
- Shaw and Woman, The Shaw Review, January 1974
- Fabian Feminist Bernard Shaw and Woman, Pennsylvania State University Press, 1977
- Shaw Abroad, Shaw 5, Pennsylvania State University Press, 1985
- Captain Brassbound's Conversion volume of Bernard Shaw Early texts: play manuscripts in facsimile, Garland Publishing, Inc., 1981
- Bernard Shaw “Arms and the Man”, Penguin Classic 2006

Co-edited with Stanley Weintraub

- Evolution of a Revolt Early Postwar Writings of T. E. Lawrence, Pennsylvania State University Press, 1968
- "Moby-Dick and Seven Pillars of Wisdom" Studies in American Fiction
- "Chapman's Homer" The Classical World, September–October 1973
- Arms and the Man and John Bull's Other Island by George Bernard Shaw, Bantam, 1993
- Misalliance and Heartbreak House by George Bernard Shaw
- Dear Young Friend The Letters of American Presidents to Children, 2000
