= Jacqueline Jung =

American art historian

Jacqueline E. Jung is a Professor in the department of history of art at Yale University.

Jung's first book, The Gothic Screen: Sculpture, Space, and Community in French and German Cathedrals, ca. 1200-1400, received the Samuel and Ronnie Heyman Prize for Outstanding Scholarly Publication at Yale and was a co-winner of the John Nicholas Brown Prize from the Medieval Academy of America. Her second book, Eloquent Bodies: Movement, Expression, and the Human Figure in Gothic Sculpture, received the Gustav Ranis International Book Prize from Yale University's MacMillan Center for International Studies. She has translated several important art historical writings from German, most notably Alois Riegl's Historical Grammar of the Visual Arts (Zone Books, 2004).

== Education ==
- B.A., University of Michigan, 1993
- M.A., Columbia University, 1995
- Ph.D., Columbia University, 2002

== Selected publications ==
- Eloquent Bodies: Movement, Expression, and the Human Figure in Gothic Sculpture. New Haven: Yale University Press, 2020.
- The Gothic Screen: Space, Sculpture, and Community in the Cathedrals of France and Germany, ca. 1200-1400. Cambridge: Cambridge University Press, 2013.
- "The Work of Gothic Sculpture in the Age of its Photographic Reproduction," in The Lives and Afterlives of Medieval Iconography, ed. Pamela A. Patton and Henry Schilb, University Park, Penn.: Pennsylvania State University Press, 2021, pp. 161–94.
- "France, Germany, and the Historiography of Gothic Sculpture," in A Companion to Medieval Art: Romanesque and Gothic in Northern Europe, 2nd expanded edition, ed. Conrad Rudolph, Blackwell, 2019, pp. 513–46.
- "The Boots of St. Hedwig: Thoughts on the Limits of the Agency of Things," in The Agency of Things in Medieval and Early Modern Art: Materials, Power and Manipulation, ed. Grażyna Jurkowlaniec, Ika Matyjaszkiewicz, and Zuzanna Sarnecka, New York: Routledge, 2018, pp. 173–96.
- "The Medieval Choir Screen in Sacred Space: The Dynamic Interiors of Vezzolano and Breisach," British Art Studies, Issue 5 (2017), multimedia presentation accessible at https://doi.org/10.17658/issn.2058-5462/issue-05/jjung.
- "The Kinetics of Gothic Sculpture: Movement and Apprehension in the South Transept of Strasbourg Cathedral and the Chartreuse de Champmol in Dijon," in Mobile Eyes: Peripatetisches Sehen in den Bildkulturen der Vormoderne, ed. David Ganz and Stefan Neuner, Munich: Wilhelm Fink, 2013, pp. 132–63.
- "Die Kluge und Törichte Jungfrauen am Nordquerhaus des Magdeburger Doms und ihre Stelle in der Geschichte der europäischen Kunst," in Der Magdeburger Dom im europäischen Kontext:Beiträge des internationalen wissenschaftlichen Kolloquiums zum 800-jährigen Domjubiläum in Magdeburg vom 1.-4. Oktober 2009, ed. Wolfgang Schenkluhn and Andreas Waschbüsch. Regensburg: Schnell und Steiner, 2011.
- "The Tactile and the Visionary: Notes on the Place of Sculpture in the Medieval Religious Imagination," in Looking Beyond: Visions, Dreams, and Insights in Medieval Art and History, ed. Colum Hourihane. Princeton: Index of Christian Art, 2010, pp. 203–40.
- "Crystalline Wombs and Pregnant Hearts: The Exuberant Bodies of the Katharinenthal Visitation Group," in History in the Comic Mode: Medieval Communities and the Matter of Person, ed. Rachel Fulton and Bruce W. Holsinger. New York: Columbia University Press, 2007.
