= Richard Selzer =

American surgeon and author

Selzer in 2000

Allen Richard Selzer (June 24, 1928 – June 15, 2016) was an American surgeon and author.

== Biography ==
He was born in Troy, New York, and raised there. His father was Julius Louis Selzer, a general practitioner who practiced from the ground floor of the family home at Fifth Avenue in Troy. His mother, Gertrude Schneider Selzer, was an amateur singer who performed in local productions of musicals and opera. Richard Selzer graduated from Union College in 1948, with a B.S. and received his M.D. from Albany Medical College in 1953. He served in the Army for two years as a lieutenant in charge of a medical detachment. In 1960, following a surgical internship and residency at Yale University, he joined the faculty of Yale as a professor of surgery, where he remained until his retirement in 1985. Beginning in the 1970s, Selzer became well known as an author as well.

Selzer's books are generally collections of short stories, essays, and memoirs, including selections from his massive diary. But Imagine a Woman consists entirely of fiction, and he has written two full-length memoirs, Raising the Dead, and Down from Troy: A Doctor Comes of Age. With author and friend Peter Josyph, Selzer published a kind of spoken autobiography, What One Man Said to Another: Talks with Richard Selzer, which has also been recorded as a Blackstone audiobook with Josyph reading the part of Selzer and actor Raymond Todd reading the part of Josyph. Josyph also edited and illustrated a collection of Selzer's correspondence with him, called Letters to A Best Friend. Among Selzer's last books are Diary, which consists entirely of entries from the journal he has kept religiously for decades, and Knife Song Korea, a novel based on his experiences as a young surgeon in the U.S. Army in a remote Korean village after the close of the Korean War. The novel won three prizes for literary fiction.

Selzer died in North Branford, Connecticut, on June 15, 2016, nine days shy of his eighty-eighth birthday. He was preceded in death by his father (in 1941), mother (in 1987), and his brother, William Ephraim Selzer (in 2009). The surviving members of his family included his wife of 61 years, Janet White Selzer, and their three children: sons Jonathan (Regine) and Larry (Rossi), and daughter Gretchen (Donna); as well as seven grandchildren: Becky, Hank, Emily, Lucy, Ned, Danny, and Ellie.

== Published works ==
Among his published books are:

- Rituals of Surgery (1974)
- Mortal Lessons: Notes on the Art of Surgery (1976); Selzer, Richard (April 15, 1996). 1996 pbk edition. ISBN 0-15-600400-3.
- Confessions of a Knife (1979)
- Letters to a Young Doctor (1982); Selzer, Richard (November 18, 1996). 1996 pbk edition. Houghton Mifflin Harcourt. ISBN 0-15-600399-6; with a new preface by the author
- Taking the World in for Repairs (1986)
- Imagine a Woman (1990)
- Down from Troy: A Doctor Comes of Age (1992; autobiography)
- Raising the Dead: A Doctor's Encounter with His Own Mortality (1993)
- What One Man Said to Another: Talks with Richard Selzer (1994; with Peter Josyph)
- The Doctor Stories (1998) ISBN 0-312-20403-5
- The Exact Location of the Soul: New and Selected Essays (2001)
- The Whistler's Room: Stories and Essays (2004)
- Knife Song Korea: A novel (2009)
- Letters to a Best Friend (2009; with Peter Josyph)
- Diary (2010)
- A Richard Selzer Reader: Blood and Ink (2017, editor Kevin Kerrane)

== Selzer Prize for Writing ==
In 2010, The Abaton, a medical humanities literary and arts journal produced by Des Moines University, awarded the inaugural Selzer Prize for Writing. The award was created to honor Selzer for his contribution to the medical humanities and medical profession as a whole. The award is given annually to a medical student whose essay or story stands out for its quality and humanistic focus.

== Interviews and profiles ==
Interviews, portraits, and profiles of Selzer include:

- Faulkner, Donald W. “Richard Selzer, Physician/Writer: A Profile.” Medical Heritage 1.1 (Jan/Feb 1985): 12–9.
- Flynn, Dale. "Rituals of Writing: An Interview with Richard Selzer." Writing on the Edge 2.l (Fall 1990): 57–68.
- Josyph, Peter. "Wounded with Wonder: A Talk with Richard Selzer." Studies in Short Fiction 27 (Summer 1990): 321 28.
- Kushner, Thomasine. "Richard Selzer on Death, Resurrection, and Compassion." Cambridge Quarterly Healthcare Ethics 4.4 (BYC) (Fall 1995): 494–8.
- Middleton, Faith. “A Surgeon’s Conscience.” Hartford-Courant Northeast. August 28, 1993: 30–33.
- Poirier, Suzanne. "The Physician and Authority: Portraits by Four Physician Writers." Literature and Medicine 2 (1983): 21 40.
- Steinberg, Sybil S. "Richard Selzer: The Surgeon/Writer Reflects on Youth in the Depression and His Two Careers." Publishers Weekly 239.36 (10 Aug. 1992): 48–9.
- Stripling, Mahala Yates. “The Surgeon Storyteller: A Last Interview with Richard Selzer.” Hektoen International: A Journal of Medical Humanities 4.2 (Summer 2012).

== Literature and medicine movement ==
"It was Richard Selzer," according to Rita Charon, founder of the Narrative Medicine Program at Columbia University's College of Physicians and Surgeons, "who was among the first physicians to understand the power of writing and reading fiction within medicine. He helped to open up this whole territory to those of us who came after." Proliferating programs, also known as Health Humanities; Medicine, Literature, and Society; Bioethics and Humanities, et al. draw from the evolving canon of literature and medicine, which is now used in two-thirds of the 171 medical schools in the United States, with Selzer's stories and essays being a mainstay of the curriculum.

== Bioethics in literature ==
Selzer wrote a 1976 Esquire essay, "What I Saw at the Abortion"; he drew readers into the fetus’ consciousness, which sparked fiery and divergent reactions. His engagement with public issues continued in the 1990 Redbook story, "Follow Your Heart," showing how organ transplants can tear one family apart and heal another, emotionally and spiritually. His 1991 essay in The New York Times, "A Question of Mercy", describes how he was drawn into a mercy killing situation at a time well before Jack Kevorkian made physician-assisted suicide a subject of heated national debate. The attempt was botched because Selzer, fearful as he was of being charged with murder, could not be there to administer the final lethal dose. Selzer's exploration into the question of autonomy over the body continues to resonate in our culture today, with his literature bringing richer shades of truth than the political discourse allows. When Leon Kass, Chairman of the President's Council on Bioethics, included four of Selzer's pieces in the 2003 anthology Being Human: Readings from the President's Council on Bioethics, it underscored Kass's view of Selzer: "A man who lives with a knife, has his hands on organs, but preserves wonder and awe, is special."

== Teacher of medicine and literature ==
Beginning in the 1950s, when he was in private practice and an assistant clinical professor at what is now the Yale School of Medicine, until 1985, Selzer was a voluntary medical school faculty member.

He mentored aspiring writers, such as Erich Segal and John Irving, and held a medical student writing workshop at Yale from the early 1980s until 2011, when Lorence Gutterman took over. After retiring from medicine, he taught at such places as Rensselaer Polytechnic Institute in Troy, New York, and Sarah Lawrence College in Bronxville, New York.

== Plays, art critiques, medical readers’ theater, and dance ==
After retiring from medicine, Selzer wrote a play, The Black Swan, based on his short story. It was produced in St. Louis in 1994. Playwright David Rabe adapted Selzer's "A Question of Mercy" into a 1998 play performed at the Long Wharf Theater in New Haven, CT. Selzer became an art critic, lecturing on "The Ivory Crucifixion," "Rothko's #3 Red," and The Veteran and St. Peter, first at Yale Art Gallery and then in 1998 at The Cooper Union School of Architecture in New York. They are published in Selzer's The Whistler's Room (2004).

Medical Readers’ Theater (2002), edited by Todd Savitt, contains the scripts for "Fetishes," "Imelda," and "Follow Your Heart." Selzer's stories, "Sarcophagus," "Fetishes," "Imelda," "Whither Thou Goest," and "Atrium," from The Doctor Stories became a theatrical event in 2003 at the University of Colorado, Denver, adapted in collaboration with playwright Kathryn G. Maes. Selzer acted his own part. In 2011 "Diary of an Infidel," a semiautobiographical story about Selzer's time at San Giorgio monastery, across the lagoon from Venice, became a staged reading scripted by Ed Lynch and performed at the Yale Art Gallery. It doubled as a moving tribute to Selzer.

A ballet adaptation of Selzer's short story "Luis," made by playwright Eric Coble and choreographer Mark Tomasic of Verb Ballets, was performed in 2006 at the International Festival of Literature and Medicine, commissioned by Hiram College Center for Literature, Medicine, and Biomedical Humanities, et al. It is a dark fairytale about a scavenger in a Peruvian dump who thinks he has found a fallen star, which is instead radioactive material.

== Legacy ==
When asked about his legacy, his quick reply was, "Well, my children and grandchildren, of course." He admitted that his work was read, somewhere, all over the world. "I don’t mean to do it. I just want to write. But people respond to the power of literature. It's a dangerous thing: you can sway people by the power of language and make them do things according to your will. I don’t want to do that. But my work, written decades ago, is used in some anthology or collection, and I have discovered that things I say are counted on by some people today" (Selzer to Stripling).

== Honors, fellowships, and awards ==
- Columbia School of Journalism National Magazine Award (1975) for Esquire essays
- Pushcart Prize for Fiction, 1982-3 Mercy and Witness
- American Medical Writer's Assn. Book Award (1983) for Letters to a Young Doctor
- Yaddo Residencies (10), from 1977 to 1992
- Rockefeller Foundation, Bellagio Study Center Fellowship, 1979
- Guggenheim Foundation Fellowship, 1985–6
- National Endowment for the Arts Fellowship, 1988
- Pen/Faulkner Award for Fiction, semi-finalist, The Doctor Stories 1998
- The Richard Selzer Lecture, Yale Program for the Humanities in Medicine
- Knife Song Korea (2009), finalist in Fiction & Literature (Literary Fiction category of the "Best Books 2010" Awards, sponsored by USA Book News); silver medalist in 2010 Independent Publishers Book Award in Literary Fiction; 2009 Editor's Choice Award for Fiction by Foreword Magazine
- The Selzer Prize for Writing, Des Moines University, 2010 (see above)
- Honorary degrees (13), including from his alma maters, Union College (1981) and Albany Medical College (1984)
- Contributing Editor: Literature and Medicine, Bellevue Literary Review, Mediphors (A Literary Journal of the Health Humanities), et al.
