= Douglas A. Brooks =

American Shakespeare scholar (1956–2009)

Douglas A. Brooks (1956 – January 27, 2009) was a noted Shakespeare scholar. He was an associate professor of English at Texas A&M University and wrote on early modern English literature. He is noted not only by his publications but also his editorship of The Shakespeare Yearbook.

== Selected publications ==
- Brooks, D. A. (2000). From playhouse to printing house: Drama and authorship in early modern England. Cambridge: Cambridge University Press.
- Brooks Douglas A. (2005) Printing and Parenting in Early Modern England
- Brooks, D. A. (2008). Milton and the Jews. Cambridge: Cambridge University Press.
