= Journal of International Commercial Law and Technology =

- Discipline: International law, technology, trade law, commercial law, business law, law review, insurance law, computer law
- Language: English

Publication details
- History: 2006-2015
- Publisher: International Association of IT Lawyers
- Open access: Yes

Standard abbreviations
- ISO 4: J. Int. Commer. Law Technol.

Indexing
- ISSN: 1901-8401

Links
- Journal homepage

The Journal of International Commercial Law and Technology was a peer-reviewed open access academic journal covering international commercial law and technology. It was published between 2006, until 2015 by the International Association of IT Lawyers. The journal's quarterly publications were in an online format, and were peer-reviewed and open-access. The editor-in-chief was Sylvia Kierkegaard.
