= Jakelin Troy =

Australian linguist

Jakelin Troy FASSA FRSN
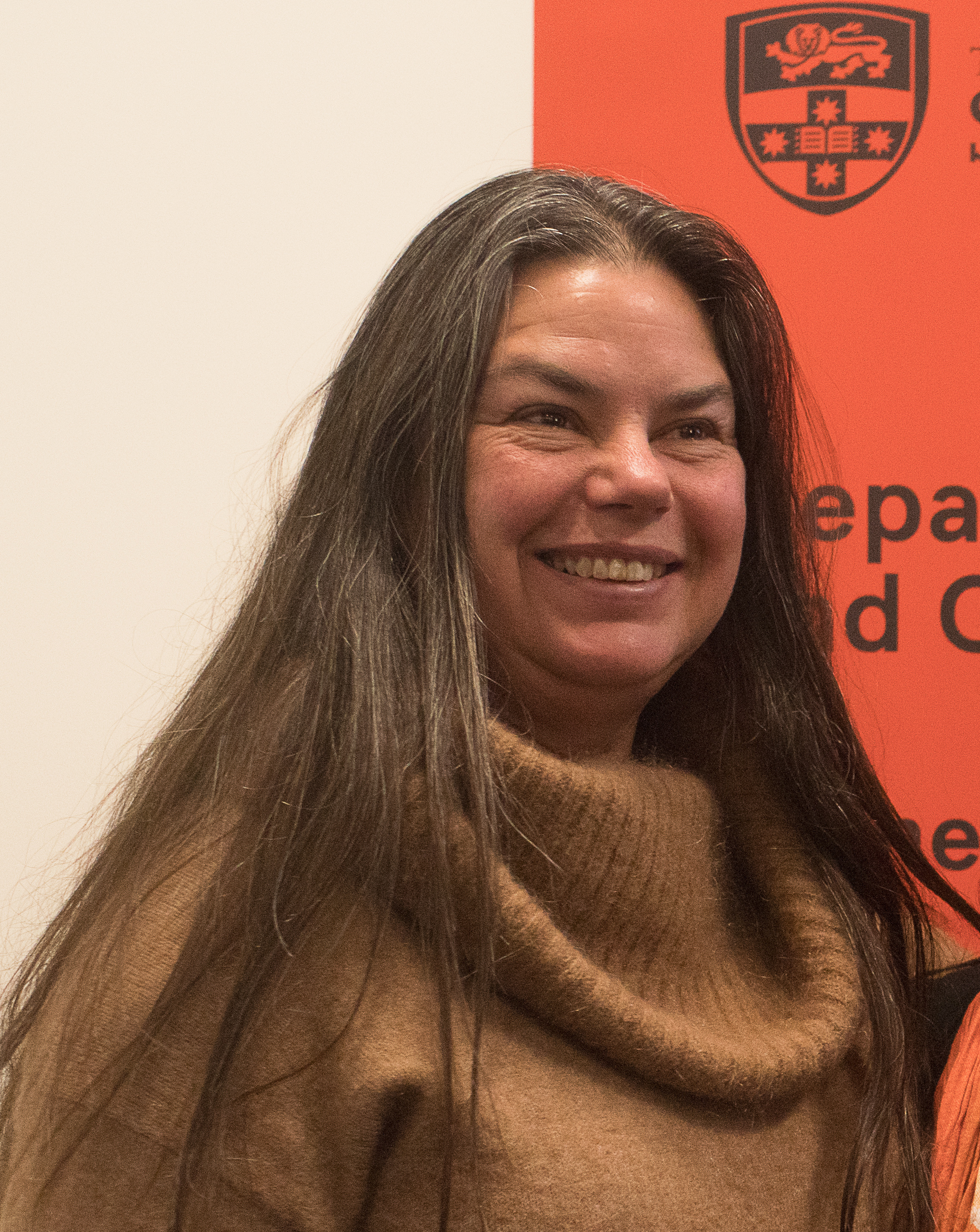
- Jakelin Troy in 2019
- Born: Jakelin Fleur Troy; 1960 (age 65–66)
- Occupations: Linguist and sociologist

Academic background
- Education: University of Sydney BA (Hons); University of Canberra GradDipEd
- Alma mater: Australian National University PhD 1994
- Thesis: Melaleuka : a history and description of New South Wales pidgin

Academic work
- Institutions: University of Sydney
- Main interests: Language revival, Aboriginal languages, history, and culture
- Notable works: The Sydney Language (1994)

Jakelin Fleur Troy FASSA FRSN (born 1960) is an Australian linguist and sociologist, and academic, as of August 2024 Director, Aboriginal and Torres Strait Islander Research at the University of Sydney. She is known for her 1994 work, The Sydney Language.

== Early life and education ==
Troy was born in 1960 and grew up mainly in Sydney's Northern Beaches, around Narrabeen, but also travelled around Australia. As a young child she spent a year in Arnhem Land in the Northern Territory with her father. Her origins are in the Ngarigu people of the Snowy Mountains in southern New South Wales, and her mother, who founded a ski club in Thredbo, took her to the mountains regularly, especially Tumut. She loved horses and continues to ride.

She received a first-class honours BA degree from the University of Sydney, and then did a GradDipEducation at the University of Canberra.

In 1994 she wrote her doctoral thesis about the origin and development "New South Wales Pidgin", the first pidgin English language in Australia. It was titled "Melaleuka: a history and description of New South Wales pidgin" at the Australian National University.

== Career ==
Troy's work has focused on documenting and reviving Aboriginal Australian languages, but she also works with other indigenous languages and cultures. In 1994 she published The Sydney Language, about the language spoken by the Dharug people of the Sydney area before colonisation. It includes word lists of Dharug / Darug words with their English equivalents.

She worked for the New South Wales Board of Studies, where she began writing what later became the Aboriginal Languages Syllabus K-10, which was implemented in 2005, "the first schools syllabus in Australia to support the teaching of all the languages of a state or territory". She later helped to write, along with Michael Walsh and Doug Marmion, the Framework for Aboriginal Languages and Torres Strait Islander Languages, which was to become part of the languages national curriculum. She is passionate about language revival.

She authored an essay in and co-edited the volume Everywhen: Australia and the Language of Deep History (University of Nebraska, 2023), with Ann McGrath and Laura Rademaker.

As of August 2024 she is director of Aboriginal and Torres Strait Islander Research and a professor of linguistics at the University of Sydney. Recent research interests include Indigenous languages of Pakistan, including Saraiki and Torwali. She is involved with Australian Research Council Discovery Projects: one with John Maynard on the history of Aboriginal missions and reserves in eastern Australia, and about Aboriginal people who were not institutionalised; and the other about the practice of "corroboree" by Aboriginal people in the mid-20th century.

== Other activities ==
Troy was editor-in-chief of Ab-Original: Journal of Indigenous Studies and First Nations and First Peoples' Cultures, published by Penn State University Press in the United States. The first issue was published in 2017, but as of 2023 appears to be archived.

She is part of a team working to revise the Australian Dictionary of Biography to include Indigenous biographies at the National Centre for Biography at the ANU College of Arts and Social Sciences.

She is also a member of the Charles Perkins Centre, the Sydney Centre for Healthy Societies, and the Sydney Environment Institute, based at Sydney University.

She has frequently been published or quoted in major newspapers and websites such as The Guardian The Sydney Morning Herald, SBS News, The Conversation, and ABC News, as well as featuring on ABC Local Radio and Radio National.

== Recognition and awards ==
In 2019, Troy was named as one of Australian Financial Review's 100 Women of Influence.

She was elected a Fellow of the Academy of the Social Sciences in Australia in 2022 and Fellow of the Royal Society of New South Wales in 2025.

== Selected works ==
- The Sydney Language (1994)
- Music, Dance and the Archive (Co-editor, with Amanda Harris and Linda Barwick; Sydney University Press, 2022)
- Everywhen: Australia and the Language of Deep History (Co-editor, with Ann McGrath and Laura Rademaker; University of Nebraska, 2023)

== Personal life ==
Jakelin has an adult daughter. As of 2023, she was living in the house where her grandmother used to live.
