= Private law =

Civil legal system involving relationships between individuals

Private law is the part of a legal system that governs interactions between individual persons. It is distinguished from public law, which deals with relationships between both natural and artificial persons (i.e., organizations) and the state, including regulatory statutes, penal law and other law that affects the public order. In general terms, private law involves interactions between private individuals, whereas public law involves interrelations between the state and the general population. In legal systems of the civil law tradition, it is that part of the jus commune that involves relationships between individuals, such as the law of contracts and torts (as it is called in the common law tradition), and the law of obligations (as it is called in the civil law tradition).

== History ==
One of the five capital lawyers in Roman law, Domitius Ulpianus, (170–223) – who differentiated ius publicum from ius privatum – the European, more exactly the continental law, philosophers and thinkers want(ed) to put each branch of law into this dichotomy: Public and Private Law. "huius studdii duæ sunt positiones: publicum et privatum. Publicum ius est, quod statum rei Romanæ spectat, privatum, quod ad singulorum utilitatem; sunt enim quædam publice utila, quædam privatim". (Public law is that which concerns the Roman state; private law is concerned with the interests of citizens.)

The plebiscite lex Aquilia codified the law on damage to person and property through a particular fault. It is a forerunner of the modern law of tort. Other forms of private law included:

- Stipulatio: the basic form of contract in Roman law. It was formatted as a question and an answer. The precise nature of the contract was disputed, as shown below.
- Rei vindicatio: a legal action by which the plaintiff demands that the defendant return a thing that belongs to the plaintiff. It may be used only when the plaintiff owns the thing and the defendant is somehow impeding the plaintiff's possession of it. The plaintiff could also institute an actio furti (a personal action) to punish the defendant. If the thing could not be recovered, the plaintiff could claim damages from the defendant with the aid of the condictio furtiva (a personal action). With the aid of the actio legis Aquiliae (a personal action), the plaintiff could claim damages from the defendant. Rei vindicatio was derived from the ius civile, therefore was only available to Roman citizens.

In the modern era, Charles-Louis Montesquieu (1689–1755) amplified supremely this distinction: International (law of nations), Public (politic law) and Private (civil law) Law, in his major work: (On) The Spirit of the Law (1748). "Considered as inhabitants of so great a planet, which necessarily contains a variety of nations, they have laws relating to their mutual intercourse, which is what we call the law of nations. As members of a society that must be properly supported, they have laws relating to the governors and the governed, and this we distinguish by the name of politic law. They have also another sort of law, as they stand in relation to each other; by which is understood the civil law."

== Private law in common law jurisdictions ==
The concept of private law in common law countries is somewhat broader, as it also encompasses private relationships between governments and individuals or other entities. In other words, relationships between governments and individuals governed by contract or tort law are private-law relationships and fall outside the scope of public law.

== European Union law ==
The European Commission and the European Council have stated a desire to achieve greater approximation of private law across its (now) 27 member states of the European Union, including within the fields of contract law, property law, and family law. Regarding contract law, it the Commission and Council have argued that there are problems resulting from divergences in this field of law across the EU, and regarding family law, the Council suggests that this field is "a possible subject for a discussion on ... approximation".

== Areas of private law ==
- Agricultural law
- Business law
  - Company law
  - Commercial law
- Civil law
  - Law of obligations
    - Contract law
    - Tort law
    - Law of unjust enrichment and quasi-contracts
  - Trust law
  - Law of agency
  - Property law
  - Family law – family-related issues and domestic relations, including marriage, civil unions, divorce, spousal abuse, child custody and visitation, property, alimony, and child support awards, child abuse issues, and adoption.
  - Succession – estate planning, testate and intestate succession, probate, and law of wills
- Consumer protection
- International private law
- Labour law
- Some aspects of transport law, for example contracts of carriage

== See also ==
- International Institute for the Unification of Private Law
- International Journal of Private Law
- Polycentric law
- Private law society
- Privatus
- Social law
