= Peter Josyph =

American artist, author, filmmaker

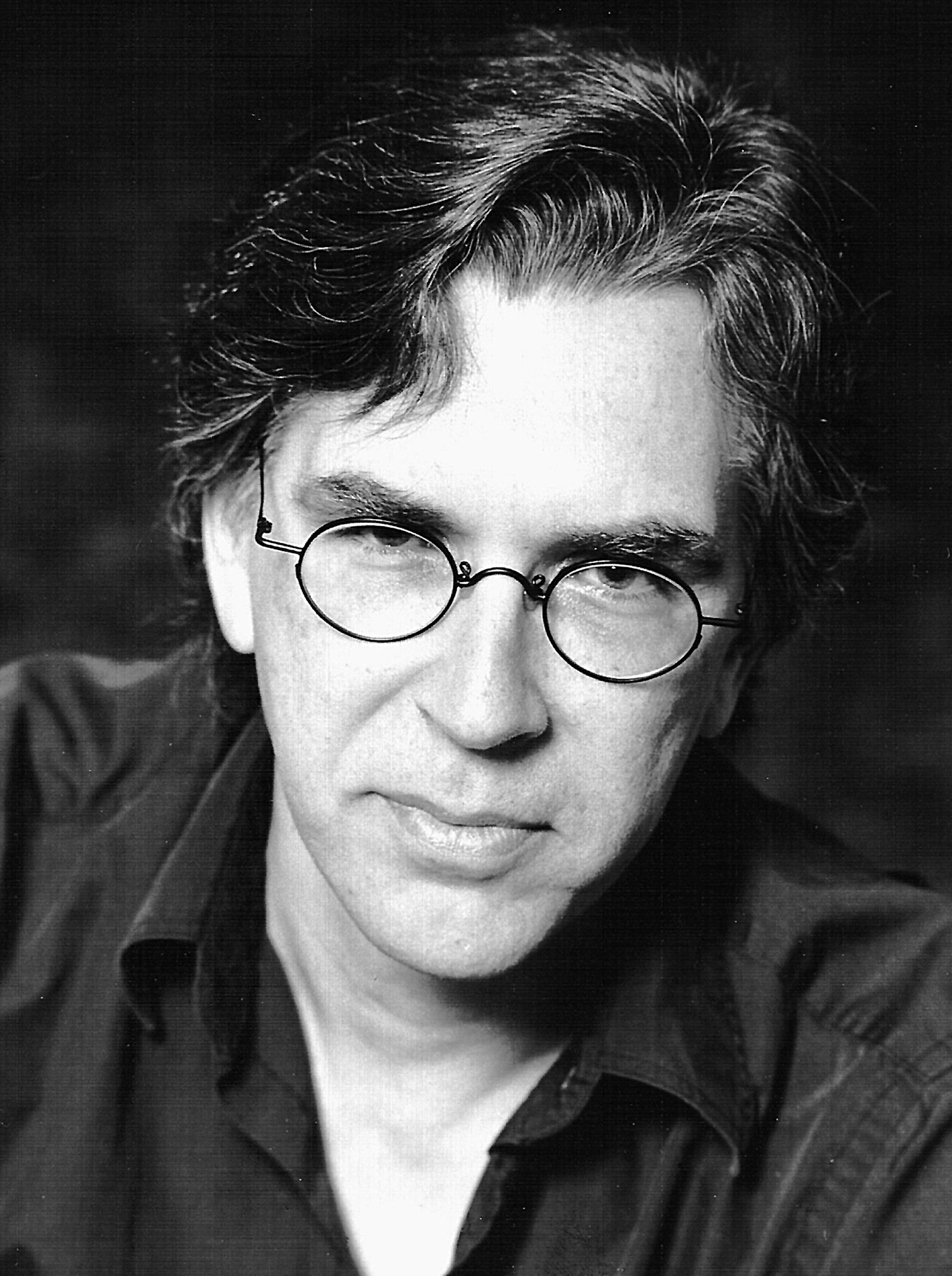
Peter Josyph

Peter Josyph is a New York artist who works concurrently as an author, a painter, an actor-director, a filmmaker, and a photographer.

== Writing life ==
As an author of literary non-fiction, Peter Josyph has written five books tributing novelist Cormac McCarthy; two books of eyewitness encounters in the aftermath of the 9/11 attacks in Lower Manhattan; a book of conversations with surgeon-author Richard Selzer, as well as a book of Selzer's correspondence with him; and ongoing chronicles, in essay and conversation, of his association with jazz composer and trumpet player Tim Hagans. He has co-authored, with John Lutz, a book of conversations about Shakespeare's The Merchant of Venice. In fiction, he has written a series of novels and short stories in which the narrator is French painter Henri Matisse, two of which have been published by Ivesian Arts Publishing, and the Haiku Quintet, a series of semi-autobiographical haiku novels. He is also a playwright and screenwriter.

Peter Josyph is the editor of The Wounded River: The Civil War Letters of John Vance Lauderdale, M.D. (MSU Press, 1993), which was featured in American Heritage and was a New York Times Notable Book of 1993. Josyph edited, illustrated, and wrote the preface for Letters to A Best Friend (SUNY Press, 2009), a selection of Richard Selzer’s correspondence with him. He wrote the preface for the MSU paperback of Selzer's Taking the World in for Repairs, and the afterword for the SUNY Press edition of Selzer's Down from Troy, which he also illustrated.

Josyph's fiction, personal essays, criticism and interviews have appeared in a variety of journals and anthologies, including Lapham's Quarterly, Chelsea, Newsday, The Southern Quarterly, Salmagundi, The Bloomsbury Review, Library Journal, Twentieth Century Literature, Medical Humanities Review, Journal of Medical Humanities, The Arden, MD, Year One, Paragraph, Antipodes, Southwest American Literature, Studies in Short Fiction, The Cormac McCarthy Journal, and New York Stories. His work has been anthologized in High on the Downs: A Festschrift for Harry Guest; You Would Not Believe What Watches: Suttree and Cormac McCarthy's Knoxville; Sacred Violence: A Reader’s Companion to Cormac McCarthy; Myth, Legend, Dust: Critical Responses to Cormac McCarthy; the Four-Way Reader # 1; Interdisciplinary and Intertextual Approaches to Cormac McCarthy: Borders and Crossings; and Cormac McCarthy's Borders and Landscapes. His memoir Strictly 53rd Street appears as a booklet in the Grammy-nominated jazz CD The Avatar Sessions (Fuzzy Music, 2010), featuring the music of trumpeter/composer Tim Hagans, with whom Josyph also performs in duets for trumpet and haiku based on Josyph's series of haiku novels, the Haiku Quartet, consisting of: The Way of the Trumpet, London Journal, Stockholm, and Heroin Days. The Way of the Trumpet was nominated for the 2013 Warwick Prize for Writing.

Josyph's fourth collection of essays and conversations about Cormac McCarthy, Cormac McCarthy's Last Outlaws: The Counselor and the Passenger, was published by McFarland, and his most recent tribute to McCarthy, Glanton's Horse, was published by Ivesian Arts Publishing.

== Lectures ==
Josyph has lectured in the Program for Humanities in Medicine at Yale University; as a regular keynoter for the Cormac McCarthy Society; for the department of American Studies at the University of Miami; for the English, Cinema, Theatre, and Mass Communications Departments, and for the Alumni Association, at Texas Tech; for the Civil War Roundtable; for the State University of New York at Stony Brook; for Alma College in Michigan; for Berea College in Kentucky; for the New York Council for the Humanities; for the Writing and Society Research Centre at the University of Western Sydney; for the Witlliff Collections at Texas State University-San Marcos; for Hutton House at LIU Post; and as a virtual speaker on Creative Non-Fiction at the University of Colorado at Boulder, and for the CAPITAL Centre at the University of Warwick, England. Josyph has been a resident of the Djerassi Foundation; the Helene Wurlitzer Foundation; Centrum Foundation; the Millay Colony; the Virginia Center for the Creative Arts; the John Steinbeck Room; the Alden B. Dow Creativity Center; the Hawthornden Castle International Retreat for Writers (Scotland); and he has been a Knight Fellow at Yaddo. He held a talk on Cormac McCarthy at the Wittliff Collections. He has hosted seminars on film for adults at Hutton House Lectures on the campus of LIU Post, at New York Institute of Technology, and currently in the Frick Estate Lectures at Nassau County Museum of Art on Long Island.

== Art and exhibitions ==
For seven years Josyph was artist-in-residence at the Smithtown Township Arts Council, where he won the Partnership Award from the Association of New York Arts Councils and a grant from the New York Commission on the Bicentennial of the U.S. Constitution. His work as a painter has made him a New Yorker Talk of the Town and a Fellow of the Pollock-Krasner Foundation. He has had solo exhibitions in New York; in Texas; in California; in Washington, D.C.; in Baden-Baden and in Heidelberg, Germany, where for two decades his dealer has been Galerie Signum Winfried Heid. Solo exhibitions include the New York State Vietnam Memorial Gallery; the Well of the Legislative Office Building in Albany, New York; the Rotunda of the Canon Office Building of the U.S. House of Representatives in Washington, D.C.; the historic landmark Central Savings Bank (now Apple Bank) on Broadway in Manhattan; the historic landmark Mills Pond House in St. James, New York; and he has exhibited at the New-York Historical Society. His installation of 33 canvases, The Love Letters of Eleanor Rigby and Father McKenzie is currently exhibiting in the lobby of SUNY Optometric College on 42nd Street in Manhattan from January through July 2026.

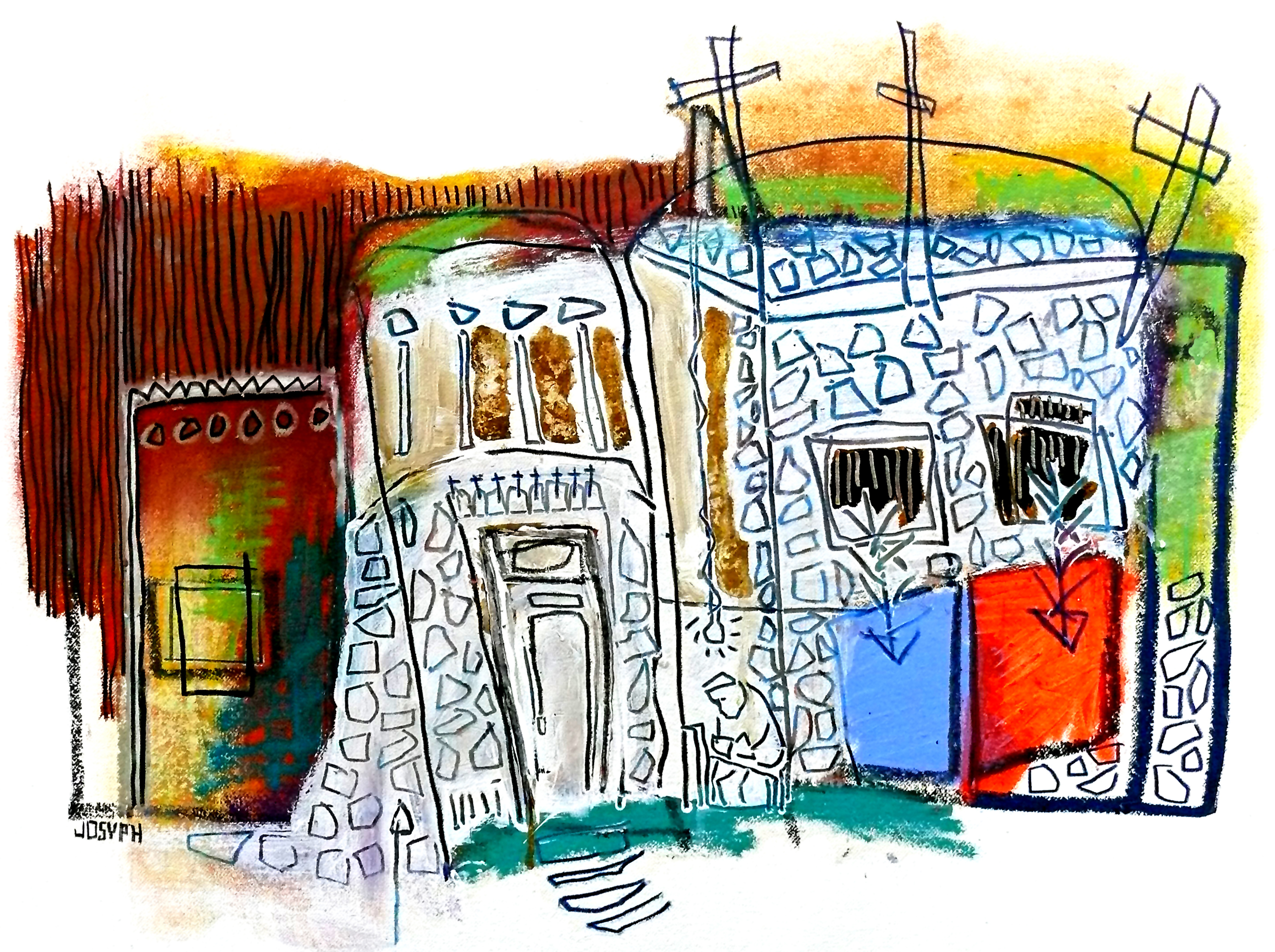
Cormac McCarthy's House by Peter Josyph

Josyph's ongoing series of works on paper, Cormac McCarthy’s House, has exhibited at the Kulturens Hus in Luleå, Sweden; at the CAPITAL Centre in Warwick, England; at the Centennial Museum in El Paso, Texas; and at the Longwall Gallery of the Loyal Jones Appalachian Center in Berea, Kentucky. The series is the subject of a memoir called "Cormac McCarthy’s House" in the book of that title (University of Texas Press), and a film of that title, directed by Peter Josyph and Raymond Todd. His series All the Pretty Horses: A Tribute exhibited at the Loyal Jones Appalachian Center in March – June 2013. His series The Lost Blood Meridian Notebook exhibited in Australia at the historic Female Orphan School of the University of Western Sydney in summer 2014.

Josyph has collaborated with painter Kevin Larkin on numerous exhibitions, such as Portrait of an American Town and, as Josyph & Larkin, an ongoing series of found-object assemblages called Lives of the Saints, which became a major installation in the historic Church of the Advent on Broadway in Manhattan, including a 40-foot altarpiece, St. Jerome in His Study. Their work is the subject of a monograph by Raymond Todd, Josyph and Larkin: X-Men of Art (ImaginArts, 1994). Josyph's monograph, Kevin Larkin: The Genuine Article (emPublishing, 1989), features conversations with Larkin about his work, and Josyph wrote the text for the exhibition catalogues Kevin Larkin: The Immortal Chant ($3 Seat Productions, 2010), and Kevin Larkin: The Justice of Noon ($3 Seat Productions, 2012). He also illustrated two collections of poetry by Larkin: The Immortal Chant ($3 Seat Productions, 2009), and A Portable Man ($3 Seat Productions, 2012). In 2009 Larkin's exhibition The Immortal Chant featured a multimedia installation based around Josyph's memoir Smoking A Picasso. In 2010 Larkin directed an adaptation of Josyph's verse monologues, Book of Thieves, and in 2010 he directed Josyph's A Tell Tale Poe with Raymond Todd as Edgar Allan Poe, and the Hagans/Josyph performance of Josyph's The Way of the Trumpet. In November 2012 Larkin directed Josyph's play The Last Colored Lightbulb in Louisiana at B.J. Spoke in New York. In 2013, Alexander Larkin directed The Last Colored Lightbulb in Louisiana along with Josyph's Of Course December at the Rose Theatre in New York.

Josyph's art and photography have been used on posters, book covers, and CDs, including The Kennedy Suite by the Cowboy Junkies (Latent Recordings, 2013); The Moon Is Waiting by Tim Hagans (Palmetto, 2011); The Avatar Sessions by Tim Hagans (Fuzzy Music, 2010); Close to So Far by the Joe LoCascio Trio (Heart Music, 2002); They Rode On: Blood Meridian and the Tragedy of the American West (Cormac McCarthy Society Press, 2013); You Would Not Believe What Watches: Suttree and Cormac McCarthy's Knoxville (Cormac McCarthy Society Press, 2012); John Sepich's Notes On Blood Meridian (Ballarmine College Press, 1993; rev. University of Texas Press, 2008); and the Portuguese translations, by Paulo Faria, of Cormac McCarthy's Suttree (Relógio D'Água, 2009); Blood Meridian Or the Evening Redness in the West (Relógio D'Água, 2010); The Crossing (Relógio D'Água, 2012); and Child of God (Relógio D'Água, 2014). His photographs and illustrations have been published in the Winter 2011 issue of Appalachian Heritage, in the 2010, 2011, and 2013 issues of The Cormac McCarthy Journal, in the June 2011 issue of the Portuguese literary magazine LER, and in the December 2010 and August 2013 issues of Ipsilon. His photographs of Dallas marking the 50th anniversary of the JFK assassination illustrate articles by Portuguese author Paulo Faria in two November issues of the Lisbon newspaper Publico. In September 2011, to commemorate the 10th anniversary of the September 11 attacks, Josyph's Lost Worlds of September 11, an exhibition of photographs and texts, showed at the Louise Hopkins Underwood Center for the Arts in Lubbock, Texas.

== Films, directing, and performance ==
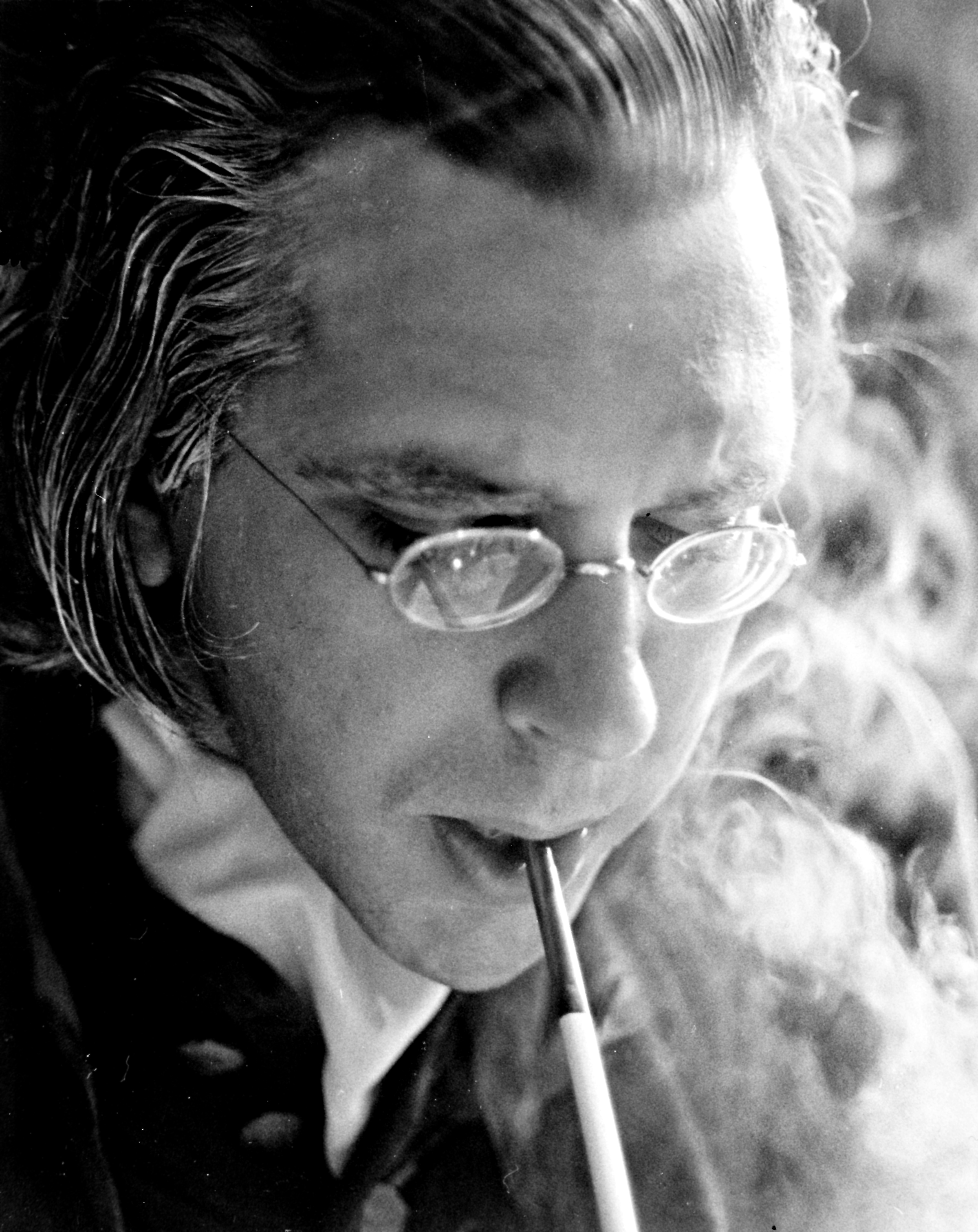
Peter Josyph As Ben Franklin in Benjamin: An Invitation to Private Company at Victory Rep, 1982

For 12 years Josyph was artistic director of Victory Rep in New York, where he wrote fifty plays and where he acted and directed continually. In addition to the plays of Pinter, Chekhov, and Ibsen, Victory Rep performed originals by Josyph and his adaptations of classic American authors such as Mark Twain, Herman Melville, Benjamin Franklin, Edgar Allan Poe, Henry David Thoreau, and surgeon-author Richard Selzer. For two years Josyph played Henry David Thoreau in a one-man play, An Hour at Walden. In January 2014 he played White in Cormac McCarthy's The Sunset Limited at the Weisiger Theatre in Danville, Kentucky, directed by Patrick Kagan-Moore.

Josyph is President of the Board of the Michele Brangwen Dance and Music Ensemble, an innovative company that conjoins live original music with new choreography, dance improvisation, film and spoken word. MBDME has based a series of dances on Josyph's series of large expressionist canvases called Louie's, Key West, and another series of dances on his book of dream poetry called Collapse and Calypso. Josyph directed a series of short films for MBDME's internet channel Artcast, as well as a serial feature called No Standing in St. Petersburg.

In 2001, Josyph co-directed the documentary Acting McCarthy: The Making of Billy Bob Thornton’s All the Pretty Horses (Lost Medallion Productions, 2000), with actors Matt Damon, Bruce Dern, Henry Thomas, Lucas Black, Miriam Colon, Julio Mechoso; screenwriter Ted Tally; DPs Fred Murphy and Barry Markowitz; and director Billy Bob Thornton. The documentary is co-directed with Raymond Todd.

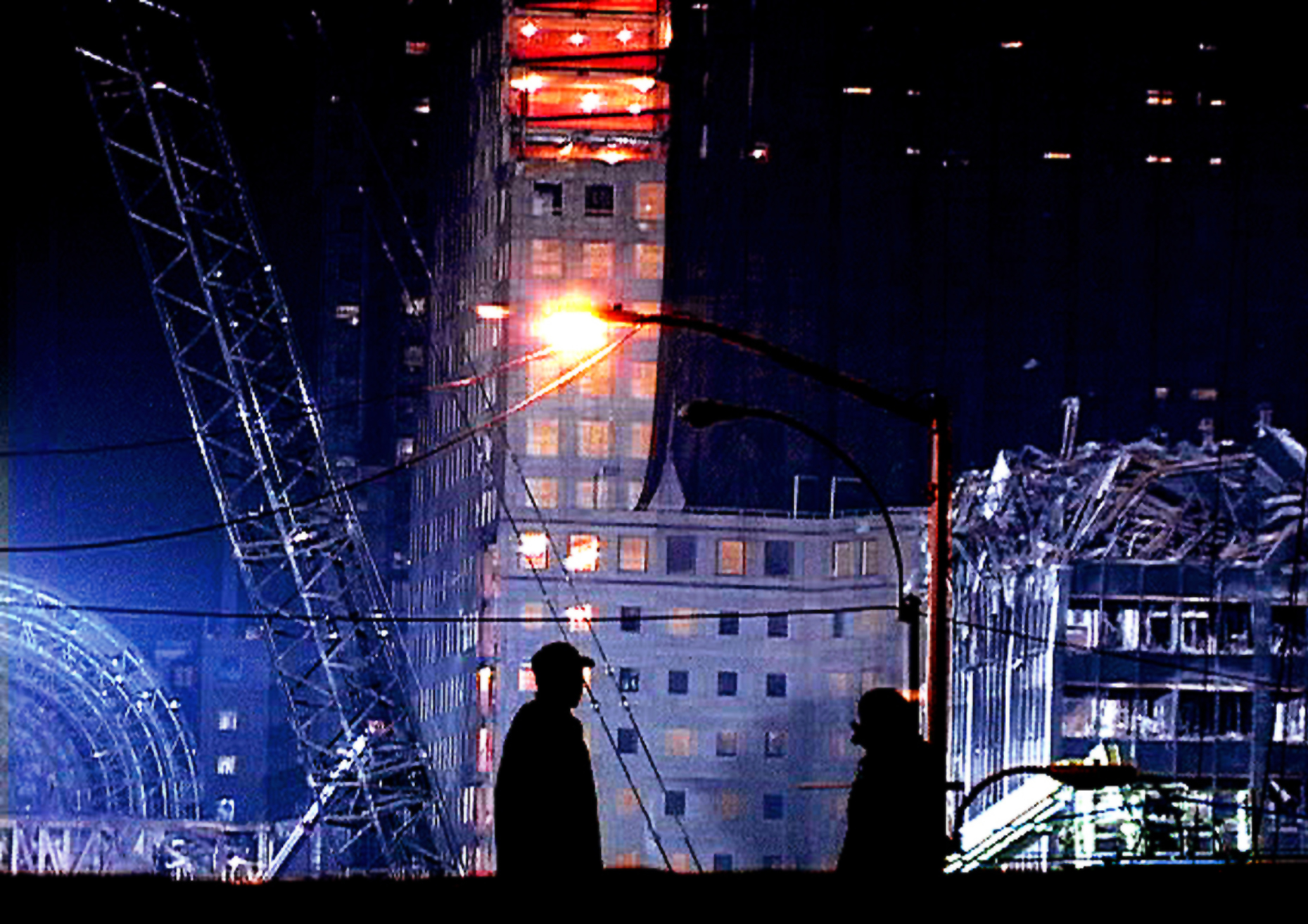
Scene from Peter Josyph's Liberty Street: Alive at Ground Zero

In 2018, Josyph directed the documentary A Few Things Basquiat Did in School (Lost Medallion Productions, 2018), and Shakespeare in New York (Lost Medallion Productions, 2018). Josyph's feature documentary Liberty Street: Alive at Ground Zero (Lost Medallion Productions, 2005) is based on a year and a half of filming in Lower Manhattan after the 9/11 attacks. It won two awards in American film festivals and is a companion to his book Liberty Street: Encounters at Ground Zero. Josyph directed a related short film, I've Got to Go Fix My Flags (Lost Medallion Productions, 2013), also shot at Ground Zero. His film No Standing in St. Petersburg starring Elena A. Shadrina, Anna Istomina, Raymond Todd, and Kevin Larkin, is viewable on his YouTube channel, where he also reads the poetry of Whitman, Keats, Swift, Donne, Blake, Dickinson, and Shakespeare. His film Hell, starring Josyph and Raymond Todd, is also viewable at Josyph's website. His series of jazz films includes G Is Good, a short about night in New York featuring trumpeter Tim Hagans and tabla player Badal Roy; Free With Lee, featuring sax legend Lee Konitz in conversation with Tim Hagans; Man With Saxophone: Lee Konitz Back in Boston, with Lee Konitz and pianist Dan Tepfer; and two tributes to jazz legend Bob Belden: Killer Instinct, and 28 If, both featuring Tim Hagans and other members of the original Animation/Imagination band. Josyph also directed a series of short films featuring the Tim Hagans Quartet called Tim Hagans at Dizzy's.

== Published works ==
- Glanton's Horse (Ivesian Arts Publishing, 2025) ISBN 979-8-218-62291-6
- Cormac McCarthy's Last Outlaws: The Counselor and The Passenger (McFarland, 2025) ISBN 978-1-4766-9871-7
- Me, Matisse (Ivesian Arts Publishing, 2024) ISBN 979-8-218-41425-2
- Matisse and the Life of Crime (Ivesian Arts Publishing, 2023) ISBN 978-0-578-83058-2
- The Wrong Reader's Guide to Cormac McCarthy: All the Pretty Horses (Ivesian Arts Publishing, 2021) ISBN 978-0-578-90712-3
- The Wrong Reader's Guide to Cormac McCarthy: All the Pretty Horses (Priola House, 2018) ASIN BO7B6PDVBR
- Cormac McCarthy's House: Reading McCarthy Without Walls (University of Texas Press, 2013) ISBN 978-0-292-74429-5
- The Way of the Trumpet (Boone's Dock Press, 2012) ASIN B007IK6TBY
- Adventures in Reading Cormac McCarthy (Scarecrow Press, 2010)ISBN 978-0810877078
- Liberty Street: Encounters at Ground Zero (SUNY Press, 2012) ISBN 978-1-4384-4422-2
- Letters to A Best Friend, editor, (SUNY Press, 2009) ISBN 978-1-4384-2722-5
- What One Man Said to Another: Talks With Richard Selzer Unabridged Audiobook (Blackstone, 2002) ASIN B000FIMFPU
- What One Man Said to Another: Talks With Richard Selzer (MSU Press, 1994) ISBN 978-0-87013-362-6
- The Wounded River: The Civil War Letters of John Vance Lauderdale, M.D., editor, (MSU Press, 1993)ISBN 9780870133282
