= Stanley Weintraub =

American historian and biographer (1929–2019)

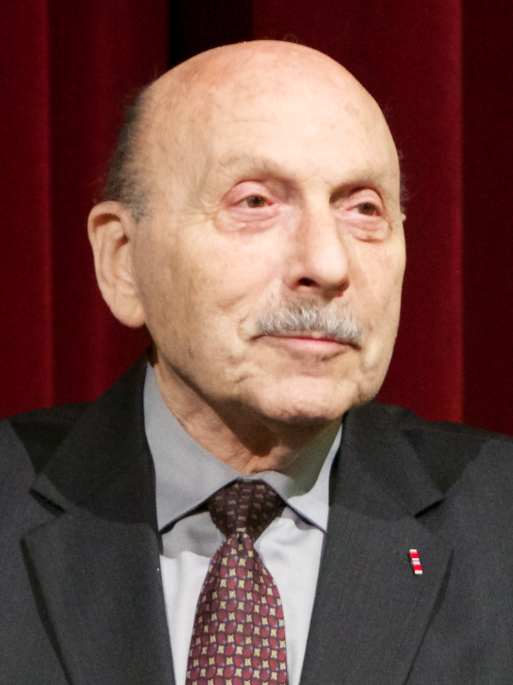
- Weintraub in 2014
- Born: April 17, 1929; Philadelphia, Pennsylvania, U.S.
- Died: July 28, 2019 (aged 90); Jennersville, Pennsylvania, U.S.
- Education: West Chester State Teachers College

Stanley Weintraub (April 17, 1929 – July 28, 2019) was an American historian and biographer and an expert on George Bernard Shaw.

Except for visiting appointments, he remained at Pennsylvania State University ("Penn State") for all of his career, finally attaining the rank of Evan Pugh Professor of Arts and Humanities, with emeritus status on retirement in 2000. From 1970 to 1990 he was also Director of Penn State's Institute for the Arts and Humanistic Studies.

== Early life ==
Weintraub was born in Philadelphia, Pennsylvania, on April 17, 1929. He was the eldest child of Benjamin and Ray Segal Weintraub. He attended South Philadelphia High School, and then he attended West Chester State Teachers College (West Chester University) where he received his B.S. in education in 1949. He continued his education at Temple University where he received his master's degree in English "in absentia," as he was called to duty in the Korean War.

He received a commission in the Army as a second lieutenant, and served with the Eighth Army in Korea, receiving a Bronze Star.

After the war, he enrolled at Pennsylvania State University in September 1953; his doctoral dissertation "Bernard Shaw, Novelist" was accepted on May 6, 1956.

He was a prolific author, who received a festschrift in 1998.

== Personal life ==
He married Rodelle Horwitz in 1954; she also became a Shaw specialist. They had three children, and lived in Newark, Delaware. He died on July 28, 2019, at the age of 90.

== Publications ==
External videos
- Booknotes interview with Weintraub on Disraeli, February 6, 1994, C-SPAN
- Presentation by Weintraub on Uncrowned King, August 28, 1997, C-SPAN
- Washington Journal interview with Weintraub on MacArthur's War, May 23, 2000, C-SPAN
- Presentation by Stanley and Rodelle Weintraub on Dear Young Friend, December 19, 2000, C-SPAN
- Discussion with Weintraub on Silent Night, November 30, 2001, C-SPAN
- Presentation by Weintraub on Iron Tears, June 22, 2005, C-SPAN
- After Words interview with Weintraub on 15 Stars, August 18, 2007, C-SPAN
- Presentation by Weintraub on General Sherman's Christmas, December 2, 2009, C-SPAN
- Presentation by Weintraub on Pearl Harbor Christmas, January 24, 2012, C-SPAN
- Presentation by Weintraub on Final Victory, July 11, 2012, C-SPAN
- Presentation by Weintraub on Young Mr. Roosevelt, November 3, 2013, C-SPAN

- Private Shaw and Public Shaw: A Dual Portrait of Arabia and G. B. S.. London: Braziller, 1963. OCLC 394619
- The Yellow Book, Quintessence of the Nineties. Ed. with an introd. by Stanley Weintraub. Garden City, NY: Doubleday, 1964. OCLC 351035
- The Art of William Golding (with Bernard S. Oldsey). New York: Harcourt, Brace & World, 1965.
- Reggie: a Portrait of Reginald Turner. New York: Braziller, 1965. OCLC 1165471
- The Savoy: Nineties Experiment. University Park: Pennsylvania State University Press, 1966. OCLC 369413
- Beardsley: A Biography. London: Braziller, 1967. OCLC 517295 Received National Book Award nomination in 1967 2nd, revised edition. 1972. ISBN 0140215557. LCCN 73161896.
- The Last Great Cause: The Intellectuals and the Spanish Civil War. New York: Weybright & Talley, 1968. OCLC 437500
- Journey to Heartbreak; the Crucible Years of Bernard Shaw, 1914–1918. New York: Weybright & Talley, 1971. OCLC 154871
- Journey to Heartbreak: The Crucible Years of Bernard Shaw. New York: Weybright & Talley, 1971. Received the George Freedley Award from the American Theatre Library Association in 1971.
- Directions in Literary Criticism; Contemporary Approaches to Literature. Ed. by Stanley Weintraub & Philip Young. University Park: Pennsylvania State University Press, 1973. ISBN 0-271-01116-5 OCLC 609168
- Saint Joan: Fifty Years After, 1923/24-1973/74. Baton Rouge: Louisiana State University Press, 1973. ISBN 0-8071-0208-3 OCLC 737250
- Whistler: A Biography. New York: Weybright & Talley, 1974. ISBN 0-679-40099-0 OCLC 821038
- Lawrence of Arabia:The Literary Impulse. With Rodelle Weintraub. Baton Rouge: Louisiana State University Press, 1975. ISBN 0-8071-0152-4 OCLC 1991924
- Aubrey Beardsley: Imp of the Perverse. University Park: Pennsylvania State University Press, 1976. ISBN 0-271-01215-3 OCLC 2118568
- War in the Wards: Korea's Unknown Battle in a Prisoner-of-war Hospital Camp. 2d ed. San Rafael, CA: Presidio Press, 1976. OCLC 1349913
- The Portable Bernard Shaw. New York : Penguin, 1977, 1986.
- Four Rossettis: a Victorian Biography. New York: Weybright & Talley, 1977. ISBN 0-679-40136-9 OCLC 2318460
- The London Yankees: Portraits of American Writers and Artists in London, 1894–1914. New York: Harcourt, 1979. ISBN 0-15-152978-7 OCLC 4835286 Received the Freedoms Foundation Award in 1980
- Modern British Dramatists, 1900–1945. Dictionary of Literary Biography: Vol. 10. Detroit: Gale Research, 1982. ISBN 0-8103-0937-8 OCLC 7947395
- The Unexpected Shaw: Biographical Approaches to George Bernard Shaw and His Work. New York: Ungar, 1982. ISBN 0-8044-2974-X OCLC 8729615
- British Dramatists since World War II. Dictionary of Literary Biography: Vol. 13. Detroit: Gale Research, 1982. ISBN 0-8103-0936-X OCLC 8195676
- A Stillness Heard Round the World: the End of the Great War, November 1918. London : Allen & Unwin, 1986. American ed. published by E. P. Dutton. ISBN 0-525-24346-1 OCLC 11970040
- Victoria: An Intimate Biography. New York: Dutton, 1987; 700 pages. ISBN 0-525-24469-7 OCLC 13666542
- Bernard Shaw on the London Art Scene, 1885–1950. University Park: Pennsylvania State University Press, 1989. ISBN 0-271-00665-X OCLC 18950120
- Long Day's Journey Into War: December 7, 1941. New York: Dutton, 1991. ISBN 0-525-93344-1 OCLC 23179418
- Bernard Shaw: A Guide to Research. University Park: Pennsylvania State University Press, 1992.
- Disraeli: A Biography. New York: Dutton, 1993. ISBN 0-525-93668-8 OCLC 27684040
- Arms and the Man and John Bull's Other Island by George Bernard Shaw, with an Introduction by Stanley and Rodelle Weintraub. New York: Bantam, 1993.
- The Last Great Victory : the End of World War II, July–August 1945. New York : Truman Talley Books, 1995. ISBN 0-525-93687-4 OCLC 31610439
- Shaw's People: Victoria to Churchill. University Park: Pennsylvania State University Press, 1996. ISBN 0-271-01500-4 OCLC 32312138
- Uncrowned King: The Life of Prince Albert. New York: Free Press, 1997. ISBN 0-684-83486-3 OCLC 36008453; Weintraub, Stanley (April 2000). 2000 pbk edition. Simon and Schuster. ISBN 978-0-7432-0609-9.
- MacArthur's War: Korea and the Undoing of an American Hero. New York: Free Press, 2000. ISBN 0-684-83419-7 OCLC 41548333
- Dear Young Friend: the Letters of American Presidents to Children. Ed. with Rodelle Weintraub. Mechanicsburg, PA: Stackpole Press, 2000.
- Edward the Caresser: the Playboy Prince who Became Edward VII. New York: Free Press, 2001. ISBN 0-684-85318-3 OCLC 45375122
- Silent Night: The Remarkable Christmas Truce of 1914. New York: Free Press, 2001. ISBN 0-684-87281-1 OCLC 46918071
- Charlotte and Lionel: a Rothschild Love Story. New York: Free Press, 2003. ISBN 0-7432-2686-0 OCLC 50511533
- General Washington's Christmas Farewell: a Mount Vernon Homecoming, 1783. New York: Free Press, 2003. ISBN 0-7432-4654-3 OCLC 51978064; Weintraub, Stanley (2003). 2003 pbk edition. Simon and Schuster. ISBN 978-0-7432-4654-5.
- Iron Tears: America's Battle for Freedom, Britain's Quagmire, 1775–1783. New York: Free Press, 2005. (also, subtitled Rebellion in America, 1775–1783. London: Simon and Schuster, 2005) ISBN 0-7432-2687-9 OCLC 56592341
- Eleven Days in December. Christmas at the Bulge, 1944. New York: Free Press, 2006. ISBN 0-7432-8710-X OCLC 69645839
- 15 Stars: Eisenhower, MacArthur, Marshall: Three Generals Who Saved the American Century. New York: Free Press, 2007. ISBN 0-7432-7527-6 OCLC 124074718
- General Sherman's Christmas. Savannah, 1864. New York: Harper/Smithsonian, 2009. ISBN 0-06-170298-6 OCLC 263605547
- Farewell, Victoria! English Literature 1880–1900. Greensboro, NC: ELT PRESS / University of North Carolina at Greensboro, 2011. ISBN 0-944318-25-8 OCLC 760167199
- Who's Afraid of Bernard Shaw? Some Personalities in Shaw's Plays. Gainesville: University Press of Florida, 2011. ISBN 0-8130-3726-3 OCLC 707260815
- Victorian Yankees at Queen Victoria's Court: American Encounters with Victoria and Albert. Newark: University of Delaware Press, 2011. ISBN 1-61149-060-X OCLC 698327984
- Pearl Harbor Christmas: A World at War, December 1941. New York: DaCapo Press, 2011. ISBN 0-306-82061-7 OCLC 758974640
- Final Victory: FDR's Extraordinary World War II Presidential Campaign. New York: Da Capo Press, 2012. ISBN 0-306-82113-3 OCLC 744287559
- Young Mr. Roosevelt: FDR's Introduction to War, Politics, and Life. New York: Da Capo Press, 2013. ISBN 0-306-82118-4 OCLC 841198197

== Awards ==
Weintraub was a Guggenheim Fellow for the academic year 1968–1969. On 11 November 1982, the university inaugurated the "Rodelle and Stanley Weintraub Center for the Study of the Arts and Humanities," containing a collection of their books, papers and memorabilia. In 2011, he was awarded the Honorary Degree of Doctor of Letters by West Chester University of Pennsylvania.
