= James E. McWilliams =

American historian

- Born: November 28, 1968 (age 57)
- Education: Georgetown University (B.A., 1991); Harvard University (Ed.M., 1994); University of Texas at Austin (M.A., 1996); Johns Hopkins University (Ph.D., 2001)
- Occupations: Author, professor
- Notable work: Just Food: How Locavores are Endangering the Future of Food and How We Can Truly Eat Responsibly (2009), American Pests: The Losing War on Insects from Colonial Times to DDT (2008)
- Website: James McWilliams: Texas State University

James E. McWilliams (born November 28, 1968) is professor of history at Texas State University. He specializes in American history, of the colonial and early national period, and in the environmental history of the United States. He also writes for The Texas Observer and the History News Service, and has published a number of op-eds on food in The New York Times, The Christian Science Monitor, and USA Today. Some of his most popular articles focus on animal rights and veganism.

== Career ==
He received his B.A. in philosophy from Georgetown University in 1991, his Ed.M. from Harvard University in 1994, his M.A. in American studies from the University of Texas at Austin in 1996, and his Ph.D. in history from Johns Hopkins University in 2001. He won the Walter Muir Whitehill Prize in Early American History awarded by the Colonial Society of Massachusetts for 2000, and won the Hiett Prize in the Humanities from the Dallas Institute of Humanities and Culture in 2009. He has been a fellow in the Agrarian Studies Program at Yale University.

== Animal rights ==
McWilliams became plant-based in 2008 for environmental reasons and after studying the literature on the moral rights of animals became vegan. He authored articles central to the philosophic debate of animal rights. In 2015, McWilliams authored The Modern Savage: Our Unthinking Decision to Eat Animals, a book that criticizes the locavore movement, such as backyard and nonindustrial farms which preach compassionate care of animals but slaughter them in the end. He documented how small farms have problems such as painful and unethical practices such as botched backyard slaughters, castrations without painkillers, cow-calf separation, nose rings, predation and withheld veterinary care.

McWilliams later gave up veganism and added insects to his plant-based diet for ethical reasons. In 2018, he argued that insects do not feel pain therefore they cannot suffer and that agricultural practices kill innumerable insects. He commented that "on strictly utilitarian terms, the (vegan) argument just doesn’t hold up". He has defended an ethical diet within the utilitarian tradition that includes insects, oysters, in-vitro-meat and roadkill. Whilst McWilliams feels a valid case can be made for consuming insects and roadkill, he says that moral arguments fall apart when it comes to livestock, commenting "every problem with our food system now and historically leads you to domesticated animals".

== Reception ==
McWilliams' 2005 book A Revolution in Eating was positively reviewed by anthropologist Jeffrey Cole as an "engaging, creative, and informative account of food in colonial British America." Historian Etta Madden also positively reviewed the book, commenting that "McWilliams's study of the production and consumption of food contributes to a great understanding of the relationship between food and American identity." Historian Virginia DeJohn Anderson described it as an "engagingly written book that examines culinary themes within the larger context of colonial development and, ultimately, revolution".

Biologist Marc Bekoff positively reviewed The Modern Savage, as a "very thoughtful work about our meal plans in which he covers the ecological and ethical reasons for not eating nonhuman animals (animals)." Kirkus Reviews commented, "While McWilliams offers convincing arguments for animal rights, they are undermined by the extensive quotes, which become tiresome and offer little useful context." McWilliams' views on agriculture, food production, and animal husbandry have been criticized by other authors in the space, including Joel Salatin. In her review in the Chicago Tribune, journalist Monica Eng questions McWilliams' "contrarian essays" that "play well in the land of page views, [but] don't always fare so well in terms of accuracy."

McWilliams' 2017 book Eating Promiscuously: Adventures in the Future of Food advocates for nutrition outside the industrial food system including insect and oyster farmers, road kill foragers and seaweed harvesters. Anna Call of Foreword Reviews suggested that the book "consistently gets sidetracked on ethical questions of veganism" but would probably be enjoyed by "freegans, dulse enthusiasts, and other radical food warriors".

McWilliams was a finalist in the 2026 Pulitzer Prize biography category for his biography of poet Frank Stanford. A review by Publishers Weekly described the biography as a page turner that "does a remarkable job connecting Stanford's poetry with his personal life".

== Selected publications ==
- McWilliams, James E. (October 2013). The Pecan: A History of America's Native Nut. University Texas Press. ISBN 978-0-292-74916-0. Archived from the original on 2014-01-16.
- McWilliams, James E. (2013-04-24). The Politics of the Pasture. Lantern Books. Archived from the original on August 6, 2021.
- McWilliams, James E. (2009-08-15). Just Food: Where Locavores Get It Wrong and How We Can Truly Eat Responsibly. Little, Brown and Company. ISBN 978-0316033749. OCLC 319868125.
- McWilliams, James E. (2008-06-17). American Pests: The Losing War on Insects from Colonial Times to DDT. Columbia University Press. ISBN 978-0231139427. OCLC 187394546. "isbn:9780231139427."
  - Review: Wanner, Irene (2008-08-08). ""American Pests": Our wrongheaded approach to insect control". The Seattle Times. Archived from the original on 2011-05-24.
- McWilliams, James E. (2007-06-12). Building the Bay Colony: Local Economy and Culture in Early Massachusetts. University of Virginia Press. ISBN 978-0813926360. OCLC 76820854.
- McWilliams, James E. (2005-06-01). A Revolution In Eating: How the Quest for Food Shaped America. Arts and Traditions of the Table: Perspectives on Culinary History. Columbia University Press. ISBN 978-0231129923. OCLC 850974749.
- McWilliams, James E. (January 2015). The Modern Savage: Our Unthinking Decision to Eat Animals. Thomas Dunne Books. ISBN 978-1-250-03119-8.
- McWilliams, James E. (May 2017). Eating Promiscuously: Adventures in the Future of Food. Counterpoint. ISBN 978-1-61902-735-0.

== See also ==
- Ethical omnivorism
- Food studies
