= The Shakespeare Yearbook =

- Discipline: Literature
- Language: English

Publication details
- History: 1990–present
- Publisher: Texas A&M University (United States)
- Frequency: Annual

Standard abbreviations
- ISO 4: Shakespeare Yearb.

Indexing
- ISSN: 1045-9456

Links
- Journal homepage

The Shakespeare Yearbook is an annual academic journal specializing in Shakespearean and early modern topics. It was founded by Texas A&M Professor of English Douglas A. Brooks and edited by him until his death in 2009. The yearbook has been published by Texas A&M University since 2003.

The yearbook publishes thematically organized volumes: For example, "Shakespeare and Spain" (2002), "Shakespeare and the Low Countries" (2004), and "The Shakespeare Apocrypha" (2005).
