= Sylvia Kierkegaard =

Philippine legal scholar

Sylvia Mercado Kierkegaard
- Born: 1952
- Died: 2015 (aged 62–63)
- Scientific career
- Workplaces: University of Southampton
- Website: www.kierkegaard.co.uk

Sylvia Mercado Kierkegaard was a Philippine jurist who specialized in computer law.

The breadth of her research included a wide range of topics, such as comparative contract law, alternative dispute resolution, intellectual property rights, European Union law, privacy law, electronic commerce, cybersecurity, computer law, and Information privacy (i.e., data protection). She wrote and edited books and journal articles.

She was the president of the International Association of IT Lawyers (IAITL), an association of IT lawyers and legal scholars specializing in computer law, privacy, and security.

In 2003, she finished an International Masters degree in European Business and Law at Aarhus University.

She died in 2015.

== Career ==
Kierkegaard was a professor at the Communications University of China, professor-research fellow at The Institute for Law and the Web (ILAWS; University of Southampton), and adjunct professor at Xi'an Jiaotong University.

She was a frequent keynote speaker, invited expert, and panelist of various international workshops organised by international institutions, judiciary, European Union, television, and government bodies.

== Community service ==
Kierkegaard served as chair of the Organizing Committee of the IAITL legal conference series and is editor-in-chief of the Journal of International Commercial Law and Technology, International Journal of Private Law, and the International Journal of Public Law and Policy. She serves also as associate editor of the International Journal of Intercultural Information Management, and managing editor of the Journal of Legal Technology Risk and Management.

Kierkegaard served as an expert adviser, speaker, and member of various study groups and committees for the European Union and the Council of Europe, which draft policies and proposals for legislative and regulatory policies on international level, as well as international associations.

Other activities included serving as a member of the Policy and Scientific Committee of the European Privacy Association.

== Publications ==
=== Articles ===
- Kierkegaard, S. & Kierkegaard, P. (2013) Danger to public health: medical devices, toxicity, virus and fraud Computer Law & Security Review, Vol. 29 (1), pp. 13–27, DOI: 10.1016/j.clsr.2012.11.006
- Kierkegaard, S.; Waters, N.; Greenleaf, G.; Thole, E.; Grosheide, W. & DeMarco, J.V. (2012) Comments to the CoE Convention 108 draft proposal on data protection. Computer Law & Security Review, Vol. 28 (3), pp. 368–377
- Kierkegaard, S.; Schulz, W.; Mingde, L. & Enders, T. (2011) Impact and Challenges of IPR: Co Reach in IPR 2 Report. Computer Law & Security Review Vol. 27 (4)
- Kierkegaard, S. (2011) Postscript – Brown v EMA/ ESA- US Supreme Court decision 27 June 2011, Computer Law & Security Review Vol. 27 (4)
- Kierkegaard, S. (2011) US War on terror: EU SWIFT(ly)signs blank cheque on EU data. Computer Law & Security Review Vol. 27 (5)
- Kierkegaard, S. (2011) To Block or Not to Block-European Child Porno Law in Question. Computer Law & Security Review Vol. 27 (6)
- Kierkegaard, S.; Ringnalda, A. & Kreutzer, T. (2011) CoReach in IPR in New Media Workshop: CLSR co-hosts policy meeting on ISP Liability. Computer Law & Security Review. Vol. 27 (2)
- Kierkegaard, S. (2011) Postal 2 Plays in US Court: Schwarzenegger v. Entertainment Merchants Association. Computer Law & Security Review Vol. 27 (3)

=== Books ===
- Kierkegaard, S. & Grosheide, W. (2012) Copyright Law in the Making: Chinese and European Perspectives, CO-REACH. ISBN 978-87-994854-0-6
- Kierkegaard, S. (2008) Cyberlaw, Security and Privacy (2008). ISBN 87-991385-3-0
- Kierkegaard, S. (2007) International Law and Trade: Bridging the East-West Divide, Ankara Bar Press. ISBN 978-87-991385-2-4
