= International Journal of Private Law =

- Discipline: Private law
- Language: English
- Edited by: Sylvia Kierkegaard

Publication details
- History: 2008-present
- Publisher: Inderscience Publishers
- Frequency: Quarterly

Standard abbreviations
- ISO 4: Int. J. Priv. Law

Indexing
- ISSN: 1753-6235

Links
- Journal homepage

The International Journal of Private Law is a quarterly peer-reviewed law journal covering all aspects of private law, including audio-visual, media, communication, and space law. It is intended to cover the legal issues facing individuals, entrepreneurs, and business owners on an international scale. The editor-in-chief is Sylvia Kierkegaard. Occasionally, the journal publishes special issues on important topics in private law. The journal is abstracted and indexed by Scopus.
