= The Acorn (journal) =

- Discipline: philosophy
- Language: English
- Edited by: Greg Moses

Publication details
- History: 1986–present
- Publisher: St. Bonaventure University, philosophy department (United States)
- Frequency: Biannual

Standard abbreviations
- ISO 4: Acorn

Indexing
- ISSN: 1092-6534 (print); 2153-8263 (web)
- LCCN: 97-640757
- OCLC no.: 23113339

Links
- Journal homepage; Online access

The Acorn is a peer-reviewed academic journal sponsored by the Gandhi-King Society. It explores philosophical issues related to non-violence in theory and practice, with a focus on the work of M. K. Gandhi and Martin Luther King, Jr. Notable contributors include Thich Nhat Hanh, Ham Seok-heon, and Michael N. Nagler. The journal was established in 1986 by Ha Poong Kim, and is produced in the philosophy department at St. Bonaventure University. It is available online from the Philosophy Documentation Center.

The editor-in-chief is Greg Moses (Texas State University).

== See also ==
- List of philosophy journals
- List of political science journals
