= Nabokov Studies =

Academic literary journal

- Discipline: Literature
- Language: English
- Edited by: Zoran Kuzmanovich

Publication details
- History: 1994–present
- Publisher: Davidson College and the International Vladimir Nabokov Society
- Frequency: Annual

Standard abbreviations
- ISO 4: Nabokov Stud.

Indexing
- ISSN: 1080-1219 (print); 1548-9965 (web)
- LCCN: 94657752
- OCLC no.: 1127149311

Links
- Journal homepage

Nabokov Studies is an annual peer-reviewed academic journal published by Davidson College and the International Vladimir Nabokov Society. The journal covers research on the Russian-American writer Vladimir Nabokov. The journal was established by D. Barton Johnson in 1994 and the editor-in-chief is Zoran Kuzmanovich. The journal covers critical and theoretical studies about the work by Vladimir Nabokov.
