= The Wallace Stevens Journal =

- Discipline: Literature
- Language: English
- Edited by: Bart Eeckhout

Publication details
- History: 1977-present
- Publisher: Johns Hopkins University Press (United States)
- Frequency: Biannually

Standard abbreviations
- ISO 4: Wallace Stevens J.

Indexing
- ISSN: 0148-7132
- LCCN: 77643237
- OCLC no.: 3092707

Links
- Journal homepage; Online access

The Wallace Stevens Journal is an academic journal established in 1977 and the official publication of The Wallace Stevens Society. It covers the works and life of the American modernist poet Wallace Stevens. The journal is published twice a year by the Johns Hopkins University Press.
