= Farzad Sharifian =

Australian linguist (1964–2020)

- Born: 1964
- Died: 12 May 2020 (aged 56); Melbourne
- Known for: Pioneer of cultural linguistics, and for contributions to linguistics, cognitive science, anthropology, and applied linguistics
- Title: Professor and Chair in Cultural Linguistics
- Website: https://farzadsharifian.com/

Farzad Sharifian (Persian: فرزاد شریفیان) was a pioneer of cultural linguistics and held the Chair in Cultural Linguistics at Monash University. He developed a theoretical and an analytical framework of cultural cognition, cultural conceptualisations, and language, which draw on and expands the analytical tools and theoretical advancements in several disciplines and sub-disciplines, including cognitive psychology, anthropology, distributed cognition, and complexity science. The theoretical/analytical frameworks and their applications in several areas of applied linguistics including intercultural communication, cross-cultural/intercultural pragmatics, World Englishes, Teaching English as an International Language (TEIL), and political discourse analysis are the subject of Sharifian’s monographs entitled Cultural Conceptualisations and Language (John Benjamins, 2011) and Cultural Linguistics (John Benjamins, 2017). These books have widely been recognised as laying "solid theoretical and analytical grounds for what can be recognised as Cultural Linguistics". (Alexandra Bagasheva, in the journal of Language and Cognition, Vol. 4:3 (2012), pp. 243–249).

Professor Sharifian was the founding Editor-in-Chief of the International Journal of Language and Culture, and the Series Editor of Cultural Linguistics book series (Springer), and the founding Series Editor of Routledge Advances in Teaching English as an International Language (Routledge). He published articles in many edited books and in more than 25 international journals. His awards and honours included the Humboldt Fellowship for Experienced Researchers, from the Alexander von Humboldt Foundation, Germany.

== Career ==
In his early career, Sharifian was an English language teacher in Esfahan. He moved to Melbourne in 1998, and he completed multiple award winning research (The University Research Medal, Dean's Prize for Outstanding Research, and Western Australian Institute of Education Early Career Medal) at Edith Cowan University in 2003. He was awarded a Post-Doctoral Fellowship by the Australian Research Council in 2003, based at the University of Western Australia. He was appointed a Lecturer at Monash University in 2005. In 2008 he was appointed the Director of Language and Society Centre at Monash. In 2011, after only 6 years of scholarly service at Monash, he was appointed Professor. He was appointed as the Chair in Cultural Linguistics in 2015. In 2014 he was elected as the President of Applied Linguistics Association of Australia.

Professor Farzad Sharifian's death was announced in a statement by the Australian Linguistic Society on 12 May 2020

== Books ==
- Sharifian, F. (2011). Cultural Conceptualisations and Language: Theoretical Framework and Applications. Amsterdam/Philadelphia: John Benjamins.
- Sharifian, F. (ed.) (2009). English as an International Language: Perspectives and pedagogical issues. Clevedon, UK: Multilingual Matters.
- Sharifian, F. Dirven, R., Yu, N, & Niemeier, S. (eds.) (2008) Culture, Body, and language: Conceptualizations of internal body organs across cultures and languages. Berlin/New York: Mouton De Gruyter.
- Sharifian, F. & Palmer, G. B. (eds.) (2007) Applied cultural linguistics: Implications for second language learning and intercultural communication. Amsterdam/Philadelphia: John Benjamins.
- Sharifian, F. & Jamarani, M. (eds.) (2013). Intercultural Communication in the New Era. New York/London: Routledge/Taylor and Francis.
- Sharifian, F. (ed.) (2015). The Routledge Handbook of Language and Culture. New York/London: Routledge/Taylor and Francis
- Sharifian, F. (ed.) (2017) Advances in Cultural Linguistics. New York/London/ Singapore: Springer.
- Sharifian, F. (2017) Cultural Linguistics. Amsterdam/PA: John Benjamins.

== Selected journal articles ==
Sadeghpour M, & Sharifian F. (2019) World Englishes in English language teaching. World Englishes. 38:245–258. (Special Issue in Memory of Braj Kachru)

Sharifian, F. (2021). Cultural Linguistics and Poetry: The case of Khayyam’s Rubaiyat. International Journal of Persian Literature.

Sharifian, F., & Bagheri, M. (2019). Conceptualisations of xoshbakhti ‘happiness/prosperity’ and baxt ‘luck/fate’ in Persian. Journal of Historical Pragmatics, 20 (1): 78-95.

Sharifian, F. & Tayebi, T. (2017). Perception of (im)politeness and underlying cultural conceptualisations. A study of Persian. Pragmatics and Society. 8(2), 31-253.

Sharifian, F. (2017). Cultural Linguistics and linguistic relativity. Language Sciences. 59, 83-92 [pre-published version]

Xu, Z. & Sharifian, F. (2017). Unpacking Cultural Conceptualizations in Chinese English. Asia-Pacific Journal of Communication. 27(1), 65-84.

Sharifian, F. & Jamarani, M. (2015). Conceptualisations of damâ ‘temperature’ in Persian: A Cultural Linguistic Study. Cognitive Linguistic Studies. 2(2), 239-256.

Sharifian, F. (2015). Cultural Linguistics and World Englishes. World Englishes. 34(4)-515-532.

Sharifian, F. & Musgrave, S. (2013). Migration and multilingualism: Focus on Melbourne. International Journal of Multilingualism. 10(4), 361-374.

Sharifian, F. (2013). Globalisation and developing meta-cultural competence in learning English as an International Language. Multilingual Education. Download

Sharifian. F. & Jamarani, M. (2011). Cultural schemas in intercultural communication: A study of Persian cultural schema of sharmandegi ‘being ashamed’. Intercultural Pragmatics. 8(2), 227-251.

Sharifian, F. (2010). Cultural conceptualizations in intercultural communication: a study of Aboriginal and non-Aboriginal Australians. Journal of Pragmatics, 42, 3367-3376. download prepublished version

Sharifian, F. (2009). Figurative language in international political discourse: The case of Iran. Journal of Language and Politics. 8(3), 416–432.

Sharifian, F. (2008). Cultural schemas in L1 and L2 compliment responses: A study of Persian-speaking learners of English. Journal of Politeness Research. 4(1), 55-80.

Sharifian, F. & Clyne, M. (2008) English as an International Language: Synthesis. Australian Review of Applied Linguistics.31 (3), pp. 36.1–36.19. link

Clyne, M. G. and Sharifian, F. (2008) English as an International Language: Challenges and possibilities. Australian Review of Applied Linguistics. 31 (3), pp. 36.1–36.19. link

Sharifian, F. (2008). Aboriginal English in the classroom: An asset or a liability? Language Awareness. 17(2), 131-138

Sharifian, F. (2007). Politics and/of translation: Case studies between English and Persian. Journal of Intercultural Studies. 28(4), 413-424.

Sharifian, F.& Lotfi, A. R. (2007). “When stones falls”: A conceptual-functional account of subject-verb agreement in Modern Persian. Language Sciences. 29(6), 787-803.

Sharifian, F. (2006). A cultural-conceptual approach and world Englishes: The case of Aboriginal English. World Englishes. 25(1),11-22.

Sharifian, F. (2005). The Persian cultural schema of shekasteh-nafsi: A study of complement responses in Persian and Anglo-Australian speakers. Pragmatics & Cognition. 13(2), 337-361.
