= International Journal of Persian Literature =

- Discipline: Persian literature
- Language: English
- Edited by: Alireza Korangy, Homa Katouzian

Publication details
- History: 2016-present
- Publisher: Pennsylvania State University Press (United States)
- Frequency: annual

Standard abbreviations
- ISO 4: Int. J. Persian Lit.

Indexing
- ISSN: 2376-5739 (print); 2376-5755 (web)
- LCCN: 2014203742
- JSTOR: intejperslite
- OCLC no.: 1137859468

International Journal of Persian Literature (IJPL) is an annual peer-reviewed academic journal covering Persian poetics, poetry, classical Persian philology, prose, and the literature of Iran and the broader geographical areas. It is indexed in Emerging Sources Citation Index, European Reference Index for the Humanities and Social Sciences (ERIH PLUS), International Bibliography of Periodical Literature and Scopus.
