= SHAW: The Annual of Bernard Shaw Studies =

- Discipline: Literature
- Language: English
- Edited by: Michel W. Pharand

Publication details
- Former name(s): The Shaw Review, Bulletin (Shaw Society of America)
- History: 1951-present
- Publisher: Penn State University Press (United States)
- Frequency: Annually

Standard abbreviations
- ISO 4: SHAW

Indexing
- ISSN: 0741-5842 (print); 1529-1480 (web)
- JSTOR: 07415842
- OCLC no.: 7556559

Links
- Journal homepage; Online access

SHAW: The Annual of Bernard Shaw Studies is an academic journal devoted to the works and life of George Bernard Shaw. The journal is published annually by the Penn State University Press. The journal formerly went by the names Bulletin (Shaw Society of America) (1951–1958) and The Shaw Review (1959–1980).
