= Penn State University Press =

American university press

- Founded: 1956
- Country of origin: United States
- Headquarters location: University Park, Pennsylvania
- Distribution: Self-distributed (US and most of world); University of Toronto Press (Canada); NBN International (Europe); MHM (Japan); Footprint Books (Australia)
- Publication types: Books, Academic journals
- Imprints: Eisenbrauns, Graphic Mundi
- Official website: psupress.org

The Penn State University Press, also known as The Pennsylvania State University Press, is a non-profit publisher of scholarly books and journals. Established in 1956, it is the independent publishing branch of the Pennsylvania State University and is a division of the Penn State University Library system.

Penn State University Press publishes books and journals of interest to scholars and general audiences. As a part of a land-grant university with a mandate to serve the citizens of the commonwealth of Pennsylvania, it also specializes in works about Penn State University, Pennsylvania, and the mid-Atlantic region. The areas of scholarship the Press is best known for are art history, medieval studies, Latin American studies, rhetoric and communication, religious studies, and graphic medicine.

The press produces about 80 books a year and over 60 journals. The Press employs 25 to 30 people, and has several internship programs for Penn State students interested in a publishing career.

== History ==
The first book published by Penn State University Press was Penn State Yankee: The Autobiography of Fred Lewis Pattee, the autobiography of a noted Penn State faculty member who was the first professor of American literature in the United States.

In 2016 the Press launched PSU Press Unlocked, an open-access platform featuring over 70 books and journals. The Press acquired academic publisher Eisenbrauns, which specializes in ancient Near East and biblical studies, in November 2017. Eisenbrauns continues to publish as an imprint of the Press. In 2021, the Press launched the Graphic Mundi graphic novel imprint.

== Notable titles ==
- The Hidden Life of Life: A Walk through the Reaches of Time by Elizabeth Marshall Thomas
- The Noisy Renaissance: Sound, Architecture, and Florentine Urban Life by Niall Atkinson
- Graphic Medicine Manifesto by MK Czerwiec, Ian Williams, Susan Merrill Squier, Michael J. Green, Kimberly R. Myers, and Scott T. Smith
- Henry James and American Painting by Colm Tóibín, Marc Simpson and Declan Kiely
- Medieval Studies and the Ghost Stories of M. R. James by Patrick Murphy
- Field Guide to Wild Mushrooms of Pennsylvania and the Mid-Atlantic by Bill Russell
- Ernest Hemingway: A New Life by James M. Hutchisson
- The English translation of The Holy Teaching of Vimalakirti by Robert Thurman
- The Novels of the Harlem Renaissance:Twelve Black Writers, 1923–1933 by Amritjit Singh

== Journals ==
- ab-Original: Journal of Indigenous Studies and First Nations and First Peoples' Cultures, edited by Australian linguist Jakelin Troy The first issue was published in 2017, but as of 2023 appears to be archived.
- AMP: American Music Perspectives
- The Arthur Miller Journal
- Bishop–Lowell Studies
- Bulletin for Biblical Research
- Bustan: The Middle East Book Review
- Calíope: Journal of the Society for Renaissance and Baroque Hispanic Poetry
- The Chaucer Review: A Journal of Medieval Studies and Literary Criticism
- Comedia Performance: Journal of the Association for Hispanic Classical Theater
- Comparative Literature Studies
- The Cormac McCarthy Journal
- Critical Philosophy of Race
- Dickens Studies Annual: Essays on Victorian Fiction
- Ecumenica: Performance and Religion
- The Edgar Allan Poe Review
- Edith Wharton Review
- The Eugene O'Neill Review
- The F. Scott Fitzgerald Review
- George Eliot–George Henry Lewes Studies
- Gestalt Review
- The Good Society: A Journal of Civic Studies
- The Harold Pinter Review: Essays on Contemporary Drama
- Hiperboreea
- Hungarian Studies Review
- Interdisciplinary Literary Studies: A Journal of Criticism and Theory
- International Journal of Persian Literature
- Journal for the Study of Paul and His Letters
- Journal of African Development
- Journal of Africana Religions
- Journal of Asia-Pacific Pop Culture
- The Journal of Assessment and Institutional Effectiveness
- Journal of Austrian-American History
- The Journal of Ayn Rand Studies
- Journal of Comparative Philology
- Journal of Development Perspectives
- Journal of Eastern Mediterranean Archaeology and Heritage Studies
- Journal of General Education: A Curricular Commons of the Humanities and Sciences
- Journal of Information Policy
- The Journal of Jewish Ethics
- Journal of Medieval Religious Cultures
- Journal of Minority Achievement, Creativity, and Leadership
- Journal of Modern Periodical Studies
- Journal of Moravian History
- Journal of Natural Resources Policy Research
- The Journal of Nietzsche Studies
- Journal of Posthuman Studies: Philosophy, Technology, Media
- Journal of Speculative Philosophy
- Journal of the Pennsylvania Academy of Science
- Journal of Theological Interpretation
- The Journal of World Christianity
- The Korean Language in America
- The Langston Hughes Review
- Libraries: Culture, History, and Society
- The Mark Twain Annual
- Mediterranean Studies
- Milton Studies
- Nathaniel Hawthorne Review
- Nineteenth Century Studies
- Pacific Coast Philology
- Pennsylvania History: A Journal of Mid-Atlantic Studies
- Philosophia Africana: Analysis of Philosophy and Issues in Africa and the Black Diaspora
- Philosophy & Rhetoric
- Preternature: Critical and Historical Studies on the Preternatural
- Reception: Texts, Readers, Audiences, History
- Resources for American Literary Study
- SHAW: The Journal of Bernard Shaw Studies
- Soundings: An Interdisciplinary Journal
- Steinbeck Review
- Studies in American Humor
- Studies in American Jewish Literature
- Studies in the American Short Story
- Style
- Theatre and Performance Notes and Counternotes
- Thornton Wilder Journal
- Transformations: The Journal of Inclusive Scholarship and Pedagogy
- Transportation Journal
- Utopian Studies
- Victorians Institute Journal
- Wesley and Methodist Studies
- William Carlos Williams Review

== See also ==
- List of English-language book publishing companies
- List of university presses
- Penn State Libraries Open Publishing
