= Barbara Schultz =

American television producer (1927–2019)

- Born: Barbara Ann Schultz; February 4, 1927; New York City, U.S.
- Died: September 2, 2019 (aged 92); New York City, U.S.
- Education: Barnard College
- Occupations: Television executive; television producer; television director
- Years active: 1959–1987
- Television: Visions (1976–1980)

Barbara Ann Schultz (February 4, 1927 – September 2, 2019) was an American television producer and director. She is best known for her work as the executive producer and artistic director for the anthology drama series Visions (1976–1980) on PBS.

== Early life and education ==
Born in Manhattan on February 4, 1927, Schultz was raised in New Jersey by her homemaker mother and attorney father. She graduated from Barnard College in 1948, receiving a degree in English studies. She originally pursued acting, first taking roles in student productions at Barnard and making her Broadway debut in 1952 with a bit part in a production of the play Desire Under the Elms by Eugene O'Neill.

== Career ==
Turning away from acting, Schultz went into production amid the first Golden Age of Television. She started as an assistant story editor at Burt Lancaster's production company Hecht-Hill-Lancaster. She worked five years as a story editor at David Susskind's company Talent Associates and worked on series like The Defenders and The Trials of O'Brien (CBS) before stepping into an assistant producer role at Armstrong Circle Theatre. She became executive story editor, then executive producer, of CBS Playhouse. After Playhouse, her focus turned to CBS's programming for children, producing CBS Children's Hour and the reboot of educational series You Are There.

=== Visions and after ===
In 1974, Schultz joined the Los Angeles-based public broadcaster and PBS member station KCET as executive producer and artistic director of Visions, a weekly anthology series in which each episode would be a feature-length dramatic film by a screenwriter with no prior experience in television. KCET sought to maximize Schultz's artistic license and independence, with minimal interference.

Jean Shepherd, who wrote The Phantom of the Open Hearth for Visions, said Schultz "not only encouraged us at every turn but gave us a totally free hand, something most writers only dream about." Michael J. Arlen, writing for The New Yorker, said the high quality of Visions "has been a credit to its creators—especially to Barbara Schultz, the remarkably able and responsive woman who has been the program's artistic director and creative force." In 1979, Schultz received the Crystal Award from the Women in Film and Television and the Evelyn F. Burkey Award from the Writers Guild of America, East at the 31st Writers Guild of America Awards.

After Visions ended, Schultz occasionally directed episodes of sitcoms like Family Ties and Diff'rent Strokes. However, directing work quickly dried up for her; a longtime friend and collaborator on Visions, Sandra Schulberg, said "the industry was not very receptive to a woman director of her age." She also directed plays for the Los Angeles chapter of the New York–based Ensemble Studio Theatre.

== Death and legacy ==
Schultz died at her home in Manhattan on September 2, 2019, from complications from heart disease. She has been cited as a pioneering woman in the early American TV industry, which typically discouraged women from participating at executive levels of production. Her status as a trailblazer has been cited alongside such contemporaries as Jacqueline Babbin, Frances Buss Buch, Ida Lupino and Lela Swift.

== Filmography ==
Credits adapted from the website of the Paley Center for Media's She Made It initiative.

Series	Year(s)	Network	Credited as				Notes
Series	Year(s)	Network	Executive producer	Producer	Director	Other	Notes
Armstrong Circle Theatre	1959–1963	CBS	No	No	No	Yes	Story editor, assistant producer (later)
The Defenders	1963–64	CBS	No	No	No	Yes	Story editor
The Reporter	1964	CBS	No	No	No	Yes	Story editor
The Doctors and the Nurses	1964–65	CBS	No	No	No	Yes	Story editor
The Trials of O'Brien	1965–66	CBS	No	No	No	Yes	Story editor
CBS Playhouse	1967–1970	CBS	Yes	No	No	Yes	Also executive story editor
CBS Children's Hour	1969–70	CBS	Yes	No	No	No	
You Are There	1971–72	CBS	No	Yes	No	No	
The Electric Company	1972	CBS	No	No	No	Yes	Consultant
Visions	1976–1978	PBS	Yes	Yes	No	Yes	Also creator
Family Ties	1985, 1987	NBC	No	No	Yes	No	Episodes: "The Old College Try", "Matchmaker"
Diff'rent Strokes	1986	ABC	No	No	Yes	No	Episode: "Bulimia"
You Again?	1986	NBC	No	No	Yes	No	Episode: "Enid Quits"
Webster	1987	ABC	No	No	Yes	No	Episode: "A Test of Characters"

== Archived works ==
In 2006, the Paley Center for Media (then known as the Museum of Television & Radio) named Barbara Schultz one of the honorees of its multi-year initiative "She Made It: Women Creating Television and Radio", thereby inducting some of her works into its permanent collections. More from Schultz's filmography can be found preserved in the UCLA Film and Television Archive, and two of her productions—J.T. (1969, CBS Playhouse) and The Gold Watch (1976, Visions)—were screened at the Billy Wilder Theater in a retrospective of her work as part of the 2017 UCLA Festival of Preservation.

Title	Original air date	Series	Preserved by	
Title	Original air date	Series	Paley Center	UCLA Archive
"My Father and My Mother"	February 13, 1968	CBS Playhouse	No	Yes
"The People Next Door"	October 15, 1968	CBS Playhouse	Yes	No
"Saturday Adoption"	December 4, 1968	CBS Playhouse	No	Yes
"The Experiment"	February 25, 1969	CBS Playhouse	No	Yes
"Shadow Game"	May 7, 1969	CBS Playhouse	Yes	Yes
"Sadbird"	December 1, 1969	CBS Playhouse	No	Yes
J.T.	December 13, 1969	CBS Children's Hour	Yes	Yes
"The Day Before Sunday"	February 10, 1970	CBS Playhouse	No	Yes
Two Brothers	October 21, 1976	Visions	Yes	Yes
The War Widow	October 28, 1976	Visions	Yes	Yes
El Corrido	November 4, 1976	Visions	No	Yes
The Gold Watch	November 11, 1976	Visions	No	Yes
Liza's Pioneer Diary	November 18, 1976	Visions	Yes	Yes
The Great Cherub Knitwear Strike	November 25, 1976	Visions	No	Yes
Scenes from the Middle Class	December 16, 1976	Visions	No	Yes
The Phantom of the Open Hearth	December 23, 1976	Visions	No	Yes
The Tapestry and Circles	December 30, 1976	Visions	No	Yes
Iowa	October 2, 1977	Visions	Yes	No
Freeman	October 9, 1977	Visions	No	Yes
Charlie Smith and the Fritter Tree	October 9, 1978	Visions	No	Yes
Shoes and String	January 12, 1980	Visions	No	Yes
It's the Willingness	January 19, 1980	Visions	No	Yes

== Sources ==
- Anon. (n.d.a). "MTR | She Made It | Barbara Schultz [Meet]". She Made It: Women Creating Television and Radio. New York: Paley Center for Media. Archived from the original on October 20, 2007.
- Anon. (n.d.b). "MTR | She Made It | Barbara Schultz [Profile]". She Made It: Women Creating Television and Radio. New York: Paley Center for Media. Archived from the original on October 21, 2007.
- Anon. (n.d.c). "MTR | She Made It | Barbara Schultz [Collection]". She Made It: Women Creating Television and Radio. New York: Paley Center for Media. Archived from the original on October 21, 2007.
- Anon. (August 24, 2023). "UCLA Film & Television Archive Resources - Women in American Film and Television Production". UCLA Library Research Guides. Los Angeles: UCLA Library. Archived from the original on September 1, 2023.
- Anon. (n.d.). "UCLA | UC Library Search - 'Barbara Schultz'". UCLA Film and Television Archive Catalog. Los Angeles: UCLA Library. Archived from the original on September 5, 2023.
- Anon. (October 12, 2006). "MTR Announces 2006 She Made It Honorees". PaleyCenter.org (Press release). New York & Los Angeles: The Museum of Television and Radio. Archived from the original on September 23, 2020.
- Anon. (2012). "Honorary Awards: Past Winners". WGAEast.org. New York: Writers Guild of America, East. Archived from the original on April 27, 2012.
- Arlen, Michael J. (December 6, 1976). "The Air: What We Do in the Dark". The New Yorker. Vol. LII, no. 42. pp. 192–203. (subscription required)
- Byer Winkler, Charlotte (Fall 1979). "Class Notes: 46". Barnard Alumnae. Vol. LXIX, no. 1. New York: Barnard College. p. 31 – via the Internet Archive.
- Drake, Sylvie (March 6, 1982). "Seven 'Power Plays' at the Studio". Part V: Saturday/Calendar. Los Angeles Times. Vol. CI, no. 93. Los Angeles. p. 5 – via Newspapers.com. (subscription required)
- Gross, Linda (June 11, 1979). "Hayes Presents WIF Award to Gish". Part IV: View. Los Angeles Times. Vol. CVIII, no. 190. Los Angeles. pp. 10, 13 – via Newspapers.com. (subscription required)
- Land, Herman W. (1976). "Public Television Production—'It Can't All Be Done by One Club'". In Cater Nyhan, Douglass; Nyhan, Michael J. (eds.). The Future of Public Broadcasting. New York: Praeger Publishers. pp. 275–291. ISBN 0-275-56990-X.
- Montañez Smukler, Maya; Rhee, Jennifer (March 20, 2020). "In Recognition of Women's Work". UCLA Film and Television Archive. Los Angeles: UCLA Library. Archived from the original on September 30, 2022.
- O'Dell, Cary (2013). June Cleaver Was a Feminist! Reconsindering the Female Characters of Early Television. Jefferson, North Carolina: McFarland & Company, Inc. ISBN 978-0-7864-7177-5 – via the Internet Archive. (registration required)
- Quigley, Mark; Einstein, Dan (March 26, 2017). "Two by Barbara Schultz—Television Visionary". UCLA Film and Television Archive. Los Angeles: UCLA Library. Archived from the original on April 17, 2019.
- Schulberg, Sandra (April 16, 2019). "Barbara Schultz, 92, Pioneering Television & Film Producer Won Major Awards While Battling for Creative License" (PDF). IndieCollect. Archived (PDF) from the original on May 30, 2023.
- Seelye, Katharine Q. (April 16, 2019). "Barbara Schultz, 92, Dies; Produced Serious Drama in a Sitcom Era". The New York Times. (subscription required)
- Shepherd, Jean (1978). "An Introduction to the Film Script". The Phantom of the Open Hearth: A Film for Television. New York: Doubleday. pp. v–xvii. ISBN 0-385-12976-9 – via the Internet Archive. (registration required)
