= 22nd Directors Guild of America Awards =

- Date: February 14, 1970
- Location: The Beverly Hilton, Beverly Hills, California
- Country: United States
- Presented by: Directors Guild of America
- Hosted by: Hal Kanter

Highlights
- Best Director Feature Film: Midnight Cowboy – John Schlesinger
- Best Director Television: Hallmark Hall of Fame for "Teacher, Teacher" – Fielder Cook
- Website: https://www.dga.org/Awards/History/1960s/1969.aspx?value=1969

The 22nd Directors Guild of America Awards, honoring the outstanding directorial achievements in film and television in 1969, were presented on February 14, 1970, at the Beverly Hilton in Beverly Hills, California. The ceremony was hosted by Hal Kanter. The nominees were announced in January 1970.

== Winners and nominees ==
=== Film ===
Feature Film

John Schlesinger – Midnight Cowboy

- Richard Attenborough – Oh! What a Lovely War
- Costa-Gavras – Z
- George Roy Hill – Butch Cassidy and the Sundance Kid
- Dennis Hopper – Easy Rider
- Gene Kelly – Hello, Dolly!
- Sam Peckinpah – The Wild Bunch
- Larry Peerce – Goodbye, Columbus
- Sydney Pollack – They Shoot Horses, Don't They?
- Haskell Wexler – Medium Cool

=== Television ===
Television

Fielder Cook – Hallmark Hall of Fame for "Teacher, Teacher"

- Joel Banow – First Manned Landing on the Moon (CBS News coverage)
- Paul Bogart – CBS Playhouse for "Shadow Game"
- Gower Champion – An Evening with Julie Andrews and Harry Belafonte
- William Graham – CBS Playhouse for "Sadbird"
- Marty Pasetta – The H Andrew Williams Magic Lantern Show
- Daniel Petrie – Silent Night, Lonely Night
- Boris Sagal – Destiny of a Spy
- George Schaefer – Hallmark Hall of Fame for The File on Devlin
- Gordon Wiles – Rowan & Martin's Laugh-In

=== D.W. Griffith Award ===
- Fred Zinnemann
