= 22nd Primetime Emmy Awards =

1970 American television programming awards

- Date: June 7, 1970
- Location: Century Plaza Hotel, Los Angeles, California
- Presented by: Academy of Television Arts and Sciences
- Hosted by: David Frost; Danny Thomas

Highlights
- Most awards: Marcus Welby, M.D. Room 222 (3)
- Most nominations: Marcus Welby, M.D. (6)
- Outstanding Comedy Series: My World and Welcome to It
- Outstanding Dramatic Series: Marcus Welby, M.D.
- Outstanding Dramatic Program: Hallmark Hall of Fame: "A Storm in Summer"
- Outstanding Variety or Musical Series: The David Frost Show

Television/radio coverage
- Network: ABC

The 22nd Emmy Awards, later known as the 22nd Primetime Emmy Awards, were handed out on June 7, 1970. The ceremony was hosted by David Frost and Danny Thomas. 24 awards were presented. Winners are listed in bold and series' networks are in parentheses.

The top shows of the night were My World and Welcome to It, and Marcus Welby, M.D.. Marcus Welby, M.D., and Room 222 each won three major awards. My World and Welcome to It won Outstanding Comedy Series, but was cancelled after its first season. It is currently the most recent series to win for Outstanding Comedy Series in the show's one and only season. Another oddity in the Outstanding Comedy Series category was that not one show nominated the previous year was nominated this year. This marks the last time that either series category (comedy or drama) has had this occur.

Gail Fisher from Mannix became the first black woman to win an Emmy Award in any category. Susan Hampshire from The Forsyte Saga became the first Lead Actress, Drama to win outside the Big Three television networks - from the NET network. Her win was also the first for a British produced programme.

== Winners and nominees ==
=== Programs ===
Programs
**Outstanding Comedy Series**: **My World and Welcome to It (NBC)**; The Bill Cosby Show (NBC); The Courtship of Eddie's Father (ABC); Love, American Style (ABC); Room 222 (ABC)	**Outstanding Dramatic Series**: **Marcus Welby, M.D. (ABC)**; The Forsyte Saga (NET); Ironside (NBC); The Mod Squad (ABC); NET Playhouse (NET); The Name of the Game (NBC)
**Outstanding Variety or Musical Series**: **The David Frost Show (NBC)**; The Carol Burnett Show (CBS); The Dean Martin Comedy Hour (NBC); The Dick Cavett Show (ABC); Rowan & Martin's Laugh-In (NBC)	**Outstanding Variety or Musical Program - Variety and Popular Music**: **Annie, the Women in the Life of a Man (CBS)**; Kraft Music Hall: "The Friars Club 'Roasts' Jack Benny" (NBC); Kraft Music Hall: "The Sound of Burt Bacharach" (NBC); The Second Bill Cosby Special (NBC); Sinatra (CBS)
**Outstanding Variety or Musical Program - Classical Music**: **Cinderella (NET)**; S. Hurok Presents (CBS); Sounds of Summer: The Blossom Music Center with Pierre Boulez (NET); The Switched-On Symphony (NBC)	**Outstanding Achievement in Daytime Programming - Programs**: **Today (NBC)**; The Galloping Gourmet (Syndicated)
**Outstanding Achievement in Sports Programming**: **ABC's Wide World of Sports (ABC) – Roone Arledge**; **Pro-Bowl Game (ABC) – Robert R. Forte**; **The NFL Games (CBS) – William Fitts**; ABC's Wide World of Sports (ABC) – Robert Riger; 1969 World Series (NBC) – Lou Kusserow	**Outstanding Children's Program**: **Sesame Street (NET)**; Walt Disney's Wonderful World of Color (NBC)
**Outstanding Dramatic Program**: **Hallmark Hall of Fame: "A Storm in Summer" (NBC)**; The ABC Wednesday Night Movie (ABC): "Marcus Welby, M.D."; David Copperfield (NBC); NBC World Premiere Movie: "My Sweet Charlie" (NBC)	**Outstanding New Series**: **Room 222 (ABC)**; The Bill Cosby Show (NBC); The Forsyte Saga (NET); Marcus Welby, M.D. (ABC); Sesame Street (NET)

=== Acting ===
==== Lead performances ====
Acting
**Outstanding Continued Performance** **by an Actor in a Leading Role in a Comedy Series**: **William Windom as John Monroe in My World and Welcome to It (NBC)**; Bill Cosby as Chet Kincaid in The Bill Cosby Show (NBC); Lloyd Haynes as Pete Dixon in Room 222 (ABC)	**Outstanding Continued Performance** **by an Actress in a Leading Role in a Comedy Series**: **Hope Lange as Carolyn Muir in The Ghost & Mrs. Muir (ABC)**; Elizabeth Montgomery as Samantha Stephens in Bewitched (ABC); Marlo Thomas as Ann Marie in That Girl (ABC)
**Outstanding Continued Performance** **by an Actor in a Leading Role in a Dramatic Series**: **Robert Young as Dr. Marcus Welby in Marcus Welby, M.D. (ABC)**; Raymond Burr as Robert T. Ironside in Ironside (NBC); Mike Connors as Joe Mannix in Mannix (CBS); Robert Wagner as Alexander Mundy in It Takes a Thief (ABC)	**Outstanding Continued Performance** **by an Actress in a Leading Role in a Dramatic Series**: **Susan Hampshire as Fleur Mont née Forsyte in The Forsyte Saga (NET)**; Joan Blondell as Lottie Hatfield in Here Come the Brides (ABC); Peggy Lipton as Julie Barnes in The Mod Squad (ABC)

==== Supporting performances ====
**Outstanding Performance by an Actor in a Supporting Role in a Comedy**: **Michael Constantine as Principal Seymour Kaufman in Room 222 (ABC)**; Werner Klemperer as Col. Wilhelm Klink in Hogan's Heroes (CBS); Charles Nelson Reilly as Claymore Gregg in The Ghost & Mrs. Muir (ABC)	**Outstanding Performance by an Actress in a Supporting Role in a Comedy**: **Karen Valentine as Alice Johnson in Room 222 (ABC)**; Agnes Moorehead as Endora in Bewitched (ABC); Lurene Tuttle as Hannah Yarby in Julia (ABC)
**Outstanding Performance by an Actor in a Supporting Role in a Drama**: **James Brolin as Dr. Steven Kiley in Marcus Welby, M.D. (ABC)**; Tige Andrews as Capt. Adam Greer in The Mod Squad (ABC); Greg Morris as Barney Collier in Mission: Impossible (CBS)	**Outstanding Performance by an Actress in a Supporting Role in a Drama**: **Gail Fisher as Peggy Fair in Mannix (CBS)**; Barbara Anderson as Officer Eve Whitfield in Ironside (NBC); Susan Saint James as Peggy Maxwell in The Name of the Game (NBC)

==== Single performances ====
**Outstanding Single Performance by an Actor in a Leading Role**: **Peter Ustinov as Abel Shaddick in Hallmark Hall of Fame: "A Storm in Summer" (NBC)**; Al Freeman Jr. as Charles Roberts in My Sweet Charlie (NBC); Laurence Olivier as Mr. Creakle in David Copperfield (NBC)	**Outstanding Single Performance by an Actress in a Leading Role**: **Patty Duke as Marlene Chambers in My Sweet Charlie (NBC)**; Edith Evans as Aunt Betsy Trotwood in David Copperfield (NBC); Shirley Jones as Katherine Johnson in Silent Night, Lonely Night (NBC)

=== Directing ===
Directing
**Outstanding Directorial Achievement in Variety, Comedy or Music**: **Kraft Music Hall: "The Sound of Burt Bacharach" (NBC) – Dwight Hemion**; The Second Bill Cosby Special (NBC) – Seymour Berns; Young People's Concerts: Berlioz Takes a Trip (CBS) – Roger Englander	**Outstanding Directorial Achievement in Drama**: **CBS Playhouse: "Shadow Game" (CBS) – Paul Bogart**; Hallmark Hall of Fame: "A Storm in Summer" (NBC) – Buzz Kulik; NBC World Premiere Movie: "My Sweet Charlie" (NBC) – Lamont Johnson

=== Writing ===
Writing
**Outstanding Writing Achievement in Comedy, Variety or Music**: **Annie, the Women in the Life of a Man (CBS)**; Rowan & Martin's Laugh-In (NBC): "Buddy Hackett"; Rowan & Martin's Laugh-In (NBC): "Nancy Sinatra"	**Outstanding Writing Achievement in Drama**: **NBC World Premiere Movie: "My Sweet Charlie" (NBC) – Richard Levinson and William Link**; The ABC Wednesday Night Movie: "Marcus Welby, M.D." (ABC) – Don Mankiewicz; CBS Playhouse: "Sadbird" (CBS) – George Bellak

== Most major nominations ==
Networks with multiple major nominations (Note: "Major" constitutes the categories listed above: Program, Acting, Directing, and Writing. Does not include the technical categories.)
Network	Number of Nominations
NBC	32
ABC	28
CBS	9

Programs with multiple major nominations
Program	Category	Network	Number of Nominations
Marcus Welby, M.D.	Drama	ABC	6
My Sweet Charlie	Special	NBC	5
Room 222	Comedy	ABC	5
The Bill Cosby Show	Comedy	NBC	3
David Copperfield	Special	NBC	3
The Forsyte Saga	Drama	NET	3
Ironside	Drama	NBC	3
The Mod Squad	Drama	ABC	3
Rowan & Martin's Laugh-In	Variety	NBC	3
A Storm in Summer	Special	NBC	3
Annie, the Women in the Life of a Man	Variety	CBS	2
Bewitched	Comedy	ABC	2
The Ghost and Mrs. Muir	Comedy	ABC	2
Mannix	Drama	CBS	2
My World and Welcome to It	Comedy	NBC	2
The Name of the Game	Drama	NBC	2
The Second Bill Cosby Special	Variety	NBC	2
Sesame Street	Children's	NET	2
The Sound of Burt Bacharach	Variety	NBC	2
Wide World of Sports	Sports	ABC	2

== Most major awards ==
Networks with multiple major awards
Network	Number of Awards
ABC	9
NBC	9
CBS	5
NET	3

Programs with multiple major awards
Program	Category	Network	Number of Awards
Marcus Welby, M.D.	Drama	ABC	3
Room 222	Comedy	ABC	3
Annie, the Women in the Life of a Man	Variety	CBS	2
My Sweet Charlie	Special	NBC	2
My World and Welcome to It	Comedy	NBC	2
A Storm in Summer	Special	NBC	2
