= Appalachian Autumn =

- CBS Playhouse episode
- Episode no.: Season 3 Episode 1
- Directed by: William A. Graham
- Written by: Earl Hamner, Jr.
- Original air date: October 7, 1969

Episode chronology
← Previous "Shadow Game"	Next → "Sadbird"

"Appalachian Autumn" is the first television play episode of the third season of the American television series CBS Playhouse. It is a drama about the poverty of the fictional coal mining town of Harper's Gap in West Virginia, and the attempts of a VISTA worker to assist the people of the town.

"Appalachian Autumn" was broadcast October 7, 1969, and received technical Emmy awards for lighting. Reviews of the episode were mixed, with Rick Du Brow in the Lexington, NC Dispatch calling it "still worth tuning in" in spite of CBS Playhouse "being on its soapbox." The New York Times critic Jack Gould noted the episode was "not the pillar of dramatic success; nor is it immune to dramatic excess," but praised the broadcast on how it "comes to grips with an issue such as the reality of poor whites in Appalachia."

Writer Earl Hamner, Jr. would later use this episode as the framework for his award-winning television series The Waltons.

Actor Phillip Alford, a child during the filming, recounted his experience filming "Appalachian Autumn" in the book Growing Up on the Set, noting that one scene resulted in his getting a concussion.
