= List of Webster episodes =

Webster is an American sitcom produced by Emmanuel Lewis Entertainment Enterprises, Georgian Bay Productions, and Paramount Television, from 1983 to 1989, and was split into two different eras: The ABC era, which ran from 1983 to 1987, and the First-run syndication era, which ran from 1987 to 1989. A total of 150 episodes were produced (100 for ABC, and 50 for First-run syndication). Of the 150 episodes, six episodes, all from the ABC era, did not air until syndication. (These episodes—two from season 2 and four from season 3—are listed here with the seasons during which they were produced even though subsequent episodes of the following seasons aired earlier.) Some of the unaired episodes made their debut on ABC Daytime, which aired reruns of the show from December 22, 1986 to July 3, 1987.

== Series overview ==
Season	Episodes	Originally released			Rank	Rating
Season	Episodes	First released	Last released	Network	Rank	Rating
1	22	September 16, 1983	May 4, 1984	ABC	25	17.2 (Tied with The CBS Tuesday Night Movie, Alice, Knight Rider and Hardcastle and McCormick)
2	26	September 21, 1984	April 5, 1985 (+ 2 aired later)	ABC	25	17.0 (Tied with Monday Night Football and Remington Steele)
3	29	September 20, 1985	May 2, 1986 (+ 4 aired later)	ABC	—N/a	—N/a
4	23	September 19, 1986	May 8, 1987	ABC	—N/a	—N/a
5	25	September 21, 1987	April 11, 1988	Syndicated	—N/a	—N/a
6	25	September 9, 1988	March 10, 1989	Syndicated	—N/a	—N/a

Broadcast history

- September 1983–March 1985, ABC Friday 8:30–9:00
- March 1985–March 1987, ABC Friday 8:00–8:30
- March 1987–April 1987, ABC Friday 8:30–9:00
- May 1987, ABC Friday 8:00–8:30
- June 1987–August 1987, ABC Saturday 8:00–8:30
- August 1987–September 1987, ABC Friday 8:00–8:30

== Episodes ==
=== Season 1 (1983–84) ===
No. overall	No. in season	Title	Directed by	Written by	Original release date	Prod. code
1	1	"Another Ballgame"	Joel Zwick	Stu Silver	September 16, 1983	001
In the pilot episode, after the untimely death of a young boy's parents, the young boy is sent to live with his father's best friend.
2	2	"Happy Un-Birthday"	Joel Zwick	Stu Silver	September 23, 1983	002
In order to get some extra special attention, Webster makes believe that it is his birthday, and he wants a party.
3	3	"Consulting Adults"	Joel Zwick	Michael Preminger	September 30, 1983	004
Webster tries out for the football team. Katherine is then afraid that Webster will get seriously hurt especially because of his height and build. Also, we learn that Webster is picked to be on the team only because of George's fame in football.
4	4	"Katherine's Swan Song"	Bob Claver	Madeline Sunshine & Steven Sunshine	October 7, 1983	003
Katherine wants to get some attention from Webster and she tries a few things. Meanwhile, Webster's friend is not getting much attention because her mom just had a baby, so she runs away and Webster hides her in his room.
5	5	"Saying Goodbye"	Joel Zwick	Fredi Towbin	October 21, 1983	006
George and Katherine find out that Webster doesn't know that his parents are dead. He originally thought that they had to go away and that they will come back for him, so it's up to George and Katherine to break the news to Webster of what really happened to his parents.
6	6	"The Green-Eyed Monster"	Joel Zwick	Michael Preminger	October 28, 1983	008
Katherine fears that she is getting old because George and Webster play games with a girl named Molly, who is real young and really pretty. In the light of all this, Katherine gets jealous.
7	7	"Second Time Around"	Joel Zwick	Russ Woody	November 4, 1983	007
Thinking that George and Katherine never had an official wedding ceremony, Webster plans to prepare one for them.
8	8	"Travis"	Joel Zwick	Martin Donovan	November 11, 1983	005
It is revealed to George and Katherine why Travis, Webster's late father, chose George to be Webster's godparents and legal guardians if something happened to them.
9	9	"That's Entertainment"	Joel Zwick	Kay Anderson	November 18, 1983	011
Webster goes on a TV-benefit show to sing and dance.
10	10	"Educating Katherine"	Joel Zwick	Susan Borowitz & Richard Raskind	November 25, 1983	012
Katherine gets a taste of the worst being a volunteer art teacher. She feels that she is boring and failing, so Webster tries to help her.
11	11	"Teddy Bear Scare"	Joel Zwick	Russ Woody	December 2, 1983	013
George and Katherine both try and persuade Webster that he can do without his teddy bear, which is lost.
12	12	"A Question of Honor"	Joel Zwick	Madeline Sunshine & Steven Sunshine	December 16, 1983	010
All the blame goes to Webster when his friends try to rob the Tracadero, their hangout.
13	13	"Don't Jump, George"	Joel Zwick	Stu Silver	December 23, 1983	009
Katherine is too obsessed with winning when she appears on a game show.
14	14	"George, the Patient in Spite of Himself"	Joel Zwick	Greg Antonacci	January 6, 1984	014
Webster has to have his tonsils out, so he tries to be tough just like George.
15	15	"Maybe Baby"	Joel Zwick	Roger Garrett	January 13, 1984	016
Webster wants a baby brother or sister so he goes to George and Katherine and asks them for one.
16	16	"Missing"	Joel Zwick	Judy Pioli	January 20, 1984	015
George and Katherine both forget to pick Webster up from school, so he goes with a friend and his parents, leaving a panicking George and Katherine not knowing if something happened to him.
17	17	"Secrets of the Night"	Joel Zwick	David Lerner & Bruce Ferber	January 27, 1984	017
Webster is always nervous and it's resulted with him having a bed-wetting problem.
18	18	"Special Friends"	Joel Zwick	Diane Messina & Lou Messina	February 3, 1984	018
Webster makes a friend when a boy needs a sponsor for the Special Olympics. Special Guest Star: JoJo Starbuck
19	19	"Uncle Phillip"	William P. D'Angelo	Steven Sunshine & Madeline Sunshine	February 24, 1984	019
After previously appearing as himself in "That's Entertainment", Ben Vereen begins a recurring role as Webster's shady uncle, Phillip.
20	20	"More Than a Memory"	Joel Zwick	Fred Fox, Jr.	March 2, 1984	021
Jerry, Katherine's secretary, quits on account of helping Webster run for class president.
21	21	"Dreamland"	Joel Zwick	Bruce Ferber & David Lerner	March 9, 1984	022
Webster gets nightmares because the teacher he has a crush on wants to read his composition aloud. Last episode of season one to be produced.
22	22	"Webster Long: Part 1"	Joel Zwick	Steven Sunshine & Madeline Sunshine	May 4, 1984	020
Webster's Uncle Phillip, his last surviving relative, comes up to the apartment to take Webster to live with him. The Papadapolises do not think that Uncle Phil can take care of Webster the way they can, so Uncle Phil threatens to take them to court for custody. The opening credits change. Although not the last episode of season one to be produced, it aired as the last episode and is the first part of a 3-episode story that concludes with the first two episodes of season two.

=== Season 2 (1984–85) ===
No. overall	No. in season	Title	Directed by	Written by	Original release date	Prod. code
23	1	"Webster Long: Part 2"	Joel Zwick	Madeline Sunshine & Steven Sunshine	September 21, 1984	023
Uncle Phil and the Papadapolises all go to court to battle for custody of Webster. Guests James Avery and Ben Vereen can also be seen together in the Fresh Prince of Bel-Air episode "Papa's Got a Brand New Excuse".
24	2	"Webster Long: Part 3"	Joel Zwick	Madeline Sunshine & Steven Sunshine	September 28, 1984	024
After losing the court case, Uncle Phil decides to run away to Atlanta, Georgia without consulting George and Katherine.
25	3	"The Great Walnutto"	Joel Zwick	Mark Masouka	October 12, 1984	025
Webster helps the school janitor go back to being a magician.
26	4	"Knock, Knock"	Joel Zwick	Bruce Ferber & David Lerner	October 19, 1984	026
Webster and his female friend are caught looking at each other naked. Katherine has a tough time trying to explain that they were only curious when she talks to the friend's mother.
27	5	"Burn Out"	Joel Zwick	Judy Pioli	October 26, 1984	027
Webster gets congratulated when he saves George and Katherine from the apartment's fire. Little do they know that Webster actually caused the fire by playing with a chemistry set that he was not supposed to play with. This was the last episode in the apartment.
28	6	"Moving On"	Joel Zwick	Madeline Sunshine & Steven Sunshine	November 2, 1984	030
Mystery and wonder describe the new home George and Katherine are going to rent: a Victorian house replete with secret walls, openings, and more. Also, Webster, Katherine, and George all want to know why the owners don't want anybody to go near their runaway daughter's room.
29	7	"You Can't Go Home Again"	Joel Zwick	Lee H. Grant	November 9, 1984	033
George is called upon to help a losing football team, just when he is about to retire.
30	8	"Thanksgiving Show"	Joel Zwick	Mark Masouka	November 16, 1984	031
Webster, George, and Katherine are all trying to have a peaceful Thanksgiving. But things don't turn out the way they plan when George's aggressive father and Katherine's snobby mother arrive for Thanksgiving dinner.
31	9	"God Bless the Child"	Joel Zwick	Bruce Ferber & David Lerner	November 23, 1984	029
Webster gets angry at God when he realizes that God took his mommy and daddy away.
32	10	"Too Much Class"	Joel Zwick	Daryl Nickens	November 30, 1984	034
After Webster transfers to an advanced learning class, his grades start to slip. In this episode it was mentioned that John Hanson was the 1st president of the United States.
33	11	"To Tell the Truth"	Joel Zwick	Bruce Ferber & David Lerner	December 7, 1984	036
Katherine is extremely embarrassed when Webster announces that she was once under the care of a psychiatrist.
34	12	"Katherine Fights City Hall"	Joel Zwick	Arnold Kane	December 14, 1984	028
The Papadapolises and Webster try to save the Tracadero diner from being demolished. First episode taped in the new house, but the seventh aired.
35	13	"It's a Dog's Life"	Joel Zwick	Mark Masouka	January 4, 1985	035
George and Katherine will not let Webster get a dog, so he tries to con Uncle Phil into getting him one without telling George and Katherine.
36	14	"Runaway"	Joel Zwick	Steven Sunshine & Madeline Sunshine	January 11, 1985	037
After she ran away seven years ago, Bill and Cassie's daughter returns to her parents.
37	15	"Keep on Truckin', Papa"	Joel Zwick	Mark Masouka	January 18, 1985	039
George and Katherine find a job for George's visiting father....a truck driver.
38	16	"The Uh-Oh Feeling"	Joel Zwick	Madeline Sunshine & Steven Sunshine	January 25, 1985	032
Webster, on his way back to the classroom, overhears his friend Beth (Alison Sweeney) getting molested by a substitute teacher. After driving the information out of her, he tries to convince her to tell an adult, particularly her mother (Meredith MacRae).
39	17	"Strike Up the Band"	Joel Zwick	Ross Brown	February 1, 1985	038
Webster meets Diahann Carroll, who is at Webster's school to raise money to bring musical instruments to the school district.
40	18	"In the Family Way: Part 1"	Joel Zwick	Madeline Sunshine & Steven Sunshine	February 8, 1985	040
Katherine has been acting strange around George and Webster and they both find out that she is pregnant.
41	19	"In the Family Way: Part 2"	Joel Zwick	Joel Zwick	February 15, 1985	041
Katherine thinks about life with another baby and then examines the possibility of abortion.
42	20	"What is Art?"	Joel Zwick	Lee H. Grant	February 22, 1985	042
Webster makes a mistake by accidentally recycling Uncle Phil's tin can sculpture.
43	21	"Best of Friends"	Joel Zwick	Jim Mulligan	March 15, 1985	043
Webster isn't speaking to his best friend David, and George hopes if he apologizes to his friend Bill (with whom he also had a disagreement during a board game), that Webster will make up with his friend too.
44	22	"It's Academic"	Joel Zwick	Bruce Ferber & David Lerner	March 22, 1985	044
Katherine develops a desire for a visiting college professor.
45	23	"Be It Ever So Humble"	Joel Zwick	Daryl Nickens	March 29, 1985	045
Bill keeps playing pranks on George, and it gets to the point where they are at odds.
46	24	"The Best Thing I Can Be"	Tom Trbovich	Madeline Sunshine & Steven Sunshine	April 5, 1985	046
After going to an amusement park, Webster is deeply upset on account of his height.
47	25	"Blast from the Past: Part 1"	Peter Baldwin	Madeline Sunshine & Steven Sunshine	February 24, 1987	047
Webster gets trapped in a secret room that appears to have no way out. Meanwhile, the gang reminisces through flashbacks to old episodes. This episode did not air until ABC Daytime and syndication. This two-parter is also known as "Flashback".
48	26	"Blast from the Past: Part 2"	Peter Baldwin	Madeline Sunshine & Steven Sunshine	February 25, 1987	048
As the gang are still reminiscing from past shows, they realize that they haven't seen Webster around the house and they start to get worried, not knowing that he is still in the secret room. This episode did not air until ABC Daytime and syndication.

=== Season 3 (1985–86) ===
No. overall	No. in season	Title	Directed by	Written by	Original release date	Prod. code
49 50	1 2	"How the West Was Once"	Joel Zwick	Bruce Johnson, Dave Hackel, April Kelly & William P. D'Angelo	September 20, 1985	049-050
Part 1: The Papadapolises visit Lizard Flatz, Arizona and encounter Dusty, a man with interesting stories, a ranch, and Moonhunter, a horse that seems to be a legend, but ends up a reality after saving Webster from a rattlesnake. Moonhunter is caught by some greedy no-gooders, and Webster is almost killed. Part 2: George wants to live on the ranch, and Webster wants to save Moonhunter and set him free, but after all the excitement, they decide to head back to Chicago. This two-parter originally aired as a one-hour episode. It was broken into two parts and edited for ABC Daytime and syndication.
51	3	"And Baby Makes Breakfast"	Joel Zwick	Ann L. Gibbs & Joel Kimmel	September 27, 1985	051
For a class project, Webster gets married and ends up with a bunch of problems with himself and his snotty, controlling "wife".
52	4	"Big Problems"	Joel Zwick	April Kelly	October 4, 1985	052
Webster's friend Rob is upset because he feels that he is too tall.
53	5	"Alien"	Joel Zwick	Dave Hackel	October 11, 1985	056
Webster's friend Rob picks up a tabloid and asks him some questions from it. Based on his responses, the tabloid states that Webster is an alien from Jupiter, and he starts to believe it.
54	6	"Parent Trap"	Joel Zwick	Ken Kuta	October 18, 1985	055
As a lesson in teaching Webster responsibility, George and Katherine switch roles to where they are the kids, and Webster is the parent.
55	7	"Good Grief"	Joel Zwick	April Kelly	October 25, 1985	061
Katherine is very upset when she finds out that her mother has died.
56	8	"One More Shot"	Joel Zwick	Ken Kuta	November 1, 1985	053
George takes Webster to a New York Knicks game and introduces him to Patrick Ewing.
57	9	"Great Expectations: Part 1"	Joel Zwick	Ann L. Gibbs & Joel Kimmel	November 8, 1985	057
Webster goes to Hollywood with Uncle Phil and his girlfriend. Matters turn worse after Uncle Phil's girlfriend cheats with Phil's producer. Meanwhile, Katherine gets sick while she and George are on their second honeymoon.
58	10	"Great Expectations: Part 2"	Joel Zwick	Joel Kimmel & Ann L. Gibbs	November 15, 1985	058
After cheating on Phil, the producer gives Phil's part to his now ex-girlfriend, which leaves Phil fired. Meanwhile, at George and Katherine's second honeymoon the power and heat go off.
59	11	"Who's to Blame"	Joel Zwick	Gene Braunstein & Bob Perlow	November 22, 1985	060
Robbers break into the house while Webster is home alone and he has to know how to act.
60	12	"Chained"	Shelley Jensen	April Kelly	November 29, 1985	062
Webster gets a chain letter. George throws it away and things mysteriously go wrong: Webster does bad on his test, there is a spider, and Papa Papadapolis falls down the stairs.
61	13	"The Triangle"	Joel Zwick	Judy Pioli	December 6, 1985	054
Webster takes a picture and shows it to Katherine, who then starts to think that a neighbor is having an affair.
62	14	"The Truth Hurts"	Shelley Jensen	Daryl G. Nickens & Mike Scott	December 13, 1985	063
Webster makes Katherine a dress for her birthday. She says that she likes it, but avoids wearing it when she is asked to put it on when they go out. She then tells Webster how she really feels about her gift.
63	15	"Hello, I Must be Going"	Joel Zwick	Mike Scott & Daryl G. Nickens	January 10, 1986	059
Webster tries to set up Katherine's Aunt Charlotte and Papa Papadapolis.
64	16	"That's Rich"	Joel Zwick	Ken Kuta	January 17, 1986	064
Webster learns that you can be rich without having a lot of money after he gets struck with lottery fever.
65	17	"TV or Not TV"	Joel Zwick	April Kelly & Dave Hackel	January 24, 1986	065
When George is assigned to children's sports after a popular segment on Webster's hockey team, he worries his career will be damaged.
66	18	"Borrowed Time"	Joel Zwick	Judy Pioli	January 31, 1986	066
Rob's dad kidnaps him, and Webster attempts to rally up support to try to find him.
67	19	"A Friend in Need"	Shelley Jensen	Ann L. Gibbs & Joel Kimmel	February 7, 1986	068
Jerry dresses up like a clown and takes Webster to the leukemia ward at the children's hospital, where he makes a new friend and realizes how lucky he is to be healthy.
68	20	"Love Papadapolis Style"	Joel Zwick	Dave Hackel	February 14, 1986	067
Webster falls in love with a girl on Valentine's Day and he thinks she's taken, but he tries to ask her out to a Valentine's party anyway. Title is a play on the TV show Love, American Style, another ABC sitcom that was produced by Paramount Television.
69	21	"Almost Home"	Joel Zwick	Steven Sunshine & Madeline Sunshine	February 21, 1986	069
Webster visits his Uncle Jack, who runs a foster home with a woman, but a conflict may force him to quit the home. This was intended to be the pilot for a spin-off series.
70	22	"Farewell to Arms"	Joel Zwick	Bob Perlow & Gene Braunstein	March 7, 1986	070
Webster asks for permission to buy a BB gun and, after getting one, accidentally kills a bird. He takes on the responsibility of raising the bird's babies.
71	23	"There Goes the Bride"	Joel Zwick	Daryl G. Nickens & Mike Scott	March 14, 1986	071
Katherine's aunt is getting married, and George and Katherine decide to reenact their wedding vows.
72	24	"Gotcha"	Art Dielhenn	Lee H. Grant	March 28, 1986	072
Webster and Katherine hatch a scheme to try and rid a habit that George has.
73	25	"My Family's Honor"	Gerren Keith	Janette Kotichas Burleigh & Teena M. Heim	May 2, 1986	075
Webster and Katherine both end up cheating on some school-related projects at the same time.
74	26	"Special Delivery"	Art Dielhenn	Judy Pioli	June 4, 1987	073
George and Katherine both hire a maid who happens to be pregnant and goes into labor. This episode did not air until ABC Daytime and syndication. This episode is also known as "Maid for Each Other".
75	27	"Cuckoo's Nest"	Gerren Keith	Doodles DuBois	January 24, 1988	074
Katherine hosts a therapy session at the house. This episode did not air until syndication. This was the only previously unaired episode not to air on ABC Daytime. Note: This was Cathryn Damon's (Cassie Parker) and Eugene Roche's (Bill Parker) final appearance on the show. Cathryn Damon passed away from ovarian cancer eight months after this episode was aired in syndication.
76	28	"Rear View Mirror: Part 1"	Art Dielhenn	Dave Hackel & April Kelly	March 30, 1987	076
Webster and Papa Papadapolis reminisce through flashbacks. Then, they find out that George and Katherine are caught in a hurricane. This episode did not air until ABC Daytime and syndication.
77	29	"Rear View Mirror: Part 2"	Art Dielhenn	Dave Hackel & April Kelly	March 31, 1987	077
As they continue to reminisce, Webster, Papa Papadapolis and Jerry receive news that George and Katherine have both survived the hurricane. This episode did not air until ABC Daytime and syndication.

=== Season 4 (1986–87) ===
No. overall	No. in season	Title	Directed by	Written by	Original release date	Prod. code
78	1	"McGruff"	Art Dielhenn	Bob Brunner & Ken Hecht	September 19, 1986	078
Webster starts buying his lunch, and the school bully keeps taking Webster's money. George and Katherine attempt to end the extortion through a class presentation with a police officer in a dog costume.
79	2	"The Landlords"	Art Dielhenn	Ken Hecht & Bob Brunner	September 26, 1986	079
The Papadapolis family rents a room to a man (Avner Eisenberg) after Cassie and Bill have officially moved out, not knowing that he is a clown.
80	3	"The Derby"	Mel Ferber	Nancy Steen & Neil Thompson	October 3, 1986	080
George is so obsessed with Webster winning a derby, that he builds the car without him, hurting his feelings since Webster wanted to build the car together.
81	4	"A Run for the Money"	Art Dielhenn	Jane Gould & Shelly Landau	October 17, 1986	084
Katherine decides to run a 6-mile marathon for a fundraiser, but a can of tomato juice falls on her foot, so Webster takes on the challenge himself.
82	5	"Read It and Weep"	Dick Martin	Fred Rubin	October 24, 1986	082
The family learns that Papa Papadapolis is illiterate, and he is greatly ashamed of it. To try to ease the tension, George and Katherine enroll him in a class, after some manipulation and persuasion.
83	6	"Witchbusters"	Lee Bernhardi	Jane Gould & Shelly Landau	October 31, 1986	085
Webster discovers that a new neighbor who is rumored to be a witch whose house he and a friend break into is really lonely and needs someone to care for her.
84	7	"The Tribute"	Lee Bernhardi	Neil Thompson & Nancy Steen	November 7, 1986	088
Webster talks about his late father when the school staff is looking to name the campus after a famous sports hero. Ron Reagan guest-stars.
85	8	"Kiss Me, Kate"	Lee Bernhardi	Barry Rubinowitz	November 14, 1986	086
A former teammate of George's makes a pass at Katherine, and Webster witnesses it.
86	9	"Play Ball"	Art Dielhenn	Kenny Rich	November 21, 1986	087
Katherine coaches Webster's baseball team and assigns him to right field, but he has his heart set on pitching.
87	10	"The Big Sleepover"	Lee Bernhardi	Shelly Landau & Jane Gould	December 5, 1986	081
Webster invites a girl (Caryn Ward) over for a sleepover.
88	11	"The Man in the Red Flannel Suit"	Lee Bernhardi	Barry Gold	December 12, 1986	090
Supposed to be Santa Claus for a Christmas parade, George loses his part and is upset about it.
89	12	"Secrets"	Lee Bernhardi	Robert Jayson & A. Dudley Johnson, Jr.	January 9, 1987	091
George gets angry after finding out that the son (Brandon Call) of his new station manager (David Ruprecht) is bullying Webster.
90	13	"Leave It to Diva"	Lee Bernhardi	John B. Collins	January 16, 1987	094
George and Katherine have different ideas on how to celebrate Webster's birthday: George wants to take him to a professional wrestling match, and Katherine wants to take him to an opera. Julia Migenes guest-stars.
91	14	"A Test of Characters"	Barbara Schultz	Story by : Paul Lander & Susan Kessler; Teleplay by : Janna Lowell	January 23, 1987	089
A teacher takes credit for Webster's winning photograph.
92	15	"Freedom of the Press"	Lee Bernhardi	Barry Gold	January 30, 1987	095
Webster writes stories about teachers' love lives in the school paper, but the information puts Katherine's teaching job at risk because it is gossip which Webster overhears from another boy.
93	16	"Honor Thy Grandfather"	Lee Bernhardi	Ken Kuta	February 6, 1987	093
When children make fun of Papa Papadapolis at the community center, Webster gets fed up and decided to bail on an upcoming banquet there to save face.
94	17	"Seeing It Through"	Art Dielhenn	Robert Jayson & A. Dudley Johnson, Jr.	February 13, 1987	083
Webster gets a job walking neighborhood dogs, and Katherine tries to fix things around the house. This episode is also known as "It's a Dog-Eat-Dog World".
95	18	"Our Song"	Lee Bernhardi	Neil Thompson & Nancy Steen	February 20, 1987	098
Webster and Jerry both invite the Four Tops to perform at George and Katherine's anniversary party. The first of three appearances in the series by the Four Tops, followed by "The Four Tops: The Sequel" in season 5 and "Thanksgiving with the Four Tops" in season 6.
96	19	"The K.O. Kid"	Lee Bernhardi	Sylvia Allen & Susan Lee	February 27, 1987	092
Webster gets an autograph from Mike Tyson on a pair of boxing gloves, but the autograph accidentally gets wiped off.
97	20	"Games People Play"	Lee Bernhardi	Fred Rubin	March 6, 1987	096
Trouble starts to brew when a girl suggests a kissing game at Webster's party.
98	21	"Katherine the Brave"	Lee Bernhardi	Robert Jayson & A. Dudley Johnson, Jr.	March 20, 1987	097
Webster is pressured by his friends to fire Katherine from being their Junior Troops leader.
99	22	"The A++ Parents"	Lee Bernhardi	Shelly Landau & Jane Gould	March 27, 1987	099
Webster writes an essay praising and appreciating the love and leadership that George and Katherine have given him throughout the years, until he feels guilty he doesn't rather write about his birth parents.
100	23	"What Price Friendship?"	Lee Bernhardi	Brad Isaacs	May 8, 1987	100
Two of Webster's friends hurt him and take his hard-earned money. Final episode to be aired on (and produced for) ABC.

=== Season 5 (1987–88) ===
No. overall	No. in season	Title	Directed by	Written by	Original release date	Prod. code
101	1	"San Francisco: Part 1"	Lee Bernhardi	Brad Isaacs	September 21, 1987	101
Webster helps an old man who wants to be reunited with his jazz band in San Francisco.
102	2	"San Francisco: Part 2"	Lee Bernhardi	Bob Brunner & Ken Hecht	September 28, 1987	102
Katherine is accused of extorting Henry's savings after he disappears. Includes the first of Al Fann's two unrelated roles on Webster. He can also be seen in the season 6 episode "Heaven".
103	3	"San Francisco: Part 3"	Lee Bernhardi	Story by : Brad Isaacs; Teleplay by : Bob Brunner & Ken Hecht	October 5, 1987	103
Katherine is bailed out of jail in time to catch Henry's comeback performance.
104	4	"Hello, Nicky"	Lee Bernhardi	Sally Rogers & Buddy Sorrell	October 12, 1987	104
George's nephew Nicky (Corin Nemec) is not too crazy about moving to Nigeria with his family. Note: Corin Nemec's (Nicky Papadapolis) first appearance on the show.
105	5	"Grab Bag"	Lee Bernhardi	Susan Hunter & Liz Martin	October 19, 1987	105
Katherine's purse is stolen, prompting Webster to create a crime prevention program.
106	6	"Breaking Away"	Lee Bernhardi	Barry Gold	October 26, 1987	109
George's fishing plans get in the way of Webster's original plans. Note: Corin Nemec's (Nicky Papadapolis) does not appear in this episode.
107	7	"The Strike"	Lee Bernhardi	Marley Sims & Elyce Wakerman	November 2, 1987	106
George does not approve of the way Webster's teacher teaches.
108	8	"George's Brush with Life"	Lee Bernhardi	Fred Rubin	November 9, 1987	107
George begins to think about his own life upon learning all of his old school friends are dead.
109	9	"The Importance of Being Worthy"	Lee Bernhardi	Fred Rubin	November 16, 1987	108
Webster is upset when funds raised for sports equipment are stolen.
110	10	"A Hell of a Weekend"	Lee Bernhardi	Shelly Landau & Jane Gould	November 30, 1987	110
On a weekend trip, George and Katherine's hosts literally reveal themselves as nudists on a relaxing getaway. Note: Corin Nemec's (Nicky Papadapolis) does not appear in this episode
111	11	"Katherine, the Greek"	Lee Bernhardi	Paul Lander	December 7, 1987	111
Katherine proves surprisingly good at picking football winners when a struggling George asks for her help.
112	12	"Simple Gifts"	Lee Bernhardi	Brad Isaacs	December 14, 1987	113
Katherine disapproves of the overly expensive gifts her wealthy uncle chooses to give the family.
113	13	"The Four Tops: The Sequel"	Lee Bernhardi	Neil Thompson & Nancy Steen	January 4, 1988	112
The Four Tops visit their pal Webster.
114	14	"Nerds Are People, Too"	Lee Bernhardi	Robert Jayson & A. Dudley Johnson, Jr.	January 11, 1988	114
After finding out that a bunch of nerds are in the same school group Webster just joined, he starts to have second thoughts.
115	15	"Taming of the Stew"	Lee Bernhardi	James Belcher & Mary Lynn Kaitiss	January 18, 1988	115
When Katherine demonstrates some of her cooking 'skills' on television, George and Webster try to prevent trouble from brewing. Includes the first of Steve Vinovich's two unrelated appearances on Webster. He can also be seen in the season 6 episode "The Chelsea Cat". Note: Corin Nemec's (Nicky Papadapolis) does not appear in this episode
116	16	"The Couch Potato Must Die"	Lee Bernhardi	Shelly Landau & Jane Gould	January 25, 1988	116
The family takes care of Jerry after he sprains his ankle, and they find out that he's no picnic to wait on, especially given a very big surprise.
117	17	"The Cruise"	Lee Bernhardi	Susan Hunter & Liz Martin	February 1, 1988	117
Katherine and George look back at the time they first met after Webster is assigned a project about famous lovers. Note: Corin Nemec's (Nicky Papadapolis) does not appear in this episode
118	18	"Dial K for Katherine"	Lee Bernhardi	Marley Sims & Elyse Wakerman	February 8, 1988	118
Katherine is frightened when a ex-prisoner she testified against leaves a message on the Papadapolis's answering machine.
119	19	"Homecoming"	Lee Bernhardi	Robert Jayson & A. Dudley Johnson, Jr.	February 15, 1988	119
George discovers two boys on Nicky's football team shouldn't be playing for them.
120	20	"Basketball Blues"	Lee Bernhardi	Stephen Langford	February 22, 1988	120
George encounters a promising basketball player (Billy Hufsey), but he must help him deal with a cocaine addiction.
121	21	"Love Letters"	Lee Bernhardi	Sylvia Alan & Susan H. Lee	March 14, 1988	121
Webster plays matchmaker to a romance-seeking Nicky. Note: Corin Nemec's (Nicky Papadapolis) final appearance on the show.
122	22	"The Talk Show"	Lee Bernhardi	Robert Jayson & A. Dudley Johnson, Jr.	March 21, 1988	122
Katherine's jealousy over George's successful Love in the Afternoon talk show—which he co-hosts with a sexy woman—makes Webster worry divorce may be in their future.
123	23	"Parental Guidance Suggested"	Lee Bernhardi	Fred Rubin	March 28, 1988	123
Wanting to see George's cameo in a movie he's been forbidden to see, Webster sneaks into a showing, but soon regrets his decision.
124	24	"Rub-A-Dub-Dub"	Lee Bernhardi	Neil Thompson & Nancy Steen	April 4, 1988	124
The family wins a spa from a shady dealer who tricks George into endorsing his product.
125	25	"See George Run"	Lee Bernhardi	Susan Hunter & Liz Martin	April 11, 1988	125
George is perplexed when he mysteriously loses an endorsement as a candidate for the Board of Education.

=== Season 6 (1988–89) ===
No. overall	No. in season	Title	Directed by	Written by	Original release date	Prod. code
126	1	"The Wild, Wild, Webster"	Lee Bernhardi	Shelly Landau & Jane Gould	September 9, 1988	132
After being bullied around, Webster fantasizes that he is in the Wild West to take care of his bully.
127	2	"The Painting"	Lee Bernhardi	Marley Sims & Elyce Wakerman	September 16, 1988	128
Katherine is appalled when she sees a nude portrait of her in an art gallery, especially since she never posed that way.
128	3	"The Quiz Show"	Lee Bernhardi	Nancy Steen & Neil Thompson	September 23, 1988	127
Webster and his classmates appear on a TV game show.
129	4	"Papa's Big Romance"	Lee Bernhardi	Susan H. Lee	September 30, 1988	126
The family supports Papa's techniques with a belly dance instructor.
130	5	"The Election"	Lee Bernhardi	Robert Jayson & A. Dudley Johnson, Jr.	October 7, 1988	134
Webster is in charge of campaigning for a class presidential candidate.
131	6	"Sale Away"	Lee Bernhardi	Shelly Landau & Jane Gould	October 14, 1988	129
While gathering things for a garage sale, the family reminisces.
132	7	"The Crush"	Lee Bernhardi	Simon Munteer	October 21, 1988	130
Katherine gives dating advice to a teenager who wants to date an older woman, but she is in for a surprise when the older woman is her.
133	8	"The Chelsea Cat"	Lee Bernhardi	Simon Munteer	October 28, 1988	137
George and Katherine find out that their friend Chelsea is a cat burglar.
134	9	"Take My Cousin, Please"	Lee Bernhardi	Jane Gould & Shelly Landau	November 4, 1988	135
Webster's rich aunt plans on adopting a boy, but Webster thinks that he's just interested in her money.
135	10	"Heaven"	Unknown	Unknown	November 11, 1988	131
Webster is upset when his turtle dies. He then gets even more upset after a friend tells him that the turtle will not be in heaven for him.
136	11	"The Web-touchables: Part 1"	Unknown	Unknown	November 18, 1988	139
Webster daydreams that he's in a 1920s-set musical, with him after a root-beer racketeer.
137	12	"The Web-touchables: Part 2"	Unknown	Unknown	November 25, 1988	140
While his daydream continues, Webster finds that he was set up by a gangster and moves in on the culprit.
138	13	"Rich Man, Poor Man"	Unknown	Unknown	December 2, 1988	133
When Katherine's rich uncle falls in love with the leading lady of a theatrical performance (Susan Blanchard), Webster and Katherine's debuts are in danger.
139	14	"Doing Time at the Community Center"	Unknown	Unknown	December 9, 1988	136
Webster encounters a convicted gambler undergoing rehabilitation, but he has an influence on Webster.
140	15	"Bowled Over"	Unknown	Unknown	December 16, 1988	143
Not realizing what terrible people its sponsors are, Katherine joins a bowling league in hopes of getting them to help a program of hers.
141	16	"Thanksgiving with the Four Tops"	Unknown	Unknown	January 6, 1989	138
The Four Tops, who are friends of George, are invited for Thanksgiving after snow strands them away from home. This episode is also known as "Pass the Potatoes, Obie".
142	17	"Here Come the Jets"	Unknown	Unknown	January 13, 1989	146
Katherine is so determined to get Webster tickets to a sold-out concert by The Jets that she soon finds herself on the wrong side of the law.
143	18	"A Camping We Will Go"	Unknown	Unknown	January 20, 1989	141
To try and spice up their romance and bring back their youth, George and Katherine go camping together.
144	19	"Ticket to Ride"	Unknown	Unknown	January 27, 1989	144
Webster gets a brand new bike, but ends up getting a ticket from a cop.
145	20	"The Science Project"	Unknown	Unknown	February 3, 1989	145
Webster's very smart friend gets depressed because her science project didn't come in as number one.
146	21	"The Gospel Truth"	Unknown	Unknown	February 10, 1989	148
Webster arranges for a gospel group, thinking that it is a rock group, to perform at a party.
147	22	"They Don't Shoot Horses, Do They?"	Unknown	Unknown	February 17, 1989	142
Webster tries to save the life of a racehorse marked for death because it can't compete anymore.
148	23	"The Visitor"	Lee Bernhardi	Jeffrey Bender & Bailey Williams	February 24, 1989	147
Webster's pen pal, an adult butler from England, visits to meet Webster in person.
149	24	"Flood of Memories: The Final Chapter"	Unknown	Unknown	March 3, 1989	149
A flood hits the basement and everyone realizes that most of the contents are pretty much ruined, including family mementos that bring back memories.
150	25	"Webtrek"	Lee Bernhardi	Sylvia Alan	March 10, 1989	150
Webster's video game transports him to a daydream in which he find himself on board the Enterprise from Star Trek: The Next Generation. Special Guest Star: Michael Dorn as Lt. Worf
