= Phillip Alford =

American actor (born 1948)

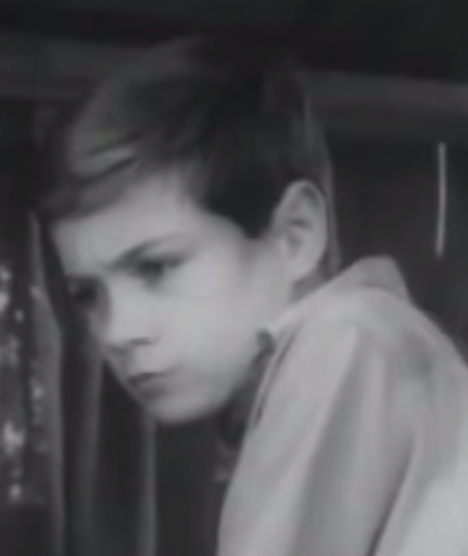
- Alford in To Kill a Mockingbird (1962)
- Born: September 11, 1948 (age 77); Gadsden, Alabama, U.S.
- Occupations: Actor, businessman
- Years active: 1962–1972
- Spouse: Carol Sue Moore (divorced)
- Children: 2

Phillip Alford (born September 11, 1948) is an American former actor best known for his roles as Jem Finch in the 1962 film To Kill a Mockingbird, and Boy Anderson in Shenandoah (1965). Since retiring from acting, he has become a businessman.

== Career ==
Alford appeared in three productions with Birmingham's Town and Gown Civic Theatre, whose director called up Alford's mother to see if her son was interested in auditioning for the part of Jem in To Kill a Mockingbird. Initially Alford had refused, but agreed to audition under the condition that he would miss half a day of school. As one of the three finalists, he was called to New York City for a screen test several weeks later and won the role of Jem Finch.

During the filming, his parents drove to Hollywood to be with him, and his sister became the stand-in actress for Mary Badham, who played Jem's sister, Scout, in the film. He and Badham were constantly bickering and at odds with each other during most of the shoot; at one time after their worst argument, he had planned mischief against her.

Alford's other acting credits include: Bristle Face (1964) (TV); the role of "Boy" in Shenandoah (1965); The Intruders (1970) (TV); and Fair Play (1972) (TV).

== Personal life ==
Since retiring from acting, Alford now works as a businessman in Grenada, Mississippi and stays out of the limelight, but has appeared in a number of film documentaries as an interview partner. He followed his father into the construction business. Alford is divorced and has two children.

== Filmography ==
Year	Title	Role	Notes
1962	To Kill a Mockingbird	Jem Finch	Film debut
1963	The Lloyd Bridges Show	Boford Tyree	1 episode, The Tyrees of Capitol Hill
1964	The Magical World of Disney	Jace Landers	2 episodes, Bristle Face
1965	Shenandoah	Boy Anderson	
1969	CBS Playhouse	Hugh	1 episode Appalachian Autumn
1970	The Virginian	Joe Thurman	1 episode, A Time of Terror
1970	The Intruders	Harold Gilman	TV movie filmed in 1967
1972	Fair Play	Teddy	TV movie, Final film
