= Visions (1976 TV series) =

1976 American TV series

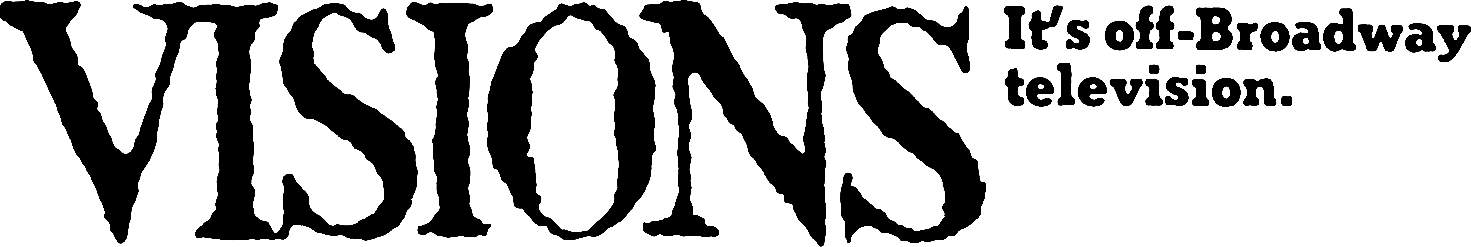
- Genre: Anthology drama
- Creative director: Barbara Schultz
- Country of origin: United States
- Original language: English
- No. of seasons: 3
- No. of episodes: 32

Production
- Executive producer: Barbara Schultz
- Running time: 90–120 minutes
- Production company: KCET & various

Original release
- Network: PBS
- Release: October 21, 1976 – January 26, 1980

Visions is a 90-minute American television weekly anthology series that aired from 1976 to 1978. It was produced by KCET in Los Angeles and televised nationally on PBS. It concentrated on the works of mostly new and some prominent writers, including Cormac McCarthy (The Gardener's Son), Marsha Norman, Jean Shepherd, Luis Valdez, and Robert M. Young. Each episode was written by a different writer and starred a different cast.

Among its stars were Tyne Daly, Charles Durning, Brad Dourif, Morgan Freeman, Carol Kane, Judd Hirsch and Richard Jenkins. Its directors included Maya Angelou, Richard Pearce, Michael Lindsay-Hogg, Paul Bogart, and Gordon Davidson.

Episodes included The War Widow and El Corrido.

It won one primetime Emmy Award and was nominated for three others.

== Episodes ==
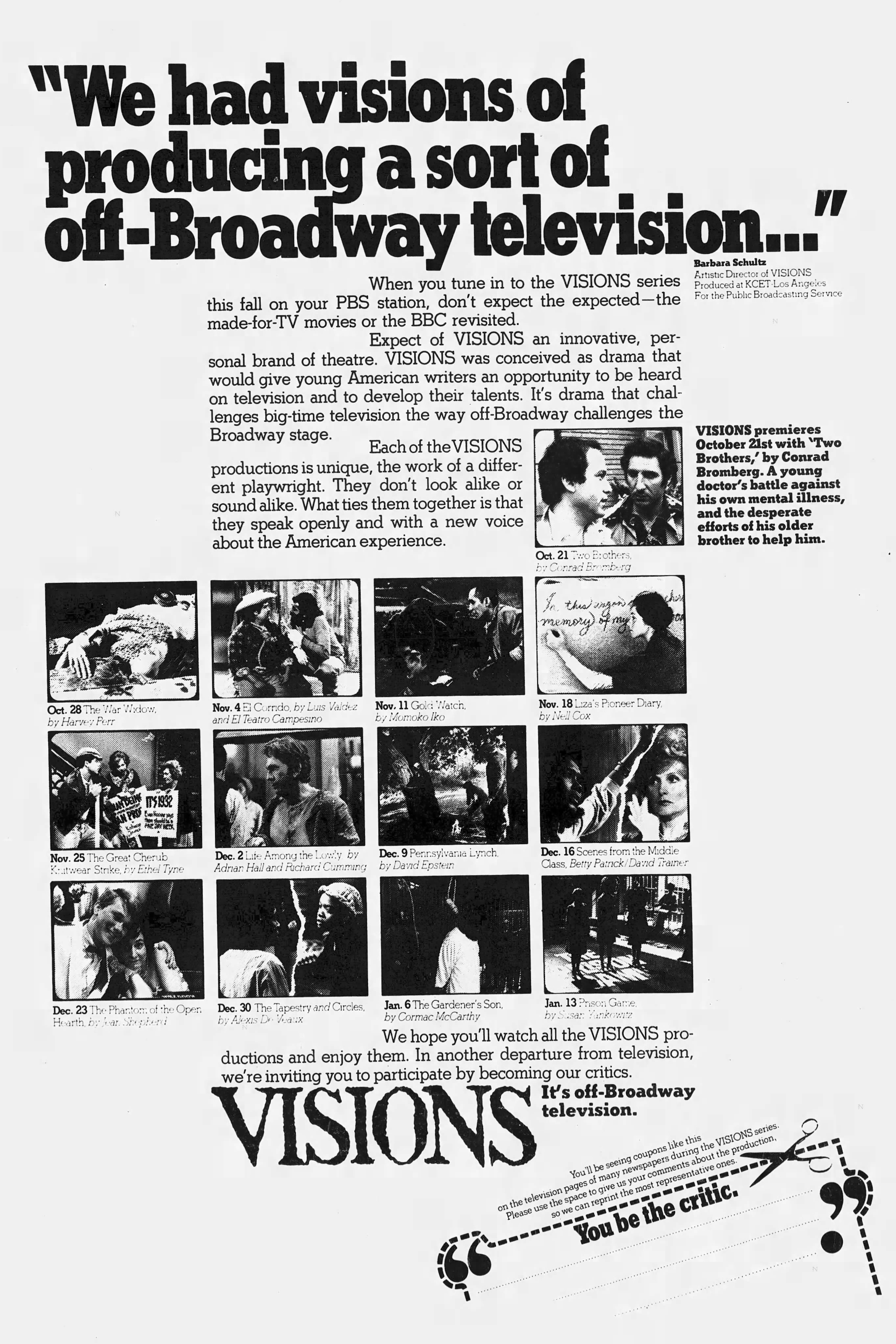
Print ad in the Los Angeles Times on October 19, 1977, promoting the upcoming launch of the Visions series with a calendar of episode titles, screenwriting credits, and premiere dates for the first season

Episode list and credits adapted from The Arts on Television, 1976–1990: Fifteen Years of Cultural Programming (1991).

=== Series overview ===
Series overview for Better Call Saul
Season	Episodes	Originally released	
Season	Episodes	First released	Last released
1	13	October 21, 1976	January 13, 1977
2	10	October 2, 1977	December 4, 1977
3	9	October 9, 1978	January 26, 1980

=== Season 1 (1976–77) ===
Visions season 1 episodes
No. overall	No. in season	Title	Directed by	Written by	Original release date
1	1	Two Brothers	Burt Brinckerhoff	Conrad Bromberg	October 21, 1976
2	2	The War Widow	Paul Bogart	Harvey Perr	October 28, 1976
3	3	El Corrido	Kirk Browning	Luis Valdez	November 4, 1976
4	4	The Gold Watch	Lloyd Richards	Momoko Iko	November 11, 1976
5	5	Liza's Pioneer Diary	Nell Cox	Nell Cox	November 18, 1976
6	6	The Great Cherub Knitwear Strike	George Tyne	Ethel Tyne	November 25, 1976
7	7	Life Among the Lowly	Adrian Hall, Robin Miller	Adrian Hall, Richard Cumming	December 2, 1976
8	8	Pennsylvania Lynch	Jeff Bleckner, Rich Bennewitz	Adrian Hall, Richard Cumming	December 9, 1976
9	9	Scenes from the Middle Class (two plays): Monkey in the Middle and Winter Tour	Rick Bennewitz	Betty Patrick (Monkey in the Middle), David Trainer (Winter Tour)	December 16, 1976
10	10	The Phantom of the Open Hearth	Fred Barzyk, David Loxton	Jean Shepherd	December 23, 1976
11	11	The Tapestry and Circles	Maya Angelou	Alexis De Veaux	December 30, 1976
12	12	The Gardener's Son	Richard Pearce	Cormac McCarthy	January 6, 1977
13	13	Prison Game	Robert Stevens	Susan Yankowitz	January 13, 1977

=== Season 2 (1977) ===
Visions season 2 episodes
No. overall	No. in season	Title	Directed by	Written by	Original release date
14	1	Iowa	Rick Bennewitz	Murray Mednick	October 2, 1977
15	2	Freeman	Lloyd Richards	Phillip Hayes Dean	October 9, 1977
16	3	Alambrista!	Robert M. Young	Robert M. Young	October 16, 1977
17	4	The Dancing Bear	Burt Brinckerhoff	Conrad Bromberg	October 23, 1977
18	5	Over/Under/Sideways/Down	Steve Wax, Eugene Corr	Peter Gessner, Eugene Corr	October 30, 1977
19	6	Pleasantville	Ken Locker	Vicki Polon	November 6, 1977
20	7	You Can Run But You Can't Hide	Rick Bennewitz	Brother Jonathan Ringkamp	November 13, 1977
21	8	All I Could See from Where I Stood	Burt Brinckerhoff	Elizabeth Clark	November 20, 1977
22	9	Nanook Taxi	Edward Folger	Jeffrey Hayes	November 27, 1977
23	10	Secret Space	Rosalyn Regelson	Rosalyn Regelson, Roberta Hodes	December 4, 1977

=== Season 3 (1978–1980) ===
Visions season 1 episodes
No. overall	No. in season	Title	Directed by	Written by	Original release date
24	1	Charlie Smith and the Fritter Tree	David Loxton, Fred Barzyk	Charles Johnson	October 9, 1978
25	2	Escape	Robert Stevens	Jonathan Reynolds	October 16, 1978
26	3	Fans of the Kosko Show	John Desmond	David Epstein	October 23, 1978
27	4	Blessings	Arvin Brown	Murray Mednick	October 30, 1978
28	5	Blackout	Rick Bennewitz	Naomi Foner Gyllenhaal	November 13, 1978
29	6	Ladies in Waiting	Oz Scott, Michael Lindsay-Hogg	Patricia Resnick	January 8, 1979
30	7	Shoes and String	Oz Scott	Ted Shines (Shoes), Alice Childress (String)	January 12, 1980
31	8	It's the Willingness	Gordon Davidson	Marsha Norman	January 19, 1980
32	9	He Wants Her Back	Kaye Braden	Stanton Kaye	January 26, 1980

== Awards ==
Awards and nominations received by Visions
Award	Year	Category	Nominee(s)	Result	Ref.
Cannes Film Festival	1978	Caméra d'Or	Robert M. Young (for Alambrista!)	Won	
Peabody Awards	1977	—	Visions	Won	
Primetime Emmy Awards	1977	Outstanding Achievement in Graphic Design and Title Sequence	Gene Piotrowsky (for The Gardener's Son)	Nominated	
Primetime Emmy Awards	1977	Outstanding Achievement in Lighting Direction	Ken Dettling, Leard Davis (for Gold Watch)	Nominated	
Primetime Emmy Awards	1977	Outstanding Achievement in Video Tape Editing for a Series	Roy Stewart (for The War Widow)	Won	
Primetime Emmy Awards	1978	Outstanding Achievement in Lighting Direction	Ken Dettling, Leard Davis (for You Can Run But You Can't Hide)	Nominated	

== Sources ==
- Cook, Bruce (October 1976). "The Writer Unblocked". American Film. II (1). Washington, D.C.: American Film Institute: 26–30 – via the Internet Archive. (registration required)
- Jones, Paul (April 25, 1977). "Peabody Awards Cite Winners". The Atlanta Constitution. Vol. 109, no. 234. p. 9-B – via Newspapers.com. (subscription required)
- Krafft, Rebecca, ed. (Fall 1991). "Visions". The Arts on Television, 1976–1990: Fifteen Years of Cultural Programming. Washington, D.C.: Media Arts: Film/Radio Television Program, National Endowment for the Arts. pp. 100–104. ISBN 978-0-16-035926-2 – via Google Books. This article incorporates text from this source, which is in the public domain.
- Margulies, Lee (August 4, 1977). "'Roots' Tops Nominations at Emmy Rerun". View – Part IV. Los Angeles Times. Vol. XCVI, no. 244. Los Angeles. pp. 1, 15–16 – via Newspapers.com. (subscription required)
- Brown, James (September 11, 1977). "'Eleanor and Franklin' Wins Television Honors". Part I. Los Angeles Times. Vol. XCVI, no. 282. Los Angeles. pp. 3, 26 – via Newspapers.com. (subscription required)
- Smith, Cecil (August 11, 1978a). "NBC Leads in Emmy Nominations". View – Part IV. Los Angeles Times. Vol. XCVII, no. 251. Los Angeles. pp. 1, 29–30, 32 – via Newspapers.com. (subscription required)
- ——— (October 9, 1978b). "A Living Black Cowboy in 'Visions'". View – Part IV. Los Angeles Times. Vol. XCVII, no. 310. Los Angeles. pp. 1, 16 – via Newspapers.com. (subscription required)
