= The War Widow =

1976 television film by Paul Bogart

- Genre: Historical drama
- Written by: Harvey Perr
- Directed by: Paul Bogart
- Starring: Pamela Bellwood; Frances Lee McCain; Tim Matheson; Maxine Stuart; Nan Martin
- Music by: Mark Snow
- Composer: Joseph Raposo
- Country of origin: United States
- Original language: English

Production
- Producer: Barbra Schultz
- Cinematography: Barry Brown; Wayne Orr; Jack Reader
- Editor: Roy Stewart
- Running time: 78 minutes
- Production company: KCET

Original release
- Network: PBS
- Release: October 28, 1976

The War Widow is a 1976 historical drama television film directed by Paul Bogart. It was produced by Barbara Schultz and written by Harvey Perr. The movie stars Pamela Bellwood, Frances Lee McCain, Tim Matheson, Maxine Stuart, and Nan Martin. It was described by the Chicago Reader as "the first positive treatment of a lesbian theme on American TV."

It was originally broadcast by KCET, Los Angeles, a PBS affiliate, on their dramatic showcase series, Visions, which showcased new writers. It was the second in the Visions series.

== Synopsis ==
The film is set during World War I. Amy is living with her mother and young daughter in a country manor outside New York City. Her husband is off fighting in the war. Amy has no friends to speak of and her life is without direction, so she jumps at the chance to do an errand for her mother in the city.

It is there that she meets Jenny in a ladies tea room. Jenny works for a living as a photographer. She introduces Amy to a new world and opens her eyes to the art of photography to pioneers in the field like; Alfred Stieglitz, Edward Steichen and Paul Strand.

Amy ends up taking Jenny to her home for a visit with her mother, and eventually becomes Jenny's assistant, helping her photograph women confined to an insane asylum. As Amy continues to go to New York more and more often to help Jenny, she becomes less interested in her husband's letters, who is away fighting in the war.

When Amy and Jenny spend a week at the family's beach house, Amy finally acknowledges Jenny's love. The film ends with Amy saying goodbye, and explaining to her daughter that she is going away for a very long time. When she arrives in New York and meets up with Jenny, she says: "Nothing is easy, is it", to which Jenny replies: "No, nothing I know."

== Cast ==
- Katharine Bard as Sarah
- Pamela Bellwood as Amy
- Barbara Cason as Kate
- Frances Lee McCain as Jenny
- Nan Martin as Annie
- Tim Matheson as Leonard
- Stephanie Retsek as Beth
- Maxine Stuart as Emily

== Background ==
Harvey Perr, who wrote the play, was put in touch with Visions through his agent, who had heard about the project. After meeting with Barbara Schultz, they talked over ideas about what they envisioned for the project. Perr recalls that he thought of the play as a "human drama", and decided it should be a period piece, so he conducted research in the World War I era, and "somehow whatever theme it has just took over." He went on to say that no one ever came to him and said; "write a feminist play." He states he presented it to them and they said "go ahead."

== Release ==
The film was produced for Los Angeles PBS affiliate KCET's Visions series. It was broadcast nationally in October 1976, with a disclaimer that it was funded by grant money rather than public funds. For the time period it was released, it was described by the Chicago Reader, as "the first, positive treatment of a lesbian theme on American TV," while the UCLA Film & Television Archive said it was a "significant milestone in the realistic, positive depiction of lesbians on primetime television."

== Critical analysis and reception ==
=== Analysis ===
Austrian-American sex researcher Fritz Klein wrote, "we have the rich, full portrayal of two homosexual people; what is excluded is Amy's bisexuality; it is there, but it is vague, it is not dealt with, it is ignored; Amy would seem to be a lesbian, her marriage a sham; as a lesbian she is understood and viewed with sympathy; as a bisexual her existence is fuzzy."

Film historian Vito Russo wrote that in 1976, there were "two stunning television dramas, The Naked Civil Servant and The War Widow, which were positive evocations of the lives of gay characters, real and fictional; both shows infused their central characters with a sense of history and of their role in that history as strugglers for sexual freedom; both shows uncovered with romance and humor a hidden part of the gay experience." Russo argues that when Amy decides to leave her husband and her young daughter to choose a lifestyle that was "violently condemned at that time, was shown to be cataclysmic; thus her courage is striking yet understandable." He further opined that the ending of the film "encapsulates those women who left small towns all over the world for the anonymity and safety of larger cities where they could be with their own kind and begin to be the people they truly were."

=== Reception ===
Author Shayna Warner opined that "Harvey Perr and Paul Bogart created a sumptuously designed, carefully staged period piece of quiet despair being met by determination, in which upper-class, depressed, and harried mother Amy is brought back to her senses by bold portraitist Jenny." Terrence O'Flaherty of the San Francisco Chronicle wrote "it is an absolutely first-rate adult love story sensitively portrayed and beautifully produced; there is nothing vague about the nature of the love but it is handled with dignity and taste and the ending is honest."

Film critic John J. O'Connor wrote that the movie "encompasses a sympathetic treatment of a lesbian relationship but, more important, the characters are portrayed as intelligent people, not as ludicrous stereotypes." He goes on to say the film succeeds, "perhaps through its emotional validity more than anything else." He also offered praise for the actors, sayin the "performances are incredibly good; Pamela Bellwood's Amy is strikingly lovely and affecting; Francis Lee McCain is a revelation as Jennie, presenting the woman with a direct and appealing openness and Katharine Bard is perfectly distant and curiously sympathetic as Amy's mother."

Television critic Cecil Smith stated the film "is as perfect a television play as I can remember — very intimate and delicate and personal, the kind of play Paddy Chayevsky called 'the drama of the moment'; it's a mood piece, exquisitely fashioned under the sensitive direction of Paul Bogart; there is something very fragile and ethereal about it, like Japanese silk-screen paintings; their love affair is handled neither meanly nor shamefacedly but as a joyful encounter."

Michael Connor from The Wall Street Journal observed that "Harvey Perr's film is probably the most beautiful and sensitive treatment of love between two women that has ever been produced for TV." Critic Kay Gardella commented that "dealing with a subject like lesbianism is not easy; many resent the theme, but as Barbara Schultz so wisely points out, a successful drama engages your emotionally, you don't have to approve of the subject or even like it; but if it is effective and it works, it engages you and you can understand it on an emotional level."

== Accolades ==
The movie won the Audience Award for Best Video at the 1988 San Francisco International Lesbian and Gay Film Festival.

== See also ==
- List of LGBTQ-related films of 1976
- List of made-for-television films with LGBTQ characters

== Sources ==
- Chicago Reader (October 26, 1985). "The War Widow". Chicago Reader. Archived from the original on September 28, 2025.
- Connor, Michael; Gardella, Kay (December 9, 1976). "The War Widow". Los Angeles Times.
- Cook, Bruce (October 1976). "The Writer Unblocked". American Film. 2 (1).
- Klein, Fritz (2014) [1994]. The Bisexual Option: Second Edition. Foreword by Regina U. Reinhardt. Routledge. doi:10.4324/9781315784007. ISBN 978-1-317-71320-3.
- O'Connor, John J. (October 28, 1976). "TV: Fine Drama About Lesbians: The War Widow, by Harvey Perr, Will Be on Public Television's Visions Series Tonight". The New York Times.
- O'Flaherty, Terrence (October 29, 1976). "TV Today: Not a Usual Love". San Francisco Chronicle.
- Perr, Harvey (October 28, 1976). The War Widow (Video). Visions. KCET. Event occurs at 1:15:17.
- Russo, Vito (1981). "Fear and Loathing in Gay Hollywood". The Celluloid Closet (1st. ed.). New York: Harper & Row. ISBN 0-06-013704-5.
- Sloan, Jane (2007). "Filmography: Feature Films on the Subject of Women since 1960". Reel Women: An International Directory of Contemporary Feature Films about Women. Scarecrow Press. ISBN 978-1-4616-7082-7.
- Smith, Cecil (October 28, 1976). "War Widow a Dark Gem". Los Angeles Times.
- Warner, Shayna Maci (2024). The Rainbow Age of Television: An Opinionated History of Queer TV. Abrams Books. ISBN 978-1-64700-715-7.
- UCLA Newsroom (July 29, 2021). "UCLA Film & Television Archive presents landmark LGBTQ TV drama 'The War Widow'". UCLA Film & Television Archive. Archived from the original on March 26, 2025.
