= Shenandoah (film) =

1965 American Civil War film directed by Andrew V. McLaglen

- 1965 cinema poster
- Directed by: Andrew V. McLaglen
- Screenplay by: James Lee Barrett
- Based on: Fields of Honor by James Lee Barrett
- Produced by: Robert Arthur
- Starring: James Stewart; Doug McClure; Glenn Corbett; Patrick Wayne; Katharine Ross; Rosemary Forsyth; Phillip Alford; Paul Fix; James Best
- Cinematography: William H. Clothier, A.S.C.
- Edited by: Otho Lovering
- Music by: Frank Skinner
- Color process: Technicolor
- Production company: Universal Pictures
- Distributed by: Universal Pictures
- Release date: June 3, 1965
- Running time: 105 minutes
- Country: United States
- Language: English
- Box office: $17,268,889

Shenandoah is a 1965 American film set during the American Civil War starring James Stewart and featuring Doug McClure, Glenn Corbett, Patrick Wayne, and, in their film debuts, Katharine Ross and Rosemary Forsyth. The picture was directed by Andrew V. McLaglen. The American folk song "Oh Shenandoah" features prominently in the film's soundtrack.

Though set during the Civil War, the film's strong antiwar and humanitarian themes resonated with audiences in later years as attitudes began to change against the Vietnam War. Upon its release, the film was praised for its themes as well as its technical production.

== Plot ==
In the Commonwealth of Virginia in 1864, during the Civil War, family patriarch Charlie Anderson and his six sons Jacob, John, James, Nathan, Henry, and Boy (who is 16) run the family farm, while his daughter Jennie and daughter-in-law Ann (the wife of James) take care of the housework. The family has no slaves. Though Charlie attends church weekly and considers himself a "God fearing" man, he doesn't give God credit for anything, but takes credit for himself especially during dinner prayer. He internally blames God for taking his wife from him. His family is regularly late for church and will force people out of their seats to make room for his family, to the annoyance of the preacher and congregation.

Charlie is an archetype of a rugged individualist. Although the Civil War has been raging around him for some three years, literally being fought within miles of his farm, he does not concern himself with the issues or with loyalty but only with his own and his family's welfare. Charlie's oldest son Jacob wants to join the Confederate Army to defend Virginia, but Charlie repeatedly tells his family that they won't become involved in the war until it concerns them directly. Although a few of the boys want to join up, they respect their father's wishes and remain on the farm. Jennie is courted by a young Confederate officer named Sam. He wants to marry Jennie, and when Charlie gives his permission, the wedding occurs a few days later. As soon as the vows are said, a corporal who has been waiting in the rear of the church comes forward to announce that Sam is wanted back immediately. Sam leaves, much to the sorrow of his new bride. Shortly after Sam leaves, Ann goes into labor and gives birth to a baby girl, whom she and James name Martha in honor of Charlie's late wife.

While out hunting raccoon, Boy and his friend Gabriel stumble onto a Confederate ambush. They run away and stop for a drink at a pond. Boy is wearing an old rebel soldier kepi cap that he found at the river. When a Union patrol comes on them, they take Boy as a prisoner of war, mistakenly thinking, based on the cap, that he is a rebel soldier. Gabriel, who has been told he is free by a black Union soldier, runs to tell the Andersons what happened and then, assured by Jennie that it is true that slaves in the Confederacy have been declared emancipated, heads out on his own. When Charlie hears the news of Boy's capture, he, along with Jacob, John, Nathan, Henry and Jennie leave to look for him, leaving James and Ann at the farm with their young baby.

The first place the Andersons look is a nearby Union camp. They are told there are no prisoners there, but Colonel Fairchild, who also has a sixteen-year-old son, directs them to a possible location, where Confederate prisoners are shipped North via railroad. However, the captain in charge at the train depot refuses to allow Charlie to look through the cars, as he "has schedules to keep". So Charlie sets up a roadblock on the tracks, then disarms the Union guards and sends them away. He looks through the boxcars, but Boy is not there, so he mounts his horse to leave. As he looks up, he sees Sam coming through the crowd of liberated prisoners. Jennie is overjoyed to see her husband. Sam leaves with the Andersons, telling the soldiers to burn the train and go home, knowing that the South has no chance of winning the war.

After being taken to a different prisoner of war camp, Boy is befriended by rebel soldier Carter, who plans to escape and decides to let Boy come along. They and a few other men successfully escape while being loaded on a paddle wheeler and start heading south. They come onto a Confederate camp and the next day are attacked by the Federals. Carter is killed in battle, and Boy is shot in the leg. A Union soldier almost kills him, but it turns out to be Gabriel, who has joined the Union Army. Gabriel helps Boy hide in a bush until after the battle.

Back at the farm, three Confederate scavengers raid the place, killing James before attacking and killing Ann. On their way home, the Andersons run across a Confederate unit guarding the road. A young sentry, startled awake by the sound of horses, takes a shot at Jacob, killing him instantly. Charlie starts to strangle the sentry, but stops to ask him his age. The sentry replies, "Sixteen, sir." Charlie, remembering Boy, emotionally tells the sentry that he wants him to live and be an old man and have many sons. He wants him to know what it feels like to lose one of them. The sentry then weeps.

When the Andersons return home, the doctor tells them what happened to James and Ann. Baby Martha is still alive, with a black woman acting as her nanny, and Charlie takes her in his arms. The next day at the breakfast table, Charlie begins his standard prayer, but is so heartbroken that he can't finish it. He goes out to the family graveyard to see his wife's grave. He sees the graves of James, Jacob, and Ann alongside hers, and he hears church bells ringing in the distance.

At the farmhouse, he demands to know why nobody told him that it was Sunday. The whole family gets dressed and ready for church, arriving late, as usual, as the singing begins. As the congregation completes the first hymn, the pastor starts to announce the next. Boy stumbles through the door on a crutch. The whole congregation looks, and Charlie turns to see what is happening. His face lights up, and he helps his son to the pew. Everybody joyously sings in unison.

== Cast ==
- James Stewart as Charlie Anderson
- Doug McClure as Sam
- Glenn Corbett as Jacob Anderson
- Patrick Wayne as James Anderson
- Phillip Alford as Boy Anderson
- Katharine Ross as Ann Anderson
- Rosemary Forsyth as Jennie Anderson
- Charles Robinson as Nathan Anderson
- James McMullan as John Anderson
- Tim McIntire as Henry Anderson
- Gene Jackson as Gabriel
- Paul Fix as Dr. Tom Witherspoon
- Denver Pyle as Pastor Bjoerling
- George Kennedy as Col. Fairchild
- James Best as Carter (rebel soldier)
- Tom Simcox as Lt. Johnson
- Berkeley Harris as Capt. Richards
- Harry Carey Jr. as Jenkins (rebel soldier)
- Kevin Hagen as Mule (deserter)
- Rayford Barnes (deserter)
- Dabbs Greer as Abernathy
- Strother Martin as Train Engineer
- Kelly Thordsen as Federal Purchasing Agent Carroll
- Lane Bradford as Federal Purchasing Agent Tatum
- Bob Steele (actor) as Train Guard

== Production ==
Location scenes were filmed near Eugene, Oregon. Working titles included: Fields of Honor and Shenandoah Crossing. The film broke box office records in Virginia, the story's locale.

== Reception ==
The film was particularly successful at the box office within the state of Virginia, the movie's locale, where it broke records for ticket sales. On the review aggregator website Rotten Tomatoes, 100% of 6 critics' reviews are positive.

Howard Thompson of The New York Times called the film "a pretty good Civil War drama" with Stewart "perfectly cast," though he thought it was "too long. Under the overly detailed direction of Andrew V. McLaglen, it hits and hangs onto many a static snag." Philip K. Scheuer of the Los Angeles Times called it "a curious film for this day and age, a kind of anachronistic throwback to the bucolic... Nevertheless, it serves as a reminder of homely virtues and homilies, as spoken, mostly, by James Stewart. He creates a unique character and sustains it convincingly through stress and tragic change." Leo Sullivan of The Washington Post praised it as "an engrossing film with lots of heart and even a soul," adding, "Playing with splendid conviction, Stewart forgoes his usual tricks to gain sympathy for this widower who has raised six sons and an equally sturdy daughter. His performance is a thoughtful study in one man's attempt at neutrality."

Variety stated that "the Technicolor film, despite a neuter title, packs drama, excitement and an emotional quality certain National Parks particularly reflected in the climax — which should find better-than-average reception in the general market ... Stewart, seldom without a cigar butt in the corner of his mouth, endows his grizzled role with a warm conviction." The Monthly Film Bulletin wrote, "Basically sentimental, the film even includes a scene where the longstanding but still sorrowing widower philosophizes about life over his wife's grave, but the treatment often has a freshness and humour which show that McLaglen has learned from his admiration for John Ford ... James Stewart, whose laconic drawl makes the dialogue sound funnier than it really is, gives one of the best performances of his career."

== Awards ==
In 1966, the film was nominated for an Academy Award for Best Sound (Waldon O. Watson). For her part in Shenandoah, Rosemary Forsyth was nominated for a Golden Globe for Most Promising Newcomer - Female.

== Adaptations ==
The film was adapted as a hit Broadway musical in 1975, which won John Cullum his first Tony Award for Best Actor.
