= Saturday Adoption =

- CBS Playhouse episode
- Episode no.: Season 2 Episode 2
- Directed by: Delbert Mann
- Written by: Ron Cowen
- Original air date: December 4, 1968

Episode chronology
← Previous "The People Next Door"	Next → "The Experiment"

"Saturday Adoption" is the second television play episode of the second season of the American television series CBS Playhouse. The episode tells the story of a young white man about to enter law school who meets a young black man, Macy, when he volunteers to tutor urban youths. The episode discusses the issues surrounding the differences between the black and white worlds of the time.

The episode was broadcast December 4, 1968, and is noteworthy as the CBS Playhouse entry with the youngest writer, Ron Cowen, at 23 years of age.
