= The Experiment (CBS Playhouse) =

- CBS Playhouse episode
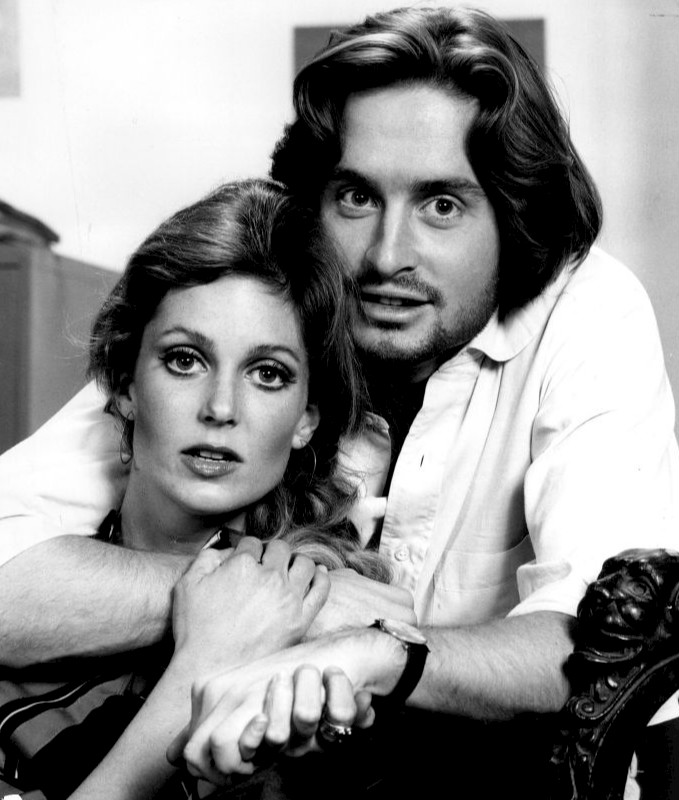
- Michael Douglas and Tisha Sterling in "The Experiment"
- Episode no.: Season 2 Episode 3
- Directed by: Robert Butler
- Written by: Ellen M. Violett
- Original air date: February 25, 1969

Episode chronology
← Previous "Saturday Adoption"	Next → "Shadow Game"

"The Experiment" is a television play that was the third episode of the second season of the American television series CBS Playhouse. Broadcast February 25, 1969, it starred Michael Douglas (credited as "M. K. Douglas") as a young scientist who puts aside his liberal principles to work for a cutting-edge chemical company.

"The Experiment" was Michael Douglas's first television role is the only CBS Playhouse installment written by a woman, Ellen M. Violett, which earned her an Emmy award nomination.
