= Earl Hamner Jr. =

American actor, writer (1923–2016)

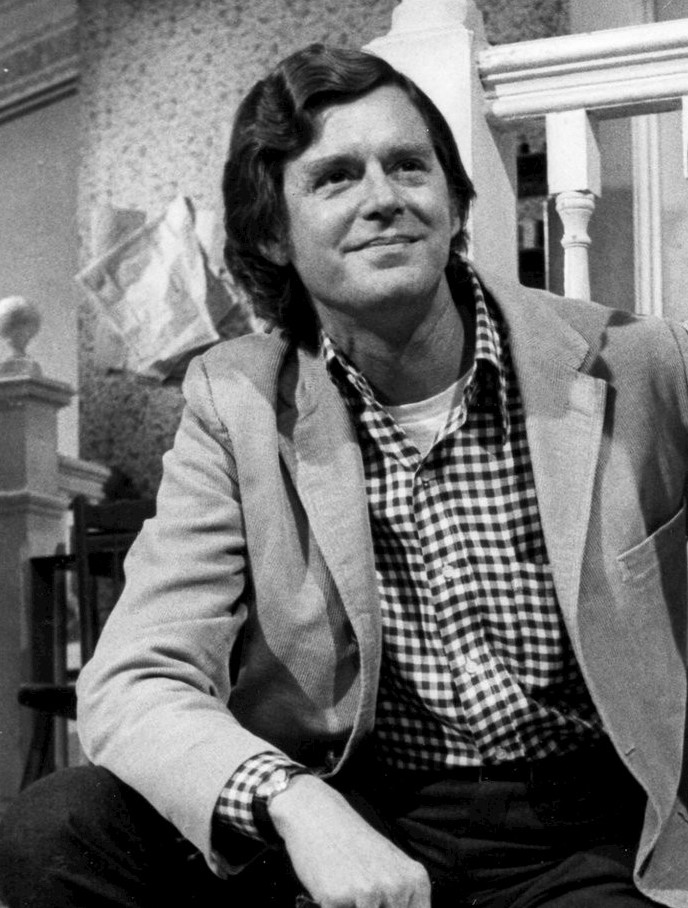
- Hamner on the set of The Waltons in 1976
- Born: Earl Henry Hamner Jr. July 10, 1923; Schuyler, Virginia, U.S.
- Died: March 24, 2016 (aged 92); Los Angeles, California, U.S.
- Occupations: Writer, producer
- Spouse: Jane Martin (m. 1954)
- Children: 2, including Scott Hamner
- Relatives: Nora Spencer Hamner (aunt)

Earl Henry Hamner Jr. (July 10, 1923 – March 24, 2016) was an American television writer and producer (sometimes credited as Earl Hamner), best known for his work in the 1970s and 1980s as the creator of two long-running series, The Waltons and Falcon Crest. As a novelist, he is best known for Spencer's Mountain, which was inspired by his own childhood and formed the basis for both the film of the same name and the television series The Waltons, for which he provided voice-over narration at the beginning of most episodes to set the scene and provide context and occasionally at the end of the program.

== Early life ==
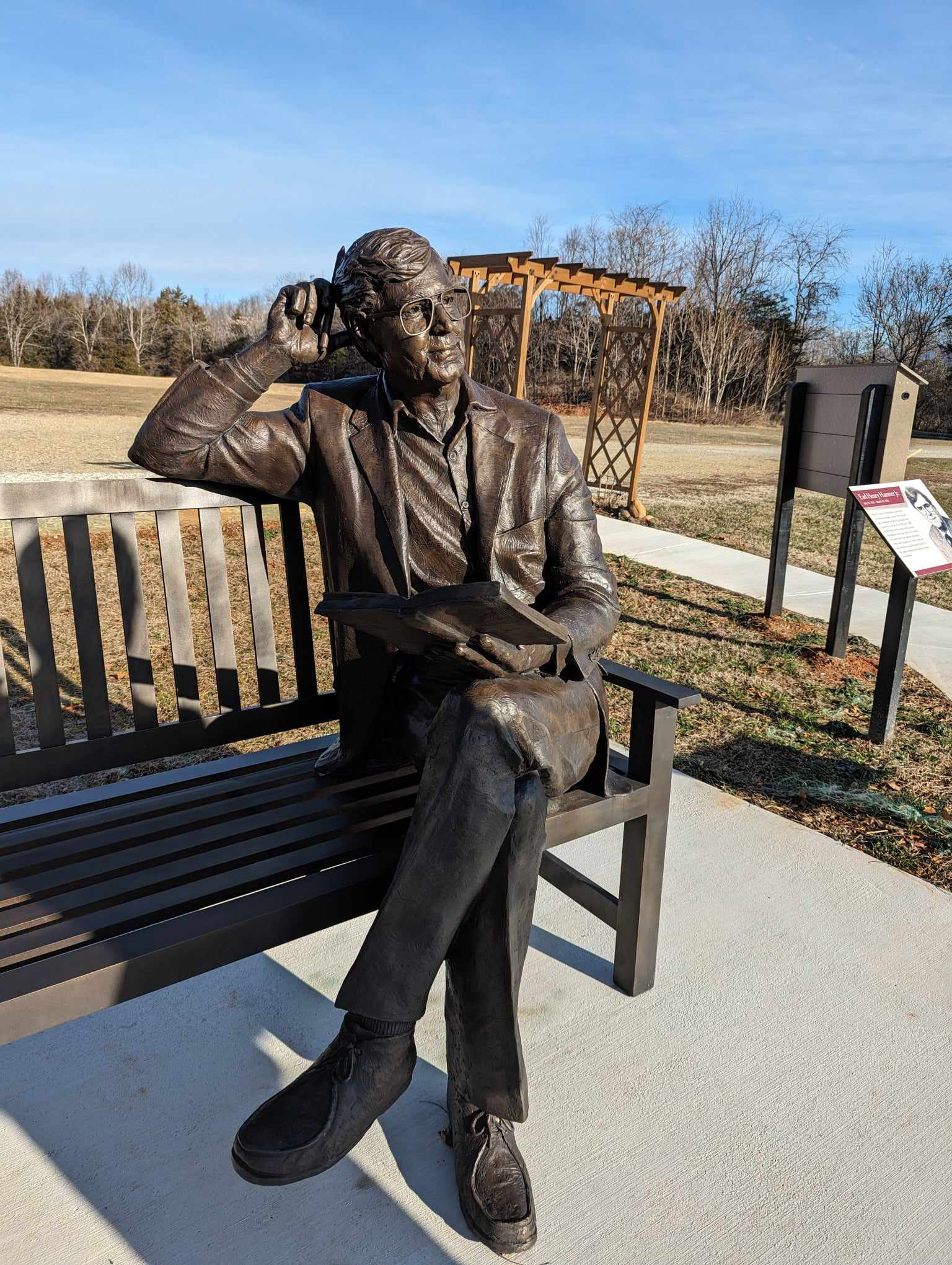
Statue of Hamner near his birthplace in Nelson County, Virginia

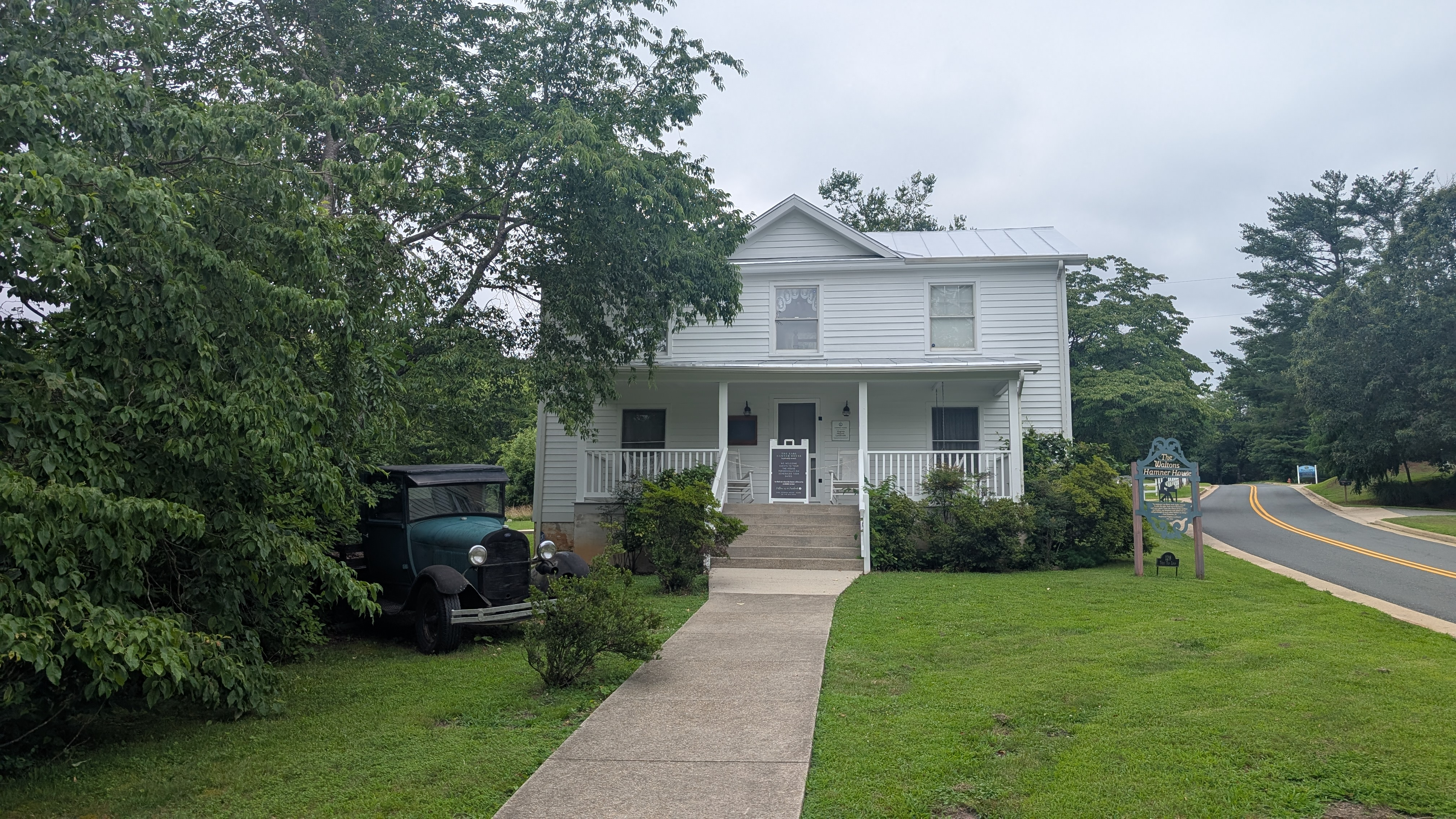
The childhood home of Hamner

Hamner was born July 10, 1923, in Schuyler, Virginia, (Nelson County) to Doris Marion (née Giannini) and Earl Henry Hamner Sr. The oldest of eight children, Hamner had four brothers and three sisters. The other boys, from youngest to next-oldest, were James Edmund, Willard Harold, Paul Louis, and Clifton Anderson. The girls, from youngest to oldest, were Nancy Alice, Audrey Jane, and Marion Lee.

The family of Hamner's mother, the Gianninis, were immigrants who came to the United States from Lucca, Italy, in the 1700s. His father's family came to Virginia from Wales. Until the early 1900s, the Hamners were tobacco farmers near the James River, when they moved further northwest to Schuyler, located in Nelson County adjacent to the Shenandoah Valley in the Appalachian Mountains/Allegheny Mountains chain on the eastern slopes of the Blue Ridge Mountains.

Schuyler was a company town where the economy was based in soapstone mining by New Alberene Stone, and the town was hit hard by the economic hardships in the Great Depression of the 1930s when the company and its mines closed. Hamner's father worked in the mines from the time his eldest son was born until the company's closing. After losing his job, Earl Sr. found work as a machinist at the DuPont de Nemours Company chemical plant in Waynesboro, Virginia, about 30 miles west. Due to the distance between home and work, Earl Sr. lived at a boarding house in Waynesboro during the weekdays and traveled back to Schuyler and his family on the weekends. Taking a bus from Waynesboro to Charlottesville and another stop along the way, Hamner's father would walk then the six miles further to the family's rural home to complete his weekly journey. His walk on a snowy Christmas Eve in 1933 was the inspiration for Hamner's 1970 novel, The Homecoming, which became a Christmas holiday made-for-TV special, aired on the Columbia Broadcasting System (CBS) in mid-December 1971. Starring Andrew Duggan and Patricia Neal, it was the inspiration for The Waltons TV series, which broadcast its first episode nine months later in September 1972.

During Earl's childhood years, the family (all except Earl Sr.) attended a small white wood-frame clapboard church known as Schuyler Baptist Church. In April 2014, the church honored Earl with a special worship service in connection with the filming and release of a film documentary titled Earl Hamner, Storyteller.

Hamner was in his sophomore year on a scholarship at the University of Richmond when he was drafted into the United States Army during World War II (1939/1941-1945). He was first trained to defuse landmines and then transferred to the Quartermaster Corps because he could type. He served in France after the famous D-day invasion of Normandy in June 1944. Following the war, he attended Northwestern University in Evanston, Illinois (near Chicago), and then graduated from the University of Cincinnati with a degree in broadcast communications.

== Career ==
On January 15, 1953, his short teleplay "The Hound of Heaven" was televised on The Kate Smith Hour, which aired 1950 to 1954 on the NBC television network. The teleplay featured actors James Dean and John Carradine.

In 1954, Hamner wrote "Hit and Run", an episode of the early legal drama Justice. He reprised the theme a decade later in the 1964 "You Drive" episode of The Twilight Zone.

In the early 1960s, Hamner contributed eight more episodes to the highly regarded science fiction series The Twilight Zone. His first script acceptance for the series was his big writing break in Hollywood. He also wrote or co-wrote eight episodes of the CBS TV series Gentle Ben (1967–1969) and four episodes of the sitcom Nanny and the Professor (1970–1971) for the ABC TV network.

He also created two other short-lived television series: Apple's Way (1974–1975) starring Ronny Cox on CBS, and Boone (1983–1984) starring Tom Byrd on NBC.

Hamner often used distant family names to title his projects: Spencer (Spencer's Mountain) is the maiden name of his paternal grandmother Susan Henry Spencer Hamner. The Waltons' name derives from his paternal grandfather Walter Clifton Hamner and great-grandfather Walter Leland Hamner.

== Death ==
Hamner died in Los Angeles, California, of bladder cancer on March 24, 2016, aged 92. On July 8, 2023, a bronze statue of Hamner was unveiled in Nelson County, Virginia, two days prior to his centennial birthday.

== List of works ==
Novels

- Fifty Roads to Town (1953)
- Spencer's Mountain (1961)
- You Can't Get There from Here (1965)
- The Homecoming: A Novel About Spencer's Mountain (1970)
- Lassie: A Christmas Story (1997; co-written with Don Sipes, children's picture book story with illustrations by Kevin Burke)
- Murder in Tinseltown (2000; co-written with Don Sipes)

Non-fiction

- The Avocado Drive Zoo (a memoir) (1999)
- Good Night, John Boy (2002; reminiscences of making The Waltons TV series)
- Generous Women (2006; collection of memoirs)

Screenplays

- Palm Springs Weekend (1963)
- Charlotte's Web (1973)

Teleplays

- Highway (1954)
- Episodes of The Twilight Zone:
  - "The Hunt" (1962)
  - "A Piano in the House" (1962)
  - "Jess-Belle" (1963)
  - "Ring-a-Ding Girl" (1963)
  - "You Drive" (1964)
  - "Black Leather Jackets" (1964)
  - "Stopover in a Quiet Town" (1964)
  - "The Bewitchin' Pool" (1964)
- Heidi (1968)
- Appalachian Autumn (1969)
- Aesop's Fables (1971)
- The Homecoming: A Christmas Story (December 1971 pilot film; for the Columbia Broadcasting System (CBS) television network, for future The Waltons subsequent TV series the following year)
- Where the Lilies Bloom (1974)
- The Gift of Love: A Christmas Story (1983)

== Awards and recognition ==
- Peabody Awards
  - 1972 Winner,: George Foster Peabody Award for Distinguished Journalism (1972) for The Waltons. (recognizing "CBS-TV, Earl Hamner Jr., and all others who have had a part.")
- Primetime Emmy:
  - 1972 Nominee, Outstanding Writing Achievement in Drama - Adaptation: The Homecoming: A Christmas Story.
  - 1973 Nominee, Outstanding Writing Achievement in Drama, for The Waltons episode: "The Love Story".
- Writers Guild of America, USA
  - 1974 Nominee, WGA Award (TV): Episodic Drama: The Waltons episode: "An Easter Story" (1973). (Shared with: John McGreevey)
  - 1974 Nominee, WGA Award (TV): Episodic Drama: The Waltons episode: "The Thanksgiving Story" (1973). (Shared with: Joanna Lee)
- Library of Virginia Literary Awards Celebration
  - Honoree: Literary Lifetime Achievement Award (2011) (Presented to Hamner by actor Richard Thomas, the lead actor in The Waltons series, who portrayed the character that Hamner based on himself).

Hamner received other awards, including:

- TV-Radio Writers Award (1967)
- Virginian of the Year Award from Virginia Press Association (1973)
- National Association of Television Executives Man of the Year Award (1974)
- Virginia Association of Broadcasters Award (1975)
- Frederic Ziv Award from the University of Cincinnati for Outstanding Achievement in Telecommunication

Hamner's works (particularly The Waltons and related films and television productions) also received extensive recognition, including an Emmy for Best Drama Series for The Waltons (1974), 15 Golden Globes nominations, and other awards.

The Earl Hamner Jr. Theater (or simply: The Hamner Theater) – A community performing arts theater in Nelson County, Virginia (where Hamner grew up) – is named for him.
