= Kay Gardella =

American journalist

- Born: Genevieve C. Gardella; February 23, 1923; Belleville, New Jersey, U.S.
- Died: April 13, 2005 (aged 82); New York City, New York, U.S.
- Education: Upsala College
- Occupation: Journalist
- Organization: New York Daily News
- Spouse: Anthony Marino

Genevieve C. "Kay" Gardella (February 23, 1923 – April 13, 2005) was an American journalist who worked for the New York Daily News for nearly 60 years.

== Early life and education ==
Born in Belleville, New Jersey, Gardella joined the Daily News as a copygirl two years after graduating from the now-defunct Upsala College in East Orange, New Jersey.

== Career ==
Over the remainder of the century, Gardella worked her way through the ranks of the New York Daily News. During her career, she interviewed Frank Sinatra, Edward R. Murrow, and others.

She was particularly close friends with Bob Hope and his wife, Dolores. The paper named her radio and television editor in 1975, a critic in 1981, and finally a columnist in 1993. Gardella often mourned for the "golden age of Hollywood" and criticized declining values. Gardella was a guest on Rowan & Martin's Laugh-In in 1972 and appeared as a panelist in four episodes of The New Hollywood Squares.

She was very critical of Howard Stern in the 1980s.

Gardella suffered from cancer in her final years. Her last column appeared on March 19, 2005.

== Personal life ==
On April 13, 2005, she died at Cabrini Medical Center in New York City. She was married to the late Daily News reporter Anthony Marino.
