= George Bellak =

American television writer

George Bellak (April 9, 1919 – October 22, 2002) was an American television writer who was active from the 1950s to the 1980s. He wrote episodes for Justice, (1954), Playhouse 90 (1957–1959), The Asphalt Jungle (1961), N.Y.P.D. (1967–1968), Cannon (1970–1975), and dozens of others. He was a winner of Writers Guild of America Award, and was nominated for an Emmy award for his teleplay "Sadbird" as part of the CBS Playhouse series.

Bellak was recruited in August 1973 to work on the TV series Space: 1999 (1975). He wrote the pilot episode "Breakaway" and was story consultant during early development, even preparing a writer's guide in September, before leaving the show in October just before filming began.
