= The Day Before Sunday =

- CBS Playhouse episode
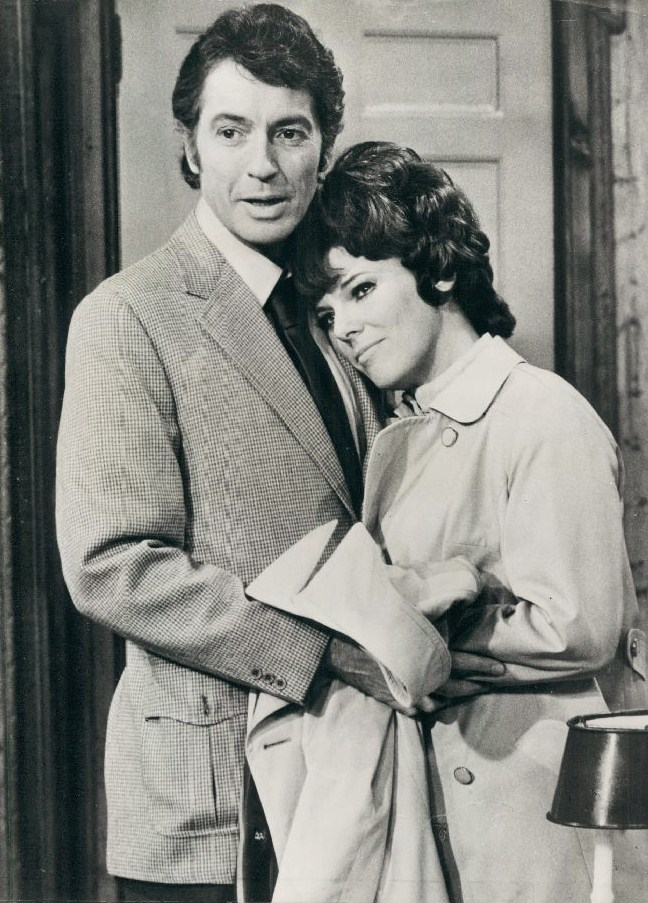
- Farley Granger and Jacqueline Scott in "The Day Before Sunday"
- Episode no.: Season 3 Episode 3
- Directed by: Paul Bogart
- Written by: Robert J. Crean
- Original air date: February 10, 1970

Episode chronology
← Previous "Sadbird"	Next → —

"The Day Before Sunday" is the third television play episode of the third season of the American television series CBS Playhouse. The episode told the story of an unmarried middle-aged woman who meets a divorced man on her plane as she flies to attend her niece's graduation.

"The Day Before Sunday", broadcast February 10, 1970, was the final CBS Playhouse episode to air.
