= Sadbird =

- CBS Playhouse episode
- Episode no.: Season 3 Episode 2
- Directed by: Paul Bogart; William A. Graham
- Written by: George Bellak
- Original air date: December 1, 1969

Episode chronology
← Previous "Appalachian Autumn"	Next → "The Day Before Sunday"

"Sadbird" is the second television play episode of the third season of the American television series CBS Playhouse. The episode was a coming-of-age drama about a young man finding his own in the toy business after years of rejecting the corporate lifestyle.

"Sadbird" aired December 1, 1969, was nominated for an Emmy award for writer George Bellak, and starred such noteworthy actors and actresses as Ed Asner, Tyne Daly, and Jack Albertson.
