= William Graham (director) =

American television and film director (1926–2013)

- Born: William A. Graham; May 15, 1926; New York City, New York, U.S.
- Died: September 12, 2013 (aged 87); Malibu, California, U.S.
- Other names: Bill Graham; Billy Graham
- Education: Yale University; Neighborhood Playhouse School of the Theatre
- Occupations: Television director Film director
- Years active: 1958–2002

William A. Graham (May 15, 1926 – September 12, 2013) was an American television and film director. He died in California at age 87 from pneumonia in mid September 2013.

== Career ==
Beginning in 1958, Graham worked as a prolific television director, including episodes for Kraft Television Theatre, Omnibus, Checkmate, Naked City, Breaking Point, 12 O'Clock High, The F.B.I., The Fugitive, Batman, CBS Playhouse, and The X-Files. In 1980, he was nominated for a Primetime Emmy Award for directing the television film Guyana Tragedy: The Story of Jim Jones.

In addition to his television work, Graham directed films, such as Honky (1971), Where the Lilies Bloom (1974), and Return to the Blue Lagoon (1991). He is known for directing American singer and actor Elvis Presley's final film Change of Habit (1969).
