= CBS Playhouse =

1967–1970 American TV series

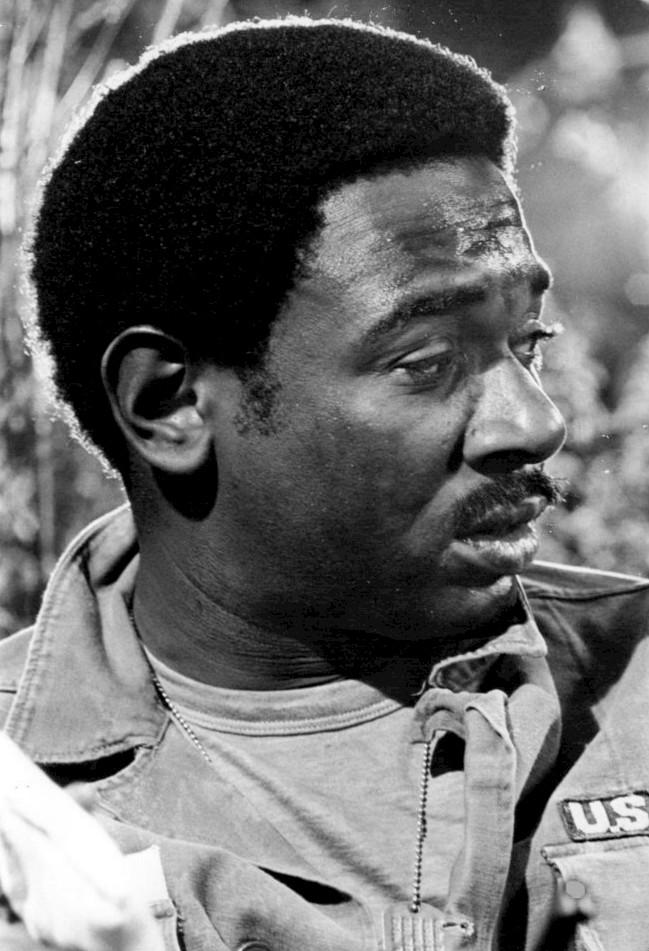
- Ivan Dixon in the series debut, "The Final War of Olly Winter" (January 29, 1967)
- Genre: Anthology drama
- Written by: Ron Cowen; Robert J. Crean; Earl Hamner; Loring Mandel; JP Miller; Tad Mosel; Ronald Ribman; Reginald Rose; Ellen M. Violet
- Directed by: Paul Bogart; Richard Butler; William A. Graham; David Greene; Delbert Mann; George Schaefer
- Theme music composer: Aaron Copland
- Country of origin: United States
- Original language: English
- No. of seasons: 3
- No. of episodes: 12

Production
- Executive producer: Barbara Schultz
- Camera setup: Single-camera
- Running time: 90 minutes

Original release
- Network: CBS
- Release: January 29, 1967 – February 10, 1970

CBS Playhouse is an American anthology drama television series that aired on CBS from 1967 to 1970. Airing 12 plays over the course of its run, the series won ten Primetime Emmy Awards and featured many noteworthy actors and playwrights.

== History ==
The CBS Playhouse series was announced in 1966, with CBS announcing a $500,000 outlay for new scripts to film. CBS was specifically looking to "encourage authors to write original and significant dramas for television", and offered $25,000 per optioned script. This occurred shortly after ABC announced its dramatic arts program ABC Stage 67, along with many CBS dramas.

Playhouse ultimately commissioned 13 playwrights to write scripts for the series. The first program aired in 1967, titled "The Final War of Olly Winter", starring Ivan Dixon and written by noted playwright Ronald Ribman. According to CBS, over 30 million people watched the broadcast, making it a popular hit for the time.

Twelve broadcasts ultimately occurred before production stopped due to lack of sponsorship funding. CBS would later revive the genre in CBS Playhouse 90, which would refer back to both CBS Playhouse and the early drama series Playhouse 90 that broadcast in the late 1950s.

== Episodes ==
CBS broadcast 12 teleplays over the three television seasons between 1967 and 1970.

=== Season 1 (1967-1968) ===
No. overall	No. in season	Title	Directed by	Written by	Original release date
1	1	"The Final War of Olly Winter"	Paul Bogart	Ronald Ribman	January 29, 1967
Olly Winter, an African-American Master Sergeant in the Vietnam War, is walking back to allied-controlled land following a battle with the Viet Cong. Along the way, he meets up with a Vietnamese girl, an orphaned infant, and a dog.
2	2	"Do Not Go Gentle into That Good Night"	George Schaefer	Loring Mandel	October 17, 1967
The title of the episode is taken from the first line of a Dylan Thomas poem, which tells the story of a carpenter who has built his own home, but is now too old and infirm to live on his own, and is sent to live in an old age home against his desires.
3	3	"Dear Friends"	Paul Bogart	Reginald Rose	December 6, 1967
The episode was a two-part installment about a married couple looking at divorce, and the attempts of their friends to try to repair their marriage becoming a look at the relationships that they themselves have.
4	4	"My Father and My Mother"	George Schaefer	Robert J. Crean	February 13, 1968
A New York editor struggling as a husband and parent looks back and learns of the difficulties his own parents faced in life.
5	5	"Secrets"	Paul Bogart	Tad Mosel	May 5, 1968
A wife believes her husband is hiding something from her and the secrets between the two threaten to split them apart.

=== Season 2 (1968-1969) ===
No. overall	No. in season	Title	Directed by	Written by	Original release date
6	1	"The People Next Door"	David Greene	J. P. Miller	October 15, 1968
A family deals with the daughter's use of LSD.
7	2	"Saturday Adoption"	Delbert Mann	Ron Cowen	December 4, 1968
A young white man about to enter law school meets a young black man, Macy, when he volunteers to tutor urban youths.
8	3	"The Experiment"	Robert Butler	Ellen M. Violett	February 25, 1969
A young scientist who puts aside his liberal principles to work for a cutting-edge chemical company.
9	4	"Shadow Game"	Paul Bogart	Loring Mandel	May 7, 1969
Employees of a major firm are trapped in their office building during the Northeast blackout of 1965.

=== Season 3 (1969-1970) ===
No. overall	No. in season	Title	Directed by	Written by	Original release date
10	1	"Appalachian Autumn"	William A. Graham	Earl Hamner, Jr.	October 7, 1969
A VISTA worker attempts to assist the people of the fictional poor coal mining town of Harper's Gap of West Virginia.
11	2	"'Sadbird"	Paul Bogart; William A. Graham	George Bellak	December 1, 1969
A young man finds his own in the toy business after years of rejecting the corporate lifestyle.
12	3	"The Day Before Sunday"	Paul Bogart	Robert J. Crean	February 10, 1970
An unmarried middle-aged woman meets a divorced man on her plane as she flies to attend her niece's graduation.

== Episode status ==
The broadcasts have been preserved in a variety of archives, with all twelve broadcasts archived between the Paley Center for Media, the UCLA film archive, and the Peabody Awards Collection.

== Awards ==
The CBS Playhouse series of broadcasts were nominated for a number of awards over the course of its run. In total, the dramatic series was nominated for twenty-eight Primetime Emmy Awards, including ten wins, and seven Directors Guild of America awards, including three wins. CBS Playhouse was also honored with a Peabody Award in 1967.
