= Shadow Game (CBS Playhouse) =

- CBS Playhouse episode
- Alexandra Hay and William Windom in "Shadow Game"
- Episode no.: Season 2 Episode 4
- Directed by: Paul Bogart
- Written by: Loring Mandel
- Original air date: May 7, 1969
- Running time: 90 minutes

Guest appearances
- Daniel Massey; William Shatner; William Windom; Carol Rossen; Alexandra Hay; Richard Dysart

Episode chronology
| ← Previous "The Experiment" | Next → "Appalachian Autumn" |

"Shadow Game" is the fourth television play episode of the second season of the American television series CBS Playhouse. The episode was broadcast on May 7, 1969. The plot revolves around employees of a major firm trapped in their office building during the Northeast blackout of 1965.

"Shadow Game" had many noteworthy actors and actresses in its cast, including William Shatner, Daniel Massey, William Windom, Alexandra Hay, Doris Roberts, Greg Mullavey, and Richard Dysart. The broadcast also won two Emmy awards, with Paul Bogart for directing and an award for art direction and scenic design.

== Cast ==
- Daniel Massey as Saul Novick
- William Shatner as Peter Hoyt
- William Windom as Art Richardson
- Carol Rossen as Jess
- Alexandra Hay as Gayle
- Richard Dysart as Jerry Arnst
- Doris Roberts as Shimmy
- Norma Crane as Patti
- Maria Tucci as Carmen
- Jane Elliot as Rita
- Jason Wingreen
- Greg Mullavey
