= Primetime Emmy Award for Outstanding Writing for a Drama Series =

Award for drama series writing

- Awarded for: Outstanding Writing for a Drama Series
- Country: United States
- Presented by: Academy of Television Arts & Sciences
- First award: 1955
- Currently held by: Vince Gilligan, Pluribus (2026)
- Website: emmys.com

The Primetime Emmy Award for Outstanding Writing for a Drama Series is an award presented annually by the Academy of Television Arts & Sciences (ATAS). It was first awarded at the 7th Primetime Emmy Awards ceremony, held in 1955 and it is given in honor of a writer or writers who produced an outstanding story or screenplay for an episode of a television drama series during the primetime network season. Undergoing several name changes, the award received its current title at the 48th Primetime Emmy Awards in 1996.

Since its inception, the award has been presented to 75 writers. Dan Gilroy is the current recipient of the award for his work on the episode of Disney+'s Andor titled "Welcome to the Rebellion". Rod Serling holds the record for most wins for this category at six. The Sopranos holds the record for most wins and nominations for this category at 6 and 21, respectively. Game of Thrones, Hill Street Blues and The Sopranos are the only shows that have been nominated in 7 different years.

== Winners and nominations ==
Listed below are the winners of the award for each year, as well as the other nominees.

Table key
Indicates the winner

=== 1950s ===
Year	Program	Episode	Nominee(s)	Network
Best Written Dramatic Material
1955 (7th)	Studio One	"Twelve Angry Men" (Note: Nominated for Best Individual Program of the Year)	Reginald Rose	CBS
1955 (7th)	Climax!	"An Error in Chemistry"	David Dortort	CBS
1955 (7th)	Four Star Playhouse	"The Answer"	Leonard Freeman	CBS
1955 (7th)	Medic	"White Is the Color"	James Moser	NBC
1955 (7th)	The Philco Television Playhouse		Paddy Chayefsky	NBC
1956 (8th)
1956 (8th)	Best Original Teleplay Writing			
1956 (8th)	Kraft Television Theatre	"Patterns"	Rod Serling	NBC
1956 (8th)	Alcoa-Goodyear Playhouse	"A Catered Affair"	Paddy Chayefsky	NBC
1956 (8th)	Alcoa-Goodyear Playhouse	"Thunder Over Washington"	David Davidson	NBC
1956 (8th)	The Philco Television Playhouse	"A Man Is Ten Feet Tall"	Robert Alan Aurthur	NBC
1956 (8th)	The United States Steel Hour	"Fearful Decision"	Cyril Hume and Richard Maibaum	CBS
1956 (8th)	Best Television Adaptation			
1956 (8th)	Ford Star Jubilee	"The Caine Mutiny Court-Martial" (Note: Nominated for Best Single Program of the Year)	Paul Gregory and Franklin J. Schaffner	CBS
1956 (8th)	The 20th Century Fox Hour	"The Miracle on 34th Street"	John Monks	CBS
1956 (8th)	The 20th Century Fox Hour	"The Ox-Bow Incident"	David Dortort	CBS
1956 (8th)	Climax!	"The Champion"	Rod Serling	CBS
1956 (8th)	Producers' Showcase	"Our Town"	David Shaw	NBC
1957 (9th)
1957 (9th)	Best Teleplay Writing – Half Hour or Less			
1957 (9th)	Alfred Hitchcock Presents	"Fog Closing In"	James P. Cavanagh	CBS
1957 (9th)	Frontier	"Patrol"	Morton Fine and David Friedkin	NBC
1957 (9th)	The Life and Legend of Wyatt Earp	"The Buntime"	Dan Ullman	ABC
1957 (9th)	The Loretta Young Show	"The Pearl"	Richard Morris	NBC
1957 (9th)	Telephone Time	"Man with the Beard"	John Nesbitt	ABC
1957 (9th)	Best Teleplay Writing – One Hour or More			
1957 (9th)	Playhouse 90	"Requiem for a Heavyweight" (Note: Won Best Single Program of the Year)	Rod Serling	CBS
1957 (9th)	Alcoa-Goodyear Playhouse	"Joey"	Louis Peterson	NBC
1957 (9th)	Alcoa-Goodyear Playhouse	"Tragedy in a Temporary Town"	Reginald Rose	NBC
1957 (9th)	Kraft Television Theatre	"A Night to Remember"	John Whedon and George Roy Hill	NBC
1957 (9th)	Playhouse 90	"Sizeman and Son"	Elick Moll	CBS
1958 (10th)
1958 (10th)	Best Teleplay Writing – Half Hour or Less			
1958 (10th)	Schlitz Playhouse of Stars	"The Lonely Wizard"	Paul Monash	CBS
1958 (10th)	Father Knows Best	"Margaret Hires a Gardener"	Roswell Rogers	NBC
1958 (10th)	Frontiers of Faith	"A Chassidic Tale"	Morton Wishengrad	NBC
1958 (10th)	Gunsmoke	"Born to Hang"	John Meston	CBS
1958 (10th)	Leave It to Beaver	"Beaver Gets 'Spelled"	Joe Connelly and Bob Mosher	CBS
1958 (10th)	Best Teleplay Writing – One Hour or More			
1958 (10th)	Playhouse 90	"The Comedian"	Rod Serling	CBS
1958 (10th)	Hallmark Hall of Fame	"The Green Pastures"	Marc Connelly	NBC
1958 (10th)	Omnibus	"The Life of Samuel Johnson"	James Lee	NBC
1958 (10th)	Playhouse 90	"The Miracle Worker"	William Gibson	CBS
1958 (10th)	Studio One	"No Deadly Medicine"	Arthur Hailey	CBS
1959 (11th)
1959 (11th)	Best Writing of a Single Program of a Dramatic Series - Less Than One Hour			
1959 (11th)	Alcoa-Goodyear Theatre	"Eddie"	Alfred Brenner and Ken Hughes	NBC
1959 (11th)	Alcoa-Goodyear Theatre	"The Loudmouth"	Christopher Knopf	NBC
1959 (11th)	Alfred Hitchcock Presents	"Lamb to the Slaughter"	Roald Dahl	CBS
1959 (11th)	General Electric Theater	"One is a Wanderer"	Samuel A. Taylor	CBS
1959 (11th)	Peter Gunn	"The Kill"	Blake Edwards	NBC
1959 (11th)	Best Writing of a Single Dramatic Program - One Hour or Longer			
1959 (11th)	Hallmark Hall of Fame	"Little Moon of Alban" (Note: Nominated for Most Outstanding Single Program of the Year)	James Costigan	NBC
1959 (11th)	Playhouse 90	"Child of Our Time"	Irving G. Neiman	CBS
1959 (11th)	Playhouse 90	"Days of Wine and Roses"	JP Miller	CBS
1959 (11th)	Playhouse 90	"Old Man"	Horton Foote	CBS
1959 (11th)	Playhouse 90	"A Town Has Turned to Dust"	Rod Serling	CBS

=== 1960s ===
Year	Program	Episode	Nominee(s)	Network
Outstanding Writing Achievement in Drama
1960 (12th)	The Twilight Zone		Rod Serling	CBS
1960 (12th)	Ford Startime	"The Turn of the Screw"	James Costigan	NBC
1960 (12th)	Playhouse 90	"Project Immortality"	Loring Mandel	CBS
1961 (16th)	The Twilight Zone		Rod Serling	CBS
1961 (16th)	DuPont Show of the Month	"The Lincoln Murder Case"	Dale Wasserman	CBS
1961 (16th)	NBC Sunday Showcase	"Sacco-Vanzetti Story" (Note: Nominated for Program of the Year)	Reginald Rose	NBC
1962 (14th)
1962 (14th)	The Defenders		Reginald Rose	CBS
1962 (14th)	Alcoa Premiere	"People Need People"	Henry F. Greenberg	ABC
1962 (14th)	Ben Casey	"I Remember a Lemon Tree"	Story by : Marcus W. Demian; Teleplay by : Jack Laird	ABC
1962 (14th)	The Dick Powell Show	"The Price of Tomatoes"	Richard Alan Simmons	NBC
1962 (14th)	The Twilight Zone		Rod Serling	CBS
1963 (15th)
1963 (15th)	The Defenders	"The Madman"	Robert Thom and Reginald Rose	CBS
1963 (15th)	Ben Casey	"A Cardinal Act of Mercy"	Norman Katkov	ABC
1963 (15th)	The DuPont Show of the Week	"Big Deal in Laredo"	Sidney Carroll	NBC
1963 (15th)	Hallmark Hall of Fame	"The Invincible Mr. Disraeli"	James Lee	NBC
1963 (15th)	Premiere, Presented by Fred Astaire	"The Voice of Charlie Pont"	Halsted Welles	ABC
1964 (16th)
1964 (16th)	Outstanding Writing Achievement in Drama – Original			
1964 (16th)	The Defenders	"Blacklist"	Ernest Kinoy	CBS
1964 (16th)	Bob Hope Presents the Chrysler Theatre	"Something About Lee Wiley"	David Rayfiel	NBC
1964 (16th)	Breaking Point	"And James Was a Very Small Snail"	Allan Sloane	ABC
1964 (16th)	Dr. Kildare	"What's God to Julius?"	Adrian Spies	NBC
1964 (16th)	East Side/West Side	"Who Do You Kill?"	Arnold Perl	CBS
1964 (16th)	Outstanding Writing Achievement in Drama – Adaptation			
1964 (16th)	Bob Hope Presents the Chrysler Theatre	"It's Mental Work"	Rod Serling	NBC
1964 (16th)	The Alfred Hitchcock Hour	"The Jar"	James Bridges	CBS
1964 (16th)	Hallmark Hall of Fame	"The Patriots"	Robert Hartung	NBC
1964 (16th)	The Richard Boone Show	"The Hooligan"	Walter Newman	NBC
Outstanding Individual Achievements in Entertainment – Writers
1965 (17th)	The Defenders	"The 700-Year-Old Gang"	David Karp	CBS
1965 (17th)	The Dick Van Dyke Show	"Never Bathe on Sunday"	Carl Reiner	CBS
1965 (17th)	Hallmark Hall of Fame	"The Magnificent Yankee"	Robert Hartung	NBC
1965 (17th)	That Was the Week That Was		William Boardman, Dee Caruso, Robert Emmett, David Frost, Gerald Gardner, Buck Henry, Joseph Hurley, Thomas Meehan, Herb Sargent, Larry Siegel, Gloria Steinem, Jim Stevenson, Calvin Trillin and Saul Turteltaub	NBC
1965 (17th)	The Wonderful World of Burlesque		Arnie Rosen and Coleman Jacoby	NBC
Outstanding Writing Achievement in Drama
1966 (18th)	Hallmark Hall of Fame	"Eagle in a Cage" (Note: Nominated for Outstanding Dramatic Program)	Millard Lampell	NBC
1966 (18th)	Bob Hope Presents the Chrysler Theatre	"The Game"	S. Lee Pogostin	NBC
1966 (18th)	I Spy	"A Cup of Kindness"	Morton Fine and David Friedkin	NBC
1967 (19th)	Mission: Impossible	"Pilot"	Bruce Geller	CBS
1967 (19th)	CBS Playhouse	"The Final War of Olly Winter"	Ronald Ribman	CBS
1967 (19th)	I Spy	"The War Lord"	Robert Culp	NBC
1968 (20th)
1968 (20th)	CBS Playhouse	"Do Not Go Gentle Into That Good Night"	Loring Mandel	CBS
1968 (20th)	CBS Playhouse	"Dear Friends"	Reginald Rose	CBS
1968 (20th)	Mission: Impossible	"The Seal"	William Read Woodfield and Allan Balter	CBS
1968 (20th)	NBC World Premiere Movie	"Ironside"	Don Mankiewicz	NBC
1969 (21st)
1969 (21st)	CBS Playhouse	"The People Next Door"	JP Miller	CBS
1969 (21st)	CBS Playhouse	"The Experiment"	Ellen M. Violett	CBS
1969 (21st)	Hallmark Hall of Fame	"Teacher, Teacher" (Note: Won Outstanding Dramatic Program)	Allan Sloane	NBC

=== 1970s ===
Year	Program	Episode	Nominee(s)	Network
Outstanding Writing Achievement in Drama
1970 (22nd)
1970 (22nd)	NBC World Premiere Movie	"My Sweet Charlie"	Richard Levinson and William Link	NBC
1970 (22nd)	The ABC Wednesday Night Movie	"Marcus Welby, M.D."	Don Mankiewicz	ABC
1970 (22nd)	CBS Playhouse	"Sadbird"	George Bellak	CBS
1971 (23rd)
1971 (23rd)	The Bold Ones: The Senator	"To Taste of Death but Once"	Joel Oliansky	NBC
1971 (23rd)	The Bold Ones: The Senator	"A Continual Roar of Musketry"	David W. Rintels	NBC
1971 (23rd)	Four in One	"The Psychiatrist"	Jerrold Freedman	NBC
1972 (24th)
1972 (24th)	Columbo	"Death Lends a Hand"	Richard Levinson and William Link	NBC
1972 (24th)	Columbo	"Murder by the Book"	Steven Bochco	NBC
1972 (24th)	Columbo	"Suitable for Framing"	Jackson Gillis	NBC
1973 (25th)
1973 (25th)	The Waltons	"The Scholar"	John McGreevey	CBS
1973 (25th)	Columbo	"Etude in Black"	Story by : Richard Levinson and William Link; Teleplay by : Steven Bochco	NBC
1973 (25th)	The Waltons	"The Love Story"	Earl Hamner Jr.	CBS
Best Writing in Drama
1974 (26th)
1974 (26th)	The Waltons	"The Thanksgiving Story"	Joanna Lee	CBS
1974 (26th)	Kojak	"Death Is Not a Passing Grade"	Gene R. Kearney	CBS
1974 (26th)	The Waltons	"The Easter Story"	John McGreevey	CBS
Outstanding Writing in a Drama Series
1975 (27th)
1975 (27th)	Benjamin Franklin (Note: Won Outstanding Limited Series)	"The Ambassador"	Howard Fast	CBS
1975 (27th)	Benjamin Franklin	"The Whirlwind"	Loring Mandel	CBS
1975 (27th)	Police Story	"Robbery: 48 Hours"	Robert L. Collins	NBC
1975 (27th)	Upstairs, Downstairs	"The Bolter"	John Hawkesworth	PBS
1975 (27th)	Upstairs, Downstairs	"Miss Forrest"	Alfred Shaughnessy	PBS
1976 (28th)
1976 (28th)	The Adams Chronicles (Note: Nominated for Outstanding Limited Series)	"John Adams and Lawyer"	Sherman Yellen	PBS
1976 (28th)	Jennie: Lady Randolph Churchill	"Lady Randolph"	Julian Mitchell	PBS
1976 (28th)	The Law	"Complaint Amended"	Joel Oliansky	NBC
1976 (28th)	Rich Man, Poor Man	"Part I"	Dean Riesner	ABC
1976 (28th)	Upstairs, Downstairs	"Another Year"	Alfred Shaughnessy	PBS
1977 (29th)
1977 (29th)	Roots	"Part II"	Ernest Kinoy and William Blinn	ABC
1977 (29th)	The Adams Chronicles	"Charles Francis Adams: Minister to Great Britain"	Roger O. Hirson	PBS
1977 (29th)	The Adams Chronicles	"John Quincy Adams: President"	Tad Mosel	PBS
1977 (29th)	Roots	"Part V"	James Lee	ABC
1977 (29th)	Roots	"Part VIII"	M. Charles Cohen	ABC
1978 (30th)
1978 (30th)	Holocaust		Gerald Green	NBC
1978 (30th)	The Dain Curse		Robert W. Lenski	CBS
1978 (30th)	King		Abby Mann	NBC
1978 (30th)	Meeting of Minds		Steve Allen	PBS
1978 (30th)	The Norman Conquests		Alan Ayckbourn	PBS
1979 (31st)
1979 (31st)	Lou Grant	"Dying"	Michele Gallery	CBS
1979 (31st)	Lou Grant	"Marathon"	Gene Reynolds	CBS
1979 (31st)	Lou Grant	"Vet"	Leon Tokatyan	CBS
1979 (31st)	The Paper Chase	"The Late Mr. Hart"	James Bridges	CBS

=== 1980s ===
Year	Program	Episode	Nominee(s)	Network
1980 (32nd)
1980 (32nd)	Lou Grant	"Cop"	Seth Freeman	CBS
1980 (32nd)	Lou Grant	"Brushfire"	Allan Burns and Gene Reynolds	CBS
1980 (32nd)	Lou Grant	"Lou"	Michele Gallery	CBS
1980 (32nd)	Skag	"Pilot"	Abby Mann	NBC
1980 (32nd)	Tenspeed and Brown Shoe	"Pilot"	Stephen J. Cannell	ABC
1981 (33rd)
1981 (33rd)	Hill Street Blues	"Hill Street Station"	Steven Bochco and Michael Kozoll	NBC
1981 (33rd)	American Dream	"Pilot"	Ronald M. Cohen, Barbara Corday and Ken Hecht	ABC
1981 (33rd)	Hill Street Blues	"Jungle Madness"	Steven Bochco, Michael Kozoll and Anthony Yerkovich	NBC
1981 (33rd)	Lou Grant	"Rape"	Seth Freeman	CBS
1981 (33rd)	Lou Grant	"Strike"	April Smith	CBS
1982 (34th)
1982 (34th)	Hill Street Blues	"Freedom's Last Stand"	Story by : Michael Kozoll and Steven Bochco; Teleplay by : Steven Bochco, Anthony Yerkovich, Jeffrey Lewis and Michael Wagner	NBC
1982 (34th)	Hill Street Blues	"Personal Foul"	Steven Bochco, Anthony Yerkovich, Jeffrey Lewis and Michael Wagner	NBC
1982 (34th)	Hill Street Blues	"The Second Oldest Profession"	Story by : Michael Kozoll, Steven Bochco and Anthony Yerkovich; Teleplay by : Steven Bochco, Anthony Yerkovich and Robert Crais	NBC
1982 (34th)	Hill Street Blues	"The World According to Freedom"	Michael Wagner	NBC
1982 (34th)	Lou Grant	"Blacklist"	Seth Freeman	CBS
1983 (35th)
1983 (35th)	Hill Street Blues	"Trial by Fury"	David Milch	NBC
1983 (35th)	Hill Street Blues	"Eugene's Comedy Empire Strikes Back"	Story by : Steven Bochco, Anthony Yerkovich and Jeff Lewis; Teleplay by : Anthony Yerkovich, David Milch and Karen Hall	NBC
1983 (35th)	Hill Street Blues	"A Hair of the Dog"	Steven Bochco, Anthony Yerkovich and Jeffrey Lewis	NBC
1983 (35th)	Hill Street Blues	"No Body's Perfect"	Story by : Steven Bochco, Anthony Yerkovich and Jeffrey Lewis; Teleplay by : Michael I. Wagner and David Milch	NBC
1983 (35th)	Hill Street Blues	"Officer of the Year"	Karen Hall	NBC
1984 (36th)
1984 (36th)	St. Elsewhere	"The Women"	Story by : John Masius and Tom Fontana; Teleplay by : John Ford Noonan	NBC
1984 (36th)	Hill Street Blues	"Doris in Wonderland"	Story by : Steven Bochco, Jeffrey Lewis and David Milch; Teleplay by : Peter Silverman	NBC
1984 (36th)	Hill Street Blues	"Grace Under Pressure"	Story by : Steven Bochco, Jeffrey Lewis and David Milch; Teleplay by : Jeffrey Lewis, Michael I. Wagner, Karen Hall and Mark Frost	NBC
1984 (36th)	St. Elsewhere	"All About Eve"	John Masius and Tom Fontana	NBC
1984 (36th)	St. Elsewhere	"Newheart"	John Masius, Tom Fontana, Garn Stephens and Emilie R. Small	NBC
1984 (36th)	St. Elsewhere	"Qui Transulit Sustinet"	Story by : John Masius and Tom Fontana; Teleplay by : John Tinker & Mark Tinker	NBC
1985 (37th)
1985 (37th)	Cagney & Lacey	"Who Said It's Fair, Part 2"	Patricia Green	CBS
1985 (37th)	Cagney & Lacey	"Child Witness"	Deborah Arakelian	CBS
1985 (37th)	Hill Street Blues	"The Rise and Fall of Paul the Wall"	Story by : Michael I. Wagner; Teleplay by : Jacob Epstein	NBC
1985 (37th)	Miami Vice	"Pilot"	Anthony Yerkovich	NBC
1985 (37th)	St. Elsewhere	"Murder, She Rote"	John Masius, Tom Fontana and Steve Bello	NBC
1985 (37th)	St. Elsewhere	"Sweet Dreams"	John Masius and Tom Fontana	NBC
1986 (38th)
1986 (38th)	St. Elsewhere	"Time Heals"	John Tinker, Tom Fontana and John Masius	NBC
1986 (38th)	Hill Street Blues	"What Are Friends For?"	Dick Wolf	NBC
1986 (38th)	Moonlighting	"The Dream Sequence Always Rings Twice"	Debra Frank and Carl Sautter	ABC
1986 (38th)	Moonlighting	"Twas the Episode Before Christmas"	Glenn Gordon Caron	ABC
1986 (38th)	St. Elsewhere	"Haunted"	Story by : John Masius and Tom Fontana; Teleplay by : John Tinker, Charles H. Eglee and Channing Gibson	NBC
1987 (39th)
1987 (39th)	L.A. Law	"The Venus Butterfly"	Steven Bochco and Terry Louise Fisher	NBC
1987 (39th)	Cagney & Lacey	"Turn, Turn, Turn, Part 1"	Georgia Jeffries	CBS
1987 (39th)	Hill Street Blues	"It Ain't Over Till It's Over"	Jeffrey Lewis, David Milch and John Romano	NBC
1987 (39th)	L.A. Law	"Sidney the Dead-Nosed Reindeer"	William M. Finkelstein	NBC
1987 (39th)	Moonlighting	"I Am Curious... Maddie"	Story by : Ron Osborn, Karen Hall, Roger Director and Charles H. Eglee; Teleplay by : Jeff Reno and Glenn Gordon Caron	ABC
1987 (39th)	Moonlighting	"Atomic Shakespeare"	Jeff Reno and Ron Osborn	ABC
1987 (39th)	St. Elsewhere	"Afterlife"	Tom Fontana, John Tinker and John Masius	NBC
1988 (40th)
1988 (40th)	Thirtysomething	"Business as Usual"	Paul Haggis and Marshall Herskovitz	ABC
1988 (40th)	Beauty and the Beast	"Pilot"	Ron Koslow	CBS
1988 (40th)	China Beach	"Pilot"	John Sacret Young	ABC
1988 (40th)	L.A. Law	"Beauty and Obese"	Terry Louise Fisher and David E. Kelley	NBC
1988 (40th)	L.A. Law	"Full Martial Jacket"	Story by : Steven Bochco and Terry Louise Fisher; Teleplay by : Terry Louise Fisher and David E. Kelley	NBC
1988 (40th)	St. Elsewhere	"The Last One"	Story by : Tom Fontana, John Tinker and Channing Gibson; Teleplay by : Bruce Paltrow and Mark Tinker	NBC
1989 (41st)
1989 (41st)	Thirtysomething	"First Day/Last Day"	Joseph Dougherty	ABC
1989 (41st)	L.A. Law	"His Suit Is Hirsute"	Steven Bochco, David E. Kelley, Michele Gallery and William M. Finkelstein	NBC
1989 (41st)	L.A. Law	"I'm in the Nude for Love"	David E. Kelley	NBC
1989 (41st)	L.A. Law	"Urine Trouble Now"	David E. Kelley, William M. Finkelstein, Michele Gallery and Judith Parker	NBC
1989 (41st)	Thirtysomething	"The Mike Van Dyke Show"	Marshall Herskovitz and Edward Zwick	ABC

=== 1990s ===
Year	Program	Episode	Nominee(s)	Network
1990 (42nd)	L.A. Law	"Blood, Sweat & Fears"	David E. Kelley	NBC
1990 (42nd)	L.A. Law	"Bang... Zoom... Zap"	William M. Finkelstein and David E. Kelley	NBC
1990 (42nd)	Thirtysomething	"The Go Between"	Joseph Dougherty	ABC
1990 (42nd)	Twin Peaks	"Pilot"	Mark Frost and David Lynch	ABC
1990 (42nd)	Twin Peaks	"Episode 3"	Harley Peyton	ABC
1991 (43rd)	L.A. Law	"On the Toad Again"	David E. Kelley	NBC
1991 (43rd)	L.A. Law	"Lie Harder"	Judith Feldman and Sarah Woodside Gallagher	NBC
1991 (43rd)	L.A. Law	"Mutinies on the Banzai"	Alan Brennert, Patricia Green and David E. Kelley	NBC
1991 (43rd)	Northern Exposure	"Pilot"	Joshua Brand and John Falsey	CBS
1991 (43rd)	Thirtysomething	"Second Look"	Ann Lewis Hamilton	ABC
1992 (44th)	Northern Exposure	"Seoul Mates"	Diane Frolov and Andrew Schneider	CBS
1992 (44th)	China Beach	"Hello-Goodbye"	Story by : John Sacret Young, John Wells, Lydia Woodward and Carol Flint; Teleplay by : John Wells	ABC
1992 (44th)	I'll Fly Away	"Master Magician"	David Chase	NBC
1992 (44th)	Northern Exposure	"Burning Down the House"	Robin Green	CBS
1992 (44th)	Northern Exposure	"Democracy in America"	Jeff Melvoin	CBS
1993 (45th)	Homicide: Life on the Street	"Three Men and Adena"	Tom Fontana	NBC
1993 (45th)	Homefront	"The Lacemakers"	Bernard Lechowick	ABC
1993 (45th)	Law & Order	"Manhood"	Story by : Walon Green and Robert Nathan; Teleplay by : Robert Nathan	NBC
1993 (45th)	Northern Exposure	"Kaddish for Uncle Manny"	Jeff Melvoin	CBS
1993 (45th)	Northern Exposure	"Midnight Sun"	Geoffrey Neigher	CBS
1994 (46th)	NYPD Blue	"Steroid Roy"	Ann Biderman	ABC
1994 (46th)	NYPD Blue	"NYPD Lou"	Ted Mann	ABC
1994 (46th)	NYPD Blue	"Personal Foul"	Story by : David Milch; Teleplay by : Burton Armus	ABC
1994 (46th)	NYPD Blue	"Pilot"	Story by : David Milch and Steven Bochco; Teleplay by : David Milch	ABC
1994 (46th)	NYPD Blue	"Tempest in a C-Cup"	Gardner Stern	ABC
1995 (47th)	ER	"Love's Labor Lost"	Lance Gentile	NBC
1995 (47th)	ER	"24 Hours"	Michael Crichton	NBC
1995 (47th)	My So-Called Life	"Pilot"	Winnie Holzman	ABC
1995 (47th)	NYPD Blue	"Simone Says"	Story by : Steven Bochco, David Milch and Walon Green; Teleplay by : David Milch and Walon Green	ABC
1995 (47th)	The X-Files	"Duane Barry"	Chris Carter	Fox
1996 (48th)	The X-Files	"Clyde Bruckman's Final Repose"	Darin Morgan	Fox
1996 (48th)	ER	"The Healers"	John Wells	NBC
1996 (48th)	ER	"Hell and High Water"	Neal Baer	NBC
1996 (48th)	Murder One	"Chapter One"	Story by : Steven Bochco, Charles H. Eglee and Channing Gibson; Teleplay by : Charles H. Eglee, Channing Gibson, Steven Bochco and David Milch	ABC
1996 (48th)	NYPD Blue	"The Backboard Jungle"	Story by : William L. Morris; Teleplay by : David Mills	ABC
1997 (49th)	NYPD Blue	"Where's 'Swaldo?"	Stephen Gaghan, Michael R. Perry and David Milch	ABC
1997 (49th)	ER	"Faith"	John Wells	NBC
1997 (49th)	ER	"Whose Appy Now?"	Neal Baer	NBC
1997 (49th)	NYPD Blue	"Taillight's Last Gleaming"	David Mills	ABC
1997 (49th)	The X-Files	"Memento Mori"	Chris Carter, Vince Gilligan, John Shiban and Frank Spotnitz	Fox
1998 (50th)	NYPD Blue	"Lost Israel, Part 2"	Story by : David Milch and Bill Clark; Teleplay by : David Milch and Nicholas Wootton	ABC
1998 (50th)	Homicide: Life on the Street	"Subway"	James Yoshimura	NBC
1998 (50th)	NYPD Blue	"Lost Israel, Part 1"	Story by : Ted Mann, Bill Clark and Meredith Stiehm; Teleplay by : David Milch and Ted Mann	ABC
1998 (50th)	The Practice	"Betrayal"	David E. Kelley	ABC
1998 (50th)	The X-Files	"The Post-Modern Prometheus"	Chris Carter	Fox
1999 (51st)	The Sopranos	"College"	James Manos Jr. and David Chase	HBO
1999 (51st)	NYPD Blue	"Hearts and Souls"	Story by : Steven Bochco, David Milch and Bill Clark; Teleplay by : Nicholas Wootton	ABC
1999 (51st)	The Sopranos	"Isabella"	Robin Green and Mitchell Burgess	HBO
1999 (51st)	The Sopranos	"Nobody Knows Anything"	Frank Renzulli	HBO
1999 (51st)	The Sopranos	"The Sopranos"	David Chase	HBO

=== 2000s ===
Year	Program	Episode	Nominee(s)	Network
2000 (52nd)	The West Wing	"In Excelsis Deo"	Aaron Sorkin and Rick Cleveland	NBC
2000 (52nd)	Buffy the Vampire Slayer	"Hush"	Joss Whedon	The WB
2000 (52nd)	The Sopranos	"Funhouse"	David Chase and Todd A. Kessler	HBO
2000 (52nd)	The Sopranos	"The Knight in White Satin Armor"	Robin Green and Mitchell Burgess	HBO
2000 (52nd)	The West Wing	"Pilot"	Aaron Sorkin	NBC
2001 (53rd)	The Sopranos	"Employee of the Month"	Robin Green and Mitchell Burgess	HBO
2001 (53rd)	The Sopranos	"Amour Fou"	Story by : David Chase; Teleplay by : Frank Renzulli	HBO
2001 (53rd)	The Sopranos	"Pine Barrens"	Story by : Tim Van Patten and Terence Winter; Teleplay by : Terence Winter	HBO
2001 (53rd)	The Sopranos	"Second Opinion"	Lawrence Konner	HBO
2001 (53rd)	The West Wing	"In the Shadow of Two Gunmen"	Aaron Sorkin	NBC
2002 (54th)	24	"12:00 a.m. – 1:00 a.m."	Robert Cochran and Joel Surnow	Fox
2002 (54th)	Alias	"Truth Be Told"	J. J. Abrams	ABC
2002 (54th)	ER	"On the Beach"	John Wells	NBC
2002 (54th)	The Shield	"Pilot"	Shawn Ryan	FX
2002 (54th)	The West Wing	"Posse Comitatus"	Aaron Sorkin	NBC
2003 (55th)	The Sopranos	"Whitecaps"	Robin Green, Mitchell Burgess and David Chase	HBO
2003 (55th)	Six Feet Under	"Twilight"	Craig Wright	HBO
2003 (55th)	The Sopranos	"Eloise"	Terence Winter	HBO
2003 (55th)	The Sopranos	"Whoever Did This"	Robin Green and Mitchell Burgess	HBO
2003 (55th)	The West Wing	"Twenty Five"	Aaron Sorkin	NBC
2004 (56th)	The Sopranos	"Long Term Parking"	Terence Winter	HBO
2004 (56th)	Deadwood	"Deadwood"	David Milch	HBO
2004 (56th)	The Sopranos	"Irregular Around the Margins"	Robin Green and Mitchell Burgess	HBO
2004 (56th)	The Sopranos	"Unidentified Black Males"	Matthew Weiner and Terence Winter	HBO
2004 (56th)	The Sopranos	"Where's Johnny?"	Michael Caleo	HBO
2005 (57th)	House	"Three Stories"	David Shore	Fox
2005 (57th)	Lost	"Pilot"	Story by : Jeffrey Lieber, J. J. Abrams and Damon Lindelof; Teleplay by : J. J. Abrams and Damon Lindelof	ABC
2005 (57th)	Lost	Walkabout"	David Fury	ABC
2005 (57th)	Rescue Me	"Guts"	Denis Leary and Peter Tolan	FX
2005 (57th)	The Wire	"Middle Ground"	Story by : David Simon and George Pelecanos; Teleplay by : George Pelecanos	HBO
2006 (58th)	The Sopranos	"Members Only"	Terence Winter	HBO
2006 (58th)	Grey's Anatomy	"Into You Like a Train"	Krista Vernoff	ABC
2006 (58th)	Grey's Anatomy	"It's the End of the World" & "As We Know It"	Shonda Rhimes	ABC
2006 (58th)	Lost	"The 23rd Psalm"	Carlton Cuse and Damon Lindelof	ABC
2006 (58th)	Six Feet Under	"Everyone's Waiting"	Alan Ball	HBO
2007 (59th)	The Sopranos	"Made in America"	David Chase	HBO
2007 (59th)	Battlestar Galactica	"Occupation" & "Precipice"	Ronald D. Moore	Sci Fi
2007 (59th)	Lost	"Through the Looking Glass"	Carlton Cuse and Damon Lindelof	ABC
2007 (59th)	The Sopranos	"Kennedy and Heidi"	Matthew Weiner and David Chase	HBO
2007 (59th)	The Sopranos	"The Second Coming"	Terence Winter	HBO
2008 (60th)	Mad Men	"Smoke Gets in Your Eyes"	Matthew Weiner	AMC
2008 (60th)	Battlestar Galactica	"Six of One"	Michael Angeli	Sci Fi
2008 (60th)	Damages	"Get Me a Lawyer"	Todd A. Kessler, Glenn Kessler and Daniel Zelman	FX
2008 (60th)	Mad Men	"The Wheel"	Matthew Weiner and Robin Veith	AMC
2008 (60th)	The Wire	"–30–"	Story by : David Simon and Ed Burns; Teleplay by : David Simon	HBO
2009 (61st)	Mad Men	"Meditations in an Emergency"	Matthew Weiner and Kater Gordon	AMC
2009 (61st)	Lost	"The Incident"	Carlton Cuse and Damon Lindelof	ABC
2009 (61st)	Mad Men	"The Jet Set"	Matthew Weiner	AMC
2009 (61st)	Mad Men	"A Night to Remember"	Robin Veith and Matthew Weiner	AMC
2009 (61st)	Mad Men	"Six Month Leave"	Andre Jacquemetton, Maria Jacquemetton and Matthew Weiner	AMC

=== 2010s ===
Year	Program	Episode	Nominee(s)	Network
2010 (62nd)	Mad Men	"Shut the Door. Have a Seat."	Matthew Weiner and Erin Levy	AMC
2010 (62nd)	Friday Night Lights	"The Son"	Rolin Jones	DirecTV
2010 (62nd)	The Good Wife	"Pilot"	Robert King and Michelle King	CBS
2010 (62nd)	Lost	"The End"	Damon Lindelof and Carlton Cuse	ABC
2010 (62nd)	Mad Men	"Guy Walks Into an Advertising Agency"	Robin Veith and Matthew Weiner	AMC
2011 (63rd)	Friday Night Lights	"Always"	Jason Katims	DirecTV
2011 (63rd)	Game of Thrones	"Baelor"	David Benioff and D. B. Weiss	HBO
2011 (63rd)	The Killing	"Pilot"	Veena Sud	AMC
2011 (63rd)	Mad Men	"Blowing Smoke"	Andre Jacquemetton and Maria Jacquemetton	AMC
2011 (63rd)	Mad Men	"The Suitcase"	Matthew Weiner	AMC
2012 (64th)	Homeland	"Pilot"	Alex Gansa, Howard Gordon and Gideon Raff	Showtime
2012 (64th)	Downton Abbey	"Episode Seven"	Julian Fellowes	PBS
2012 (64th)	Mad Men	"Commissions and Fees"	Andre Jacquemetton and Maria Jacquemetton	AMC
2012 (64th)	Mad Men	"Far Away Places"	Semi Chellas and Matthew Weiner	AMC
2012 (64th)	Mad Men	"The Other Woman"	Semi Chellas and Matthew Weiner	AMC
2013 (65th)	Homeland	"Q&A"	Henry Bromell	Showtime
2013 (65th)	Breaking Bad	"Dead Freight"	George Mastras	AMC
2013 (65th)	Breaking Bad	"Say My Name"	Thomas Schnauz	AMC
2013 (65th)	Downton Abbey	"Episode Four"	Julian Fellowes	PBS
2013 (65th)	Game of Thrones	"The Rains of Castamere"	David Benioff and D. B. Weiss	HBO
2014 (66th)	Breaking Bad	"Ozymandias"	Moira Walley-Beckett	AMC
2014 (66th)	Breaking Bad	"Felina"	Vince Gilligan	AMC
2014 (66th)	Game of Thrones	"The Children"	David Benioff and D. B. Weiss	HBO
2014 (66th)	House of Cards	"Chapter 14"	Beau Willimon	Netflix
2014 (66th)	True Detective	"The Secret Fate of All Life"	Nic Pizzolatto	HBO
2015 (67th)	Game of Thrones	"Mother's Mercy"	David Benioff and D. B. Weiss	HBO
2015 (67th)	The Americans	"Do Mail Robots Dream of Electric Sheep?"	Joshua Brand	FX
2015 (67th)	Better Call Saul	"Five-O"	Gordon Smith	AMC
2015 (67th)	Mad Men	"Lost Horizon"	Semi Chellas and Matthew Weiner	AMC
2015 (67th)	Mad Men	"Person to Person"	Matthew Weiner	AMC
2016 (68th)	Game of Thrones	"Battle of the Bastards"	David Benioff and D. B. Weiss	HBO
2016 (68th)	The Americans	"Persona Non Grata"	Joel Fields and Joe Weisberg	FX
2016 (68th)	Downton Abbey	"Episode Eight"	Julian Fellowes	PBS
2016 (68th)	The Good Wife	"End"	Robert King and Michelle King	CBS
2016 (68th)	Mr. Robot	"eps1.0 hellofriend.mov"	Sam Esmail	USA
2016 (68th)	UnREAL	"Return"	Marti Noxon and Sarah Gertrude Shapiro	Lifetime
2017 (69th)	The Handmaid's Tale	"Offred"	Bruce Miller	Hulu
2017 (69th)	The Americans	"The Soviet Division"	Joel Fields and Joe Weisberg	FX
2017 (69th)	Better Call Saul	"Chicanery"	Gordon Smith	AMC
2017 (69th)	The Crown	"Assassins"	Peter Morgan	Netflix
2017 (69th)	Stranger Things	"Chapter One: The Vanishing of Will Byers"	The Duffer Brothers	Netflix
2017 (69th)	Westworld	"The Bicameral Mind"	Lisa Joy and Jonathan Nolan	HBO
2018 (70th)	The Americans	"START"	Joel Fields and Joe Weisberg	FX
2018 (70th)	The Crown	"Mystery Man"	Peter Morgan	Netflix
2018 (70th)	Game of Thrones	"The Dragon and the Wolf"	David Benioff and D. B. Weiss	HBO
2018 (70th)	The Handmaid's Tale	"June"	Bruce Miller	Hulu
2018 (70th)	Killing Eve	"Nice Face"	Phoebe Waller-Bridge	BBC America
2018 (70th)	Stranger Things	"Chapter Nine: The Gate"	The Duffer Brothers	Netflix
2019 (71st)
2019 (71st)	Succession	"Nobody Is Ever Missing"	Jesse Armstrong	HBO
2019 (71st)	Better Call Saul	"Winner"	Peter Gould and Thomas Schnauz	AMC
2019 (71st)	Bodyguard	"Episode 1"	Jed Mercurio	Netflix
2019 (71st)	Game of Thrones	"The Iron Throne"	David Benioff and D. B. Weiss	HBO
2019 (71st)	The Handmaid's Tale	"Holly"	Bruce Miller and Kira Snyder	Hulu
2019 (71st)	Killing Eve	"Nice and Neat"	Emerald Fennell	BBC America

=== 2020s ===
Year	Program	Episode	Nominee(s)	Network
2020 (72nd)
2020 (72nd)	Succession	"This Is Not for Tears"	Jesse Armstrong	HBO
2020 (72nd)	Better Call Saul	"Bad Choice Road"	Thomas Schnauz	AMC
2020 (72nd)	Better Call Saul	"Bagman"	Gordon Smith	AMC
2020 (72nd)	The Crown	"Aberfan"	Peter Morgan	Netflix
2020 (72nd)	Ozark	"All In"	Chris Mundy	Netflix
2020 (72nd)	Ozark	"Boss Fight"	John Shiban	Netflix
2020 (72nd)	Ozark	"Fire Pink"	Miki Johnson	Netflix
2021 (73rd)
2021 (73rd)	The Crown	"War"	Peter Morgan	Netflix
2021 (73rd)	The Boys	"What I Know"	Rebecca Sonnenshine	Amazon
2021 (73rd)	The Handmaid's Tale	"Home"	Yahlin Chang	Hulu
2021 (73rd)	Lovecraft Country	"Sundown"	Misha Green	HBO
2021 (73rd)	The Mandalorian	"Chapter 13: The Jedi"	Dave Filoni	Disney+
2021 (73rd)	The Mandalorian	"Chapter 16: The Rescue"	Jon Favreau	Disney+
2021 (73rd)	Pose	"Series Finale"	Ryan Murphy, Brad Falchuk, Steven Canals, Janet Mock and Our Lady J	FX
2022 (74th)
2022 (74th)	Succession	"All the Bells Say"	Jesse Armstrong	HBO
2022 (74th)	Better Call Saul	"Plan and Execution"	Thomas Schnauz	AMC
2022 (74th)	Ozark	"A Hard Way to Go"	Chris Mundy	Netflix
2022 (74th)	Severance	"The We We Are"	Dan Erickson	Apple TV+
2022 (74th)	Squid Game	"One Lucky Day"	Hwang Dong-hyuk	Netflix
2022 (74th)	Yellowjackets	"F Sharp"	Jonathan Lisco, Ashley Lyle and Bart Nickerson	Showtime
2022 (74th)	Yellowjackets	"Pilot"	Ashley Lyle and Bart Nickerson	Showtime
2023 (75th)
2023 (75th)	Succession	"Connor's Wedding"	Jesse Armstrong	HBO
2023 (75th)	Andor	"One Way Out"	Beau Willimon	Disney+
2023 (75th)	Bad Sisters	"The Prick"	Sharon Horgan, Dave Finkel and Brett Baer	Apple TV+
2023 (75th)	Better Call Saul	"Point and Shoot"	Gordon Smith	AMC
2023 (75th)	Better Call Saul	"Saul Gone"	Peter Gould	AMC
2023 (75th)	The Last of Us	"Long, Long Time"	Craig Mazin	HBO
2023 (75th)	The White Lotus	"Arrivederci"	Mike White	HBO
2024 (76th)
2024 (76th)	Slow Horses	"Negotiating with Tigers"	Will Smith	Apple TV+
2024 (76th)	The Crown	"Ritz"	Peter Morgan and Meriel Sheibani-Clare	Netflix
2024 (76th)	Fallout	"The End"	Geneva Robertson-Dworet and Graham Wagner	Prime Video
2024 (76th)	Mr. & Mrs. Smith	"First Date"	Francesca Sloane and Donald Glover	Prime Video
2024 (76th)	Shōgun	"Anjin"	Rachel Kondo and Justin Marks	FX
2024 (76th)	Shōgun	"Crimson Sky"	Rachel Kondo and Caillin Puente	FX
2025 (77th)
2025 (77th)	Andor	"Welcome to the Rebellion"	Dan Gilroy	Disney+
2025 (77th)	The Pitt	"2:00 P.M."	Joe Sachs	HBO Max
2025 (77th)	The Pitt	"7:00 A.M."	R. Scott Gemmill	HBO Max
2025 (77th)	Severance	"Cold Harbor"	Dan Erickson	Apple TV+
2025 (77th)	Slow Horses	"Hello Goodbye"	Will Smith	Apple TV+
2025 (77th)	The White Lotus	"Full-Moon Party"	Mike White	HBO
2026 (78th)
2026 (78th)	Pluribus	"We Is Us"	Vince Gilligan	Apple TV
2026 (78th)	The Diplomat	"Amagansett"	Peter Ackerman and Debora Cahn	Netflix
2026 (78th)	The Pitt	"1:00 P.M."	Kirsten Pierre-Geyfman and R. Scott Gemmill	HBO Max
2026 (78th)	The Pitt	"12:00 P.M."	Valerie Chu	HBO Max
2026 (78th)	Slow Horses	"Scars"	Will Smith	Apple TV
2026 (78th)	Task	"A Still Small Voice"	Brad Ingelsby	HBO

== Total awards by network ==
- CBS – 23
- NBC – 19
- HBO – 12
- ABC – 6
- AMC – 4
- Fox – 3
- Apple TV+ - 2
- Showtime – 2
- DirecTV – 1
- Disney+ - 1
- FX – 1
- Hulu – 1
- Netflix – 1
- PBS – 1

== Individuals with multiple awards ==
6 awards

- Rod Serling (2 consecutive)

4 awards

- Jesse Armstrong (2 consecutive, twice)

3 awards

- Steven Bochco (2 consecutive)
- David Chase
- Tom Fontana
- David Milch (2 consecutive)
- Reginald Rose (2 consecutive)
- Matthew Weiner (consecutive)

2 awards

- David Benioff (consecutive)
- Mitchell Burgess
- Robin Green
- David E. Kelley (consecutive)
- Ernest Kinoy
- Michael Kozoll (consecutive)
- Richard Levinson
- William Link
- John Masius
- D. B. Weiss (consecutive)
- Terence Winter

== Individuals with multiple nominations ==
19 nominations

- Steven Bochco

15 nominations

- David Milch
- Matthew Weiner

11 nominations

- Tom Fontana

10 nominations

- David E. Kelley

9 nominations

- John Masius
- Rod Serling

8 nominations

- David Chase
- Jeff Lewis
- Anthony Yerkovich

7 nominations

- David Benioff
- Robin Green
- D. B. Weiss

6 nominations

- Mitchell Burgess
- Reginald Rose
- Michael Wagner
- Terence Winter

5 nominations

- Damon Lindelof
- Peter Morgan
- Aaron Sorkin
- John Tinker

4 nominations

- Jesse Armstrong
- Carlton Cuse
- William M. Finkelstein
- Michele Gallery
- Karen Hall
- Michael Kozoll
- Thomas Schnauz
- Gordon Smith
- John Wells

3 nominations

- Glenn Gordon Caron
- Chris Carter
- Semi Chellas
- Bill Clark
- Charles H. Eglee
- Julian Fellowes
- Joel Fields
- Terry Louise Fisher
- Seth Freeman
- Channing Gibson
- Vince Gilligan
- Andre Jacquemetton
- Maria Jacquemetton
- James Lee
- Richard Levinson
- William Link
- Loring Mandel
- Bruce Miller
- Will Smith
- Robin Veith
- Joe Weisberg

2 nominations

- J. J. Abrams
- Neal Baer
- Joshua Brand
- James Bridges
- Paddy Chayefsky
- James Costigan
- David Dortort
- Joseph Dougherty
- Matt Duffer
- Ross Duffer
- Dan Erickson
- Morton Fine
- David Friedkin
- Mark Frost
- R. Scott Gemmill
- Peter Gould
- Patricia Green
- Walon Green
- Robert Hartung
- Marshall Herskovitz
- Todd A. Kessler
- Michelle King
- Robert King
- Ernest Kinoy
- Rachel Kondo
- Ashley Lyle
- Don Mankiewicz
- Abby Mann
- Ted Mann
- John McGreevey
- Jeff Melvoin
- JP Miller
- David Mills
- Chris Mundy
- Bart Nickerson
- Ron Osborn
- Jeff Reno
- Frank Renzulli
- Gene Reynolds
- Alfred Shaughnessy
- John Shiban
- David Simon
- Allan Sloane
- Mark Tinker
- Mike White
- Beau Willimon
- Nicholas Wootton
- John Sacret Young

== Programs with multiple awards ==
6 awards

- The Sopranos (HBO) (2 consecutive - twice)

4 awards

- The Defenders (CBS) (3 consecutive)
- Succession (HBO) (2 consecutive - twice)

3 awards

- Hill Street Blues (NBC) (consecutive)
- L.A. Law (NBC) (2 consecutive)
- Mad Men (AMC) (consecutive)
- NYPD Blue (ABC) (2 consecutive)

2 awards

- CBS Playhouse (CBS) (consecutive)
- Game of Thrones (HBO) (consecutive)
- Hallmark Hall of Fame (NBC)
- Homeland (Showtime) (consecutive)
- Lou Grant (CBS) (consecutive)
- Playhouse 90 (CBS) (consecutive)
- St. Elsewhere (NBC)
- Thirtysomething (ABC) (consecutive)
- The Twilight Zone (CBS) (consecutive)
- The Waltons (CBS) (consecutive)

== Programs with multiple nominations ==
21 nominations

- The Sopranos (HBO)

16 nominations

- Hill Street Blues (NBC)

15 nominations

- Mad Men (AMC)

12 nominations

- L.A. Law (NBC)
- NYPD Blue (ABC)

9 nominations

- Lou Grant (CBS)
- Playhouse 90 (CBS)
- St. Elsewhere (NBC)

8 nominations

- Better Call Saul (AMC)

7 nominations

- ER (NBC)
- Game of Thrones (HBO)
- Hallmark Hall of Fame (NBC)

6 nominations

- Alcoa-Goodyear Playhouse (NBC)
- CBS Playhouse (CBS)
- Lost (ABC)
- Northern Exposure (CBS)

5 nominations

- The Crown (Netflix)
- Thirtysomething (ABC)
- The West Wing (NBC)

4 nominations

- The Americans (FX)
- Breaking Bad (AMC)
- Columbo (NBC)
- The Defenders (CBS)
- The Handmaid's Tale (Hulu)
- Moonlighting (ABC)
- Ozark (Netflix)
- The Pitt (HBO Max)
- Succession (HBO)
- The Waltons (CBS)
- The X-Files (Fox)

3 nominations

- The Adams Chronicles (PBS)
- Alfred Hitchcock Presents/The Alfred Hitchcock Hour (CBS)
- Bob Hope Presents the Chrysler Theatre (NBC)
- Cagney & Lacey (CBS)
- Downton Abbey (PBS)
- Roots (ABC)
- Slow Horses (Apple TV+)
- The Twilight Zone (CBS)
- Upstairs, Downstairs (PBS)

2 nominations

- The 20th Century Fox Hour (CBS)
- Alcoa Premiere/Premiere, Presented by Fred Astaire (ABC)
- Andor (Disney+)
- Battlestar Galactica (Sci Fi)
- Ben Casey (ABC)
- Benjamin Franklin (CBS)
- The Bold Ones: The Senator (NBC)
- China Beach (ABC)
- Climax! (CBS)
- Friday Night Lights (DirecTV)
- The Good Wife (CBS)
- Grey's Anatomy (ABC)
- Homeland (Showtime)
- Homicide: Life on the Street (NBC)
- I Spy (NBC)
- Killing Eve (BBC America)
- Kraft Television Theatre (NBC)
- The Mandalorian (Disney+)
- Mission: Impossible (CBS)
- The Philco Television Playhouse (NBC)
- Severance (Apple TV+)
- Shōgun (FX)
- Six Feet Under (HBO)
- Stranger Things (Netflix)
- Studio One (CBS)
- Twin Peaks (ABC)
- The Wire (HBO)
- The White Lotus (HBO)
- Yellowjackets (Showtime)

== See also ==
- Primetime Emmy Award for Outstanding Writing for a Comedy Series
