= Primetime Emmy Award for Outstanding Directing for a Drama Series =

Award for drama series directing

- Awarded for: Outstanding Directing for a Drama Series
- Country: United States
- Presented by: Academy of Television Arts & Sciences
- First award: 1955
- Currently held by: Saul Metzstein, Slow Horses (2026)
- Website: emmys.com

The Primetime Emmy Award for Outstanding Directing for a Drama Series is presented to the best directing of a television drama series, usually for a particular episode. (Note: Though this category is the dominant one in which dramatic directing has been recognized, there were a few years in which the categories were determined by running time, not genre. Until 1979, miniseries and television films competed alongside drama series.)

== Winners and nominations ==
=== 1950s ===
Year	Program	Episode	Nominee(s)	Network
Best Direction
1955	Studio One	"Twelve Angry Men" (Note: Nominated for Best Individual Program of the Year)	Franklin J. Schaffner	CBS
1955	Four Star Playhouse	"The Answer"	Roy Kellino	CBS
1955	The Loretta Young Show	"The Clara Schumann Story"	Robert Florey	NBC
1955	The United States Steel Hour	"The Interview"	Alex Segal	ABC
1955	Waterfront	"Christmas in San Pedro"	Ted Post	Syndicated
1955	Your Hit Parade		Clark Jones	NBC
1956	Best Director - Film Series			
1956	The Phil Silvers Show		Nat Hiken	CBS
1956	Alfred Hitchcock Presents	"The Case of Mr. Pelham"	Alfred Hitchcock	CBS
1956	The Bob Cummings Show	"Return of the Wolf"	Rod Amateau	CBS
1956	Dragnet		Jack Webb	NBC
1956	Make Room for Daddy		Sheldon Leonard	ABC
1956	You Are There	"Grant & Lee at Appomattox"	Bernard Girard	CBS
1956	Best Director - Live Series			
1956	Ford Star Jubilee	"The Caine Mutiny Court-Martial" (Note: Nominated for Best Single Program of the Year)	Franklin J. Schaffner	CBS
1956	Climax!	"Portrait in Celluloid"	John Frankenheimer	CBS
1956	Producers' Showcase	"Peter Pan" (Note: Won Best Single Program of the Year)	Clark Jones	NBC
1956	Producers' Showcase	"Our Town"	Delbert Mann	NBC
1956	The United States Steel Hour	"No Time for Sergeants"	Alex Segal	CBS
1957	Best Direction - Half-Hour or Less			
1957	The Danny Thomas Show	"Danny's Comeback"	Sheldon Leonard	ABC
1957	Camera Three	"As I Lay Dying"	Clay Yurdin	CBS
1957	General Electric Theater	"The Road That Led Afar"	Herschel Daugherty	CBS
1957	Tales of the 77th Bengal Lancers	"The Traitor"	George Archainbaud	NBC
1957	You Are There	"First Moscow Purge Trial"	William D. Russell	CBS
1957	Best Direction - One Hour or More			
1957	Playhouse 90	"Requiem for a Heavyweight"	Ralph Nelson	CBS
1957	The Dinah Shore Chevy Show	"October 5, 1956"	Bob Banner	NBC
1957	Kraft Television Theatre	"A Night to Remember"	George Roy Hill	NBC
1957	NBC Opera Theatre	"La Boheme"	Kirk Browning	NBC
1957	Playhouse 90	"Forbidden Area"	John Frankenheimer	CBS
1957	The 20th Century Fox Hour	"Child of the Regiment"	Lewis Allen	CBS
1958	Best Direction - Half-Hour or Less			
1958	Alfred Hitchcock Presents	"The Glass Eye"	Robert Stevens	CBS
1958	The Danny Thomas Show		Sheldon Leonard	ABC & CBS
1958	Father Knows Best		Peter Tewksbury	NBC
1958	The Patrice Munsel Show		Clark Jones	ABC
1958	Your Hit Parade		Bill Hobin	NBC
1958	Best Direction - One Hour or More			
1958	The Dinah Shore Chevy Show		Bob Banner	NBC
1958	Hallmark Hall of Fame	"The Green Pastures"	George Schaefer	NBC
1958	Playhouse 90	"The Comedian"	John Frankenheimer	CBS
1958	Playhouse 90	"Helen Morgan"	George Roy Hill	CBS
1958	Playhouse 90	"The Miracle Worker"	Arthur Penn	CBS
1959	Best Direction of a Single Program of a Dramatic Series Less Than One Hour			
1959	Alcoa-Goodyear Theatre	"Eddie"	Jack Smight	NBC
1959	Alfred Hitchcock Presents	"Lamb to the Slaughter"	Alfred Hitchcock	CBS
1959	General Electric Theater	"Kid at the Stick"	James Neilson	NBC
1959	General Electric Theater	"One is a Wanderer"	Herschel Daugherty	NBC
1959	Peter Gunn	"The Kill"	Blake Edwards	NBC
1959	Best Direction of a Single Dramatic Program – One Hour or Longer			
1959	Hallmark Hall of Fame	"Little Moon of Alban" (Note: Nominated for Most Outstanding Single Program of the Year)	George Schaefer	NBC
1959	Playhouse 90	"Child of Our Time"	George Roy Hill	CBS
1959	Playhouse 90	"A Town Has Turned to Dust"	John Frankenheimer	CBS

=== 1960s ===
Year	Program	Episode	Nominee(s)	Network
Outstanding Directorial Achievement in Drama
1960	The Moon and Sixpence		Robert Mulligan	NBC
1960	Ford Startime	"The Turn of the Screw"	John Frankenheimer	NBC
1960	Westinghouse Desilu Playhouse	"The Untouchables"	Phil Karlson	CBS
1961	Hallmark Hall of Fame	"Macbeth" (Note: Won Program of the Year)	George Schaefer	NBC
1961	NBC Sunday Showcase	"Sacco-Vanzetti Story" (Note: Nominated for Program of the Year)	Sidney Lumet	NBC
1961	Westinghouse Desilu Playhouse	"The Man in the Funny Suit"	Ralph Nelson	CBS
1962	The Defenders		Franklin J. Schaffner	CBS
1962	Alcoa Premiere	"People Need People"	Alex Segal	ABC
1962	Dr. Kildare	"Shining Image"	Buzz Kulik	NBC
1962	Naked City		Arthur Hiller	ABC
1962	Westinghouse Presents	"Come Again to Carthage"	Jack Smight	CBS
1963	The Defenders	"The Madman"	Stuart Rosenberg	CBS
1963	Alcoa Premiere	"The Voice of Charlie Pont"	Robert Ellis Miller	ABC
1963	Ben Casey	"A Cardinal Act of Mercy"	Sydney Pollack	ABC
1963	The DuPont Show of the Week	"Big Deal in Laredo"	Fielder Cook	NBC
1963	Hallmark Hall of Fame	"Invincible Mr. Disraeli"	George Schaefer	NBC
1964	East Side/West Side	"Who Do You Kill?"	Tom Gries	CBS
1964	Bob Hope Presents the Chrysler Theatre	"Something About Lee Wiley"	Sydney Pollack	NBC
1964	The Defenders	"Blacklist"	Stuart Rosenberg	CBS
1964	The Defenders	"Moment of Truth"	Paul Bogart	CBS
1964	Hallmark Hall of Fame	"The Patriots"	George Schaefer	NBC
Outstanding Individual Achievements in Entertainment - Directors
1965	The Defenders	"The 700 Year-Old Gang"	Paul Bogart	CBS
1965	Hallmark Hall of Fame	"The Magnificent Yankee"	George Schaefer	NBC
1965	My Name Is Barbra		Dwight Hemion	CBS
Outstanding Directorial Achievement in Drama
1966	Bob Hope Presents the Chrysler Theatre	"The Game"	Sydney Pollack	NBC
1966	Hallmark Hall of Fame	"Eagle in a Cage" (Note: Nominated for Outstanding Dramatic Program)	George Schaefer	NBC
1966	Hallmark Hall of Fame	"Inherit the Wind"	George Schaefer	NBC
1966	I Spy	"A Cup of Kindness"	Sheldon Leonard	NBC
1967	Death of a Salesman (Note: Won Outstanding Dramatic Program)		Alex Segal	CBS
1967	CBS Playhouse	"The Final War of Olly Winter"	Paul Bogart	CBS
1967	Hallmark Hall of Fame	"Anastasia"	George Schaefer	NBC
1967	Mark Twain Tonight!		Paul Bogart	CBS
1968	CBS Playhouse	"Dear Friends"	Paul Bogart	CBS
1968	CBS Playhouse	"Do Not Go Gentle Into That Good Night"	George Schaefer	CBS
1968	The Crucible		Alex Segal	CBS
1968	Mission: Impossible	"The Killing"	Lee H. Katzin	CBS
1969	CBS Playhouse	"The People Next Door"	David Greene	CBS
1969	CBS Playhouse	"Secrets"	Paul Bogart	CBS
1969	Hallmark Hall of Fame	"Teacher, Teacher"	Fielder Cook	NBC

=== 1970s ===
Year	Program	Episode	Nominee(s)	Network
Outstanding Directorial Achievement in Drama
1970	CBS Playhouse	"Shadow Game"	Paul Bogart	CBS
1970	Hallmark Hall of Fame	"A Storm in Summer"	Buzz Kulik	NBC
1970	NBC World Premiere Movie	My Sweet Charlie	Lamont Johnson	NBC
Outstanding Directorial Achievement in Drama - A Single Program of a Series with Continuing Characters and/or Theme
1971	The Bold Ones: The Senator	"The Day the Lion Died"	Daryl Duke	NBC
1971	The Bold Ones: The Senator	"A Single Blow of a Sword"	John Badham	NBC
1971	Hawaii Five-O	"Over Fifty? Steal!"	Bob Sweeney	CBS
1972	The Bold Ones: The Lawyers	"The Invasion of Kevin Ireland"	Alexander Singer	NBC
1972	Columbo	"Short Fuse"	Edward M. Abroms	NBC
1972	The Man and the City	"Hands of Love"	Daniel Petrie	ABC
1973	Kung Fu	"An Eye for an Eye"	Jerry Thorpe	ABC
1973	Columbo	"The Most Dangerous Match"	Edward M. Abroms	NBC
1973	The Waltons	"The Love Story"	Lee Philips	CBS
Best Directing in Drama - A Single Program of a Series with Continuing Characters and/or Theme
1974	The Blue Knight (Note: Nominated for Outstanding Limited Series)	"Part III"	Robert Butler	NBC
1974	The Waltons	"The Journey"	Harry Harris	CBS
1974	The Waltons	"The Thanksgiving Story"	Philip Leacock	CBS
Outstanding Directing in a Drama Series
1975	Upstairs, Downstairs	"A Sudden Storm"	Bill Bain	PBS
1975	Benjamin Franklin (Note: Won Outstanding Limited Series)	"The Ambassador"	Glenn Jordan	CBS
1975	Kojak	"Cross Your Heart and Hope to Die"	David Friedkin	CBS
1975	Kojak	"I Want to Report a Dream..."	Telly Savalas	CBS
1975	The Streets of San Francisco	"The Mask of Death"	Harry Falk	ABC
1976	Rich Man, Poor Man	"Part I: Chapters 1 & 2"	David Greene	ABC
1976	Beacon Hill	"Pilot"	Fielder Cook	CBS
1976	Jennie: Lady Randolph Churchill	"Part IV"	James Cellan Jones	PBS
1976	Lincoln	"Crossing Fox River"	George Schaefer	NBC
1976	Rich Man, Poor Man	"Part VI: Chapter 8"	Boris Sagal	ABC
1976	Upstairs, Downstairs	"Women Shall Not Weep"	Christopher Hodson	PBS
1977	Roots	"Part I"	David Greene	ABC
1977	The Adams Chronicles	"John Quincy Adams: President"	Fred Coe	PBS
1977	Roots	"Part II"	John Erman	ABC
1977	Roots	"Part III"	Marvin J. Chomsky	ABC
1977	Roots	"Part VI"	Gilbert Moses	ABC
1978	Holocaust		Marvin J. Chomsky	NBC
1978	The Dain Curse		E. W. Swackhamer	CBS
1978	I, Claudius		Herbert Wise	PBS
1978	King		Abby Mann	NBC
1978	Washington: Behind Closed Doors		Gary Nelson	ABC
1979	The White Shadow	"Pilot"	Jackie Cooper	CBS
1979	Lou Grant	"Murder"	Mel Damski	CBS
1979	Lou Grant	"Prisoner"	Gene Reynolds	CBS
1979	Lou Grant	"Schools"	Burt Brinckerhoff	CBS

=== 1980s ===
Year	Program	Episode	Nominee(s)	Network
1980	Lou Grant	"Cop"	Roger Young	CBS
1980	Lou Grant	"Andrew, Part 2"	Peter Levin	CBS
1980	Lou Grant	"Hollywood"	Burt Brinckerhoff	CBS
1980	Lou Grant	"Influence"	Gene Reynolds	CBS
1980	Skag	"Pilot"	Frank Perry	NBC
1981	Hill Street Blues	"Hill Street Station"	Robert Butler	NBC
1981	American Dream	"Pilot"	Mel Damski	ABC
1981	Hill Street Blues	"Jungle Madness"	Corey Allen	NBC
1981	Hill Street Blues	"Up in Arms"	Georg Stanford Brown	NBC
1981	Lou Grant	"Pack"	Burt Brinckerhoff	CBS
1981	Lou Grant	"Strike"	Gene Reynolds	CBS
1982	Fame	"To Soar and Never Falter"	Harry Harris	NBC
1982	Fame	"Musical Bridge"	Robert Scheerer	NBC
1982	Hill Street Blues	"The Second Oldest Profession"	Robert Butler	NBC
1982	Hill Street Blues	"The World According to Freedom"	Jeff Bleckner	NBC
1982	Lou Grant	"Hometown"	Gene Reynolds	CBS
1983	Hill Street Blues	"Life in the Minors"	Jeff Bleckner	NBC
1983	Fame	"And the Winner Is..."	Marc Daniels	NBC
1983	Fame	"Feelings"	Robert Scheerer	NBC
1983	The Mississippi	"Old Hatred Die Hard"	Leo Penn	CBS
1984	Hill Street Blues	"Goodbye, Mr. Scripps"	Corey Allen	NBC
1984	Fame	"Sheer Will"	Robert Scheerer	NBC
1984	Hill Street Blues	"Doris in Wonderland"	Arthur Allan Seidelman	NBC
1984	Hill Street Blues	"Midway to What?"	Thomas Carter	NBC
1985	Cagney & Lacey	"Heat"	Karen Arthur	CBS
1985	Hill Street Blues	"El Capitan"	Georg Stanford Brown	NBC
1985	Hill Street Blues	"The Rise and Fall of Paul the Wall"	Thomas Carter	NBC
1985	Miami Vice	"Cool Runnin'"	Lee H. Katzin	NBC
1985	Miami Vice	"Smuggler's Blues"	Paul Michael Glaser	NBC
1986	Cagney & Lacey	"Parting Shots"	Georg Stanford Brown	CBS
1986	Amazing Stories	"The Mission"	Steven Spielberg	NBC
1986	Hill Street Blues	"Two Easy Pieces"	Gabrielle Beaumont	NBC
1986	Moonlighting	"The Dream Sequence Always Rings Twice"	Peter Werner	ABC
1986	Moonlighting	"My Fair David"	Will Mackenzie	ABC
1987	L.A. Law	"Pilot"	Gregory Hoblit	NBC
1987	Cagney & Lacey	"Turn, Turn, Turn, Part 2"	Sharron Miller	CBS
1987	L.A. Law	"The Venus Butterfly"	Donald Petrie	NBC
1987	Moonlighting	"Atomic Shakespeare"	Will Mackenzie	ABC
1987	Moonlighting	"I Am Curious... Maddie"	Allan Arkush	ABC
1988	St. Elsewhere	"Weigh In, Way Out"	Mark Tinker	NBC
1988	China Beach	"Pilot"	Rod Holcomb	ABC
1988	L.A. Law	"Beauty and Obese"	Sam Weisman	NBC
1988	L.A. Law	"Full Martial Jacket"	Win Phelps	NBC
1988	L.A. Law	"Handroll Express"	Kim Friedman	NBC
1988	L.A. Law	"The Wizard of Odds	Gregory Hoblit	NBC
1989	Tanner '88	"The Boiler Room"	Robert Altman	HBO
1989	L.A. Law	"I'm in the Nude for Love"	Eric Laneuville	NBC
1989	L.A. Law	"To Live and Diet in L.A."	John Pasquin	NBC
1989	Midnight Caller	"Conversations with the Assassin"	Thomas Carter	NBC
1989	thirtysomething	"We'll Meet Again"	Scott Winant	ABC

=== 1990s ===
Year	Program	Episode	Nominee(s)	Network
1990	Equal Justice	"Promises to Keep"	Thomas Carter	ABC
1990	thirtysomething	"The Go-Between"	Scott Winant	ABC
1990	L.A. Law	"The Last Gasp"	Rick Wallace	NBC
1990	L.A. Law	"Noah's Bark"	Win Phelps	NBC
1990	Twin Peaks	"Pilot"	David Lynch	ABC
1991	Equal Justice	"In Confidence"	Thomas Carter	ABC
1991	China Beach	"You, Babe"	Mimi Leder	ABC
1991	Cop Rock	"Pilot"	Gregory Hoblit	ABC
1991	L.A. Law	"God Rest You Murray Gentleman"	Tom Moore	NBC
1992	I'll Fly Away	"All God's Children"	Eric Laneuville	NBC
1992	China Beach	"Rewind"	Mimi Leder	ABC
1992	L.A. Law	"Say Goodnight, Gracie"	Rick Wallace	NBC
1992	Northern Exposure	"Seoul Mates"	Jack Bender	CBS
1992	The Trials of Rosie O'Neill	"Heartbreak Hotel"	Nancy Malone	CBS
1993	Homicide: Life on the Street	"Gone for Goode"	Barry Levinson	NBC
1993	I'll Fly Away	"Until Tomorrow"	Eric Laneuville	NBC
1993	Law & Order	"Conspiracy"	Edwin Sherin	NBC
1993	Sirens	"What We Talk About When We Talk About Love"	Robert Butler	ABC
1993	Sisters	"Crash and Born"	Nancy Malone	NBC
1993	The Young Indiana Jones Chronicles	"Northern Italy, 1918"	Bille August	ABC
1994	NYPD Blue	"Tempest in a C-Cup"	Daniel Sackheim	ABC
1994	Lois & Clark: The New Adventures of Superman	"Pilot"	Robert Butler	ABC
1994	NYPD Blue	"Guns 'N Rosaries"	Michael M. Robin	ABC
1994	NYPD Blue	"Pilot"	Gregory Hoblit	ABC
1994	NYPD Blue	"True Confessions"	Charles Haid	ABC
1995	ER	"Love's Labor Lost"	Mimi Leder	NBC
1995	Chicago Hope	"Life Support"	Lou Antonio	CBS
1995	ER	"Pilot"	Rod Holcomb	NBC
1995	My So-Called Life	"Pilot"	Scott Winant	ABC
1995	NYPD Blue	"Innuendo"	Mark Tinker	ABC
1996	Chicago Hope	"Leave of Absence"	Jeremy Kagan	CBS
1996	ER	"The Healers"	Mimi Leder	NBC
1996	ER	"Hell and High Water"	Christopher Chulack	NBC
1996	Murder One	"Chapter One"	Charles Haid	ABC
1996	NYPD Blue	"Blackboard Jungle"	Mark Tinker	ABC
1997	NYPD Blue	"Where's 'Swaldo?"	Mark Tinker	ABC
1997	ER	"Fear of Flying"	Christopher Chulack	NBC
1997	ER	"Last Call"	Rod Holcomb	NBC
1997	ER	"Union Station"	Tom Moore	NBC
1997	The X-Files	"Musings of a Cigarette Smoking Man"	James Wong	Fox
1998	Brooklyn South	"Pilot"	Mark Tinker	CBS
1998	NYPD Blue	"Lost Israel, Part 2"	Paris Barclay	ABC
1998	Chicago Hope	"Brain Salad Surgery"	Bill D'Elia	CBS
1998	ER	"Ambush"	Thomas Schlamme	NBC
1998	The X-Files	"The Post-Modern Prometheus"	Chris Carter	Fox
1999	NYPD Blue	"Hearts and Souls"	Paris Barclay	ABC
1999	Law & Order	"Empire"	Matthew Penn	NBC
1999	Law & Order/Homicide: Life on the Street	"Sideshow"	Edwin Sherin	NBC
1999	The Sopranos	"The Sopranos"	David Chase	HBO

=== 2000s ===
Year	Program	Episode	Nominee(s)	Network
2000	The West Wing	"Pilot"	Thomas Schlamme	NBC
2000	ER	"All in the Family"	Jonathan Kaplan	NBC
2000	ER	"Such Sweet Sorrow"	John Wells	NBC
2000	The Sopranos	"Funhouse"	John Patterson	HBO
2000	The Sopranos	"The Knight in White Satin Armor"	Allen Coulter	HBO
2001	The West Wing	"In the Shadow of Two Gunmen"	Thomas Schlamme	NBC
2001	ER	"The Visit"	Jonathan Kaplan	NBC
2001	The Sopranos	"Amour Fou"	Tim Van Patten	HBO
2001	The Sopranos	"Pine Barrens"	Steve Buscemi	HBO
2001	The Sopranos	"University"	Allen Coulter	HBO
2001	The West Wing	"Shibboleth"	Laura Innes	NBC
2002	Six Feet Under	"Pilot"	Alan Ball	HBO
2002	The Shield	"Pilot"	Clark Johnson	FX
2002	24	"12:00 a.m. – 1:00 a.m."	Stephen Hopkins	Fox
2002	The West Wing	"The Indians in the Lobby"	Paris Barclay	NBC
2002	The West Wing	"Posse Comitatus"	Alex Graves	NBC
2003	The West Wing	"Twenty Five"	Christopher Misiano	NBC
2003	Six Feet Under	"Nobody Sleeps"	Alan Poul	HBO
2003	The Sopranos	"Whitecaps"	John Patterson	HBO
2003	The Sopranos	"Whoever Did This"	Tim Van Patten	HBO
2003	24	"Day 2: 10:00 p.m. – 11:00 p.m."	Ian Toynton	Fox
2004	Deadwood	"Deadwood"	Walter Hill	HBO
2004	ER	"The Lost"	Christopher Chulack	NBC
2004	Nip/Tuck	"Pilot"	Ryan Murphy	FX
2004	The Sopranos	"Irregular Around the Margins"	Allen Coulter	HBO
2004	The Sopranos	"Long Term Parking"	Tim Van Patten	HBO
2005	Lost	"Pilot"	J. J. Abrams	ABC
2005	CSI: Crime Scene Investigation	"Grave Danger"	Quentin Tarantino	CBS
2005	Deadwood	"Complications"	Gregg Fienberg	HBO
2005	Grey's Anatomy	"A Hard Day's Night"	Peter Horton	ABC
2005	Huff	"Crazy Nuts & All Fucked Up"	Scott Winant	Showtime
2005	Rescue Me	"Guts"	Peter Tolan	FX
2005	The West Wing	"2162 Votes"	Alex Graves	NBC
2006	24	"Day 5: 7:00 a.m. – 8:00 a.m."	Jon Cassar	Fox
2006	Big Love	"Pilot"	Rodrigo Garcia	HBO
2006	Lost	"Live Together, Die Alone"	Jack Bender	ABC
2006	Six Feet Under	"Everyone's Waiting"	Alan Ball	HBO
2006	The Sopranos	"Join the Club"	David Nutter	HBO
2006	The Sopranos	"Members Only"	Tim Van Patten	HBO
2006	The West Wing	"Election Day, Part 1"	Mimi Leder	NBC
2007	The Sopranos	"Kennedy and Heidi"	Alan Taylor	HBO
2007	Battlestar Galactica	"Exodus, Part 2"	Félix Enríquez Alcalá	Sci Fi
2007	Boston Legal	"Son of the Defender"	Bill D'Elia	ABC
2007	Friday Night Lights	"Pilot"	Peter Berg	NBC
2007	Heroes	"Genesis"	David Semel	NBC
2007	Lost	"Through the Looking Glass"	Jack Bender	ABC
2007	Studio 60 on the Sunset Strip	"Pilot"	Thomas Schlamme	NBC
2008	House	"House's Head"	Greg Yaitanes	Fox
2008	Boston Legal	"The Mighty Rogues"	Arlene Sanford	ABC
2008	Breaking Bad	"Pilot"	Vince Gilligan	AMC
2008	Damages	"Get Me a Lawyer"	Allen Coulter	FX
2008	Mad Men	"Smoke Gets in Your Eyes"	Alan Taylor	AMC
2009	ER	"And in the End..."	Rod Holcomb	NBC
2009	Battlestar Galactica	"Daybreak, Part 2"	Michael Rymer	Sci Fi
2009	Boston Legal	"Made in China" & "Last Call"	Bill D'Elia	ABC
2009	Damages	"Trust Me"	Todd A. Kessler	FX
2009	Mad Men	"The Jet Set"	Phil Abraham	AMC

=== 2010s ===
Year	Program	Episode	Nominee(s)	Network
2010	Dexter	"The Getaway"	Steve Shill	Showtime
2010	Breaking Bad	"One Minute"	Michelle MacLaren	AMC
2010	Lost	"The End"	Jack Bender	ABC
2010	Mad Men	"Guy Walks Into an Advertising Agency"	Lesli Linka Glatter	AMC
2010	Treme	"Do You Know What It Means"	Agnieszka Holland	HBO
2011	Boardwalk Empire	"Boardwalk Empire"	Martin Scorsese	HBO
2011	Boardwalk Empire	"Anastasia"	Jeremy Podeswa	HBO
2011	The Borgias	"The Poisoned Chalice" & "The Assassin"	Neil Jordan	Showtime
2011	Game of Thrones	"Winter Is Coming"	Tim Van Patten	HBO
2011	The Killing	"Pilot"	Patty Jenkins	AMC
2012	Boardwalk Empire	"To the Lost"	Tim Van Patten	HBO
2012	Breaking Bad	"Face Off"	Vince Gilligan	AMC
2012	Downton Abbey	"Episode 207"	Brian Percival	PBS
2012	Homeland	"Pilot"	Michael Cuesta	Showtime
2012	Mad Men	"The Other Woman"	Phil Abraham	AMC
2013	House of Cards	"Chapter 1"	David Fincher	Netflix
2013	Boardwalk Empire	"Margate Sands"	Tim Van Patten	HBO
2013	Breaking Bad	"Gliding Over All"	Michelle MacLaren	AMC
2013	Downton Abbey	"Episode 304"	Jeremy Webb	PBS
2013	Homeland	"Q&A"	Lesli Linka Glatter	Showtime
2014	True Detective	"Who Goes There"	Cary Joji Fukunaga	HBO
2014	Boardwalk Empire	"Farewell Daddy Blues"	Tim Van Patten	HBO
2014	Breaking Bad	"Felina"	Vince Gilligan	AMC
2014	Downton Abbey	"Episode 401"	David Evans	PBS
2014	Game of Thrones	"The Watchers on the Wall"	Neil Marshall	HBO
2014	House of Cards	"Chapter 14"	Carl Franklin	Netflix
2015	Game of Thrones	"Mother's Mercy"	David Nutter	HBO
2015	Boardwalk Empire	"Eldorado"	Tim Van Patten	HBO
2015	Game of Thrones	"Unbowed, Unbent, Unbroken"	Jeremy Podeswa	HBO
2015	Homeland	"From A to B and Back Again"	Lesli Linka Glatter	Showtime
2015	The Knick	"Method and Madness"	Steven Soderbergh	Cinemax
2016
2016	Game of Thrones	"Battle of the Bastards"	Miguel Sapochnik	HBO
2016	Downton Abbey	"Episode 609"	Michael Engler	PBS
2016	Game of Thrones	"The Door"	Jack Bender	HBO
2016	Homeland	"The Tradition of Hospitality"	Lesli Linka Glatter	Showtime
2016	The Knick	"This Is All We Are"	Steven Soderbergh	Cinemax
2016	Ray Donovan	"Exsuscito"	David Hollander	Showtime
2017
2017	The Handmaid's Tale	"Offred"	Reed Morano	Hulu
2017	Better Call Saul	"Witness"	Vince Gilligan	AMC
2017	The Crown	"Hyde Park Corner"	Stephen Daldry	Netflix
2017	The Handmaid's Tale	"The Bridge"	Kate Dennis	Hulu
2017	Homeland	"America First"	Lesli Linka Glatter	Showtime
2017	Stranger Things	"Chapter One: The Vanishing of Will Byers"	The Duffer Brothers	Netflix
2017	Westworld	"The Bicameral Mind"	Jonathan Nolan	HBO
2018
2018	The Crown	"Paterfamilias"	Stephen Daldry	Netflix
2018	Game of Thrones	"Beyond the Wall"	Alan Taylor	HBO
2018	Game of Thrones	"The Dragon and the Wolf"	Jeremy Podeswa	HBO
2018	The Handmaid's Tale	"After"	Kari Skogland	Hulu
2018	Ozark	"The Toll"	Jason Bateman	Netflix
2018	Ozark	"Tonight We Improvise"	Daniel Sackheim	Netflix
2018	Stranger Things	"Chapter Nine: The Gate"	The Duffer Brothers	Netflix
2019
2019	Ozark	"Reparations"	Jason Bateman	Netflix
2019	Game of Thrones	"The Iron Throne"	David Benioff and D. B. Weiss	HBO
2019	Game of Thrones	"The Last of the Starks"	David Nutter	HBO
2019	Game of Thrones	"The Long Night"	Miguel Sapochnik	HBO
2019	The Handmaid's Tale	"Holly"	Daina Reid	Hulu
2019	Killing Eve	"Desperate Times"	Lisa Brühlmann	BBC America
2019	Succession	"Celebration"	Adam McKay	HBO

=== 2020s ===
Year	Program	Episode	Nominee(s)	Network
2020
2020	Succession	"Hunting"	Andrij Parekh	HBO
2020	The Crown	"Aberfan"	Benjamin Caron	Netflix
2020	The Crown	"Cri de Coeur"	Jessica Hobbs	Netflix
2020	Homeland	"Prisoners of War"	Lesli Linka Glatter	Showtime
2020	The Morning Show	"The Interview"	Mimi Leder	Apple TV+
2020	Ozark	"Fire Pink"	Alik Sakharov	Netflix
2020	Ozark	"Su Casa Es Mi Casa"	Ben Semanoff	Netflix
2020	Succession	"This Is Not for Tears"	Mark Mylod	HBO
2021
2021	The Crown	"War"	Jessica Hobbs	Netflix
2021	Bridgerton	"Diamond of the First Water"	Julie Anne Robinson	Netflix
2021	The Crown	"Fairytale"	Benjamin Caron	Netflix
2021	The Handmaid's Tale	"The Wilderness"	Liz Garbus	Hulu
2021	The Mandalorian	"Chapter 9: The Marshal"	Jon Favreau	Disney+
2021	Pose	"Series Finale"	Steven Canals	FX
2022 (74th)
2022 (74th)	Squid Game	"Red Light, Green Light"	Hwang Dong-hyuk	Netflix
2022 (74th)	Ozark	"A Hard Way to Go"	Jason Bateman	Netflix
2022 (74th)	Severance	"The We We Are"	Ben Stiller	Apple TV+
2022 (74th)	Succession	"All the Bells Say"	Mark Mylod	HBO
2022 (74th)	Succession	"The Disruption"	Cathy Yan	HBO
2022 (74th)	Succession	"Too Much Birthday"	Lorene Scafaria	HBO
2022 (74th)	Yellowjackets	"Pilot"	Karyn Kusama	Showtime
2023 (75th)
2023 (75th)	Succession	"Connor's Wedding"	Mark Mylod	HBO
2023 (75th)	Andor	"Rix Road"	Benjamin Caron	Disney+
2023 (75th)	Bad Sisters	"The Prick"	Dearbhla Walsh	Apple TV+
2023 (75th)	The Last of Us	"Long, Long Time"	Peter Hoar	HBO
2023 (75th)	Succession	"America Decides"	Andrij Parekh	HBO
2023 (75th)	Succession	"Living+"	Lorene Scafaria	HBO
2023 (75th)	The White Lotus	"Arrivederci"	Mike White	HBO
2024 (76th)
2024 (76th)	Shōgun	"Crimson Sky"	Frederick E. O. Toye	FX
2024 (76th)	The Crown	"Sleep, Dearie Sleep"	Stephen Daldry	Netflix
2024 (76th)	The Morning Show	"The Overview Effect"	Mimi Leder	Apple TV+
2024 (76th)	Mr. & Mrs. Smith	"First Date"	Hiro Murai	Prime Video
2024 (76th)	Slow Horses	"Strange Games"	Saul Metzstein	Apple TV+
2024 (76th)	Winning Time: The Rise of the Lakers Dynasty	"BEAT L.A."	Salli Richardson-Whitfield	HBO
2025 (77th)
2025 (77th)	Slow Horses	"Hello Goodbye"	Adam Randall	Apple TV+
2025 (77th)	Andor	"Who Are You?"	Janus Metz	Disney+
2025 (77th)	The Pitt	"6:00 P.M."	Amanda Marsalis	HBO Max
2025 (77th)	The Pitt	"7:00 A.M."	John Wells	HBO Max
2025 (77th)	Severance	"Chikhai Bardo"	Jessica Lee Gagné	Apple TV+
2025 (77th)	Severance	"Cold Harbor"	Ben Stiller	Apple TV+
2025 (77th)	The White Lotus	"Amor Fati"	Mike White	HBO
2026 (78th)
2026 (78th)	Slow Horses	"Scars"	Saul Metzstein	Apple TV
2026 (78th)	The Gilded Age	"My Mind Is Made Up"	Salli Richardson-Whitfield	HBO
2026 (78th)	Paradise	"Exodus"	Hanelle Culpepper	Hulu
2026 (78th)	The Pitt	"12:00 P.M."	Noah Wyle	HBO Max
2026 (78th)	Pluribus	"We Is Us"	Vince Gilligan	Apple TV
2026 (78th)	Task	"Out beyond ideas of wrongdoing and rightdoing, there is a river."	Salli Richardson-Whitfield	HBO

== Total awards by network ==
- NBC – 21
- CBS – 17
- ABC – 11
- HBO – 10
- Netflix – 5
- Apple TV - 2
- Fox – 2
- Hulu – 1
- PBS – 1
- Showtime – 1

== Programs with multiple awards ==
4 awards

- NYPD Blue (3 consecutive)

3 awards

- CBS Playhouse (consecutive)
- The Defenders (2 consecutive)
- Hill Street Blues (2 consecutive)
- The West Wing (2 consecutive)

2 awards

- Boardwalk Empire (consecutive)
- The Crown
- Cagney & Lacey (consecutive)
- Equal Justice (consecutive)
- ER
- Game of Thrones (consecutive)
- Hallmark Hall of Fame
- Slow Horses (consecutive)
- Succession

== Programs with multiple nominations ==
13 nominations

- ER (NBC)
- The Sopranos (HBO)

12 nominations

- Hill Street Blues (NBC)
- L.A. Law (NBC)

11 nominations

- Game of Thrones (HBO)
- Hallmark Hall of Fame (NBC)

10 nominations

- Lou Grant (CBS)

9 nominations

- NYPD Blue (ABC)
- Succession (HBO)

8 nominations

- The West Wing (NBC)

7 nominations

- The Crown (Netflix)
- Playhouse 90 (CBS)

6 nominations

- Boardwalk Empire (HBO)
- CBS Playhouse (CBS)
- Homeland (Showtime)
- Ozark (Netflix)

5 nominations

- Breaking Bad (AMC)
- The Defenders (CBS)
- Fame (NBC)
- The Handmaid's Tale (Hulu)

4 nominations

- Downton Abbey (PBS)
- Lost (ABC)
- Mad Men (AMC)
- Moonlighting (ABC)
- Roots (ABC)

3 nominations

- 24 (Fox)
- Boston Legal (ABC)
- Cagney & Lacey (CBS)
- Chicago Hope (CBS)
- China Beach (ABC)
- General Electric Theatre (NBC)
- Law & Order (NBC)
- The Pitt (HBO Max)
- Severance (Apple TV+)
- Six Feet Under (HBO)
- Slow Horses (Apple TV+)
- The Waltons (CBS)

2 nominations

- Alcoa Premiere (ABC)
- Alfred Hitchcock Presents (CBS)
- Andor (Disney+)
- Battlestar Galactica (Syfy)
- Bob Hope Presents the Chrysler Theatre (NBC)
- The Bold Ones: The Senator (NBC)
- Columbo (NBC)
- Damages (FX)
- Deadwood (HBO)
- The Dinah Shore Chevy Show (NBC)
- Equal Justice (ABC)
- Homicide: Life on the Street (NBC)
- House of Cards (Netflix)
- I'll Fly Away (NBC)
- The Knick (Cinemax)
- Kojak (CBS)
- Miami Vice (NBC)
- The Morning Show (Apple TV+)
- Producers' Showcase (NBC)
- Rich Man, Poor Man (PBS)
- Sirens (ABC)
- Stranger Things (Netflix)
- thirtysomething (ABC)
- The United States Steel Hour (ABC)
- Upstairs, Downstairs (PBS)
- Westinghouse Desilu Playhouse (CBS)
- The White Lotus (HBO)
- The X-Files (Fox)

== Individuals with multiple awards ==
3 awards

- Paul Bogart
- David Greene (2 consecutive)
- Mark Tinker (2 consecutive)

2 awards

- Paris Barclay (consecutive)
- Robert Butler
- Thomas Carter (consecutive)
- George Schaefer
- Franklin J. Schaffner (consecutive)
- Thomas Schlamme (consecutive)

== Individuals with multiple nominations ==
10 nominations

- George Schaefer

9 nominations

- Tim Van Patten

7 nominations

- Paul Bogart
- Mimi Leder

6 nominations

- Lesli Linka Glatter

5 nominations

- Jack Bender
- Robert Butler
- Thomas Carter
- John Frankenheimer
- Vince Gilligan
- Alex Segal
- Mark Tinker

4 nominations

- Allen Coulter
- Gregory Hoblit
- Rod Holcomb
- Gene Reynolds
- Thomas Schlamme
- Scott Winant

3 nominations

- Paris Barclay
- Jason Bateman
- Burt Brinckerhoff
- Georg Stanford Brown
- Benjamin Caron
- Christopher Chulack
- Fielder Cook
- Stephen Daldry
- Bill D'Elia
- David Greene
- George Roy Hill
- Eric Laneuville
- Mark Mylod
- David Nutter
- Sydney Pollack
- Jeremy Podeswa
- Salli Richardson-Whitfield
- Franklin J. Schaffner
- Robert Scheerer
- Alan Taylor

2 nominations

- Phil Abraham
- Edward M. Abroms
- Corey Allen
- Alan Ball
- Bob Banner
- Jeff Bleckner
- Benjamin Caron
- Marvin J. Chomsky
- Mel Damski
- The Duffer Brothers
- Alex Graves
- Charles Haid
- Harry Harris
- Jessica Hobbs
- Clark Jones
- Jonathan Kaplan
- Lee H. Katzin
- Buzz Kulik
- Will Mackenzie
- Michelle MacLaren
- Nancy Malone
- Saul Metzstein
- Tom Moore
- Ralph Nelson
- Andrij Parekh
- John Patterson
- Win Phelps
- Stuart Rosenberg
- Daniel Sackheim
- Miguel Sapochnik
- Lorene Scafaria
- Edwin Sherin
- Jack Smight
- Steven Soderbergh
- Ben Stiller
- Rick Wallace
- John Wells
- Mike White

== See also ==
- Primetime Emmy Award for Outstanding Directing for a Comedy Series
