= 21st Directors Guild of America Awards =

- Date: February 22, 1969
- Location: The Beverly Hilton, Beverly Hills, California
- Country: United States
- Presented by: Directors Guild of America
- Hosted by: Carl Reiner

Highlights
- Best Director Feature Film: The Lion in Winter – Anthony Harvey
- Best Director Television: CBS Playhouse for "My Father and My Mother" – George Schaefer
- Website: https://www.dga.org/Awards/History/1960s/1968.aspx?value=1968

The 21st Directors Guild of America Awards, honoring the outstanding directorial achievements in film and television in 1968, were presented on February 22, 1969, at the Beverly Hilton in Beverly Hills, California. The ceremony was hosted by Carl Reiner. The feature film nominees were announced in January 1969.

== Winners and nominees ==
=== Film ===
Feature Film

Anthony Harvey – The Lion in Winter

- Paul Almond – Isabel
- Stanley Kubrick – 2001: A Space Odyssey
- Jiří Menzel – Closely Watched Trains
- Paul Newman – Rachel, Rachel
- Roman Polanski – Rosemary's Baby
- Carol Reed – Oliver!
- Gene Saks – The Odd Couple
- William Wyler – Funny Girl
- Franco Zeffirelli – Romeo and Juliet

=== Television ===
Television

George Schaefer – CBS Playhouse for "My Father and My Mother"

- Paul Bogart – CBS Playhouse for "Secrets"
- Roger Englander – Vladimir Horowitz: A TV Concert at Carnegie Hall
- John Florea – Mission: Impossible for "The Elixir"
- David Greene – CBS Playhouse for "The People Next Door"
- Robert Henry – Mitzi
- Lee H. Katzin – The Mod Squad for "Pilot"
- Delbert Mann – Heidi
- Robert Scheerer – Here's Peggy Fleming
- Gordon Wiles – Rowan & Martin's Laugh-In
