= 20th Primetime Emmy Awards =

1968 American television programming awards

- Date: May 19, 1968
- Location: Hollywood Palladium, Los Angeles, California
- Presented by: Academy of Television Arts and Sciences
- Hosted by: Frank Sinatra; Dick Van Dyke

Highlights
- Most awards: Get Smart (3)
- Most nominations: Bewitched; Dear Friends; Do Not Go Gentle Into That Good Night; He & She; Mission: Impossible (5)
- Outstanding Comedy Series: Get Smart
- Outstanding Dramatic Series: Mission: Impossible
- Outstanding Dramatic Program: Hallmark Hall of Fame: "Elizabeth the Queen"
- Outstanding Musical or Variety Series: Rowan & Martin's Laugh-In

Television/radio coverage
- Network: NBC

The 20th Emmy Awards, later known as the 20th Primetime Emmy Awards, were handed out on May 19, 1968. The ceremony was hosted by Frank Sinatra and Dick Van Dyke. 24 awards were presented. Winners are listed in bold and series' networks are in parentheses.

The top shows of the night were Get Smart and Mission: Impossible. Get Smart won three major awards, while the most nominated show was the anthology drama CBS Playhouse with ten. It also won three major awards.

The first posthumous Acting Emmy went to Marion Lorne for her performance in Bewitched, while The Avengers was the first non American produced nomination, having been syndicated from ABC Weekend TV, which was a part of the United Kingdom Independent Television Network, by ABC. However, other than sharing the same initials, the two companies were independent of each other.

== Winners and nominees ==
=== Programs ===
Programs
**Outstanding Comedy Series**: **Get Smart (NBC)**; Bewitched (ABC); Family Affair (CBS); Hogan's Heroes (CBS); The Lucy Show (CBS)	**Outstanding Dramatic Series**: **Mission: Impossible (CBS)**; The Avengers (ABC); I Spy (NBC); NET Playhouse (NET); Run for Your Life (NBC); Star Trek (NBC)
**Outstanding Musical or Variety Series**: **Rowan & Martin's Laugh-In (NBC)**; The Bell Telephone Hour (NBC); The Carol Burnett Show (CBS); The Dean Martin Comedy Hour (NBC); The Smothers Brothers Comedy Hour (CBS)	**Outstanding Musical or Variety Program**: **Rowan & Martin's Laugh-In (NBC): "Pilot"**; Chrysler Presents The Bob Hope Show (NBC); The Fred Astaire Show (NBC); Herb Alpert and the Tijuana Brass (CBS); Lincoln Center/Stage 5 (Syndicated); A Man and His Music + Ella + Jobim (NBC)
**Outstanding Achievement in Daytime Programming - Programs**: **Today (NBC)**; Camera Three (CBS); The Mike Douglas Show (Syndicated)	**Outstanding Achievement in Sports Programming - Programs**: **ABC's Wide World of Sports (ABC) – Roone Arledge**; **ABC's Wide World of Sports (ABC) – Jim McKay**; 10th Winter Olympic Games (ABC) – Roone Arledge; 10th Winter Olympic Games (ABC) – Dick Button; The American Sportsman (ABC); The Flying Fisherman (Syndicated); NCAA Football (ABC)
**Outstanding Achievement in Children's Programming** (Note: Although nominees were announced for Outstanding Achievement in Children's Programming, no award was given. Contemporary coverage in Variety reported that "no awards were given in musical composition and child program categories."): **No award given**; He's Your Dog, Charlie Brown (CBS); Mister Rogers' Neighborhood (NET); You're in Love, Charlie Brown (CBS)
**Outstanding Dramatic Program**: **Hallmark Hall of Fame (NBC): "Elizabeth the Queen"**; CBS Playhouse (CBS): "Dear Friends"; CBS Playhouse (CBS): "Do Not Go Gentle Into That Good Night"; NET Playhouse (NET): "Uncle Vanya"; The Strange Case of Dr. Jekyll and Mr. Hyde (ABC); Xerox Special (ABC): "Luther"

=== Acting ===
==== Lead performances ====
Acting
**Outstanding Continued Performance** **by an Actor in a Leading Role in a Comedy Series**: **Don Adams as Maxwell Smart in Get Smart (NBC)**; Richard Benjamin as Dick Hollister in He & She (CBS); Sebastian Cabot as Mr. Giles French in Family Affair (CBS); Brian Keith as Uncle Bill Davis in Family Affair (CBS); Dick York as Darrin Stephens in Bewitched (ABC)	**Outstanding Continued Performance** **by an Actress in a Leading Role in a Comedy Series**: **Lucille Ball as Lucy Carmichael in The Lucy Show (CBS)**; Barbara Feldon as Agent 99 in Get Smart (NBC); Elizabeth Montgomery as Samantha Stephens in Bewitched (ABC); Paula Prentiss as Paula Hollister in He & She (CBS); Marlo Thomas as Ann Marie in That Girl (ABC)
**Outstanding Continued Performance** **by an Actor in a Leading Role in a Dramatic Series**: **Bill Cosby as Alexander Scott in I Spy (NBC)**; Raymond Burr as Robert T. Ironside in Ironside (NBC); Robert Culp as Kelly Robinson in I Spy (NBC); Ben Gazzara as Paul Bryan in Run for Your Life (NBC); Martin Landau as Rollin Hand in Mission: Impossible (CBS)	**Outstanding Continued Performance** **by an Actress in a Leading Role in a Dramatic Series**: **Barbara Bain as Cinnamon Carter in Mission: Impossible (CBS)**; Diana Rigg as Emma Peel in The Avengers (ABC); Barbara Stanwyck as Victoria Barkley in The Big Valley (ABC)

==== Supporting performances ====
**Outstanding Performance by an Actor in a Supporting Role in a Comedy**: **Werner Klemperer as Col. Wilhelm Klink in Hogan's Heroes (CBS)**; Jack Cassidy as Oscar North in He & She (CBS); William Demarest as Uncle Charley O'Casey in My Three Sons (CBS); Gale Gordon as Mr. Theodore J. Mooney in The Lucy Show (CBS)	**Outstanding Performance by an Actress in a Supporting Role in a Comedy**: **Marion Lorne as Aunt Clara in Bewitched (ABC)**; Agnes Moorehead as Endora in Bewitched (ABC); Marge Redmond as Sister Jacqueline in The Flying Nun (ABC); Nita Talbot as Marya in Hogan's Heroes (CBS) (Episode: "The Hostage")
**Outstanding Performance by an Actor in a Supporting Role in a Drama**: **Milburn Stone as Doc in Gunsmoke (CBS) (Episode: "Baker's Dozen")**; Joseph Campanella as Lew Wickersham in Mannix (CBS); Lawrence Dobkin as Dr. Gettlinger in CBS Playhouse (CBS) (Episode: "Do Not Go Gentle Into That Good Night"); Leonard Nimoy as Mr. Spock in Star Trek (NBC)	**Outstanding Performance by an Actress in a Supporting Role in a Drama**: **Barbara Anderson as Officer Eve Whitfield in Ironside (NBC)**; Linda Cristal as Victoria Cannon in The High Chaparral (NBC); Tessie O'Shea as Tessie O'Toole in The Strange Case of Dr. Jekyll and Mr. Hyde (ABC)

==== Single performances ====
**Outstanding Single Performance by an Actor in a Leading Role in a Drama**: **Melvyn Douglas as Peter Schermann in CBS Playhouse (CBS): "Do Not Go Gentle Into That Good Night"**; Raymond Burr as Robert T. Ironside in NBC World Premiere Movie (NBC): "Ironside"; Van Heflin as Robert Sloane in A Case of Libel (ABC); George C. Scott as John Proctor in The Crucible (CBS); Eli Wallach as Douglas Lambert in CBS Playhouse (CBS): "Dear Friends"	**Outstanding Single Performance by an Actress in a Leading Role in a Drama**: **Maureen Stapleton as Mary O'Meaghan in Among the Paths to Eden (ABC)**; Judith Anderson as Queen Elizabeth I in Hallmark Hall of Fame (NBC): "Elizabeth the Queen"; Geneviève Bujold as Joan of Arc in Hallmark Hall of Fame (NBC): "Saint Joan"; Colleen Dewhurst as Elizabeth Proctor in The Crucible (CBS); Anne Jackson as Vivian Spears in CBS Playhouse (CBS): "Dear Friends"

=== Directing ===
Directing
**Outstanding Directorial Achievement in Comedy**: **Get Smart (NBC): "Maxwell Smart, Private Eye" – Bruce Bilson**; The Monkees (NBC): "The Devil and Peter Tork" – James Frawley; That Girl (ABC): "That Girl" – Danny Arnold	**Outstanding Directorial Achievement in Drama**: **CBS Playhouse (CBS): "Dear Friends" – Paul Bogart**; CBS Playhouse (CBS): "Do Not Go Gentle Into That Good Night" – George Schaefer; The Crucible (CBS) – Alex Segal; Mission: Impossible (CBS): "The Killing" – Lee H. Katzin
**Outstanding Directorial Achievement in Music or Variety**: **Movin' with Nancy (NBC) – Jack Haley Jr.**; The Dean Martin Comedy Hour (NBC) – Greg Garrison; Herb Alpert and the Tijuana Brass (CBS) – Dwight Hemion; Rowan & Martin's Laugh-In (NBC) – Gordon Wiles; Rowan & Martin's Laugh-In (NBC): "Pilot" – Bill Foster

=== Writing ===
Writing
**Outstanding Writing Achievement in Comedy**: **He & She (CBS): "The Coming Out Party" – Chris Hayward and Allan Burns**; He & She (CBS): "The Old Man and the She" – Leonard Stern and Arne Sultan; The Lucy Show (CBS): "Lucy Gets Jack Benny's Account" – Milt Josefsberg and Ray Singer; That Girl (ABC): "The Mailman Cometh" – Danny Arnold and Ruth Brooks Flippen	**Outstanding Writing Achievement in Drama**: **CBS Playhouse (CBS): "Do Not Go Gentle Into That Good Night" – Loring Mandel**; CBS Playhouse (CBS): "Dear Friends" – Reginald Rose; Mission: Impossible (CBS): "The Seal" – William Read Woodfield and Allan Balter; NBC World Premiere Movie (NBC): "Ironside" – Don Mankiewicz
**Outstanding Writing Achievement in Music or Variety**: **Rowan & Martin's Laugh-In** (NBC); The Carol Burnett Show (CBS); Rowan & Martin's Laugh-In: "Pilot" (NBC); The Smothers Brothers Comedy Hour (CBS): "Ronnie Schell, Kate Smith and Simon & Garfunkel"

== Most major nominations ==
Networks with multiple major nominations (Note: "Major" constitutes the categories listed above: Program, Acting, Directing, and Writing. Does not include the technical categories.)
Network	Number of Nominations
CBS	43
NBC	30
ABC	20

Programs with multiple major nominations
Program	Category	Network	Number of Nominations
Bewitched	Comedy	ABC	5
Dear Friends	Special	CBS	5
Do Not Go Gentle Into That Good Night	Special	CBS	5
He & She	Comedy	CBS	5
Mission: Impossible	Drama	CBS	5
Get Smart	Comedy	NBC	4
Ironside	Drama	NBC	4
The Lucy Show	Comedy	CBS	4
The Crucible	Special	CBS	3
Family Affair	Comedy	CBS	3
Hogan's Heroes	Comedy	CBS	3
I Spy	Drama	NBC	3
Rowan & Martin's Laugh-In	Variety	NBC	3
That Girl	Comedy	ABC	3
10th Winter Olympic Games	Sports	ABC	2
The Avengers	Drama	ABC	2
The Carol Burnett Show	Variety	CBS	2
The Dean Martin Comedy Hour	Variety	NBC	2
Elizabeth the Queen	Special	NBC	2
Herb Alpert and the Tijuana Brass	Variety	CBS	2
NET Playhouse	Drama	NET	2
Run for Your Life	Drama	NBC	2
The Smothers Brothers Comedy Hour	Variety	CBS	2
Star Trek	Drama	NBC	2
The Strange Case of Dr. Jekyll and Mr. Hyde	Special	ABC	2
Wide World of Sports	Sports	ABC	2

== Most major awards ==
Networks with multiple major awards
Network	Number of Awards
NBC	10
CBS	9
ABC	3

Programs with multiple major awards
Program	Category	Network	Number of Awards
Get Smart	Comedy	NBC	3
Do Not Go Gentle Into That Good Night	Special	CBS	2
Mission: Impossible	Drama	CBS	2
Rowan & Martin's Laugh-In	Variety	NBC	2
Wide World of Sports	Sports	ABC	2
