= 21st Primetime Emmy Awards =

1969 American television programming awards

21st Emmy Awards
- Date: June 8, 1969
- Location: Santa Monica Civic Auditorium, Santa Monica, California
- Presented by: Academy of Television Arts and Sciences
- Hosted by: Bill Cosby; Merv Griffin

Highlights
- Most awards: 1968 Summer Olympics; Get Smart; Male of the Species; The People Next Door (2)
- Most nominations: Hallmark Hall of Fame: "Teacher, Teacher"; Mission: Impossible (6)
- Outstanding Comedy Series: Get Smart
- Outstanding Dramatic Series: NET Playhouse
- Outstanding Dramatic Program: Hallmark Hall of Fame: "Teacher, Teacher"
- Outstanding Variety or Music Series: Rowan & Martin's Laugh-In

Television/radio coverage
- Network: CBS

The 21st Emmy Awards—also known since 1974 as the 21st Primetime Emmy Awards—were handed out on June 8, 1969. The ceremony was co-hosted by Bill Cosby and Merv Griffin. 21 awards were presented.

The top shows of the night were Get Smart, which won Outstanding Comedy Series for the second consecutive year, and Outstanding Dramatic Series winner NET Playhouse. NET Playhouse, from the PBS predecessor National Educational Television Network, became the first show outside the Big Three television networks to win a top series award.

Due to several categories being combined for the ceremony, no show received more than two major wins. The most drastic rule change was that all shows that had aired more than two seasons were ineligible. The cause of this change was due to the rise in repeat winners in recent years. There was no winner in the category of Outstanding Single Performance by an Actor in a Supporting Role, because the judges felt that none of the nominees were worthy of an award.

== Winners and nominees ==
Winners are listed in bold and series' networks are in parentheses.

=== Programs ===
Programs
**Outstanding Comedy Series**: **Get Smart (NBC)**; Bewitched (ABC); Family Affair (CBS); The Ghost & Mrs. Muir (NBC); Julia (NBC)	**Outstanding Dramatic Series**: **NET Playhouse (NET)**; The F.B.I. (ABC); Ironside (NBC); Judd, for the Defense (ABC); Mission: Impossible (CBS); The Name of the Game (NBC)
**Outstanding Variety or Musical Series**: **Rowan & Martin's Laugh-In (NBC)**; The Carol Burnett Show (CBS); The Dean Martin Show (NBC); The Smothers Brothers Comedy Hour (CBS); That's Life (ABC)	**Outstanding Variety or Music Program**: **The Bill Cosby Special (CBS)**; Barbra Streisand: A Happening in Central Park (CBS); Duke Ellington Concert of Sacred Music (NET); Francis Albert Sinatra Does His Thing (CBS); The Rite of Spring (NET); Rowan & Martin's Laugh-In (NBC): "February 3, 1969"; Vladimir Horowitz: A Television Concert at Carnegie Hall (CBS)
**Outstanding Achievement in Daytime Programming - Programs**: **The Dick Cavett Show (ABC)**; Hollywood Squares (NBC)	**Outstanding Achievement in Sports Programming - Programs**: **19th Summer Olympics (ABC)**; **19th Summer Olympics (ABC) – Roone Arledge**; 19th Summer Olympics (ABC) – Chris Schenkel; ABC's Wide World of Sports (ABC)
**Outstanding Dramatic Program**: **Hallmark Hall of Fame: "Teacher, Teacher" (NBC)**; CBS Playhouse: "The People Next Door" (CBS); Heidi (NBC); A Midsummer Night's Dream (CBS); Mission: Impossible: "The Execution" (CBS); NET Playhouse: "Talking to a Stranger" (NET)

=== Acting ===
==== Lead performances ====
Acting
**Outstanding Continued Performance** **by an Actor in a Leading Role in a Comedy Series**: **Don Adams as Maxwell Smart in Get Smart (NBC)**; Brian Keith as Uncle Bill Davis in Family Affair (CBS); Edward Mulhare as Capt. Daniel Gregg in The Ghost & Mrs. Muir (NBC); Lloyd Nolan as Dr. Morton Chegley in Julia (NBC)	**Outstanding Continued Performance** **by an Actress in a Leading Role in a Comedy Series**: **Hope Lange as Carolyn Muir in The Ghost & Mrs. Muir (NBC)**; Diahann Carroll as Nurse Julia Baker in Julia (NBC); Barbara Feldon as Agent 99 in Get Smart (NBC); Elizabeth Montgomery as Samantha Stephens in Bewitched (ABC)
**Outstanding Continued Performance** **by an Actor in a Leading Role in a Dramatic Series**: **Carl Betz as Clinton Judd in Judd, for the Defense (ABC)**; Raymond Burr as Robert T. Ironside in Ironside (NBC); Peter Graves as James Phelps in Mission: Impossible (CBS); Martin Landau as Rollin Hand in Mission: Impossible (CBS); Ross Martin as Artemus Gordon in The Wild Wild West (CBS)	**Outstanding Continued Performance** **by an Actress in a Leading Role in a Dramatic Series**: **Barbara Bain as Cinnamon Carter in Mission: Impossible (CBS)**; Joan Blondell as Lottie Hatfield in Here Come the Brides (ABC); Peggy Lipton as Julie Barnes in The Mod Squad (ABC)

==== Supporting performances ====
**Outstanding Continued Performance** **by an Actor in a Supporting Role in a Series**: **Werner Klemperer as Col. Wilhelm Klink in Hogan's Heroes (CBS)**; Greg Morris as Barney Collier in Mission: Impossible (CBS); Leonard Nimoy as Mr. Spock in Star Trek (NBC)	**Outstanding Continued Performance** **by an Actress in a Supporting Role in a Series**: **Susan Saint James as Peggy Maxwell in The Name of the Game (NBC)**; Barbara Anderson as Officer Eve Whitfield in Ironside (NBC); Agnes Moorehead as Endora in Bewitched (ABC)

==== Single performances ====
**Outstanding Single Performance by an Actor in a Leading Role**: **Paul Scofield as Sir Emlyn Bowen, Q. C. in Male of the Species (NBC)**; Ossie Davis as Charles Carter in Hallmark Hall of Fame (NBC): "Teacher, Teacher"; David McCallum as Hamilton Cade in Hallmark Hall of Fame (NBC): "Teacher, Teacher"; Bill Travers as Crichton in Hallmark Hall of Fame (NBC): "The Admirable Crichton"	**Outstanding Single Performance by an Actress in a Leading Role**: **Geraldine Page as Sook in The Thanksgiving Visitor (ABC)**; Anne Baxter as Betty-Jean Currier in The Name of the Game (NBC): "The Bobbie Currier Story"; Lee Grant as Kay Gould in Judd, for the Defense (ABC): "The Gates of Cerberus"
**Outstanding Single Performance by an Actor in a Supporting Role (Note: The winner in this category would have been Billy Schulman.)**: Ned Glass as Sol Cooper in Julia (NBC): "A Little Chicken Soup Never Hurt Anybody"; Hal Holbrook as Chancellor Graham in The Bold Ones: The Lawyers (NBC): "The Whole World Is Watching"; Billy Schulman as Freddie Putnam in Hallmark Hall of Fame (NBC): "Teacher, Teacher"	**Outstanding Single Performance by an Actress in a Supporting Role**: **Anna Calder-Marshall as Mary McNeil in Male of the Species (NBC)**; Pamela Brown as Lady Brocklehurst in Hallmark Hall of Fame (NBC): "The Admirable Crichton"; Irene Hervey as Beatrice Brady in My Three Sons (CBS): "The O'Casey Scandal"; Nancy Kovack as Bret Nicols in Mannix (CBS): "The Girl Who Came in with the Tide"

=== Directing ===
Directing
**Outstanding Directorial Achievement in Comedy, Variety or Music**: **The Dean Martin Show (NBC): "October 17, 1968" – Greg Garrison**; The Bill Cosby Special (NBC) – Bill Hobin; Rowan & Martin's Laugh-In (NBC): "February 3, 1969" – Gordon Wiles	**Outstanding Directorial Achievement in Drama**: **CBS Playhouse (CBS): "The People Next Door" – David Greene**; CBS Playhouse (CBS): "Secrets" – Paul Bogart; Hallmark Hall of Fame (NBC): "Teacher, Teacher" – Fielder Cook

=== Writing ===
Writing
**Outstanding Writing Achievement in Comedy, Variety or Music**: **The Smothers Brothers Comedy Hour (CBS): "David Frye and Liberace"**; The Carol Burnett Show (CBS): "Nanette Fabray, Mel Tormé and Don Rickles"; Rowan & Martin's Laugh-In (NBC): "Don Rickles"	**Outstanding Writing Achievement in Drama**: **CBS Playhouse (CBS): "The People Next Door" – J.P. Miller**; CBS Playhouse (CBS): "The Experiment" – Ellen M. Violett; Hallmark Hall of Fame (NBC): "Teacher, Teacher" – Allan Sloane

== Withdrawal of award ==
The category Outstanding Single Performance by an Actor in a Supporting Role did not receive a winner, as it was ruled by the judges that the person who garnered the most votes (and therefore the de facto winner) Billy Schulman, was unfit to receive the prize as there were concerns that Schulmann, who was neurodivergent, would be incapable of delivering a speech according to producers' standards.

According to George Gent for the New York Times:

In accepting the award, George Lefferts, producer of the drama that was seen Feb. 5 on NBC’s Hallmark Hall of Fame, criticized the academy’s board of directors and panelists for omitting this year the category for outstanding performance by a supporting actor, for which Billy Schulman, 14, had been nominated. The youngster, who is retarded, received instead a special plaque.

Lefferts said he wished that Billy had been allowed to compete like any other actor, adding: "I think many of us are retarded in many important ways and we will try to make things better."

Later, Lefferts expressed "shock" over a CBS decision not to allow young Schulman to go up on the stage to receive his award, despite the fact that he had received his mother’s approval. Instead, the camera panned to the youngster.

Had Schulman been acknowledged as the winner, he would have been the youngest male actor to ever win a Primetime Emmy Award, a record instead currently held by Owen Cooper for Adolescence.

== Most major nominations ==
Networks with multiple major nominations (Note: "Major" constitutes the categories listed above: Program, Acting, Directing, and Writing. Does not include the technical categories.)
Network	Number of Nominations
NBC	36
CBS	22
ABC	14

Programs with multiple major nominations
Program	Category	Network	Number of Nominations
Mission: Impossible	Drama	CBS	6
Teacher, Teacher	Special	NBC	6
Julia	Comedy	NBC	4
Rowan & Martin's Laugh-In	Variety		4
19th Summer Olympics	Sports	ABC	3
Bewitched	Comedy	ABC	3
Get Smart	Comedy	NBC	3
The Ghost and Mrs. Muir	Comedy	NBC	3
Ironside	Drama	NBC	3
Judd, for the Defense	Drama	ABC	3
The Name of the Game	Drama	NBC	3
The People Next Door	Special	CBS	3
The Admirable Crichton	Special	NBC	2
The Bill Cosby Special	Variety		2
The Carol Burnett Show	Variety	CBS	2
The Dean Martin Show	Variety	NBC	2
Family Affair	Comedy	CBS	2
Male of the Species	Special	NBC	2
NET Playhouse	Drama	NET	2
The Smothers Brothers Comedy Hour	Variety	CBS	2

== Most major awards ==
Networks with multiple major awards
Network	Number of Awards
NBC	11
CBS	5
ABC	4

Programs with multiple major awards
Program	Category	Network	Number of Awards
19th Summer Olympics	Sports	ABC	2
Get Smart	Comedy	NBC	2
Male of the Species	Special	NBC	2
The People Next Door	Special	CBS	2
