= 20th Directors Guild of America Awards =

- Date: February 17, 1968
- Location: The Beverly Hilton, Beverly Hills, California
- Country: United States
- Presented by: Directors Guild of America
- Hosted by: Jerry Lewis

Highlights
- Best Director Feature Film: The Graduate – Mike Nichols
- Best Director Television: CBS Playhouse for "Do Not Go Gentle Into That Good Night" – George Schaefer
- Website: https://www.dga.org/Awards/History/1960s/1967.aspx?value=1967

The 20th Directors Guild of America Awards, honoring the outstanding directorial achievements in film and television in 1967, were presented on February 17, 1968, at the Beverly Hilton in Beverly Hills, California. The ceremony was hosted by Jerry Lewis. The feature film nominees were announced in January 1968.

== Winners and nominees ==
=== Film ===
Feature Film

Mike Nichols – The Graduate

- Robert Aldrich – The Dirty Dozen
- Richard Brooks – In Cold Blood
- James Clavell – To Sir, with Love
- Stanley Donen – Two for the Road
- Norman Jewison – In the Heat of the Night
- Stanley Kramer – Guess Who's Coming to Dinner
- Arthur Penn – Bonnie and Clyde
- Stuart Rosenberg – Cool Hand Luke
- Joseph Strick – Ulysses

=== Television ===
Television

George Schaefer – CBS Playhouse for "Do Not Go Gentle Into That Good Night"

- Earl Bellamy – I Spy for "Apollo"
- Paul Bogart – CBS Playhouse for "Dear Friends"
- Greg Garrison – The Dean Martin Show for "1968 Christmas Show"
- Jack Haley Jr. – Movin' with Nancy
- Dwight Hemion – Herb Alpert & The Tijuana Brass
- Robert Henry – The Andy Williams Show
- Clark Jones – The Carol Burnett Show
- Michael Ritchie – The Outsider
- Paul Stanley – Mission: Impossible for "The Council"

=== D.W. Griffith Award ===
- Alfred Hitchcock

=== Honorary Life Member ===
- Darryl F. Zanuck
