= Murder Among Friends =

Murder Among Friends may refer to:

- Murder Among Friends (1982 film), a made for television British film
- Murder Among Friends (TV series), an American documentary television series
- Murder Among Friends (1941 film), an American mystery film
