= NET Playhouse =

American Anthology series (1966–1972

- Genre: Anthology
- Country of origin: United States
- Original language: English
- No. of seasons: 6
- No. of episodes: 228

Production
- Executive producers: Curtis W. Davis; Jac Venza
- Cinematography: Boyd Estus

Original release
- Network: NET
- Release: October 7, 1966 – June 4, 1970
- Network: PBS
- Release: October 8, 1970 – May 25, 1972

NET Playhouse is an American dramatic television anthology series produced by National Educational Television. NET subsequently merged with WNDT Newark to form WNET, and was superseded by the Public Broadcasting Service, though the NET title did remain. In addition to episodes produced in the United States, the series also aired episodes that were originally produced and broadcast in the United Kingdom. The series occasionally broadcast feature films, such as L'Avventura and Knife in the Water.

== Partial list of episodes ==
- Tennessee Williams' "Ten Blocks on the Camino Real" (Martin Sheen, Carrie Nye, Janet Margolin; October 7, 1966)
- Ivan Turgenev/Ronald Ribman's The Journey of the Fifth Horse (Dustin Hoffman, Michael Tolan, Susan Anspach; October 14, 1966)
- Maxwell Anderson's The Star-Wagon (Dustin Hoffman, Orson Bean, Marian Seldes; October 21, 1966)
- Henrik Ibsen's An Enemy of the People (James Daly, Philip Bosco, Kate Reid; December 2, 1966)
- Christopher Fry's A Sleep of Prisoners (Barry Morse, Jon Voight; December 9, 1966)
- Ofoeti (René Auberjonois; December 16, 1966)
- Jerry Devine/Bruce Montgomery's The Amorous Flea (Lew Parker; January 6, 1967)
- La Mama Playwrights [Jean-Claude van Itallie, Sam Shepard, Paul Foster] (January 20, 1967) (re-broadcast 1969)
- The World of Carl Sandburg (Uta Hagen, Fritz Weaver; January 27, 1967)
- The Importance of Being Earnest (Susannah York, Patrick Macnee; February 17, 1967)
- The World of Kurt Weill (Lotte Leyna; February 24, 1967)
- The Old Glory: Benito Cereno [Herman Melville] (Roscoe Lee Browne, Frank Langella; March 24, 1967)
- George Bernard Shaw's Misalliance (Richard Dysart; April 7, 1967)
- A Mother for Janek (members of the American Conservatory Theater; May 5, 1967)
- Hugh Williams' The Irregular Verb To Love (Cornelia Otis Skinner, Cyril Ritchard; May 20, 1967)
- Duke Ellington - A Concert of Sacred Music (June 16, 1967)
- An Evening Journey to Conway Massachusetts (John Beal, Gary Burghoff; November 3, 1967)
- Infancy and Childhood (Eileen Brennan, Frances Sternhagen; December 15, 1967)
- Home (Irene Dailey, Roger Davis; January 19, 1968)
- Vinnette Carroll's Trumpets of the Lord (James Earl Jones; May 10, 1968)
- Igor Stravinsky/C. F. Ramuz's The Soldier's Tale (Svetlana Beriosova, Robert Helpmann; October 18, 1968)
- A Celebration of William Jennings Bryant (Roy Schneider, Barry Primus; December 6, 1968)
- National Theatre of the Deaf (January 17, 1969)
- Athol Fugard's Blood Knot (January 31, 1969)
- The Prodigal (Kim Hunter, Peter Galman; May 2, 1969)
- Paul Zindel's Let Me Hear You Whisper (Ruth White, Elizabeth Wilson; May 23, 1969)
- Theatre America: Story Theatre (Mildred Dunnock, David Clennon; November 27, 1969)
- Thoughts of the Artist on Leaving the Sixties (January 1, 1970)
- America, Inc. (Abbie Hoffman, David Silver; February 20, 1970)
- Generation of Leaves: Jesus - A Passion Play for Americans (Andreas Teuber, Laura Esterman, Asha Puthli, Kenneth Tigar; March 10, 1970)
- Trail of Tears (Joseph Cotten, Johnny Cash, Jack Palance; April 8, 1970)
- They Have Taken Over (Jack Gilford, Carmen Mathews; April 17, 1970)
- El Tenlro Campesino (June 4, 1970)
- The Ceremony of Innocence (Richard Kiley, William Hickey; June 4, 1970)
- Helen Hayes Remembers (October 8, 1970)
- A Scent of Flowers (Aileen Seaton, Paul Harding; October 15, 1970)
- The Sand Castle (Barry Symonds, Jean Fowler; November 19, 1970)
- The Tape Recorder (Inga Swenson, Michael Tolan; November 19, 1970)
- Foul! (Charlotte Rae, Sam Waterston; November 26, 1970)
- Actor's Choice (Gwen Verdon, Cyril Ritchard; November 26, 1970)
- Tennessee Williams' Dragon Country (Kim Stanley, Lois Smith; December 13, 1970)
- Arthur Miller's A Memory of Two Mondays (Jack Warden, Estelle Parsons; January 28, 1971)
- Hard Travelin' (Ralph Meeker; February 4, 1971)
- Paradise Lost part 1 (Eli Wallach, Jo Van Fleet; February 18, 1971)
- Paradise Lost part 2 (Eli Wallach, Jo Van Fleet; February 25, 1971)
- Sam and John Adams (Laurence Luckinbill; May 13, 1971)
- The Wright Brothers (Stacy Keach, James Keach; June 24, 1971)
- William Alfred's Hogan's Goat (Faye Dunaway, Robert Foxworth, Rue McClanahan; October 11, 1971)
- Lorraine Hansberry: To Be Young Gifted and Black (Ruby Dee, Claudia McNeil, Al Freeman Jr.; January 20, 1972)
- Harriet (Kitty Winn, Richard Dysart, Madeleine Sherwood; February 3, 1972)
- Between Time and Timbuktu, based on the fiction of Kurt Vonnegut, featuring William Hickey, Bob & Ray; March 13, 1972
- George Washington - Portrait of the Hero as a Young Man (René Auberjonois; April 13, 1972)
- Loring Mandel's Particular Men (Stacy Keach, Verna Bloom, and Lois Smith (May 8, 1972)
- The Last G.I.'s (May 25, 1972)
