= Something About Lee Wiley =

- Bob Hope Presents the Chrysler Theatre episode
- Benny Carter and Piper Laurie in Something About Lee Wiley
- Episode no.: Season 1 Episode 2
- Directed by: Sidney Pollack
- Written by: David Rayfiel
- Original air date: October 11, 1963
- Running time: 1 hour

Guest appearances
- Piper Laurie as Lee Wiley; Claude Rains as Mr. Fare; Steven Hill as Ruben Fare

Episode chronology
← Previous "A Killing at Sundial"	Next → "Seven Miles of Bad Road"

"Something About Lee Wiley" was an American television episode broadcast by NBC on October 11, 1963, as part of the television series, Bob Hope Presents the Chrysler Theatre. The film told the story of jazz singer Lee Wiley. Piper Laurie played the role of Wiley.

It was written by David Rayfiel and directed by Sidney Pollack. Rayfiel and Pollack were both nominated for Emmy Awards.

== Plot ==
Singer Lee Wiley (played by Piper Laurie) suffers temporary blindness after being injured in a fall from a horse in Oklahoma. Her marriage to bandleader Jess Stacy later fails.

== Cast ==
The cast included performances by:

- Piper Laurie as Lee Wiley
- Claude Rains as Mr. Fare
- Steven Hill as Ruben Fare
- Alfred Ryder as Paul Eastlake
- Lyle Talbot as Taylor
- Barbara Stuart as Janice
- Ruth White as Mama

== Production ==
The production was nominated at the 16th Primetime Emmy Awards in two categories: Sydney Pollack for outstanding directorial achievement in drama; and David Rayfiel for outstanding writing achievement in drama, original.

Benny Carter appeared in the film as the band leader and also composed original music used in the film. The singing was dubbed by Joy Bryan.
