= My Father and My Mother =

- CBS Playhouse episode
- Episode no.: Season 1 Episode 4
- Directed by: George Schaefer
- Written by: Robert J. Crean
- Original air date: February 13, 1968

Episode chronology
← Previous "Dear Friends"	Next → "Secrets"

"My Father and My Mother" is the fourth television play episode of the first season of the American television series CBS Playhouse. The episode starred Gene Hackman as a New York editor struggling as a husband and parent who looks back and learns of the difficulties his own parents faced in life.

The episode was broadcast February 13, 1968, and received an Emmy award nomination for the score, written by Bernard Green.
