= Murder Among Friends (1982 film) =

- Directed by: David Greene
- Based on: 1975 stage play Murder Among Friends by Bob Barry
- Starring: Leslie Nielsen; Sally Kellerman
- Music by: Arthur B. Rubinstein
- Release date: 1982
- Country: United Kingdom
- Language: English

Murder Among Friends is a 1982 made for television British film directed by David Greene and starring Leslie Nielsen and Sally Kellerman.

A "farcical mystery", it was originally written by Bob Barry for the New York stage in 1975. The stage production debuted on Broadway's Biltmore Theater and starred Janet Leigh and Jack Cassidy. Debuting on December 28, 1975, it ran for seventeen performances, closing on January 10, 1976. It received mixed reviews.

== Cast ==
- Leslie Nielsen
- Sally Kellerman
- Tony Margulies as Body Guard
- Joy Michelle Moore
