= Secrets (CBS Playhouse) =

- CBS Playhouse episode
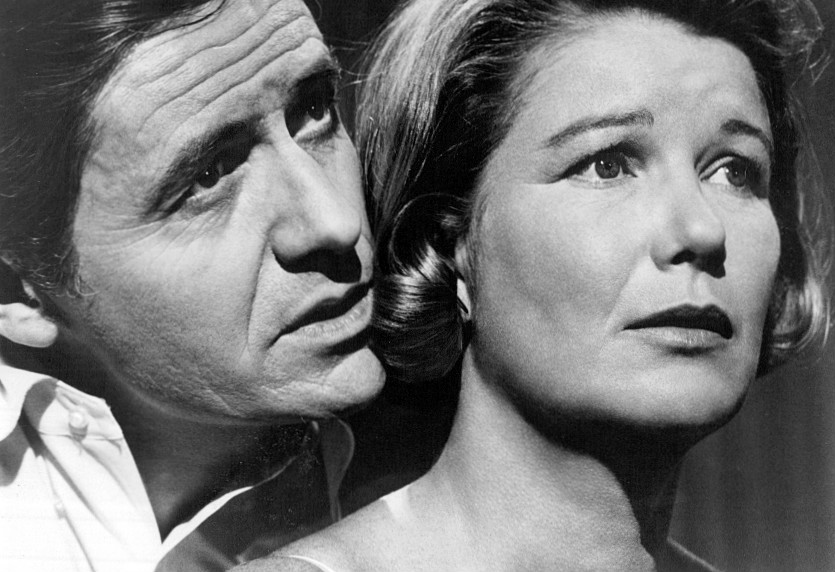
- Arthur Hill and Barbara Bel Geddes in "Secrets"
- Episode no.: Season 1 Episode 5
- Directed by: Paul Bogart
- Written by: Tad Mosel
- Original air date: May 5, 1968

Episode chronology
← Previous "My Father and My Mother"	Next → "The People Next Door"

"Secrets" is the fifth television play episode of the first season of the American television series CBS Playhouse. The episode tells the story of Doris Gray, a wife who believes her husband is hiding something from her and details the way the secrets between the two threaten to split them apart.

The episode aired May 5, 1968, and received an Emmy award nomination for Paul Bogart for direction.
