= The Final War of Olly Winter =

- CBS Playhouse episode
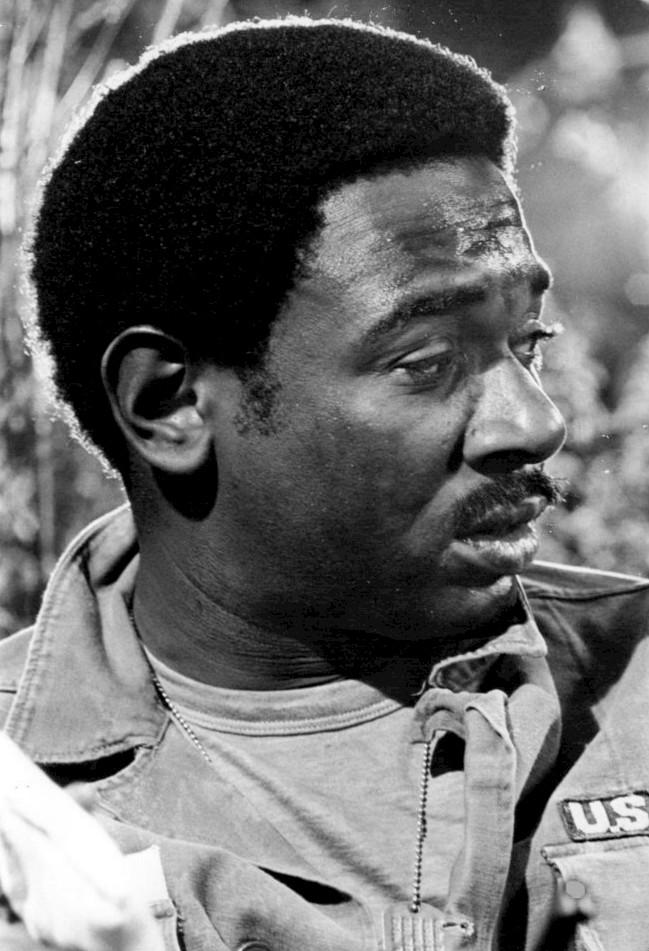
- Ivan Dixon in "The Final War of Olly Winter"
- Episode no.: Season 1 Episode 1
- Directed by: Paul Bogart
- Written by: Ronald Ribman
- Original air date: January 29, 1967

Episode chronology
| ← Previous — | Next → "Do Not Go Gentle Into That Good Night" |

"The Final War of Olly Winter" is the debut episode of the American television series CBS Playhouse, broadcast on CBS on January 29, 1967. A television play written by Ronald Ribman, it follows the tale of Olly Winter, an African-American Master Sergeant in the Vietnam War who is walking back to allied-controlled land following a battle with the Viet Cong. Along the way, he meets up with a Vietnamese girl, an orphaned infant, and a dog. The program is basically a monologue as the character of Winter speaks to the girl about his experiences even though she cannot understand him.

Ivan Dixon, who played the title character, was nominated for an Emmy Award for his performance.

== Cast ==
- Ivan Dixon as Olly Winter
- Maidie Norman as Mrs. Pierce
- Paulene Myers as Olly's mother
- James Hong as Vietnamese lieutenant
- Tina Chen as Vietnamese girl
- Patrick Adiarte as Viet Cong guerilla
- Kam Tong as Chief elder
- Rupert Crosse as Funeral director
