= David Greene (director) =

English film director and actor (1921–2003)

- Born: David Brian Lederman; 22 February 1921; Manchester, England
- Died: 7 April 2003 (aged 82); Ojai, California, U.S.
- Education: Royal Academy of Dramatic Art
- Occupations: Film director, television director, actor

Lucius David Syms-Greene (born David Brian Lederman; 22 February 1921 – 7 April 2003) was an English film and television director, and actor. He was a four-time Primetime Emmy Award winner and a three-time Directors Guild of America Award nominee.

== Early life ==
The son of a Russian Jewish father and an Irish mother, Greene was born in Manchester in 1921. originally trained as a journalist, working for the Walthamstow Guardian. During the Second World War he served in the merchant navy, but was invalided out in 1941. He became Publicity Manager for the Everyman Theatre in London before deciding to become an actor.

He graduated from Royal Academy of Dramatic Art, and further perfected his craft at the Oxford Playhouse, where he worked under the director Peter Ashmore.

== Career ==
Greene began public performances in 1948, including roles at the Old Vic. He moved into British films in the same year, including some minor "classics" such as The Wooden Horse (1950). After touring North America with Laurence Olivier and Vivien Leigh in a production of Antony and Cleopatra, he decided to settle in Canada. He worked in television production with the CBC in Toronto, including on the acclaimed 1956 television play Flight into Danger. Later that year, he moved to Los Angeles.

Most of his initial films as a director, however, were made and produced back in Britain, and it was only in the mid-1970s that he became firmly established in Hollywood as a filmmaker for television. Over the course of his career, he won four Primetime Emmy Awards: three for Outstanding Directing for a Drama Series (CBS Playhouse, Rich Man, Poor Man, Roots) and one for Outstanding Directing for a Limited Series or Special (Friendly Fire). He also directed the film version of the musical Godspell, which was nominated for the Palme d'Or at the 1973 Cannes Film Festival.

== Personal life ==
Greene was married seven times: Margaret Lane (1941–48), Katherine Blake (1948–59), Eileen Grace Jack (1959–70), Thomasina Doreen Patricia Jones (1972–73), Vanessa Linsell (1975–81), Lauren Rickey Greene (1981–2001) and Kelly Greene (2003). Greene was divorced from five of his seven wives. His marriage to Thomasina ended in her death and his seventh ended in his own death of pancreatic cancer three days later. He had one child each with Vanessa Linsell, Thomasina Jones, Eileen Grace Jack and Katherine Blake.

=== Death ===
He died aged 82 on 7 April 2003 of pancreatic cancer, in Ojai, California.

== Partial filmography ==
=== Actor ===
- Daughter of Darkness (1948)
- The Small Voice (1948)
- The Golden Madonna (1949)
- The Wooden Horse (1950)
- Let's Have a Murder (1950)
- The Dark Light (1951)

=== Director (feature films) ===
- The Shuttered Room (1967)
- Sebastian (1968)
- The Strange Affair (1968)
- I Start Counting (1969)
- The People Next Door (1970)
- Madame Sin (1972)
- Godspell (1973) (nominated for the Golden Palm at the Cannes Film Festival)
- London Conspiracy (1974) (co-directed with James Hill; released in Italy)
- Gray Lady Down (1978)
- Hard Country (1981)

=== Director (television films and miniseries) ===
- Shane (1966), episodes The Great Invasion, Part 1-2 starring David Carradine, Constance Ford, and Bradford Dillman
- The People Next Door (1968), an episode of season 2 of CBS Playhouse, starring Eli Wallach and Julie Harris, which was subsequently refilmed as a theatrical release in 1970 (won Emmy Award for Outstanding Directorial Achievement in Drama)
- The Count of Monte Cristo (1975), starring Richard Chamberlain, Kate Nelligan and Tony Curtis
- Rich Man, Poor Man (1976), starring Nick Nolte and Ray Milland (won Emmy Award for Outstanding Directing in a Drama Series)
- Roots (1977), starring Lorne Greene and Maya Angelou (won Emmy Award for Outstanding Directing in a Drama Series, alongside Marvin J. Chomsky, John Erman and Gilbert Moses)
- The Trial of Lee Harvey Oswald (1977), starring Lorne Greene and Ben Gazzara
- Friendly Fire (1979), starring Carol Burnett (won Emmy for Outstanding Directing in a Limited Series or a Special)
- A Vacation in Hell (1979), starring Priscilla Barnes
- Rehearsal for Murder (1982), starring Robert Preston and Lynn Redgrave
- Murder Among Friends (1982), starring Sally Kellerman and Leslie Nielsen
- Fatal Vision (1984), starring Karl Malden and Eva Marie Saint
- The Guardian (1984), starring Martin Sheen and Louis Gossett Jr.
- Guilty Conscience (1985), starring Anthony Hopkins and Blythe Danner
- Circle of Violence (1986), starring Tuesday Weld and River Phoenix (won a Wise Owl Award for Outstanding Television Film)
- The Betty Ford Story (1987), starring Gena Rowlands and Josef Sommer
- Inherit the Wind (1988), starring Kirk Douglas and Jason Robards Jr.
- Liberace: Behind the Music (1988), starring Victor Garber
- Small Sacrifices (1989), starring Ryan O'Neal and Farrah Fawcett
- The Penthouse (1989), starring Robin Givens
- In the Best Interest of the Child (1990), starring Meg Tilly
- What Ever Happened to Baby Jane? (1991), starring the Redgrave sisters, Lynn and Vanessa, a remake of the 1962 film of the same name.
- Willing to Kill: The Texas Cheerleader Story (1992), starring Lesley Ann Warren and Dennis Christopher
- Children of the Dust (1995), starring Sidney Poitier
- A Season in Purgatory (1996), starring Patrick Dempsey
- Breach of Faith: A Family of Cops 2 (1997), starring Charles Bronson and Daniel Baldwin
- Bella Mafia (1997), starring Vanessa Redgrave, Nastassja Kinski, Jennifer Tilly and Dennis Farina
