= Ronald Ribman =

American author, poet and playwright (1932–2025)

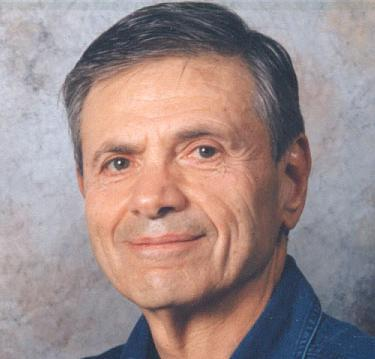
- Born: May 28, 1932; New York City, U.S.
- Died: May 15, 2025 (aged 92); Dallas, Texas, U.S.
- Occupations: Poet, playwright, author
- Spouse: Alice Rosen
- Children: James and Elana
- Writing career
- Period: 20th and 21st centuries
- Genre: Plays
- Notable works: The Poison Tree, Cold Storage, The Journey of the Fifth Horse
- Notable awards: Obie Award, Emmy Nomination, Hull-Warriner Award, Rockefeller Foundation Fellow
- Website: ronaldribman.com

Ronald Burt Ribman (May 28, 1932 – May 15, 2025) was an American author, poet and playwright.

== Biography ==
Ribman was born in Sydenham Hospital in New York City to Samuel M. Ribman, a lawyer, and Rosa (Lerner) Ribman. He attended public school in Brooklyn, and graduated P.S. 188 in 1944. Ribman attended Mark Twain Jr. High School, graduating in 1947, and Abraham Lincoln H.S., graduating in 1950. Ribman is a graduate of the University of Pittsburgh, receiving his bachelor's degree in 1954, his master's degree in 1958, and his PhD in 1962. In August 1967, he married Alice Rosen, a registered nurse. The Ribmans have two children, James and Elana.

Ribman served in the United States Army from 1954 to 1956. Following his military service, Ribman worked as a coal broker for the J.E. Ribman Coal Co of Johnstown, Pennsylvania, from 1956 to 1957. Ribman was an assistant professor of English Literature at Otterbein College from 1962 to 1963, and left academia to focus on his plays in 1964. He died at a hospital in Dallas, Texas on May 15, 2025, at the age of 92.

== Literature ==
Ribman's poetry first appeared in literary magazines as The Beloit Poetry Journal and The Colorado Quarterly. Ribman's first commercial publication was an article, co-authored with his father, in the April 1964 issue of Harper's Magazine, titled "The Poor Man in the Scales," a study of the problems faced by indigent defendants in the federal courts. Ribman's most famous early play, The Journey of the Fifth Horse based on Ivan Turgenev's short story "The Diary of a Superfluous Man," won an Obie Award and starred Dustin Hoffman in the role of Zoditch.

=== Novel ===
- Infinite Absence, 1st Edition 2016; 2nd Edition,2021

=== Plays ===
- Harry, Noon and Night, The American Place Theatre, 1965. (Subsequently produced off-Broadway at The Pocket Theater)
- The Journey of the Fifth Horse, The American Place Theatre, 1966.
- The Ceremony of Innocence, The American Place Theatre, 1967.
- Passing Through From Exotic Places, Sheridan Square Playhouse, 1969.
- Fingernails Blue As Flowers, The American Place Theatre, 1971.
- A Break in the Skin, Yale Repertory Company, 1972. (Subsequently produced at The Actors Studio, 1972.)
- The Poison Tree, The Playhouse in the Park, Philadelphia, PA. and Westport Playhouse, CT, 1973. (Subsequently revised and produced on Broadway at the Ambassador Theater, 1976.)
- Cold Storage, The American Place Theatre, 1977. (Subsequently produced on Broadway at the Lyceum Theater, 1977.)
- Buck, Playwrights Horizons/ The American Place Theatre, 1983.
- Sweet Table at the Richelieu, The American Repertory Theatre, Cambridge, MA., 1987.
- The Cannibal Masque, The American Repertory Theater, Cambridge, MA., 1987.
- A Serpent's Egg, The American Repertory Theater, Cambridge, MA., 1987.
- The Rug Merchants of Chaos, Pasadena Playhouse, Pasadena, CA., 1991.
- Dream of the Red Spider, The American Repertory Theater, Cambridge, MA., 1993.

=== Screenplays and television ===
- The Journey of the Fifth Horse, National Educational Television, 1966.
- The Final War of Olly Winter, CBS Playhouse, 1967.
- The Most Beautiful Fish, PBS, 1969; published in The New York Times, November 23, 1969.
- The Angel Levine (with Bill Gunn, based on a short story by Bernard Malamud), United Artists, 1969.
- The Ceremony of Innocence, NET Playhouse, 1970; subsequently adapted by Granada Television in 1974.
- Cold Storage, A&E Network, 1984.
- Seize the Day (based on the novella by Saul Bellow), PBS Playhouse, 1987.
- The Sunset Gang series (based on the stories of Warren Adler, including Yiddish, The Detective, and Home), PBS, 1991.

=== Publications ===
- Ronald Ribman Two Plays: The Journey of the Fifth Horse & Harry, Noon and Night, Little Brown, 1967.
- The Journey of the Fifth Horse, Samuel French, 1967.
- The Journey of the Fifth Horse, The Off Off Broadway Book, edited by Albert Poland and Bruce Mailman, Bobbs-Merrill Co., 1972.
- The Ceremony of Innocence, Dramatists Play Service, 1968.
- Passing Through From Exotic Places (contains three one-act plays: The Son Who Hunted Tigers in Jakarta, Sunstroke, and The Burial of Esposito), Dramatists Play Service, 1970.
- The Burial of Esposito in The Best Short Plays 1971, edited by Stanley Richards, Avon, 1971.
- Fingernails Blue as Flowers in The American Place Theatre: Plays, edited by Richard Schotter, Dell, 1973.
- The Final War Of Olly Winter in One Act Plays For Our Times, edited by Dr. Francis Griffith, Popular Library, 1973.
- The Journey of the Fifth Horse, Davis Poynter, 1974.
- Cold Storage, Samuel French, 1976.
- Cold Storage, Nelson Doubleday, 1976.
- Five Plays by Ronald Ribman (contains Harry, Noon and Night, The Journey of the Fifth Horse, The Ceremony of Innocence, The Poison Tree, and Cold Storage), Avon, 1978.
- Buck in New Plays USA, edited by M. Elizabeth Osborn, Theater Communications Group, 1984.
- Sweet Table at the Richelieu in American Theater, Vol. 4, Number 4, July/August 1987.
- The Rug Merchants of Chaos and Other Plays (contains Buck, Sweet Table at the Richelieu, and The Rug Merchants of Chaos), Theater Communications Group, 1992.
- The Cannibal Masque in The Best American Short Plays 1994–1995, edited by Howard Stein and Glenn Young, Applause, 1995.
- "Shirley" from Buck by Ronald Ribman in Contemporary American Monologues for Women, edited by Todd London, Theater Communications Group, 1998.

== Awards and fellowships ==
- Obie Award, Best Play 1966, The Journey of the Fifth Horse.
- Emmy Nomination, Outstanding Writing Achievement in Drama, 1966–1967, The Final War of Olly Winter.
- Straw Hat Award, Best New Play, 1973, The Poison Tree.
- Dramatists Guild, Hull-Warriner Award, 1976–1977, Cold Storage.
- Pulitzer Prize Nomination in Drama, 1978, Cold Storage.
- Playwrights USA Award, 1984, Buck.
- Kennedy Center, Fund For New American Plays, 1991, The Rug Merchants of Chaos.
- Rockefeller Foundation Fellowship, 1966, 1968.
- Guggenheim Foundation Fellowship, 1970.
- National Endowment for the Arts Fellowship, 1974, 1986–87.

In 1975, Ribman was honored by the Rockefeller Foundation with a Playwright-In-Residence fellowship for sustained contribution to American Theater.

In 1983, Ribman's play Cold Storage was chosen to be staged by Classic Theater International at the Hague, Netherlands to celebrate the 200th anniversary of the establishment of Dutch-American diplomatic relations. Subsequently, a luncheon in his honor was held at the American embassy.

== Critical commentary and analysis ==
After the American Repertory Theater's world premiere of Ribman's Sweet Table at the Richelieu, Jonathan Marks identified a central theme in Ribman's work as having "a preoccupation with the persistence of the past in the present—a recognition that we all carry with us a heavy baggage of seeds, each of which began sprouting at a different time in the past, and never stopped shooting out tendrils: a bag of memories which can never be simply dumped."

== Bibliography and further commentary ==
- Gottfried, Martin (1967). A theater divided; the postwar American stage. Boston: Little, Brown. pp. 74–75. LCCN 67028225. OCLC 923840.
- Gottfried, Martin (1969). Opening Nights: Theater Criticism of the Sixties. New York City: G. P. Putnam's Sons. pp. 202–204. LCCN 72099284. OCLC 44683.
- Weales, Gerald Clifford (1969). The jumping-off place; American drama in the 1960s. New York City: Macmillan Publishers. pp. 229–234. LCCN 69010544. OCLC 3831.
- Brustein, Robert Sanford (1969). "Journey and Arrival of a Playwright". The third theatre. New York City: Alfred A. Knopf. pp. 43–46. ISBN 0-224-61854-7. LCCN 69016612. OCLC 5623.
- Dietz, Susan H. (1974). The Work of Ronald Ribman: The Poet As Playwright (Dissertation). University of Pennsylvania.
- Hoffman, Daniel; Leo Braudy (1979). Harvard guide to contemporary American writing. Cambridge, MA: Belknap Press. pp. 422–424. ISBN 0-674-37535-1. LCCN 79010930. OCLC 4774781.
- Berney, KA (1993) [1973]. Contemporary dramatists (5th ed.). London: St. James. ISBN 978-1-55862-185-5. LCCN 90656160. OCLC 28766027.
- Contemporary Literary Criticism, Volume 7, Gale, 1977.

·Starr, Bernard (August 4, 2016) "Famed Playwright Switches Genres. Interview With Ronald Ribman About His New Novel, Infinite Absence" Huffington Post.
