= Loring Mandel =

American writer (1928–2020)

Loring Mandel (May 5, 1928 – March 24, 2020) was an American playwright and screenwriter whose notable works include the television film Conspiracy. He wrote for radio, television, film and the stage.

== Early and personal life ==
Mandel was a native of Chicago. He graduated from the University of Wisconsin–Madison in 1949, after studying writing and drama. He married his wife Dorothy in 1950, and they had two sons, one of whom grew up to be a video game writer/designer.

Mandel's first job upon returning to Chicago after graduation was as a music arranger for the American Broadcasting Company's house orchestra. He supplemented his income by writing film trailers for motion pictures as well as television variety shows. Mandel next worked full-time for the W.B. Doner advertising agency until 1952 when he entered the army for service in the Korean War.

== Career ==
Upon his release from the army in 1954, Mandel moved to New York and began his full-time career as a writer for the CBS anthologies Studio One in Hollywood, The Seven Lively Arts" and Playhouse 90. In 1959, his "Project Immortality" script for Playhouse 90 won a Sylvania Award and his first Emmy nomination for best drama. In 1968 he won his first Emmy for "Do Not Go Gentle Into That Good Night" on CBS Playhouse. In 1971–72, he was head writer on the CBS Daytime serial Love of Life, for which he won the 1973 Writers Guild of America Award for Best Writing in a Daytime Serial.

Besides his prolific work in television, Mandel wrote the screenplays for three produced feature films: Countdown (1967), a science fiction drama directed by Robert Altman, starring James Caan and Robert Duvall; Promises in the Dark (1979), a medical drama produced and directed by Jerome Hellman, starring Marsha Mason; and The Little Drummer Girl (1984), a political drama directed by George Roy Hill and starring Diane Keaton.

Mandel's best known and most acclaimed work was the 2001 TV film Conspiracy, which dramatized the 1942 Wannsee Conference and featured an ensemble cast, including Kenneth Branagh, Stanley Tucci, and Colin Firth. The film was nominated for multiple awards and Mandel personally won the 2001 Primetime Emmy Award for Outstanding Writing For a Miniseries or a Movie.

In 2004, Mandel received the Paddy Chayefsky lifetime achievement award at the 56th Writers Guild of America Awards. On June 15, 2010, Steven Bowie interviewed Mandel for the Archive of American Television.

Mandel's papers, scripts, articles, and correspondence are collected by the Wisconsin Center for Film and Theater Research, an archive of the University of Wisconsin-Madison and the Wisconsin Historical Society. In total, he and his dramas have been awarded two Emmy awards (out of five total nominations), a Sylvania award, a number of Writers Guild Awards, two Peabody awards, and a BAFTA as well.

Mandel died on March 24, 2020, at age 91 in Lenox, Massachusetts
