= Do Not Go Gentle Into That Good Night (CBS Playhouse) =

- CBS Playhouse episode
- Episode no.: Season 1 Episode 2
- Directed by: George Schaefer
- Written by: Loring Mandel
- Original air date: October 17, 1967

Episode chronology
← Previous "The Final War of Olly Winter"	Next → "Dear Friends"

"Do Not Go Gentle Into That Good Night" is the second television play episode of the first season of the American television series CBS Playhouse. The title of the episode is taken from the first line of a Dylan Thomas poem, which tells the story of a carpenter who has built his own home, but is now too old and infirm to live on his own, and is sent to live in an old age home against his desires.

It was broadcast October 17, 1967, and was eventually nominated for five Emmy awards, including a nomination for supporting actor Lawrence Dobkin, a win in the category of best actor for Melvyn Douglas in the lead role, and a win in the category of Outstanding Writing Achievement in Drama for Loring Mandel.
