= The People Next Door (CBS Playhouse) =

- CBS Playhouse episode
- Episode no.: Season 2 Episode 1
- Directed by: David Greene
- Written by: J. P. Miller
- Original air date: October 15, 1968

Episode chronology
← Previous "Secrets"	Next → "Saturday Adoption"

"The People Next Door" is the first television play episode of the second season of the American television series CBS Playhouse. A drama about a family dealing with the daughter's use of LSD, it was written by J. P. Miller and won three Emmy awards for camerawork, best director, and best writer; as well as a nomination for Best Dramatic Program.

It debuted on October 15, 1968, and was the 20th highest viewed program of the week, with a 20.8 rating and 36 share.

The episode was later filmed in 1970 as The People Next Door, with many of the actors from the teleplay reprising their roles for the theatrical release.
