= Dear Friends (CBS Playhouse) =

- CBS Playhouse episode
- Episode no.: Season 1 Episode 3
- Directed by: Paul Bogart
- Written by: Reginald Rose
- Original air date: December 6, 1967

Episode chronology
← Previous "Do Not Go Gentle Into That Good Night"	Next → "My Father and My Mother"

"Dear Friends" is the third television play episode of the first season of the American television series CBS Playhouse. The episode was a two-part installment about a married couple looking at divorce, and the attempts of their friends to try to repair their marriage becoming a look at the relationships that they themselves have.

It aired December 6, 1967, and was nominated for five Emmy awards, including a win by Paul Bogart for direction.
