= George Roy Hill filmography =

Director filmography

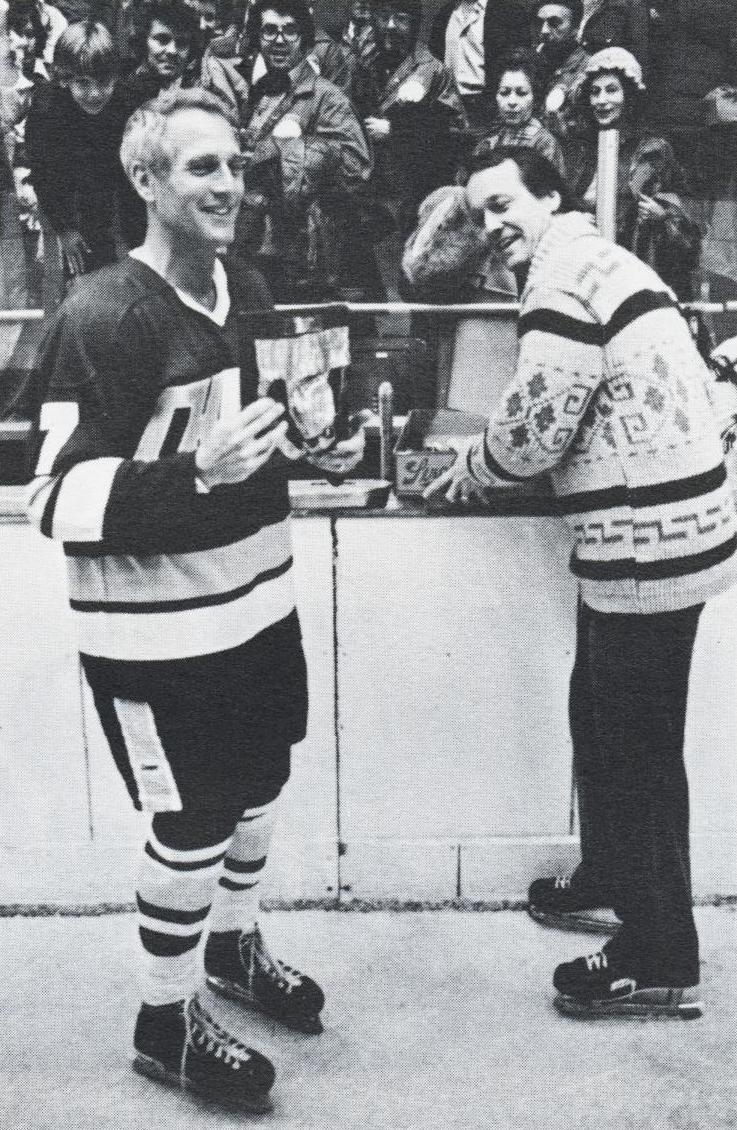
Hill (right) with actor Paul Newman on the set of Slap Shot in 1976

George Roy Hill (1921–2002) was an American film director whose work in theater, television, and film spanned over four decades. Known for his successful collaborations with actors Robert Redford and Paul Newman, Hill directed fourteen feature films in a variety of genres, including romance, musicals, and historical pieces, while his notable Western feature, Butch Cassidy and the Sundance Kid (1969), is regarded for its watershed influence on 1960s–1970s Hollywood. (Note: Attributed to multiple sources)

Hill began his career during television's first Golden Age in the 1950s, writing, directing, and acting in episodes for the early television plays of Kraft Television Theatre, following a brief career on stage working in off-Broadway roles. As an actor, Hill appeared in a supporting role in the feature film noir picture Walk East on Beacon (1952). He drew from his military experiences in the Korean War to write screenplays for the TV drama episodes "My Brother's Keeper" and "Keep Our Honor Bright" in 1953. Hill began directing teleplays for episodes of Pond's Theater and Lux Video Theatre in 1954, while continuing to work on Kraft Theater and eventually earning two Emmy nominations for his writing and direction of the episode "A Night to Remember" in 1956. He directed several notable episodes of the anthology series Playhouse 90, including "The Helen Morgan Story" (1957), "The Last Clear Chance" (1958), "Child of Our Time" (1958), and "Judgment at Nuremberg" (1959), as well as episodes for The Kaiser Aluminum Hour, before ultimately returning to Broadway directing in 1957.

In 1962, Hill made his film directorial debut with his feature adaptation of Period of Adjustment, starring Tony Franciosa and Jane Fonda in one of her earliest breakthrough roles. He continued a brief run of stage-to-film adaptations with his subsequent release of Toys in the Attic (1963), from Lillian Hellman's play of the same name. Hill's next film, The World of Henry Orient (1964), was adapted from a novel by Nora Johnson and starred Peter Sellers as the eccentric concert pianist Henry Orient. After replacing Fred Zinnemann as appointed director, Hill achieved his first major commercial success with the large-budget blockbuster release Hawaii (1966). Hill then directed the 1967 musical Thoroughly Modern Millie, starring Julie Andrews, which became one of the highest-grossing films of that year in North America, and was nominated for seven Academy Awards and five Golden Globe Awards.

Hill directed Robert Redford and Paul Newman in the 1969 Western Butch Cassidy and the Sundance Kid from a screenplay by William Goldman, which became a major commercial and critical success. He followed this with Slaughterhouse-Five (1972) before reuniting with Newman and Redford for The Sting (1973), which won seven of its 10 Oscar nominations at the 46th Academy Awards, including Best Picture, Best Director, and Best Original Screenplay. The combined success of Butch Cassidy and the Sundance Kid and The Sting briefly made Hill the only director to have made two of the ten highest-grossing films in motion picture history. His later work included The Great Waldo Pepper (1975), Slap Shot (1977), A Little Romance (1979), The World According to Garp (1982), The Little Drummer Girl (1984), and Funny Farm (1988), after which he retired from filmmaking to teach drama at Yale University.

== Film ==
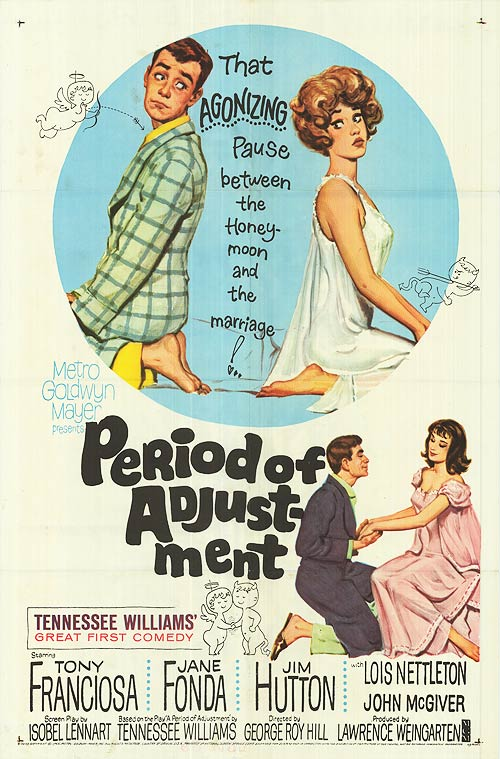
Poster for Period of Adjustment (1962)

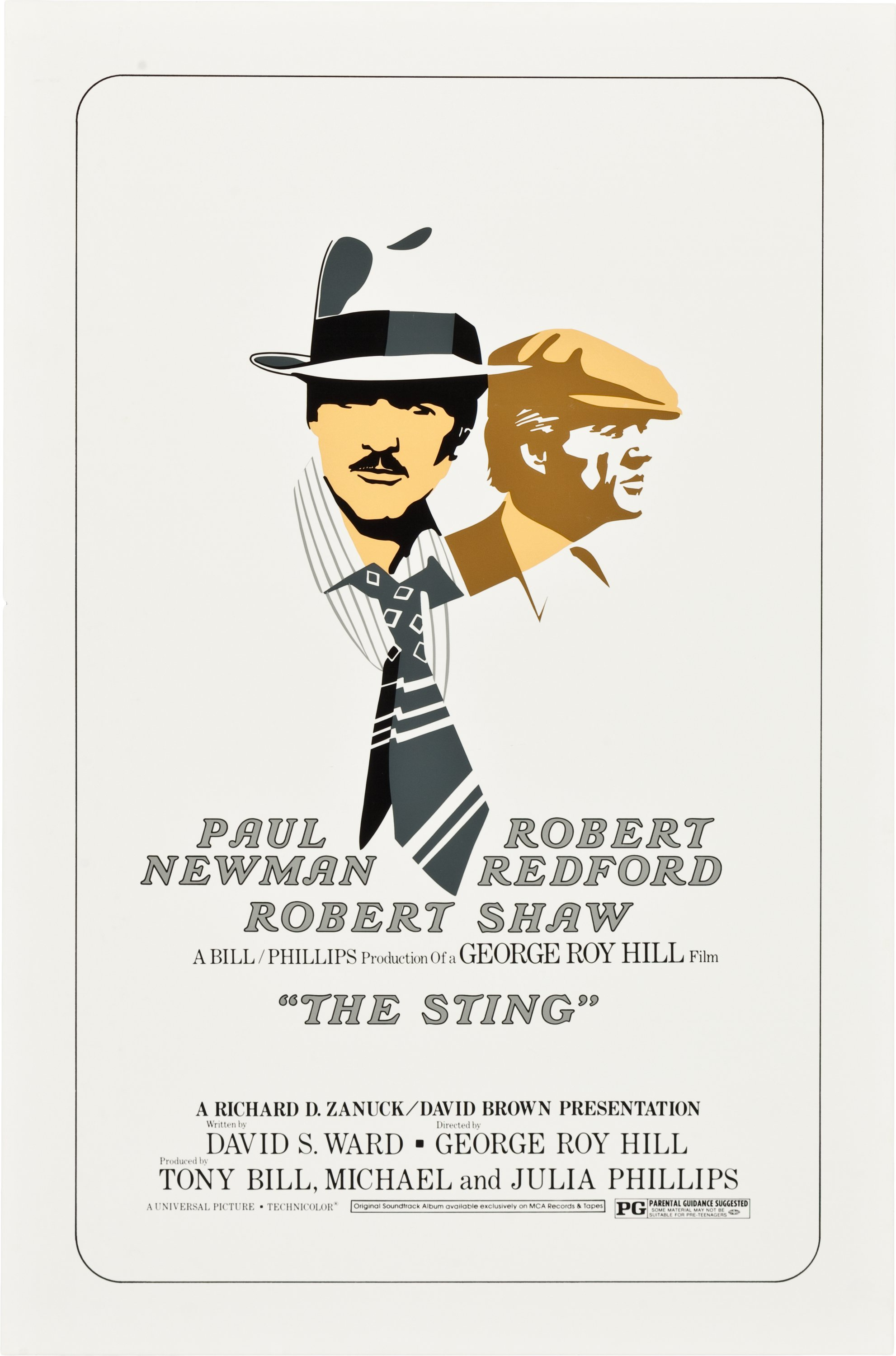
Poster for The Sting (1973)

Year	Title	director	screenWriter	Producer	Notes	Ref(s).
1962	Period of Adjustment	Yes	No	No	Based on the 1960 play by Tennessee Williams	
1963	Toys in the Attic	Yes	No	No	Based on the 1960 play by Lillian Hellman	
1964	The World of Henry Orient	Yes	No	No	Based on the 1958 novel by Nora Johnson	
1966	Hawaii	Yes	No	No	Based on the 1959 novel by James A. Michener	
1967	Thoroughly Modern Millie	Yes	No	No	Based on the 1956 British musical Chrysanthemum	
1969	Butch Cassidy and the Sundance Kid	Yes	No	No		
1972	Slaughterhouse-Five	Yes	No	No	Based on the 1969 novel by Kurt Vonnegut	
1973	The Sting	Yes	No	No		
1975	The Great Waldo Pepper	Yes	Story	No		
1977	Slap Shot	Yes	No	No		
1979	A Little Romance	Yes	Yes	No	Based on the 1977 novel E=mc^{2} Mon Amour by Patrick Cauvin	
1982	The World According to Garp	Yes	No	Yes	Based on the 1978 novel by John Irving	
1984	The Little Drummer Girl	Yes	Uncredited	No	Based on the 1983 novel by John le Carré	
1988	Funny Farm	Yes	No	No	Based on the 1985 novel by Jay Cronley	

=== Acting roles ===
Year	Title	Role	Notes	Ref(s).
1952	Walk East on Beacon	Nicholas Wilben		
1982	The World According to Garp	Pilot	Uncredited	

== Television ==
Year	Title	Director	Writer	Executive producer	Notes	Ref.
1953–1956	Kraft Television Theatre	Yes	Yes	No	Episodes: "My Brother's Keeper", Keep Our Honor Bright, "Eleven O'Clock Flight", "The Devil as a Roaring Lion", "Good Old Charlie Faye", "A Night to Remember"	
1954	Ponds Theater	Yes	No	No	Episode: "Time of the Drought"	
1955	Lux Video Theatre	Yes	No	No	Episodes: "The Creaking Gate", "Not All Your Tears", "The Happy Man"	
1956–1957	The Kaiser Aluminum Hour	Yes	No	No	Episodes: "Man on the White Horse", "Carnival", and "A Real Fine Cutting Edge"	
1957–1959	Playhouse 90	Yes	No	No	Episodes: "The Helen Morgan Story" (1957), "The Last Clear Chance" (1958), "Child of Our Time" (1958), and "Judgment at Nuremberg" (1959).	
1958	The Seven Lively Arts	Yes	No	No	Episode: "Blast at Centralia No. 5"	

=== Acting roles ===
Year	Title	Role	Notes	Ref.
1951–1952	Lux Video Theatre	Mark, Dan, George	Episodes: "The Doctor's Wife", "Man at Bay", "Masquerade"	
1953	Kraft Television Theatre	News Commentator	Episodes: "My Brother's Keeper", "Keep Our Honor Bright"	
1954	Ponds Theater		Episode: "Deliver Me from Evil"	

== Stage ==
Year	Title	Director	Writer	Actor	Ref.
1948	Biography	Yes	No	No	
1957	Look Homeward, Angel	Yes	No	No	
1959	The Gang's All Here	Yes	No	No	
1960	Period of Adjustment	Yes	No	No	
1961	Moon on a Rainbow Shawl	Yes	No	No	
