= Toys in the Attic =

Toys in the Attic is a euphemism for insanity; it may also refer to:

- Toys in the Attic (play), a play by Lillian Hellman
- Toys in the Attic (1963 film), the film adaptation of the Hellman play
- Toys in the Attic (2009 film), a stop-motion family film
- Toys in the Attic (album), a 1975 album by American band Aerosmith
  - "Toys in the Attic" (song), the title track from the album
- "Toys in the attic", a famous line from Pink Floyd song "The Trial"
- "Toys in the Attic", a song by the Dutch band Omnia
- "Toys in the Attic", an episode of Rugrats
- "Toys in the Attic", an episode of the anime series Cowboy Bebop
- The Mask: Toys in the Attic, a 1998 comic book limited series published by Dark Horse Comics
