= Sharon Gans =

American actress and cult leader (1935–2021)

Sharon Gans Horn
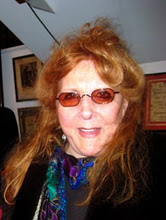
- Born: July 29, 1935; New York, New York, U.S.
- Died: January 22, 2021 (aged 85); New York, New York, U.S.
- Occupations: Stage and film actress and alleged cult leader

Sharon Gans (July 29, 1935–January 22, 2021) was an American actress and cult leader.

Gans grew up in the Bronx New York. She is best known for playing the role of Billy Pilgrim's wife, Valencia Merble, in George Roy Hill's 1972 film version of Kurt Vonnegut's Slaughterhouse-Five. Gans also starred in the award-winning documentary Artists and Orphans: A True Drama. In 1966, she won an Obie Award for Best Actress for her performance in Soon Jack November.

== Career ==
In October 1988, Gans directed the play The Legend of Sharon Shashanovah, presented at the 47th Street Theater in New York City. Gans co-wrote A Chekhov Concert with Jordan Charney that was performed by the Moscow Contemporary Theater.

Gans was a party to the 1978 US Supreme Court case called Kulko v. California Superior Court in which the Court held that Gans had no right to sue her ex-husband for child support while she remained in California and he in New York; the case authored by Justice Marshall describes the facts surrounding the Gans/Kulko marriage in some detail.

== Cult allegations ==
Gans, and her late husband Alex Horn, founded and operated a "school" of the Fourth Way which some former students have asserted is actually a cult but which Gans had vehemently disputed. In December 1978, it was reported that Gans and Horn operated a theatre company in San Francisco where members accused Gans and Horn of brainwashing and violence. One former member of their group in New York, recounted specific allegations of public humiliation, forced labor, private adoptions, and ostracizing of former members.

In 2002, Jeannette Walls reported that Gans, who starred in the documentary film Artists and Orphans: A True Drama which had just been nominated for an Academy Award, had come under fire for various controversial practices, including attempts to force gay men to change their sexual orientation. Rosie O'Donnell, who had narrated the documentary, demanded to have her voice removed, claiming on her show that she did not know the connection between the film and Gans. "What is my luck that of all the theater groups in the world, the one I pick would be a cult?," she stated on her show.

Gans died on January 22, 2021.

In July 2022, Manhattan Cult Story: My Unbelievable True Story of Sex, Crimes, Chaos and Survival was published by Arcade Publishing. Written by Spencer Schneider, it recounts his 23 years as a member of the Gans group.
