= Alexander Horn (disambiguation) =

Alexander Horn (1762–1820) was a Scottish Benedictine monk and secret agent.

Alexander Horn may also refer to:

- Alex Horn (1929–2007), cult leader, playwright and actor
- Alexander horn, a musical instrument
- Alexander horned sphere, a mathematical concept
- Alexander Horne, Governor of the Isle of Man 1713–1723
- Alex Horne (born 1978), British comedian
- Horns of Alexander, a mythological motif associated with Alexander the Great
