= Jennifer on My Mind =

1971 film by Noel Black

- theatrical poster
- Directed by: Noel Black
- Screenplay by: Erich Segal
- Based on: Heir by Roger L. Simon
- Produced by: Bernard Schwartz
- Starring: Michael Brandon; Tippy Walker
- Cinematography: Andrew Laszlo
- Edited by: John W. Wheeler
- Music by: Stephen J. Lawrence
- Production companies: Bernard Schwartz Productions; Joseph M. Schenck Productions
- Distributed by: United Artists
- Release date: November 10, 1971
- Running time: 90 minutes
- Country: United States
- Language: English

Jennifer on My Mind is a 1971 American comedy-drama film based on the 1968 novel Heir by Roger L. Simon. It is directed by Noel Black from a screenplay by Erich Segal, stars Michael Brandon and Tippy Walker, and features Robert De Niro in a minor role.

This is one of the many early-1970s films dealing with addiction following the explosion of recreational drug use in the 1960s.

The premise of the film is centered on Marcus Rottner and Jennifer Da Silva, two wealthy American young adults who meet and fall in love in Venice, Italy. With plenty of money and no real responsibilities or direction in life, the couple begins experimenting with illicit drugs. The film travels through a series of flashbacks showing their progression from marijuana to harder drugs as a result of their complex romantic entanglement.

== Plot ==
Marcus Rottner, 24-year-old heir of his late grandfather Max's fortune, is living in his New Jersey Palisades apartment as he learns that his hippie girlfriend Jennifer Da Silva has died of a heroin overdose in his living room. Fearing that he might be arrested for her death, he decides to dump her body, but not before his sister Selma and her psychologist boyfriend Sergei Wasserman (whom Marcus detests) suddenly visit. They notice his strange behavior and suspect that he has gotten himself into trouble. They search his apartment but find nothing.

A flashback shows how Marcus and Jennifer meet: He first notices Jennifer in Venice, where both are enjoying their holiday. Marcus is immediately drawn to her reckless, careless behavior, and she falls for his looks and charm. She unexpectedly leaves Europe with her parents and he follows her to their home in Oyster Bay, New York, where they briefly date until Jennifer again cuts all ties.

Heartbroken, Marcus leaves for Venice but returns to see Jennifer on her birthday; he is shocked to see that she is injecting heroin with two minstrels. Marcus scares them away and tries to save Jennifer as she, under the influence, jumps from her rooftop.

Fearing that she might become a heroin addict, Marcus convinces Jennifer to return to Venice, but she grows bored and expresses her desire to return to New York. As he visits the Venetian Ghetto, she leaves a recording explaining that she cannot be with him.

He returns to the Lower East Side in Manhattan and meets with his friend Sigmund Ornstein for advice on how to dispose of a body in a novel. Marcus follows his advice and drives to a river. His reverie is interrupted by three Hells Angels who harass him. Their shakedown is interrupted by two police officers on motorcycles. Marcus drives off, dreamily talking of how this is the most time that he has spent with Jenny.

In a flashback, Marcus moves to New Jersey to clear his mind. Months later, Jennifer suddenly arrives on his doorstep, telling Marcus that she has traveled the world and has still not found her place in life. She asks to stay at his place for a while.

As he cooks her dinner, Jennifer secretly puts several prescription capsules into the blender of chocolate milk and drinks the mixture. While he sets the table on the balcony, she freaks out, and he finds her in the kitchen preparing a needle over the stove flame. She climbs up on the balcony railing, but he pulls her down. She asks him to inject the syringe of heroin, and he does, bringing on a fatal overdose.

When a carload of men chase Marcus, his sports car crashes, catches fire and explodes with Jennifer's body in the trunk. He escapes and in the end, he is dressed in white and back in Venice.

== Cast ==
- Michael Brandon as Marcus Rottner
- Tippy Walker as Jennifer Da Silva
- Steve Vinovich as Sigmund Ornstein
- Lou Gilbert as Grandpa Max Rottner
- Chuck McCann as Good Samaritan
- Peter Bonerz as Sergei Wasserman
- Renée Taylor as Selma Rottner
- Bruce Kornbluth as Larry Dolci
- Robert De Niro as Mardigian
- Michael McClanathan as Hell's Angel #1
- Allan F. Nicholls as Hell's Angel #2
- Ralph J. Pinto as Hell's Angel #3
- Barry Bostwick as Minstrel #1
- Jeff Conaway as Minstrel #2
- Nick Lapadula as Motorcycle Cop
- Leib Lensky as Cantor at Synagogue
- Ketti Prosdocimo as Little Girl at Synagogue
- Lino Turchetto as Singing Gondolier
- Rehn Scofield as Hearse Passenger
- Alfredo Michelangeli as Hotel Concierge

== Production ==
A Los Angeles Times reviewer speculated that either Roger L. Simon or Erich Segal was inspired by the true 1966 case of Robert Friede, a 25-year-old Annenberg publishing heir, and Celeste Crenshaw, a drug-addicted 19-year-old socialite whose corpse was found in Friede's car. Friede was the son of Evelyn Annenberg Hall and her first husband Kenneth Friede. Crenshaw and Friede's story is told in the book Turned On: The Friede-Crenshaw Case (1967) by Dick Schaap.

Based on Simon's 1968 novel, the film's working title was Heir. The rights of the novel were initially acquired by Anthony Spinner and Barry Shear in October 1968. In June 1969, it was announced that Herb Jaffe of United Artists was set to produce the film in collaboration with Joseph M. Schenck Enterprises.

Actress Kim Hunter filmed some scenes as Jennifer Da Silva (Tippy Walker)'s mother, but they were cut following a "disastrous preview" in San Francisco that prompted the filmmakers to edit it several times.

The film marks the feature-film debuts for Barry Bostwick and Jeff Conaway. It was shot on location in New York City, Venice and New Jersey.

== Reception ==
The film received generally negative reviews. A reviewer of Variety noted: "The delightfully ridiculous plot, mock-sentimental narration, absurd dialog, infectious syrupy music and intermittent idyllic interludes all parody Love Story. And yet, like Pretty Poison, this is a potpourri of disarming satire, black comedy and poignancy that creates a strangely haunting aura. Michael Brandon, as Marcus, is charmingly boyish and natural. Tippy Walker, as Jennifer, comes across with a bitchy ethereal allure."

== See also ==
- List of American films of 1971
