= A Night to Remember (Kraft Television Theatre) =

1956 TV episode about Titanic

- Kraft Television Theatre episode
- Steerage passenger realise that all the boats are gone
- Episode no.: Season 9 Episode 25
- Directed by: George Roy Hill
- Written by: John Whedon and George Roy Hill (television adaptation), Walter Lord (book)
- Original air date: March 28, 1956

Guest appearances
- Claude Rains, narrator; Patrick Macnee as Thomas Andrews; Clarence Derwent as Capt. Edward J. Smith

Episode chronology
← Previous "The Lost Weekend"	Next → "Paper Foxhole"

"A Night to Remember" was an American television play broadcast live on March 28, 1956, as part of the NBC television series, Kraft Television Theatre. The play was based on Walter Lord's 1955 book, A Night to Remember, depicting the final night of the Titanic. George Roy Hill was the director.

The production was a major hit, attracting 28 million viewers and receiving positive reviews from critics. It was nominated for five Emmy Awards (including best program, best writing, best live camera work, best directing, and best art direction). It won the Emmy for live camera work and also won two Sylvania Television Awards as the year's best television adaptation and for best technical production.

== Plot ==
Narration by Claude Rains tells of an 1898 novel that seemingly presaged the Titanic tragedy and reviewing the history of the Titanic, its size, and capabilities. After the ship begins its voyage on April 10, 1912, the scene switches to April 14. Thomas Andrews, the 39-year-old naval architect who built the Titanic, works in his state room. J. Bruce Ismay, president and managing director of the White Star Line, boasts of plans for a speed run tomorrow morning. Ismay pulls an iceberg warning from his pocket and hands it to the ship's captain, Edward J. Smith; the third warning Smith has received that day.

The Salon Orchestra plays as Smith dines with the first-class passengers. At 7:30 p.m., the captain receives a fourth warning of icebergs in the ship's path. Four decks below, 712 souls travel in steerage. A young Irish couple performs a jig. In the wireless room, at 9:30 p.m., another ice warning places the Titanic directly within the area of danger. Wireless operator Jack Phillips is distracted by stacks of messages passengers wish to send. At 10 p.m., Smith retires to his cabin. At 10:30 p.m., the SS Californian spots an ice field and stops its engines to wait until morning before proceeding. At 11 p.m., the wire operator on the Californian sends a warning to other ships. Phillips is annoyed by the message and replies, "Shut up. Shut up. I'm busy." In the first class smoking room, a small group remains, but otherwise quiet settles over the ship.

In the crow's nest, an iceberg is spotted directly ahead. A warning is sent to stop the engine, then full astern, and the emergency doors are sealed. The Titanic strikes the iceberg. A number of passengers gather on the deck and discover pieces of the iceberg. Smith returns to the bridge and learns that the ship is taking on water. At 11:55 p.m., Andrews describes the damage to Smith and Ismay: The ship has suffered a 300-foot gash and will sink in no more than two hours. Smith orders the lifeboats readied and the passengers mustered and no general alarm to be sounded so as to avoid panic. Ismay is aware that the Titanic has only 16 lifeboats and four collapsibles, enough to hold only 1,000 of the 3,000 persons on board.

Smith directs Phillips to send out a distress call. The wire operator on the nearby Californian is off duty and does not receive the call. Titanic's distress message is picked up on the roof of a New York Department store by radio operator David Sarnoff. Noted to the Californian in the distance, Smith orders the firing of rockets. Crew members aboard the Californian see the rockets and note the Titanic listing. Captain Lord of the Californian is notified but just orders them to contact with the morse lamp and goes back to sleep. At 12:36 a.m., a ship replies to the Titanic's distress call, but it is 58 miles away and will arrive too late.

In third class, the passengers are told there is no danger but that they should put on life jackets. The ship begins to list. At 12:15, the covers are removed from the lifeboats, and women and children begin boarding. At 12:42 a.m., the first life boat is lowered with only 20 persons, despite having a capacity of 40 persons. Another lifeboat is lowered with only 12 passengers.

The Salon Orchestra continues to play as the crew continues firing rockets with no response from the Californian. On one side of the ship, only women and children are permitted on the lifeboats. On other side, the rule is relaxed, and Henry Harper boards a lifeboat with his prize Pekingese dog. An elderly couple, Mr. and Mrs. Isidore Strauss, refuse to be separated and remain on board. Lifeboats continue to be lowered. At 1:30, an officer fires his gun to control entry onto the lifeboats. At 1:46 a.m., Ismay takes a spot in one of the last boats. Claude Rains, who narrated throughout the telecast, intones, "At the time President Ismay left his ship, there remained on board 1,643 passengers, among them 168 women and 57 children". A small group of women and children had been allowed to evacuate earlier, the remaining steerage passengers were finally permitted to head to the deck shortly before 2 a.m. The final lifeboat is lowered at 2:05 a.m.

The captain gives leave for the wireless operators to abandon their posts with the directive "every man for himself." At 2:15 a.m., the orchestra, directed by Wallace Henry Hartley, plays its final piece, the Episcopal hymn "Autumn". Many passengers jump into the freezing water in their life preservers. Andrews, making no attempt to escape, is killed by a falling chandelier as the ship sinks at 2:20 a.m. with 1,502 souls, including many children from steerage.

Rains closes his narration by reviewing the iceberg warnings that were not heeded, the lack of sufficient lifeboats, and the failure of the Californian to respond to the Titanic's pleas. Rains closes with the words: "Never again has man been quite so confident. An age had come to an end."

== Cast ==
The production included a cast of 107 actors, 72 with speaking parts. Individual credits identifying the parts played were not provided either on screen or in advance press releases. On-screen credits simply listed the cast in order of appearance as follows:

- Claude Rains [narrator]

Officers and crew of the Titanic

- Clarence Derwent [as Capt. Edward J. Smith]
- Don Marley
- Eric Micklewood
- Roger Evans Boxill
- Richard Newton
- David Cole
- Victor Thorley
- William Becker
- John Heldabrand
- Frank Leslie
- John Wynne Evans
- Peter Forster
- Stanley Lemin
- Dermot McNamara
- Leonard Stone
- Robert Brown
- Neil North [as Second Officer Charles Lightoller]
- Roger Hamilton

First class passengers

- Millette Alexander [as Mrs. Astor]
- Peter Pagan
- Anthony Kemble Cooper
- Cavada Humphrey
- Joanna Roos
- Edgar Stehli [as Mr. Strauss]
- Valerie Cossart
- John Boruff
- Patrick Macnee [as Thomas Andrews]
- Woodrow Parfrey
- Ruth Matteson
- Tom Charles
- Jerome Kilty
- Larry Gates
- Peter Turgeon
- Clifford David
- Geoffrey Horne
- Wesley Lau
- Hugh Dunne
- Margo Lorenz
- June Evert
- Alfreda Wallace
- Frank Schofield
- Guy Sorel
- Mary K. Wells
- Al Markim
- Elizabeth Eustia
- Jim Lanphier
- Jean Cameron
- Roger Plowden
- Dorothy Rice
- Ellen Clark

Third class passengers

- Sandy Ackland
- Helena Carroll
- Liam Gannon
- Svea Grunfeld
- Michael Ingram
- Gina Petrushka
- Herman Schwedt
- Walter Burke
- Dan Morgan
- Michael Gorrin

Stewards

- Marcel Hillaire
- John Mackwood
- Basil Howes
- Victor Wood
- Chrisse Hayward
- Drew Thompson
- George Cathrey

Officers and crew, SS Californian

- Frederick Tozere [as Capt. Stanley Lord]
- Roy Dean
- Tom Martin
- Bradford Dillman
- Norman Morris

Other passengers on Titanic

- Helen Ludlam
- Gertrude Dallas
- Elinor Wright
- Laura Prikovits
- Kate Wilkinson
- Erlamond Trexler
- Anita Webb
- Billie Boldt
- Ann Chisholm
- Denise Morris
- Lydia Shaffer
- Claudia Crawford
- Eddie Applegate
- Cornelius Frizzell
- James Pritchett
- Mort Thompson
- Arthur Joseph
- Jeanne Palmer
- Jonathan Anderson
- Joe Hardy
- Ulla Kazanova
- Elizabeth Dewing
- Katherine Hynes
- Mary Brown
- Mavis Neal
- Diana Kemble
- Martine Bartlett
- Christine Linn
- Emile Belasco
- Patricia Carlisle
- Remo Pisani
- Patti Bosworth
- Merle Ashley

== Production ==
In addition to 107 actors, the production used 31 studio sets, making it "the most complex live television show ever attempted." According to NBC, the production budget was only $85,000.

George Roy Hill was the director. The production was based on Walter Lord's 1955 book, A Night to Remember. The story was adapted for television by George Roy Hill and John Whedon (grandfather of Joss Whedon). The art director, Duane McKinney, was responsible for design of the 31 sets. He described the set's replica of the Titanic's iconic Grand Staircase as being 50 feet (15 m) wide and 20 feet (6.1 m) high. McKinney said that six cameras were used in the production, plus two in reserve. One of the ship's boiler rooms was in a tank with 2 feet (61 cm) of water and a corridor had water 4 feet (120 cm) deep. The large tanks had catwalks out of camera range for the actors to use, he said. The production was staged at NBC's Brooklyn Studios. The music was composed and conducted by Wladimir Selinsky.

On March 28, 1956, the production was broadcast nationwide on NBC as part of the long-running anthology series, Kraft Television Theatre. The program was a major hit, attracting 28 million viewers and increasing sales of Lord's book. It was rerun on kinescope on May 2, 1956, five weeks after its first broadcast.

=== Awards ===
The program was nominated in five categories at the 9th Primetime Emmy Awards: best single program of the year; best teleplay writing (George Roy Hill and John Whedon); best direction (George Roy Hill); best live camera work; and best art direction (Duane McKinney). It won the Emmy for live camera work.

It also won two Sylvania Television Awards, as the year's best television adaptation and also for best technical production.

== Reception ==
The production received positive reviews from critics.

In The New York Times, Jack Gould called it "technically brilliant", "a triumph", and "an extraordinary demonstration of staging technique that imparted a magnificent sense of physical dimension to the home screen." In addition to the "sheer magnitude and complexity" of the production, Gould also praised the "emotional tension and terrifying suspense" that were well sustained through the broadcast.

In The Boston Globe, Mary Cremmen called it "bitterly graphic" with an impact that "made a viewer wide-eyed with fear." She praised the production's pacing and its restraint in relying on suspense rather than the "screams and gushing water and crashing chandeliers" that characterized prior dramatizations of the Titanic's sinking.

Syndicated television critic John Crosby called it a "splendid" production and "an undertaking of great courage". He praised the sets depicting the ship's complicated innards as "done so well that we suddenly were practically on the ship". As a fan of live television, Crosby called it "a particularly happy event" in demonstrating the medium's capabilities.

In the New York Daily News, Ben Gross called it "a moving drama of courage and cowardice", "a TV show to remember", and one of the rare occasions when television departed from the road of mediocrity and proved that "TV occasionally can rise to great heights". He admired the "dignity and restraint" exercised in telling the tragic story "without indulging in the slightest sensationalism". He also praised the "air of authenticity" in the 31 sets, creating the illusion of being aboard the ship. He found the documentary, factual approach enhanced the "almost unbearable emotional impact".

The original airing earned a 28.9 Trendex rating, and the repeat airing earned an 18.9 Trendex rating.

== See also ==
- George Roy Hill filmography
- List of films about the RMS Titanic
- RMS Titanic in popular culture
