= Artists and Orphans: A True Drama =

2001 film by Lianne Klapper McNally

- Directed by: Lianne Klapper McNally
- Starring: Sharon Gans
- Narrated by: Rosie O'Donnell
- Edited by: Ellen Goldwasser, Jonathan Kohen
- Music by: Peter Fish
- Production company: Not By Chance Productions Inc.
- Distributed by: CS Associates
- Release date: 2001
- Running time: 40 minutes
- Countries: United States; Georgia
- Language: English

Artists and Orphans: A True Drama (known in Russian as Артисты и сироты: Настоящая драма) is a 2001 American documentary film documenting a group of American artists traveling to the Republic of Georgia for an art festival, and their subsequent effort to provide humanitarian aid to a group of local orphans. Directed and written by Lianne Klapper McNally, upon its debut in 2001, the Daily Nexus described it as "heart-wrenching and eventually heart-warming," as well as "short, gritty and brilliantly scored." The film won Audience Choice Award for Best Documentary at the Santa Barbara International Film Festival, and it was nominated for Best Documentary Short Subject at the 74th Academy Awards. Artists and Orphans had won multiple film festival awards by 2002, debuting on television several months later through WE tv.

== Synopsis ==
Artists and Orphans, a short documentary details a group of American artists traveling to the Republic of Georgia after an invitation to take part in an international arts festival. Upon discovering that the country is undergoing a humanitarian crisis, the troupe is introduced to a group of orphans living in Tbilisi, Georgia, who were surviving extreme deprivation in a mental hospital bombed out in the Georgian civil war. With winter approaching, the film documents the artists' attempt to gather funds and supplies for the makeshift orphanage, which lacked heating, food, electricity, and water. They then help prepare the orphanage for winter.

== Production ==
Not By Chance Productions, Inc. served as the production company behind the film. Post-production facilities were provided in major part by Teatown Communications Group in New York, while Ellen Goldwasser and Jonathan "Yoni" Kohen edited the film.

== Release ==
=== Debut and first awards (2001) ===
Released in early 2001 and initially making the rounds on the American film festival circuit, in March 2001 Artists and Orphans won the Audience Choice Award for documentaries at the Santa Barbara International Film Festival. The Lake Arrowhead International Film Festival in Lake Arrowhead, California screened the film in May 2001, with the film winning the Inspiration Award for Best Documentary. In June 2001, the film screened at the Palm Springs International Festival of Short Films. Also that month the film won the audience award for Best Short Film at the Florida Film Festival. Artists and Orphans played at the Karlovy Vary International Film Festival in July 2001, and in September it screened at the Boston Film Festival, with the Boston Phoenix describing it as the "standout" in its round of screenings. At the Docside Film Festival in San Antonio in April 2002, the film was nominated for Best Feature Documentary.

=== Oscar nomination (2001–2002) ===
The film was nominated for an Oscar at the 74th Academy Awards for Best Documentary Short Subject. Also nominated were Sing! and Thoth, with the latter winning the award in February 2002. On March 18, 2001, the film was one of two runners up for Best Documentary at the Valleyfest Film Festival in Knoxville, Tennessee. In March 2002, the press reported that Rosie O'Donnell was seeking to remove her narration from the production after accusations of racial discrimination and homophobia (including the sanctioning of conversion therapy) by Gans and the filmmakers, which they dismissed as "inflammatory" and "without foundation."

However, Gans' Fourth Way-inspired esoteric initiatory order (known colloquially among its members as "The Work" or "School" before incorporating as the Odyssey Study Group at the turn of the century) has since been deemed a "cult" by former member Spencer Schneider, who corroborated the previous accusations in Manhattan Cult Story, his 2022 memoir. Rick Ross, a New Jersey–based cult expert and lecturer who helped deprogram Branch Davidians in the mid-'90s, said the group is a cult and excludes members of the LGBT community. "They must renounce their sexual preference and work toward becoming heterosexual," said Ross, who said he spent hours talking with former members. On April 22, 2002, the film screened on WE tv as part of an evening of programming meant to raise awareness for children. It was screened in the Czech Republic on April 23, 2002, at the Olomouc Animation Film Festival, and was also included in documentaries for sale at the International Documentary Film Festival Amsterdam. At the Crested Butte Reel Fest in central Colorado, the film won the Illumination Award for the film, and Artists and Orphans also tied for second place for audience choice award.

== Critical reception ==
Andy Sywak of the Daily Nexus gave the film a positive review upon its March 2001 debut, describing it as "heart-wrenching and eventually heart-warming." Though Sywak argued the film "appears pretentious" at times by attempting to draw connections between art and humanitarian relief, he further opined that the film was "essentially a documentary about a philanthropy mission," and "the fact that the caregivers are artists ultimately has little to do with the story."

== Awards and nominations ==
Incomplete list of awards for Artists and Orphans
Year	Award	Nominated work	Category	Result
2001	Santa Barbara; International Film Festival	Artists and Orphans	Audience Choice Award for Best Documentary	Won
2001	Lake Arrowhead; International Film Festival	Artists and Orphans	Inspiration Award for Best Documentary	Won
2001	Florida Film Festival	Artists and Orphans	Audience Award for Best Short Film	Won
2001	74th Academy Awards	Artists and Orphans	Best Documentary Short Subject	Nominated
2002	Docside Film Festival	Artists and Orphans	The Jury Award	Nominated
2002	Valleyfest Film Festival	Artists and Orphans	Best Documentary	Runner-Up
2002	Crested Butte Reel Fest	Artists and Orphans	Illumination Award	Won
2002	Crested Butte Reel Fest	Artists and Orphans	Audience Choice Award	2nd place

== See also ==
- List of documentary films
- List of American films of 2001
