= Merrie Spaeth =

American consultant and actress (born 1948)

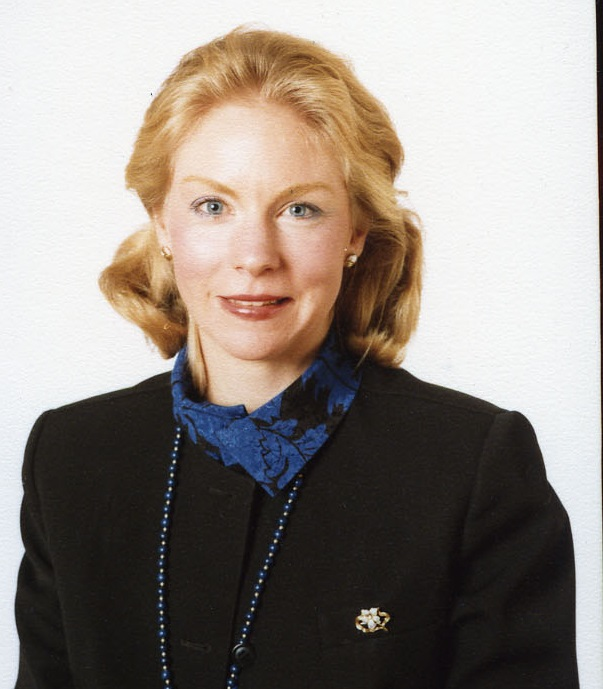
- Spaeth while working at the White House in 1984

White House Director of Media Relations
- In office 1983–1985
- President: Ronald Reagan

Personal details
- Born: Merrie Marcia Spaeth; August 23, 1948 (age 78)
- Party: Republican
- Spouse(s): S. Thanhauser Jr. (m. 1973, divorced) Tex Lezar (m. 1984; died 2004)
- Education: Smith College (BA); Columbia University (MBA)

Merrie Marcia Spaeth (born August 23, 1948) is an American public relations and political consultant.

== Early life and education ==
Spaeth is the daughter of Dr. Philip G. Spaeth and Marcia Ryan Spaeth. She attended Germantown Friends School in Philadelphia. In 1970, Spaeth graduated with honors from Smith College and later earned an MBA from Columbia Business School, where she graduated cum laude.

== Career ==
At the age of 15 in 1964, Spaeth was cast to play Marian "Gil" Gilbert in The World of Henry Orient.

Between 1970 and 1978, Spaeth wrote for numerous print publications and was a reporter for several local television stations. Additionally, Spaeth was a speechwriter for William S. Paley, founder and chairman of CBS. In 1978 Spaeth hosted and produced a nightly television show in Columbus, Ohio, for Warner-Amex Cable. In 1979, Spaeth was a producer for 20/20, where she produced segments on Liberace, gifted children and motorcycle gangs.

In the early 1980s, Spaeth was accepted to the White House Fellows program where she was assigned to work under FBI Director William Webster as his special assistant, after which she worked for two years as director of public affairs for the Federal Trade Commission. In 1983, she became White House Director of Media Relations in the administration of Ronald Reagan, serving until 1985.

After moving to Dallas with her husband, Spaeth founded Spaeth Communications in 1987. Starting in the 1990s, Spaeth currently teaches BLC (business leadership center) seminar classes at the Cox School of Business at SMU.

=== Swift Boat Veterans for Truth ===
During the 2004 presidential campaign, Spaeth advised the Swift Boat Veterans for Truth, a group that questioned the Democratic presidential candidate John Kerry’s Vietnam War record. Since the 2004 election, the term "Swift Boating" (or "swiftboating") has become a common expression for a campaign attacking opponents by questioning their credibility and patriotism in a dishonest manner. The term is most often used with the pejorative meaning of a smear campaign. Spaeth has referred to her involvement in this campaign as her “biggest regret.”

=== Work with Ken Starr ===
Spaeth was hired as a communications consultant to Ken Starr, an attorney who served as Solicitor General of the United States under George H. W. Bush and Special prosecutor for the Whitewater controversy during the Clinton Administration. Starr was then serving as President of Baylor University during the Baylor University sexual assault scandal. As president, Starr had received email messages from a female student who claimed that she had been raped, though he later denied receiving the messages. In a television interview with KWTX-TV, Spaeth was present and periodically stopped the interview to coach Starr on his answers about the controversy.

=== Work for Jeffrey Epstein ===
In 2008, Spaeth helped Jeffrey Epstein pen a letter of apology, as he was under investigation for sex trafficking minors. Epstein and Spaeth communicated over the span of a few weeks in relation to the apology letter. When asked in 2025 about the nature of her work for Epstein, Spaeth said, "I ultimately terminated the engagement because of my discomfort with it."

However, after further records were released from the Epstein files in 2025 and January 2026, it was revealed that Spaeth continued contacting Epstein for years after his guilty plea in order to offer to provide further services. One statement among those communications that was attributed to Spaeth was "We're here if you want help. We think the world of you." When confronted with the disparity of her earlier statements about terminating engagement with Epstein versus the revelation that she had repeatedly attempted to engage in further work for him, Spaeth said that she was embarrassed in light of the scope of Epstein's activities.

== Publications ==
Spaeth contributed to the Illinois Department of Commerce and Economic Opportunity from 2006 to 2010 writing columns on executive communication. Additionally, Spaeth has written for HR Executive, PRWeek, Bank Marketing, Public Diplomacy, Modern Healthcare, PRSA Strategist, and The Philadelphia Inquirer. She has written three books: Marketplace Communication, Words Matter, and You Don’t Say!

== Personal life ==
Spaeth was previously married to Robert S. Thanhauser Jr. In 1984, she married "Tex" Lezar, who served as a counselor to William French Smith and later as United States Assistant Attorney General for the Office of Legal Policy. They have three children. Lezar died on January 5, 2004. Spaeth resides in Dallas, Texas and is a Republican.

In 2023, Spaeth was a recipient of the Inkpot Award at the annual San Diego Comic Con.
