= Marjorie Fowler =

American film editor (1920–2003)

- Born: Marjorie Johnson; July 16, 1920
- Died: July 8, 2003 (aged 82); Hollywood Hills, California, United States
- Occupation: film editor
- Spouse: Gene Fowler Jr.
- Parent: Nunnally Johnson
- Relatives: Nora Johnson (sister)

Marjorie Johnson Fowler (July 16, 1920 – July 8, 2003) was an American film editor. She was nominated for the Academy Award for Best Film Editing in 1968 for Doctor Dolittle.

She was the daughter of the screenwriter Nunnally Johnson, and sister of the novelist Nora Johnson.

She was married to editor Gene Fowler Jr. until his death in 1998. On May 12, 1964, they were both the first man and woman to respectively get top honors at American Cinema Editors. Fowler became secretary while her husband became president. She later won a Lifetime Career Achievement award by American Cinema Editors in 2000. She died in her sleep on July 16, 2003.

== Selected filmography ==
Based on Fowler's filmography at the Internet Movie Database.

Editor
Year	Film	Director	Notes
1944	The Woman in the Window	Fritz Lang	
1948	Mr. Peabody and the Mermaid	Irving Pichel	
1953	Man Crazy	Irving Lerner	
1953	Man in the Attic	Hugo Fregonese	
1956	Crime of Passion	Gerd Oswald	Second collaboration with Gerd Oswald
1957	Oh, Men! Oh, Women!	Nunnally Johnson	First collaboration with Nunnally Johnson
1957	The Three Faces of Eve	Nunnally Johnson	Second collaboration with Nunnally Johnson
1957	Stopover Tokyo	Richard L. Breen	
1958	Fräulein	Henry Koster	First collaboration with Henry Koster
1958	Separate Tables	Delbert Mann	First collaboration with Delbert Mann
1959	The Man Who Understood Women	Nunnally Johnson	Third collaboration with Nunnally Johnson
1960	Elmer Gantry	Richard Brooks	
1961	Lover Come Back	Delbert Mann	Second collaboration with Delbert Mann
1961	The Outsider	Delbert Mann	Third collaboration with Delbert Mann
1962	Mr. Hobbs Takes a Vacation	Henry Koster	Second collaboration with Henry Koster
1962	40 Pounds of Trouble	Norman Jewison	
1963	Take Her, She's Mine	Henry Koster	Third collaboration with Henry Koster
1964	What a Way to Go!	J. Lee Thompson	First collaboration with J. Lee Thompson
1965	Dear Brigitte	Henry Koster	Fourth collaboration with Henry Koster
1967	Doctor Dolittle	Richard Fleischer	
1969	Once You Kiss a Stranger	Robert Sparr	
1970	The Strawberry Statement	Stuart Hagmann	
1972	Conquest of the Planet of the Apes	J. Lee Thompson	Second collaboration with J. Lee Thompson
1980	It's My Turn	Claudia Weill	

Editorial department
Year	Film	Director	Role	Notes
1956	The Brass Legend	Gerd Oswald	Editorial supervisor	First collaboration with Gerd Oswald
1956	Crime of Passion	Gerd Oswald	Supervising editor	

TV movies

Editor
Year	Film	Director
1971	The Homecoming: A Christmas Story	Fielder Cook
1973	The Girls of Huntington House	Alf Kjellin
1973	The Blue Knight	Robert Butler
1975	The Runaways	Harry Harris
1975	Returning Home	Daniel Petrie
1977	The Prince of Central Park	Harvey Hart
1981	The Marva Collins Story	Peter Levin
1982	Washington Mistress	Peter Levin
1984	Family Secrets	Jack Hofsiss
1985	Evergreen	Fielder Cook

Writer
Year	Film	Director
1982	A Wedding on Walton's Mountain	Lee Philips

TV pilots

Editor
Year	Film	Director
1977	Bunco	Alexander Singer
1980	Joshua's World	Peter Levin

TV series

Editor
Year	Title	Notes
1956−58	Death Valley Days	4 episodes
1958	Sky King	1 episode
1961	Follow the Sun	2 episodes
1974	Doc Elliot	1 episode
1977	Eight Is Enough	3 episodes
1972−77	The Waltons	40 episodes
1978−80	Family	7 episodes
1985	Evergreen	3 episodes

Editorial department
Year	Title	Role	Notes
1954	The New Adventures of China Smith	Supervising editor	15 episodes

Writer
Year	Title	Notes
1981	The Waltons	1 episode
