= Tippy Walker =

American actress

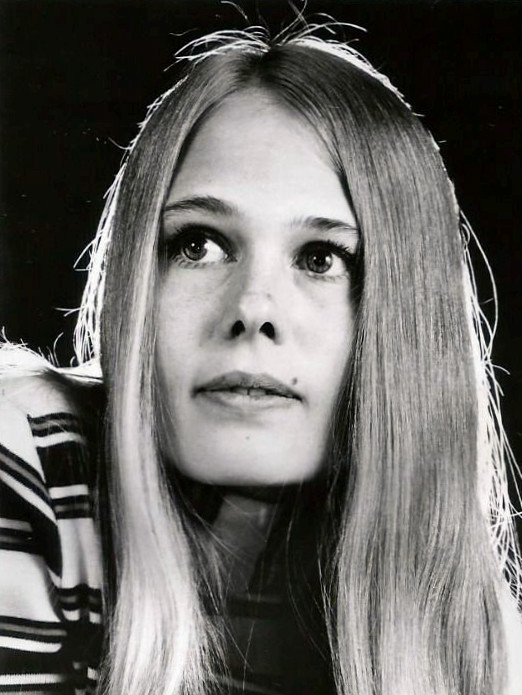
- Walker as part of the Peyton Place cast, 1969
- Born: Elizabeth Tipton Walker; February 19, 1947 (age 79); New York City, New York, U.S.
- Occupations: actress, art gallery owner
- Years active: 1964–1972
- Relatives: Zachary Taylor (great-great-great grandfather)

Elizabeth Tipton Walker (born February 19, 1947) is an American former actress, best known for her role in the film The World of Henry Orient (1964).

== Early years ==
Walker was born Elizabeth Tipton Walker on February 19, 1947, in New York City. Her father, Gordon Walker, was an engineer with Allied Chemical Corporation. Her mother, Nancy, was trustee of a society involved in restoring colonial homes. She was raised in Westchester County, New York, and attended The Masters School in Dobbs Ferry, New York. President Zachary Taylor was her great-great-great grandfather.

== Career ==
Walker appeared in several television shows, such as Dr. Kildare and Peyton Place, and the female lead role in the film Jennifer on My Mind. She asked producers to bill her as Elizabeth Walker on Peyton Place, partly "because I don't like strangers calling me Tippy".

== Personal life ==
In 1968 Walker was engaged to David Milch, a Yale graduate who planned to be a writer.

According to a 2012 article in The New Yorker by John Colapinto, director George Roy Hill handpicked Walker from hundreds of actresses who auditioned for the role of "Val" in the 1964 film The World of Henry Orient and reshaped the film during editing to focus more on her character. According to Colapinto, in the 2000s Walker revealed through a series of posts on IMDb that she and Hill began a relationship during filming that lasted throughout most of Walker's senior year in high school, even though Hill was married with children and, at age 44, nearly 30 years older than Walker. In the posts Colapinto attributes to Walker, the retired actress describes being aggressively French-kissed by Hill as a 16-year-old while they were alone in his office. Walker also claimed that Hill swore her to secrecy about the resulting relationship, then himself told others, and she states the resulting Hollywood gossip made potential employers reluctant to cast her, contributing to her decision to stop acting in the early 1970s.

== Filmography ==
- The World of Henry Orient (1964) – Valerie Boyd
- The Jesus Trip (1971) – Anna
- Jennifer on My Mind (1971) – Jenny

=== Television ===
- Dr. Kildare (4 episodes, 1965) – Lois Gibbon
- ABC Stage 67 (1 episode, 1966) – Virginia Otis
- Peyton Place (79 episodes, 1968–1969) – Carolyn Russell
- Seven in Darkness (1969) – Christine Rohas
- The Sixth Sense (later edited for syndication to become part of The Night Gallery by Rod Serling) (1 episode, 1972) – Julie Desmond (final television appearance)
