= Slaughterhouse-Five (film) =

1972 American film directed by George Roy Hill

- Original film poster
- Directed by: George Roy Hill
- Written by: Stephen Geller
- Based on: Slaughterhouse-Five; 1969 novel by Kurt Vonnegut
- Produced by: Paul Monash
- Starring: Michael Sacks; Ron Leibman; Valerie Perrine
- Cinematography: Miroslav Ondříček
- Edited by: Dede Allen
- Music by: Glenn Gould
- Production companies: Vanadas Productions, Inc.
- Distributed by: Universal Pictures
- Release date: March 15, 1972
- Running time: 104 minutes
- Country: United States
- Language: English

Slaughterhouse-Five is a 1972 American comedy-drama military science fiction film directed by George Roy Hill and produced by Paul Monash, from a screenplay by Stephen Geller, based on the 1969 novel of the same name by Kurt Vonnegut. The film stars Michael Sacks as Billy Pilgrim, who is "unstuck in time" and has no control over where he is going next. It also stars Ron Leibman as Paul Lazzaro and Valerie Perrine in her film debut as Montana Wildhack.

Slaughterhouse-Five premiered at the 25th Cannes Film Festival, where it won the Jury Prize and was nominated for the Palme d'Or. The film also won a Hugo Award for Best Dramatic Presentation and the inaugural Saturn Award for Best Science Fiction Film. Sacks was nominated for a Golden Globe Award for Most Promising Newcomer – Male for his portrayal of Pilgrim.

Vonnegut wrote about the film soon after its release, in his preface to Between Time and Timbuktu: "I love George Roy Hill and Universal Pictures, who made a flawless translation of my novel Slaughterhouse-Five to the silver screen. I drool and cackle every time I watch that film, because it is so harmonious with what I felt when I wrote the book."

== Plot ==
In Ilium, New York, the middle-aged Billy Pilgrim writes a letter to the editor claiming to have become "unstuck in time"; he finds himself as a young man behind enemy lines in Belgium during World War II, where he and some other American troops are captured by the Germans. A fellow prisoner of war, Paul Lazzaro, develops a grudge against Billy and vows to kill him; at a camp, Lazzaro attacks Billy but is intercepted by an older POW, Edgar Derby. Billy and Derby develop a friendship. The Americans are set to be transferred to Dresden for the duration of the war and are asked to elect a leader. When Lazzaro nominates himself, Billy nominates Derby for the role, and Derby is acclaimed after Lazzaro steps down. In Dresden, the POWs are placed in a slaughterhouse, Slaughterhouse-Five. During dinner, sirens sound off and the POWs head to shelter; the firebombing of Dresden commences, during which Billy believes 100,000 perish. The POWs emerge and the Germans have them sort through the ruins for survivors, warning looting will be punished. When Derby discovers a dancing figurine, he pockets it, and is executed by a Nazi firing squad.

After the war, Billy marries the wealthy Valencia, whose father owns an optometry school, and Billy goes into the field. They have two children, Robert and Barbara. Robert becomes a troubled adolescent, at one point caught by the police vandalizing a Catholic cemetery. Billy bribes the police into letting Robert go. Billy and his father-in-law Lionel Merble board a private plane for an optometry convention. When Billy looks out the window and sees men in ski masks, he has a premonition the plane will crash en route, which it does. Lionel is killed but Billy is found alive and taken to hospital. On her way to the hospital, a distressed Valencia has multiple accidents and her car's exhaust is destroyed, causing her to die of carbon monoxide poisoning.

Billy is released from the hospital and opts to live alone, over the objections of Barbara. Robert has reformed and enlisted for the Vietnam War. While alone, Billy is abducted to the alien planet of Tralfamadore, along with film actress Montana Wildhack. The Tralfamadorians live in the "fourth dimension" and teach Billy the universe is made up of random moments strung together; when one dies, they go back to another point in their life, and it is up to them to focus on good moments and ignore the bad. The Tralfamadorians hope Billy and Montana will mate. Billy and Montana fall in love and have a child, whom Montana names Billy Jr. On Earth, Billy argues with Barbara about the existence of Tralfamadore; Billy, being able to travel into the future as well as the past, shares a vision of his death, in which he is fatally shot by an elderly Lazzaro while giving a speech about Tralfamadore.

== Cast ==
- Michael Sacks as Billy Pilgrim
- Ron Leibman as Paul Lazzaro
- Eugene Roche as Edgar Derby
- Sharon Gans as Valencia Merble Pilgrim
- Valerie Perrine as Montana Wildhack
- Holly Near as Barbara Pilgrim
- Perry King as Robert Pilgrim
- Kevin Conway as Roland Weary
- Friedrich von Ledebur as German Leader
- Ekkehardt Belle as Young German Guard
- Sorrell Booke as Lionel Merble
- Roberts Blossom as Bob "Wild Bob" Cody
- John Dehner as Professor Rumfoord
- Gary Waynesmith as Stanley
- Richard Schaal as Howard W. Campbell Jr.
- Gilmer McCormick as Lily Rumfoord
- Stan Gottlieb as Hobo
- Karl-Otto Alberty as German Guard - Group Two
- Henry Bumstead as Eliot Rosewater
- Lucille Benson as Billy's Mother
- John Wood as English Officer (credited as Tom Wood)
- Warren Frost as Driver

== Music ==
Slaughterhouse-Five uses 1950s-1960s recordings by Glenn Gould: Bach Concerto #5 in F Minor, BWV 1056, and Concerto #3 in D Major, BWV 1054. These had been recorded at CBS 30th Street Studio with the Columbia Symphony Orchestra. Soundtrack recordings featuring other artists included Rudolf Serkin, piano, with Casals conducting Brandenburg Concerto#4 in G Major, BWV 1049, III Presto. The film used such a small amount of music that the soundtrack album added atmospheric excerpts from Douglas Leedy's synthesized triple album Entropical Paradise.

The prolonged rendition of the final movement of Bach's fourth Brandenburg concerto accompanies a cinematic montage as the main character first encounters the city of Dresden.

No music by cast member Holly Near, a then-experienced singer and songwriter, was used in the film.

== Reception ==
On the review aggregator website Rotten Tomatoes, 82% of 17 critics' reviews are positive. Metacritic, which uses a weighted average, assigned the film a score of 66 out of 100, based on 6 critics, indicating "generally favorable" reviews.

== Awards ==
The film won the Prix du Jury at the 1972 Cannes Film Festival, as well as a Hugo Award and Saturn Award. Both Hill and Geller were nominated for awards by their respective guilds. Sacks was nominated for a Golden Globe.

== See also ==
- George Roy Hill filmography
- List of American films of 1972
