= Homeward Borne =

- Playhouse 90 episode
- Kiley, Eyer and Darnell from "Homeward Borne"
- Episode no.: Season 1 Episode 32
- Directed by: Arthur Hiller
- Written by: Halsted Welles (teleplay), Ruth Chatterton (novel)
- Cinematography by: Gert Andersen
- Original air date: May 9, 1957

Guest appearances
- Richard Kiley as Bob Lyttleton; Linda Darnell as Meg Lyttleton; Keith Andes as Andy Colby

Episode chronology
← Previous "Child of Trouble"	Next → "Helen Morgan"

"Homeward Borne" is an American television film broadcast on May 9, 1957, as part of the CBS television series, Playhouse 90. It is the thirty-second episode of the first season.

== Plot ==
A fighter pilot, Bob Lyttleton, returns home from war. He learns that his wife, Meg, has adopted a war orphan. He resents the child.

== Cast ==
- Richard Kiley as Bob Lyttleton
- Linda Darnell as Meg Lyttleton
- Keith Andes as Andy Colby
- Richard Eyer as Tommy Lyttleton
- Rene Korper as Ben
- Sarah Selby as Secretary
- Pauline Myers as Louise
- Steve Firstman as Paul

== Production ==
The film was based on Ruth Chatterton's 1950 novel Homeward Borne.

Arthur Hiller was the director. Halsted Welles wrote the teleplay based Chatterton's novel. Gert Andersen was the director of photography, and Robert Swanson was the editor. The film was produced by Screen Gems for Playhouse 90.
