= The Kaiser Aluminum Hour =

American anthology TV series

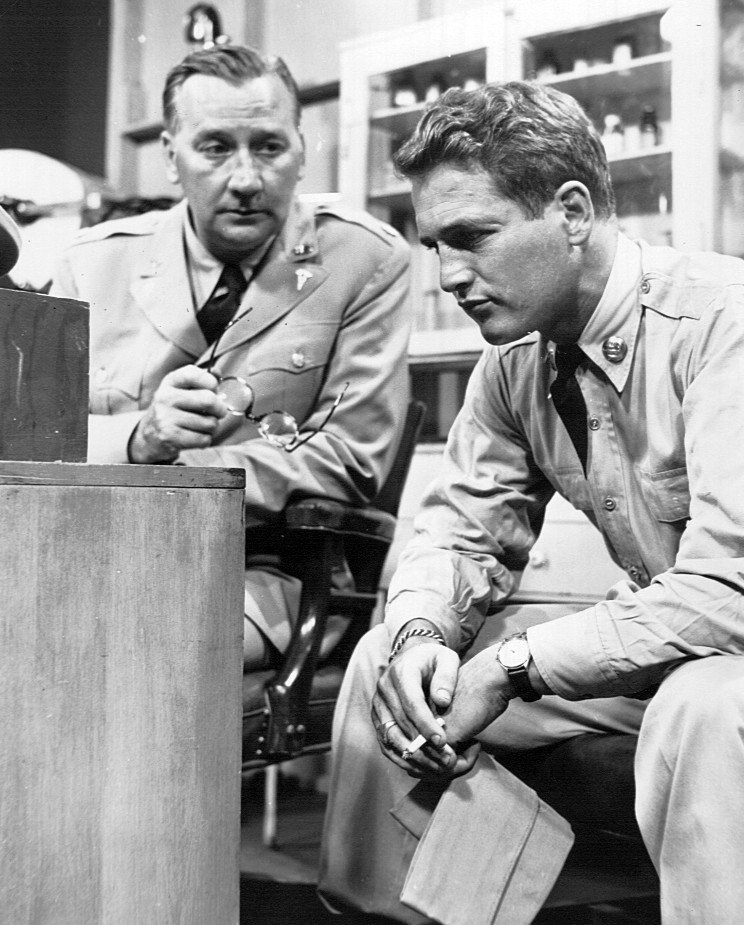
- Paul Newman and Edward Andrews in "Army Game"
- Genre: Drama, anthology
- Created by: Worthington Miner
- Written by: Fielder Cook; Sumner Locke Elliott; Evan Hunter; Loring Mandel; Gene Roddenberry; Rod Serling; David Swift (director); Robert Dozier
- Directed by: Paul Bogart; Fielder Cook; George Roy Hill; Franklin J. Schaffner; David Susskind
- Country of origin: United States
- Original language: English
- No. of seasons: 1
- No. of episodes: 25

Production
- Executive producer: Worthington Miner
- Producers: Fielder Cook; Franklin J. Schaffner; George Roy Hill; Jerome Hellman
- Production companies: Unit Four, in cooperation with NBC

Original release
- Network: NBC
- Release: July 3, 1956 – June 18, 1957

The Kaiser Aluminum Hour is a dramatic anthology television series which was broadcast in prime time in the United States from July 3, 1956, through June 18, 1957, by NBC.

The Kaiser Aluminum Hour was shown on alternate Tuesday nights at 9:30 pm Eastern time alternating with Armstrong Circle Theatre, with the first broadcast airing on July 3, 1956 and the final one on June 18, 1957. As can be surmised from the title, the program was sponsored by the Kaiser Aluminum Company. Unlike low-budget anthology series such as Fireside Theater, The Kaiser Aluminum Hour featured many well-known Hollywood actors of the era, including Paul Newman (who appeared in the first telecast, Army Game), Ralph Bellamy, MacDonald Carey, Hume Cronyn, Robert Culp, Kim Hunter, Forrest Tucker, Jack Warden, Natalie Wood, Felicia Montealegre Bernstein, William Shatner, and Dennis Hopper.

In April 1957 NBC proposed moving the series to the 10-11 p.m. Eastern Time slot, still on alternate Tuesdays, when the current contract ended. The sponsor declined to accept the offer, leaving the program's future uncertain.

The program won the Sylvania Award for New Series in 1956. Steven Gethers's script "Cracker Money" won second prize in competition for the best television plays of 1957 and was included in the book Best Television Plays 1957, published by Harcourt, Brace and Company.

== Production ==
Worthington Miner was the program's executive producer. A rotation of three men — Fielder Cook, George Roy Hill, and Frank Schaffner — produced and directed, with each selecting content for his episodes. Minor was president of Unit Four Productions (UFP), which initially produced the program. In November 1956 he resigned and was replaced by Jerome Hellman. By December 1956 the show had reduced its payments from $3,000 per script to $2,000 with a preference for future scripts to be melodramas. Beginning on February 26, 1957, Talent Associates, Limited replaced UFP as the show's producer after UFP and the Kaiser Company could not agree about what kinds of plays should be presented on the show. By February 24, 1957, Al Levy and David Susskind had become the program's producers.

== Episodes ==
Partial List of Episodes of The Kaiser Aluminum Hour
Date	Episode	Actor(s)
July 3, 1956	"The Army Game"	Newman, Philip Abbott, George Grizzard
September 11, 1956	"Antigone"	Claude Rains, Marisa Pavan
September 25, 1956	"Mr. Finchley vs. the Bomb"	Henry Hull, Bernard Kates, Paul Mazursky, Shatner, Harry Townes, Roland Winters
November 20, 1956	"The Rag Jungle"	Newman
December 4, 1956	"Cracker Money"	Louis Jean Heydt, Warren Berlinger, Carol Lynley, Glenda Farrell
January 29, 1957	"Throw Me a Rope"	-
February 12, 1957	"So Short a Season"	-
April 23, 1957	"A Man's Game"	Nanette Fabray, Fred Gwynne, Kenneth Bowers, Paul Ford, Gene Nelson, Bibi Osterwald, Lew Parker, Steven Shaw
May 21, 1957	"The Deadly Silence"	Harry Guardino`

== Critical response ==
The New York Times's critic Jack Gould wrote that the premiere episode of The Kaiser Aluminum Hour was "only too characteristic of contemporary video drama" in that it was a psychiatric study. Gould wrote that viewers could have only limited involvement with the story because the story presented the subject's medical problem but did nothing about it. The review complimented the staging of barracks scenes and Newman's "sound and sensitive portrayal" of the main character.

Gould called the December 4, 1956, episode "one of the season's more substantial works". He praised the acting of the leads and the supporting cast and wrote that the direction was "at its best".
