= The World of Henry Orient =

1964 film by George Roy Hill

- Theatrical poster
- Directed by: George Roy Hill
- Screenplay by: Nora Johnson; Nunnally Johnson
- Based on: The World of Henry Orient; 1958 novel by Nora Johnson
- Produced by: Jerome Hellman
- Starring: Peter Sellers; Paula Prentiss; Merrie Spaeth; Tippy Walker; Tom Bosley; Angela Lansbury
- Cinematography: Boris Kaufman; Arthur J. Ornitz
- Edited by: Stuart Gilmore
- Music by: Elmer Bernstein
- Production company: Pan Arts Company
- Distributed by: United Artists
- Release date: March 19, 1964
- Running time: 106 minutes
- Country: United States
- Language: English
- Budget: $2 million
- Box office: est. $2,100,000 (US/ Canada)

The World of Henry Orient is a 1964 American comedy-drama film directed by George Roy Hill and starring Peter Sellers, Paula Prentiss, Angela Lansbury, Tippy Walker, Merrie Spaeth, Phyllis Thaxter, Bibi Osterwald, and Tom Bosley. It is based on the novel of the same name by Nora Johnson, who co-wrote the screenplay with her father, Nunnally Johnson.

The original story was inspired in part by Nora Johnson's own experiences as a schoolgirl, as well as by a real-life incident involving singer Tony Bennett and two teenage fans.

== Plot ==
In New York City, concert pianist Henry Orient pursues an affair with a married woman, Stella Dunnworthy, while two adolescent private-school girls, Valerie "Val" Boyd and Marian "Gil" Gilbert, stalk him and write their fantasies about him in a diary. Henry's paranoia leads him to believe that the two girls, who seem to pop up everywhere he goes, are juvenile private detectives sent by his would-be mistress' husband.

In reality, 14-year-old Val, the bright, imaginative daughter of wealthy international trade expert Frank Boyd and his unfaithful, snobbish wife Isabel, has developed a teenage crush on Henry after seeing him in concert, and has involved her best friend Gil. Although Gil's parents are divorced, she lives a relatively stable, happy life in a townhouse in the city with her mother and her mother's also-divorced female friend, while Val, whose parents are still married (albeit unhappily), sees a psychiatrist daily and lives with paid caretakers while her parents travel the world.

When Val's parents return for Christmas, she becomes concerned that her mother Isabel is having an extramarital affair with a young pianist. Val's interference leads her mother to find and read Val's diary. Isabel chastises Val and seeks out Henry, ostensibly to tell him to stay away from her underage daughter. The cheating Isabel and the womanizing Henry are quickly attracted to each other and begin an affair, which Val and Gil accidentally discover while stalking Henry outside his apartment. Val's devastation and Isabel's attempts to cover up her own behavior cause Frank to figure out what happened. Frank and Isabel separate while the paranoid Henry flees the country. However, positive changes for Val result as Frank, who, unlike Isabel, genuinely cares about his daughter, resolves to stop traveling so often and establish a real home where he and Val can spend more time together. In the end, Val and Gil have matured and moved on from fantasy play to makeup, fashion, and boys their own age.

== Cast ==
- Peter Sellers as Henry Orient
- Paula Prentiss as Stella Dunnworthy
- Angela Lansbury as Isabel Boyd
- Tom Bosley as Frank Boyd
- Phyllis Thaxter as Avis Gilbert
- Bibi Osterwald as Erica "Boothy" Booth
- Merrie Spaeth as Marian "Gil" Gilbert
- Tippy Walker as Valerie "Val" Campbell Boyd
- John Fiedler as Sidney
- Al Lewis as the tobacconist
- Peter Duchin as Joe Daniels
- Fred Stewart as the doctor
- Philippa Bevans as Emma Hambler
- Jane Buchanan as Lillian Kafritz

== Production ==
=== Development ===
The novel was published in 1958. The New York Times said it was written with "warmth, insight and nostalgia."

The pianist's unusual surname, "Orient", came about because Nora Johnson based the character on Oscar Levant, a real-life concert pianist, raconteur, and film actor on whom she had a crush as a teenager. Since the word "levant" means Orient in French (literally the direction from which the sun rises), the name is a play on words. In the film, several allusions to the pianist's unusual name occur when his two teenage fans put on Chinese conical hats, address their idol as "Oriental Henry," kowtow to an Asian-style altar, and adopt vaguely Japanese-sounding names for themselves.

Nora Johnson's father Nunnally was a noted screenwriter but he said for three years, "it never occurred to me that it could be filmed, because I couldn't think of two girls to do it. " Johnson said his point of view changed when he saw Hayley Mills in a film and felt it could be done with Mills and Patty Duke. Johnson decided to write the script on "spec" and gave it to his agent to sell – one of the rare times in his career he had done this.

In April 1962, Nunnally Johnson said he wanted to adapt the book into a screenplay for 20th Century Fox.

Johnson says his daughter had written a script herself but felt it did not work as she was too inexperienced as a dramatist and too faithful to the book. He purchased the screen rights from her and they agreed to split the screenplay fee 50-50.

United Artists were interested in buying the script. Henry Koster, who had directed several comedies written by Johnson at Fox, read the script and loved it and pressured Richard Zanuck at Fox to buy it; Zanuck was keen but wanted his father Daryl to read it first. Daryl did not get around to reading it and Johnson decided to sell to United Artists. This upset Daryl Zanuck who felt he had been misled and ended the formerly close relationship between him and Johnson.

In April 1963, George Roy Hill announced that he and producer Jerome Hellman had bought the screen rights and would film it for their Pan Arts company which had a deal with United Artists.

=== Casting ===
Johnson wrote the role of Henry Orient for Rex Harrison but Harrison turned it down as the part was not big enough. In May 1963, Peter Sellers signed to play the male lead. It would be his first American movie. Sellers reportedly became available when a broken ankle meant he missed out on another job. The film's production was sped up to take advantage of his availability.

Sellers said his character had "a dreadful Brooklynese accent but in an attempt to appear cultured and charming he hides it with a phony French accent."

Spaeth, who was 15 at the time of filming, had no previous acting experience except for a minor role in a school production, and was cast after the head of her school's drama department suggested her to a talent scout. The World of Henry Orient is Spaeth's only film appearance, as she shortly thereafter left acting.

Walker, who was 16 at the time of filming and turned 17 shortly before the film was released, had worked as a model and was suggested to the film's producer by a photographer. The filmmakers had auditioned hundreds of girls but the two who were chosen were recommended through friends.

According to a 2012 article in The New Yorker by John Colapinto, director George Roy Hill handpicked Walker from hundreds of actresses who auditioned for the role of "Val". The filmmakers were so impressed with her performance that they reshaped the film during editing to focus more on her character, and shot the scene of her walking through a snowy Central Park months after production had wrapped. According to Colapinto, in the 2000s Walker revealed through a series of posts on IMDb that she and Hill fell in love during the filming, and that the relationship lasted throughout most of Walker's senior year in high school, even though Hill was married with children and, at age 44, nearly 30 years older than Walker. Walker claimed that the resulting Hollywood gossip made others reluctant to cast her and contributed to her decision to stop acting in the early 1970s.

Eddie Duchin's son Peter made his acting debut in the film.

=== Shooting ===
Filming started on July 29, 1963, at the Long Island studios at Roosevelt Field. It wrapped that October.

Ken Lauber composed the intentionally awful piano concerto that Henry Orient performs onscreen. In the novel, Orient performs Aram Khachaturian's 1936 Piano Concerto. The producers initially hired David Raksin to write the onscreen music. Lauber was hired after Raksin was fired. The two collaborated on the score, and Raksin conducted the recording session for the movie.

Johnson said Hill made some notable contributions to the film including "those runs through the park. He used trampolines and some kind of slow motion, and it gave it a real quality of soaring childhood, released, all the way through. He's one of these dedicated directors, one that takes trouble. I thought he did it beautifully, and I appreciated it."

=== Controversy ===
Years later Tippy Walker, who was sixteen at the time of filming, alleged that 44 year-old director George Roy Hill initiated an inappropriate romantic relationship with her that lasted several years. She also alleged that he undermined her acting career once she ended the relationship.

== Reception ==
The World of Henry Orient premiered at Radio City Music Hall on March 19, 1964.

=== Awards ===
It was the official U.S. entry at the 1964 Cannes Film Festival.

In 1965, it was nominated for the Golden Globe Award in the category "Best Motion Picture, Musical or Comedy" and for a Writers Guild of America Award for "Best Written American Comedy."

=== Critical ===
The film was well received by critics and has an 91% rating at Rotten Tomatoes. In his review for The New York Times, Bosley Crowther wrote that it was "one of the most joyous and comforting movies about teenagers that we've had in a long time".

It was voted one of the Year's Ten Best Films by the National Board of Review in 1964.

Johnson said "when I saw the picture, I was just delighted with it."

=== Box Office ===
Johnson says the film performed strongly at the box office in New York but struggled elsewhere and failed to return its costs. He and Hill felt that "the title was very bad though he didn't realize it then. It conveyed nothing to anybody." Johnson felt that this may have turned children off from going into the film. Johnson also thought Peter Sellers, while funny, played the role too broadly, and that the film would have worked better with Rex Harrison.

== Musical adaptation ==
A Broadway musical adaptation of The World of Henry Orient called Henry, Sweet Henry, with music and lyrics by Bob Merrill, book by Nunnally Johnson (the father of Nora Johnson), direction by George Roy Hill and choreography by Michael Bennett, opened at the Palace Theatre on October 23, 1967. It starred Don Ameche as Henry Orient, Neva Small as Marian Gilbert, Robin Wilson as Valerie Boyd, Milo Bouton as Mr Boyd, Carol Bruce as Mrs. Boyd and Louise Lasser as Stella. Pia Zadora also appeared in the role of a student. The show ran for 80 performances and closed on December 31, 1967, receiving less than stellar reviews. William Goldman, in his study of the 1967–68 theater year, The Season: A Candid Look at Broadway, claimed that the musical was of high quality but was old fashioned, and "had the misfortune" to open just a week after all the critics "were overcome by Hair," which had a modern sound.

Although the show was not a success, one of its performers, Alice Playten, received a 1968 Theatre World Award, and was nominated for a Tony Award for "Best Featured Actress in a Musical" for playing the role of Kafritz, which was enlarged substantially for the play. In addition, Michael Bennett was nominated for a Tony for "Best Choreography."

== See also ==
- George Roy Hill filmography
- List of American films of 1964

== Notes ==
- Johnson, Nunnally (1969). Recollections of Nunnally Johnson oral history transcript. University of California, Los Angeles. Dept. of Theater Arts; University of California, Los Angeles. Oral History Program.
