= Period of Adjustment (film) =

1962 film by George Roy Hill

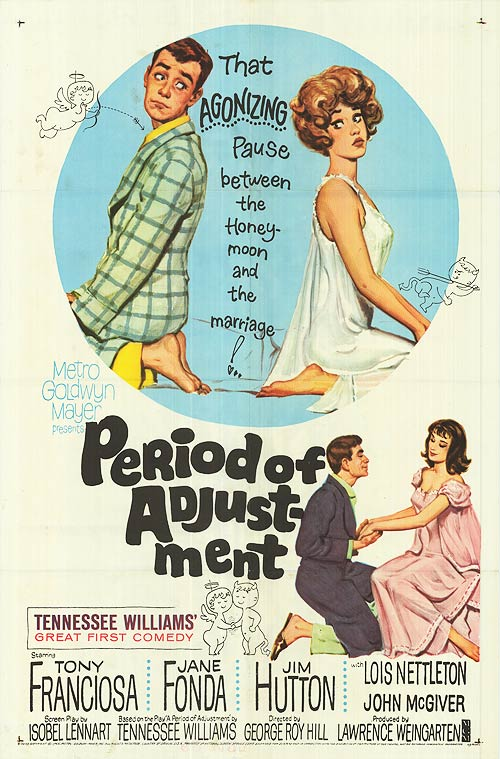
- Theatrical release poster
- Directed by: George Roy Hill
- Screenplay by: Isobel Lennart
- Based on: Period of Adjustment; 1961 play by Tennessee Williams
- Produced by: Lawrence Weingarten
- Starring: Tony Franciosa; Jane Fonda; Jim Hutton; Lois Nettleton; John McGiver
- Cinematography: Paul C. Vogel
- Edited by: Fredric Steinkamp
- Music by: Lyn Murray
- Distributed by: Metro-Goldwyn-Mayer
- Release date: October 31, 1962
- Running time: 112 minutes
- Country: United States
- Language: English
- Budget: $1.9 million
- Box office: $4 million

Period of Adjustment is a 1962 American comedy-drama film directed by George Roy Hill from a screenplay written by Isobel Lennart, based on Tennessee Williams' 1960 play of the same name. The film stars Tony Franciosa, Jane Fonda, Jim Hutton and Lois Nettleton.

Period of Adjustment was released on October 31, 1962, by Metro-Goldwyn-Mayer and marked Hill's directorial debut. The film also launched Fonda to bankable film stardom, earning her a nomination for the Golden Globe Award for Best Actress – Motion Picture Comedy or Musical.

== Plot ==
Two couples are experiencing difficulty in their marital relationships. Newlyweds Isabel and George Haverstick are having a problem because George has bouts of sexual performance anxiety and has quit his job without telling her. George's war buddy Ralph is at odds with his wife Dottie, whom he had married for money, and he dislikes her wealthy parents. Ralph is also upset with Dottie for allowing their young son to play with a doll.

Isabel and George visit Ralph on Christmas Eve, but Dottie has left Ralph. George and Isabel fight constantly and she angrily objects to his neglect. Ralph consoles Isabel and tries to convince George to show her some kindness. Dottie peers in the window and sees Isabel in the house, assuming the worst. When Dottie's angry parents arrive to collect her belongings, Isabel defends George's war record to Dottie's mother, causing George to experience a change of heart as he overhears. Dottie's father unsuccessfully tries to have Ralph arrested for attempted embezzlement. Ralph viciously humiliates Dottie on the ride back to the house from the police station.

Dottie and Ralph settle their differences, and she is overcome with emotion to find a fur coat that he has bought her for Christmas. Isabel and George also make amends.

== Cast ==
- Anthony Franciosa as Ralph Baitz (as Tony Franciosa)
- Jane Fonda as Isabel Haverstick
- Jim Hutton as George Haverstick
- Lois Nettleton as Dorothea Baitz
- John McGiver as Stewart P. McGill
- Mabel Albertson as Mrs. Alice McGill
- Jack Albertson as Desk Sergeant

== Production ==
Williams' play was originally going to be directed on Broadway by Elia Kazan. When he dropped out he was replaced by George Roy Hill.

MGM paid $100,000 for the film rights, which made the original Broadway production profitable. The studio assigned Lawrence Weingarten to produce. Hill signed a two-picture deal with MGM to direct; the second was to be an adaptation of William L. Shirer's 1960 book The Rise and Fall of the Third Reich but it was decided to turn that into a TV series so the contract was amended.

Filming started 10 April 1962. Jim Hutton was under contract to MGM at the time.

== Reception ==
=== Critical ===
In a contemporary review for The New York Times, critic Bosley Crowther wrote: "Whatever there is in the way of humor in watching young married people quarrel and display attitudes in their relations that range between juvenile and immature is made abundantly available in 'Period of Adjustment,'' a tart little motion picture from the play by Tennessee Williams. ... The humor and pathos of 'adjusting' by clumsy young people is fairly put. The only questions are whether it's worth their efforts and whether it's worth your money to watch them fight."

Crowther praised Fonda's performance: "Jane Fonda is appropriately shallow and jittery as the newlywed wife. Her vague emotions and wispy feelings seem no deeper than her goose-pimples, which are revealed in some strangely familiar acting. Could it be the late Marilyn Monroe that Miss Fonda seems to resemble? She surely won't mind our saying so."

Variety called it an "uneven film" with "more peaks than troughs".

=== Box office ===
According to MGM records, the film earned $2,750,000 in North America and $1.5 million overseas, making the studio a profit of $558,000. Filmink later speculated:

Why did Period of Adjustment, based on a play that had been disappointing on Broadway, featuring a B-list cast and then-unknown director, and recipient of mixed reviews, become a sleeper hit? Our theory: because Jane Fonda, young and gorgeous, spends most of the film trying to have sex with new husband Jim Hutton. That was fresh. Audiences were intrigued, and titillated, in sufficient numbers for the film to make money.

== Awards and nominations ==
Award	Category	Nominee(s)	Result
Academy Awards	Best Art Direction – Black-and-White	George Davis, Edward Carfagno, Henry Grace and Richard Pefferle	Nominated
Golden Globe Awards	Best Actress in a Motion Picture – Musical or Comedy	Jane Fonda	Nominated
Laurel Awards	Top Female Comedy Performance	Jane Fonda	Nominated
Writers Guild of America Awards	Best Written American Comedy	Isobel Lennart	Nominated

== See also ==
- George Roy Hill filmography
- List of Christmas films
