= Toys in the Attic (play) =

1960 play by Lillian Hellman

- Playbill cover for Toys in the Attic at Hudson Theatre
- Original language: English
- Written by: Lillian Hellman
- Subject: A dysfunctional family
- Genre: Drama
- Setting: New Orleans

Premiere
- Date: February 25, 1960
- Place: Hudson Theatre; New York City

Toys in the Attic is a 1960 play by Lillian Hellman.

== Plot ==
Set in New Orleans following the Great Depression, the play focuses on the Berniers sisters, two middle-aged spinsters who have sacrificed their own ambitions to look after their ne'er-do-well younger brother Julian, whose grandiose dreams repeatedly lead to financial disasters. When he unexpectedly returns home accompanied by his emotionally unstable, childlike young bride Lily, her aloof, aristocratic mother Albertine, and an unexplained large sum of money, Carrie and Anna suddenly find that the position of power they have always held has become unbalanced, leaving their lives in chaos.

== Background ==
It took Hellman three years to complete the semi-autobiographical play, which evolved from a plot suggested by her lover Dashiell Hammett, most of which eventually was abandoned. Julian is based on Hellman's father Max, who was adored by his two sisters and became a successful salesman after his first business failed. Carrie has an incestuous infatuation with her brother, similar to the strong sexual attraction Hellman felt for an uncle when she was an adolescent, and one of her aunts had an affair with an African-American chauffeur, as does Albertine in the play.

== Original production ==
The original Broadway production was directed by Arthur Penn, who later recalled the rehearsal period was difficult. "Actors were fearful of Lillian. She was very judgmental." The playwright would sit in the darkened theater, coughing whenever she disapproved of something. Penn finally told her, "Go home and fire us all if you don’t like it. But don’t sit there coughing. It scares the hell out of them." Not helping the situation was the fact "both Jason Robards and Maureen Stapleton were drinking considerably."

Produced by Kermit Bloomgarden, the play opened at the Hudson Theatre on February 25, 1960 and closed on April 8, 1961 after 456 performances. The production included "French Lessons in Songs" and "Bernier Day" by Marc Blitzstein.

=== Cast ===
Jason Robards	Julian Berniers
Maureen Stapleton	Carrie Berniers
Irene Worth	Albertine Prine
Anne Revere	Anna Berniers
Rochelle Oliver	Lily Berniers
Percy Rodrigues	Henry Simpson
Charles McRae	Gus

== Critical reception ==
In his review in the New York Herald Tribune, Walter Kerr said the play "binds us to it with a cold, serpentine grace that is born of a clear head, a level eye, and a fierce respect for the unchanging color of the precisely used word." Brooks Atkinson of The New York Times thought that although it was "not the greatest play in the world, it is head and shoulders above the level of the season, and it provides opportunities for some extraordinary acting."

== Awards and nominations ==
The play won the New York Drama Critics' Circle Award for Best Play.

It was nominated for the Tony Award for Best Play but lost to The Miracle Worker by William Gibson. Jason Robards was nominated for the Tony Award for Best Performance by a Leading Actor in a Play but lost to Melvyn Douglas in The Best Man. Both Maureen Stapleton and Irene Worth were nominated for the Tony Award for Best Performance by a Leading Actress in a Play but lost to Anne Bancroft in The Miracle Worker.

Anne Revere won the Tony Award for Best Performance by a Featured Actress in a Play, and Howard Bay won the Tony Award for Best Scenic Design of a Play.

== Film adaptation ==
James Poe adapted the play for a 1963 film directed by George Roy Hill.

== Off-Broadway revival ==
In 2007, Austin Pendleton directed a revival of the play for a limited run mounted by the off-Broadway Pearl Theater Company in the East Village. Ginia Bellafante of The New York Times said the play "has no patience for nostalgia and nothing but judgments for the obsessive attachments of family. It yearns, remarkably, for room and reason."
