= Nora Johnson =

American novelist (1933–2017)

- Born: January 31, 1933; Hollywood, California, United States
- Died: October 5, 2017 (aged 84); Dallas, Texas, United States
- Education: Smith College
- Occupation: Novelist
- Spouse(s): Leonard Siwek (m. 1955, divorced) Jack Milici (m. 1964, divorced) George Johnston (m. 2006; died 2011)
- Children: Marion Siwek Paula Siwek Justin Milici Jonathan Milici
- Relatives: Nunnally Johnson (father); Marion Byrnes (mother); Marjorie Fowler (sister)
- Writing career
- Genre: Comedy
- Subject: Attitudes towards sex
- Notable work: The World of Henry Orient

Nora Johnson (January 31, 1933 – October 5, 2017) was an American author.

== Early life ==
Nora Johnson, daughter of filmmaker Nunnally Johnson and Marion Byrnes, was born in Hollywood, California in 1933.

...living in New York with her mother but spending considerable time with her father and stepmother in Hollywood...

She was educated at the Brearley School, Abbot Academy, and Smith College, from which she graduated in 1954. Her half-sister was the film editor Marjorie Fowler.

== Writings ==
Her first novel, The World of Henry Orient, inspired by her experiences at the Brearley School, was published in 1956, and was made into a motion picture starring Peter Sellers in 1964. Her influential article Sex and the College Girl, was published in the November 1959 issue of The Atlantic Monthly, discussing attitudes towards sex on American campuses.

Johnson's other works include:

- A Step Beyond Innocence (Little, Brown, 1961)
- Loveletter in the Dead-Letter Office (Delacorte, 1966)
- Pat Loud: A Woman's Story (Bantam, 1974), Pat Loud, 1926-2021, and Nora Johnson, joint authors
- Flashback: Nora Johnson on Nunnally Johnson (Doubleday, 1979)
- You Can Go Home Again: An Intimate Journey (Doubleday, 1982)
- The Two of Us (Simon & Schuster, 1984)
- Tender Offer (Simon & Schuster, 1985)
- Uncharted Places (Simon & Schuster, 1988)
- Perfect Together (E. P. Dutton, 1991).
- Coast to Coast: A Family Romance (Simon & Schuster, 2004)

== Death ==
Johnson died on October 5, 2017, in Dallas, Texas; cause of death was not specified.
