= Bibi Osterwald =

American actress (1920–2002)

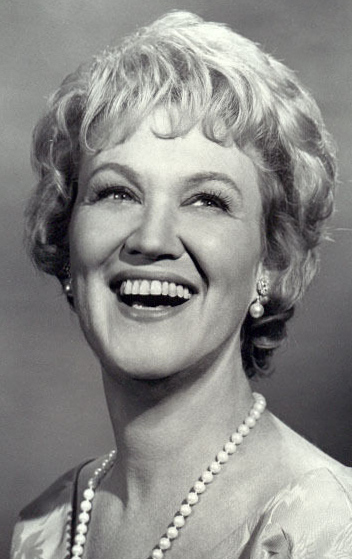
- Born: Margaret Virginia Osterwald; February 3, 1920; New Brunswick, New Jersey, U.S.
- Died: January 2, 2002 (aged 81); Burbank, California, U.S.
- Occupation: Actress
- Years active: 1944–2002
- Spouse: Justin Arndt (m. 1951–2002; her death)
- Children: 1

Margaret Virginia "Bibi" Osterwald (February 3, 1920 – January 2, 2002) was an American actress.

== Life and career ==
Osterwald was born in New Brunswick, New Jersey, the daughter of Dagmar (Kvastad) and Rudolf August Osterwald, a hotel owner.

As a student, Osterwald appeared in the Catholic University semi-pro revue in Washington, D.C., in August 1942. She gained acting experience in five years of work in summer stock theatre in Rockville, Maryland. She starred in Ten Nights in a Barroom at the Willard Hotel for 8 weeks starting in mid-August 1943. She then pursued a career on the New York stage. The Central Opera House [NYC], seating 2000, introduced Osterwald leading in Broken Hearts of Broadway in June 1944. "Miss Osterwald is on Broadway as one of the outstanding participants in 'Sing Out, Sweet Land.' What is more, next to stars Alfred Drake and Burl Ives, she has received the loudest praise of those critics who saw the play out of town. Its road tour Included Hartford, Boston and Philadelphia." -December 28, 1944.

Osterwald went on to appear in such Broadway shows as Gentlemen Prefer Blondes, Bus Stop, Three to Make Ready, and The Golden Apple, for which she won an Outer Critics Circle Award in 1953.

She was a standby for the title role on Broadway in the musical Hello Dolly!. This fact is referenced in the song "Playing Second Fiddle" from the Off-Broadway musical Nunsense. The lyric says, "Who here knows that Dolly Levi's also Bibi Osterwald? Carol Channing wasn't sick, so Bibi wasn't called."

Starting in the late 1940s, Osterwald began appearing on television, continuing to do so through the end of 2001. She was best known for her television role of Stella O'Brien, the cranky housekeeper for the Hathaway family on the soap opera, Where the Heart Is in the 1970s and also as Mrs. Sophie Steinberg, the mother of David Birney and mother-in-law of Meredith Baxter on the comedy series, Bridget Loves Bernie. She played Anita, who becomes an avid fan of The Amazing Alonzo (Vincent Price) in "The Love Boat" S2 E6 "Ship of Ghouls" (1978).

In 1982, she originated the role of Nanny McTavish, Holly Sutton's long-time confidante, on General Hospital. Her other roles included Mrs. Nakamura on The Absent-Minded Professor (1988). She was also a regular on The S.S. Holiday (1950), The Imogene Coca Show (1954), Captain Billy's Showboat (1948) and Front Row Center (1949).

She appeared in several films, including Parrish (1961), The World of Henry Orient (1964), A Fine Madness (1966), Bank Shot (1974), Caddyshack II (1988) and As Good as It Gets (1997).

In the years just prior to her death in 2002, she was a voice actress for the cartoon series Rugrats.

Outside of acting, she was a frequent participant on the Ben Bagley's Revisited series of famous pop composers including albums of rarities by Cole Porter, Rodgers & Hart Vol.2 and Frank Loesser.

On January 2, 2002, Osterwald died of a lung ailment in Burbank, California, at age 81.

== Filmography ==
Year	Title	Role	Notes
1961	Parrish	Rosie	
1964	The World of Henry Orient	Erica Booth	
1966	A Fine Madness	Mrs. Fitzgerald	
1967	The Tiger Makes Out	Mrs. Ratner	
1974	Bank Shot	Mums Gornik	
1977	The Great Smokey Roadblock	Annie McCarigle	
1978	The Great Bank Hoax	Sara Pennysworth	
1988	Moving	Crystal Butterworth	
1988	Caddyshack II	Mrs. Pierpont	
1994	Angie	Dr. Gould's Nurse	
1995	The Wayans Bros.	Saleslady	S1:E8
1996	The Paper Brigade	Widow Hansen	
1996	The Glimmer Man	Woman In Ovington Arms	
1997	As Good as It Gets	Neighbor Woman	
