= Toys in the Attic (1963 film) =

1963 film by George Roy Hill

- Promotional movie poster
- Directed by: George Roy Hill
- Screenplay by: James Poe
- Based on: Toys in the Attic; 1960 play by Lillian Hellman
- Produced by: Walter Mirisch
- Starring: Dean Martin; Geraldine Page; Yvette Mimieux; Wendy Hiller; Gene Tierney
- Cinematography: Joseph F. Biroc
- Edited by: Stuart Gilmore
- Music by: George Duning
- Color process: Black and white
- Production companies: Meadway-Claude Productions Company; The Mirisch Corporation
- Distributed by: United Artists
- Release date: July 31, 1963
- Running time: 90 minutes
- Country: United States
- Language: English
- Budget: $2.1 million

Toys in the Attic is a 1963 American drama film directed by George Roy Hill and starring Dean Martin, Geraldine Page, Yvette Mimieux, Gene Tierney, and Wendy Hiller. The film is based on a Tony Award-winning play of the same name by Lillian Hellman. The screenplay adaptation is by James Poe, and the original music score was composed by George Duning.

== Plot ==
Julian Berniers returns from Chicago with his young bride Lily Prine to his family in New Orleans. His spinster sisters, Carrie and Anna, welcome the couple, who arrive with expensive gifts. Julian tells them that, though his factory went out of business, he did manage to save money. Although the sisters are skeptical, there is much talk of a long-hoped-for trip to Europe for the two sisters. In fact, Julian has money from a real-estate deal that he pulled off with help from Charlotte Warkins, a former lover who is now in an abusive marriage.

Carrie is obsessed with her brother. Her jealousy, deriving from her sublimated incestuous desires for him, is aimed at Lily. Carrie tricks Lily into informing Charlotte's husband of a rendezvous between Charlotte and Julian, at which Julian was to give Charlotte her half of the money; then Charlotte would leave her husband and flee town. Charlotte's husband sends thugs to beat up Julian, maim Charlotte, and take both halves of the money.

Julian discovers that Carrie has manipulated Lily into phoning Charlotte's husband and convincing Lily that Julian and Charlotte were going to leave together. After Carrie hurls insults at Julian and Anna, telling them that both will be failures, both leave the house. Julian finds and reconciles with Lily, and Anna leaves for Europe. Carrie is left alone, deluding herself into thinking that both will return someday.

== Cast ==
- Dean Martin as Julian Berniers
- Geraldine Page as Carrie Berniers
- Yvette Mimieux as Lily Prine Berniers
- Gene Tierney as Albertine Prine
- Wendy Hiller as Anna Berniers
- Nan Martin as Charlotte Warkins
- Larry Gates as Cyrus Warkins
- Frank Silvera as Henry Simpson

== Reception ==
On Rotten Tomatoes, the film has a rating of 40% based on 5 critics, with an average rating of 4.8/10.

The film recorded a loss of $1.2 million.

The film was nominated for the Best Costume Design (Black & White) Oscar (Bill Thomas), and it received nominations for the Best Actress Golden Globe (Geraldine Page) and the Best Supporting Actress Golden Globe (Wendy Hiller).

== See also ==
- George Roy Hill filmography
