= Period of Adjustment =

Play by Tennessee Williams

First edition (publ. New Directions)

Period of Adjustment (subtitled High Point is Built Over a Cavern) is a 1960 play by Tennessee Williams that was adapted in the film version of 1962.

Both the stage and film versions are set on Christmas Eve and tell the gentle, light-hearted story of two couples, one newlywed and the other married for five years, both experiencing pains and difficulties in their relationships. The two male characters are veterans of the Korean War. The younger of the two experiences post traumatic stress (shellshock, battle fatigue, combat stress reaction), and the older man suffers from feelings of inadequacy towards his wife, the daughter of his boss. However, the observance of each other’s troubles brings both couples to realize what they have and to reconcile their own relationships.

Williams wrote the first draft of the play in November 1958 "in a rush of activity partly induced by drugs." It was workshopped for a week in December 1958 and officially premiered at the Helen Hayes Theatre on Broadway on November 10, 1960. It was presented directed by George Roy Hill, the stage settings and lighting were by Jo Mielziner, the costumes were by Patricia Zipprodt, General Manager Joseph Harris, and the production stage manager was William Chambers. The play, which Williams subtitled "a serious comedy," was a departure from the playwright's usual dark dramas, and was written partly in response to a Hollywood columnist who had asked why his plays were always "plunging into the sewers." Williams responded to the criticism by writing Period of Adjustment and arguing, in a piece that was published in The New York Times,

The theatre has made its greatest artistic advance through the unlocking and lighting up and ventilation of the closets, attics, and basements of human behaviour and experience. No significant area of human experience should be held inaccessible, provided it is presented with honest intention and taste, to the writers of our desperate time.

The play received average reviews and closed March 4, 1961 after 132 performances. The original cast in order of appearance was:

- James Daly as Ralph Bates
- Barbara Baxley as Isabel Haverstick
- Robert Webber as George Haverstick
- Helen Martin as Susie
- Esther Benson as Lady Caroler
- Nancy R. Pollock as Mrs. McGillicuddy
- Lester Mack as Mr. McGillicuddy
- Charles McDaniel as The Police Officer
- Rosemary Murphy as Dorothy Bates

In February 2006, the play was revived at the Almeida Theatre in London.

== Awards and nominations ==
=== Original Broadway production ===
| Year | Award | Category | Nominee | Result |
|---|---|---|---|---|
| 1961 | Tony Award | Best Actress in a Play | Barbara Baxley | Nominated |
| 1961 | Tony Award | Best Featured Actress in a Play | Rosemary Murphy | Nominated |
