= George Roy Hill =

American film director (1921–2002)

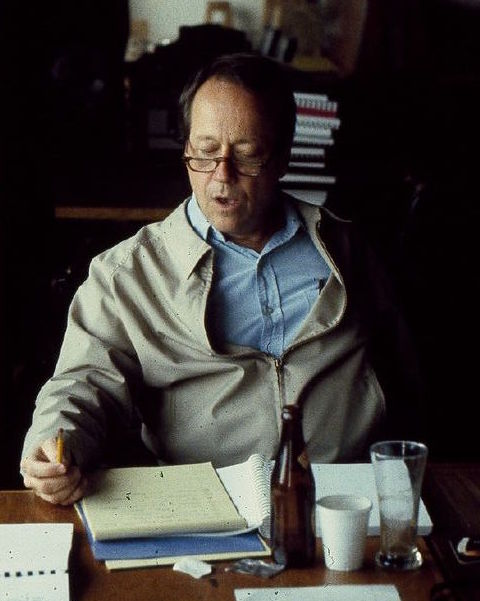
- Hill working on a screenplay, 1978
- Born: December 20, 1921; Minneapolis, Minnesota, U.S.
- Died: December 27, 2002 (aged 81); New York City, New York, U.S.
- Education: Yale University, Trinity College Dublin
- Occupations: Director, writer, producer, actor
- Years active: 1946–2002
- Notable work: Full list
- Spouse: Louisa Horton (m. 1951; div. 1971)
- Children: 4
- Relatives: Tim Hill (nephew)

George Roy Hill (December 20, 1921 – December 27, 2002) was an American film director, writer, producer and actor. His films include Butch Cassidy and the Sundance Kid (1969) and The Sting (1973), both starring Paul Newman and Robert Redford. Both films also earned him nominations for the Academy Award for Best Director; he won for the latter.

Hill also directed The World of Henry Orient (1964), Hawaii (1966), Thoroughly Modern Millie (1967), Slaughterhouse-Five (1972), The Great Waldo Pepper (1975), Slap Shot (1977), A Little Romance (1979), The World According to Garp (1982) and his final film Funny Farm (1988). According to one obituary "few directors achieved such fame and success... even fewer enjoyed such eminence for such a short period of time."

== Early life and education ==
He was born in Minneapolis, Minnesota, to George Roy and Helen Frances (née Owens) Hill, part of a well-to-do Roman Catholic family with interests in the newspaper business; the family owned the Minneapolis Tribune. Hill was no relation to George W. Hill, director and cinematographer of numerous silent movies and early sound films in the 1920s and early 1930s. He was educated at The Blake School, one of Minnesota's most prestigious private schools, and graduated from Yale University with a Bachelor of Music in 1943. He received his master's degree in literature and music from Trinity College Dublin.

He had a love of flying. After school he liked to visit the airport, and his hobby was to memorize the records of World War I flying aces. He idolized pilot Speed Holman, who, Hill once explained, "used to make his approach to the spectators at state fairs flying past the grandstand upside down." Hill obtained his pilot's license at the age of sixteen. Airplanes featured prominently in his later films and are frequently crashed as well — in Slaughterhouse-Five, The World According to Garp and especially The Great Waldo Pepper which showed the influence on Hill of pilots like Speed Holman.

Hill loved classical music, especially Johann Sebastian Bach, and as an undergraduate at Yale University studied music under notable composer Paul Hindemith, graduating in 1943. His film The World of Henry Orient contains a humorous spoof-like tease of Hindemith during the piano concerto scene of Henry Orient (Peter Sellers). While at Yale, Hill was a member of Delta Kappa Epsilon, the Scroll & Key Society and of The Spizzwinks(?) and The Whiffenpoofs, America's oldest collegiate a cappella singing group.

== Military service ==
During World War II, Hill served in the United States Marine Corps as a transport pilot with VMR-152 in the South Pacific. The outbreak of the Korean War resulted in his recall to active duty service for 18 months as a night fighter pilot, attaining the rank of major. After the war, he was stationed at the Marine Corps Air Station Cherry Point jet flight-training center in North Carolina.

== Early career ==
After being discharged, Hill worked as a newspaper reporter in Texas, then took advantage of the GI Bill to do graduate work at Trinity College, Dublin, studying James Joyce's use of music in Ulysses and Finnegans Wake. Some sources say he graduated in 1949 with a bachelor's degree in literature.

Other sources say his thesis was never completed because he became sidetracked by the Irish theater, making his stage debut as a walk-on part in 1947 at the Gaiety Theatre, Dublin, with Cyril Cusack's company in a production of George Bernard Shaw's The Devil's Disciple. He had a leading role in Raven of Wicklow by Bridget G. MacCarthy in the same theater in February 1948.

=== Actor ===
On his return to the U.S., Hill studied theatre at HB Studio in New York City. He acted Off Broadway and toured with Margaret Webster's Shakespeare Repertory Company. He appeared on Broadway in Richard II, The Taming of the Shrew, and August Strindberg's Creditors (with Bea Arthur).

In 1952 he was featured in a supporting role in the Hollywood movie Walk East on Beacon, and appeared in episodes of Lux Video Theatre including "The Doctor's Wife", "Man at Bay" and "Masquerade". He also acted in episodes of Kraft Theatre such as "The Golden Slate". He also acted on radio, including portraying Ned on The Doctor's Wife.

=== Television and theatre director ===
Hill used his Korean War experience as the basis for a TV drama, "My Brother's Keeper", which appeared on Kraft Television Theatre, with Hill himself in the cast. During his military service at Cherry Point, he had had to be 'talked down' by a ground controller at Atlanta airport, an incident that led to his writing the screenplay. The episode was performed and broadcast live in 1953. After his demobilisation, he joined the Kraft Television Theatre as a writer, one of his scripts included Keep Our Honor Bright. He later directed episodes of Ponds Theater ("Time of the Drought"), and Lux Video Theatre ("The Creaking Gate", "Not All Your Tears", "The Happy Man".) Hill returned to Broadway in 1957 as director of the Pulitzer Prize-winning play Look Homeward, Angel. Starring Jo Van Fleet and Anthony Perkins, this ran for 564 performances.

Hill continued to direct television, most notably episodes of Kraft Theatre including "Eleven O'Clock Flight", "The Devil as a Roaring Lion", "Good Old Charlie Faye", "A Night to Remember", an adaptation of Walter Lord's book about the sinking of the Titanic (of which Hill also co-wrote the teleplay). In addition he did "Man on the White Horse", "Carnival", and "A Real Fine Cutting Edge" with George Peppard for The Kaiser Aluminum Hour. Hill's work on "A Night to Remember" earned him two Emmy nominations for writing and directing at the 9th Primetime Emmy Awards. He directed some famous episodes of Playhouse 90 including "The Helen Morgan Story" (1957), "The Last Clear Chance" (1958), "Child of Our Time" (1958), and "Judgment at Nuremberg" (1959).

Hill then focused on theatre, directing the Broadway productions of The Gang's All Here (1960) with Melvyn Douglas (132 performances), Greenwillow (1960) with Anthony Perkins (97 performances) and Period of Adjustment (1961) by Tennessee Williams, which ran for 132 performances. He replaced Elia Kazan for the latter.

=== Feature film director ===
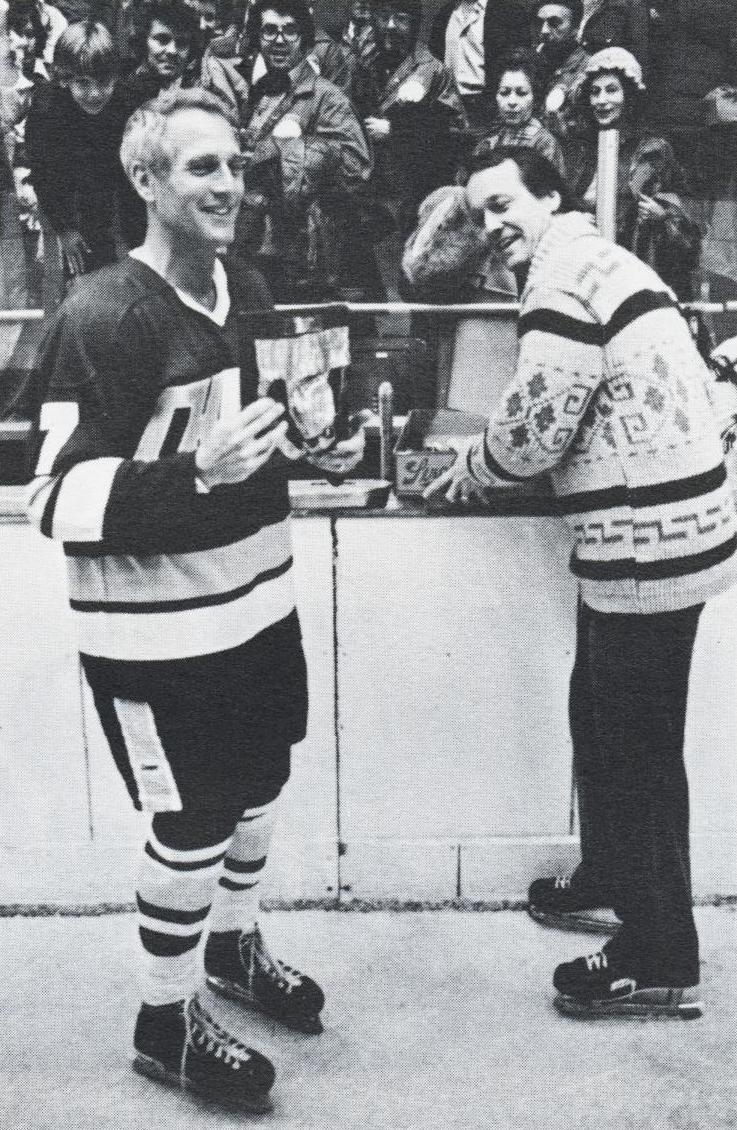
Hill (right) with actor Paul Newman on the set of Slap Shot in 1976

Hill's success as a theatre director led to his first feature as director – the film version of Period of Adjustment (1962). Starring Jane Fonda and Jim Hutton, it was a box office success. He was meant to follow with an adaptation of The Rise and Fall of the Third Reich by William Shirer at MGM for producer John Houseman but it was not made. In light of that his next project was an adaptation of Lillian Hellman's Toys in the Attic (1963) starring Dean Martin. Hill's next step was a movie based on the novel The World of Henry Orient (1964). Hill and producer Jerome Hellman bought the rights for their own Pan Arts Company. The movie was critically acclaimed but was a commercial disappointment.

Hill was hired to direct the blockbuster Hawaii (1966) after Fred Zinnemann pulled out. Reportedly, when budget estimates reached $14 million, the producers attempted to replace Hill with Arthur Hiller, but abandoned the idea after hundreds of native Polynesians in the cast went on strike, declaring: "We can and will perform only for our friend, Monsieur Hill." The movie was a huge commercial success. Hill rebuilt his Hollywood reputation with the Julie Andrews musical Thoroughly Modern Millie (1967) produced by Ross Hunter. Hill was fired during the editing process because he wanted to make the film shorter, whereas Universal wanted to turn it into a roadshow production. However it was a solid box office hit.

He returned to Broadway to direct Henry, Sweet Henry (1967), a musical version of The World of Henry Orient, but it only lasted for 80 performances. He was meant to follow that with a film called Hamburger Dreams, about a screenwriter in 1930s Hollywood, but it was never made. Instead, Hill had a huge commercial success with Butch Cassidy and the Sundance Kid (1969), based on a script by William Goldman and starring Paul Newman and Robert Redford. The film received seven Academy Award nominations, including ones for Best Picture and Best Director, and won four, including for Best Original Song, "Raindrops Keep Fallin' on My Head" at the 42nd Academy Awards. In 1970, he said a common theme of his films was innocence vs evil. Hill followed it with Slaughterhouse-Five (1972). "Most of the characters in my film are not too bright," he said in a 1972 interview.

Hill was reunited with Newman and Redford in The Sting (1973), which won seven Academy Awards, including Best Picture and Best Director at the 46th Academy Awards. The success of Butch Cassidy and The Sting meant that, for a time, Hill was the only director in history to have made two of the top 10 money-making films. Hill disliked tardiness on set. Paul Newman said of his time (as Butch Cassidy) on Butch Cassidy: "If you weren’t on time, he’d take you up in his airplane. Scare the bejesus out of us."

=== Later career ===
The Great Waldo Pepper (1975) was based on a story by Hill, with a script by William Goldman and starring Robert Redford. However, it was a commercial disappointment. Around that time he said in an interview: "Just as I play nothing but Bach for pleasure, so do I read nothing but history for pleasure. I like to be able to sit back and pick out the most fascinating facets of an era. You have a better perspective. In the present, you get too caught up in the heat of the emotions of the moment."

In August 1974, Hill signed an exclusive five-year contract with Universal to make projects following Pepper. "Why shouldn't we give George that kind of deal?" said studio executive Jennings Lang. "He's the complete filmmaker. He can put a blank piece of paper in the typewriter and make a movie out of it up to and including the music." Hill made Slap Shot (1977), a popular sports comedy with Paul Newman. His next film was A Little Romance (1979), and The World According to Garp (1982), with Robin Williams and Glenn Close, in her film debut. He also directed The Little Drummer Girl (1984) with Diane Keaton.

His last film was Funny Farm (1988) with Chevy Chase. Screenwriter Jeffrey Boam said, "George wanted to do a much classier version than I ever imagined it to be. I imagined it to be a little cruder, more low-brow humor, rougher and more like the movies Chevy was doing at the time, but George was a classy guy and he wasn’t going to do that ... I think a lot of Chevy’s fans were let down because it wasn’t as raucous and vulgar as they might have expected."

During his later years he taught drama at Yale.

== Personal life and death ==
In the Margaret Webster theatre company, Hill met Louisa Horton, whom he married on April 7, 1951. They later divorced. Hill was survived by Horton, their two sons, including George Roy Hill III and John Hill, two daughters, and 12 grandchildren.

After his second return to civilian life, Hill bought an open-cockpit Waco biplane built in 1930, which he retained until about ten years before his death.

According to a 2012 article in The New Yorker by John Colapinto, Hill handpicked inexperienced 16-year-old actress Tippy Walker from hundreds of actresses who auditioned for the role of "Val" in the 1964 film The World of Henry Orient and then reshaped the film during editing to focus on her character. According to Colapinto, in the 2000s Walker revealed through a series of posts on IMDb that she and Hill began a relationship during filming that lasted throughout most of Walker's senior year in high school, even though Hill was married with children and, at age 44, nearly 30 years older than Walker. In the posts Colapinto attributes to Walker, the retired actress describes being aggressively French-kissed by Hill as a 16-year-old while they were alone in his office. Walker also claimed that Hill swore her to secrecy about the resulting relationship, then himself told others, and she states the resulting Hollywood gossip made potential employers reluctant to cast her, contributing to her decision to stop acting in the early 1970s.

Hill died from complications of Parkinson's disease at his home on the Upper East Side of Manhattan on December 27, 2002, aged 81.

== Filmography ==
Year	Title	Director	Writer	Producer
1962	Period of Adjustment	Yes	No	No
1963	Toys in the Attic	Yes	No	No
1964	The World of Henry Orient	Yes	No	No
1966	Hawaii	Yes	No	No
1967	Thoroughly Modern Millie	Yes	No	No
1969	Butch Cassidy and the Sundance Kid	Yes	No	No
1972	Slaughterhouse-Five	Yes	No	No
1973	The Sting	Yes	No	No
1975	The Great Waldo Pepper	Yes	Yes	Yes
1977	Slap Shot	Yes	No	No
1979	A Little Romance	Yes	Yes	No
1982	The World According to Garp	Yes	No	Yes
1984	The Little Drummer Girl	Yes	Uncredited	No
1988	Funny Farm	Yes	No	No

Actor

- Walk East on Beacon! (1952): Nicholas Wilben
- The World According to Garp (1982): Pilot (uncredited)

== Awards and nominations ==
Awards and nominations received by Roy Hill's films
Year	Title	Academy Awards		BAFTA Awards		Golden Globe Awards	
Year	Title	Nominations	Wins	Nominations	Wins	Nominations	Wins
1962	Period of Adjustment	1				2	
1963	Toys in the Attic	1				2	
1964	The World of Henry Orient					1	
1966	Hawaii	7				3	2
1967	Thoroughly Modern Millie	7	1			5	1
1969	Butch Cassidy and the Sundance Kid	7	4	10	9	4	1
1972	Slaughterhouse-Five					1	
1973	The Sting	10	7			1	
1979	A Little Romance	2	1			2	
1982	The World According to Garp	2					
Total		37	13	10	9	21	4

Academy Awards

Year	Title	Category	Result
1969	Butch Cassidy and the Sundance Kid	Best Director	Nominated
1973	The Sting	Best Director	Won

BAFTA Awards

Year	Title	Category	Result
1969	Butch Cassidy and the Sundance Kid	Best Direction	Won

=== Directed Academy Award Performances ===
These actors have received Academy Award nominations for their performances in Roy Hill's film.

Year	Performer	Film	Result
Academy Award for Best Actor
1974	Robert Redford	The Sting	Nominated
Academy Award for Best Supporting Actor
1983	John Lithgow	The World According to Garp	Nominated
Academy Award for Best Supporting Actress
1967	Jocelyne LaGarde	Hawaii	Nominated
1968	Carol Channing	Thoroughly Modern Millie	Nominated
1983	Glenn Close	The World According to Garp	Nominated

== See also ==
- George Roy Hill filmography
