= Walk East on Beacon =

1952 film by Alfred L. Werker

Walk East on Beacon!
- Theatrical release poster
- Directed by: Alfred L. Werker
- Written by: Leo Rosten; Virginia Shaler; Laurence Heath; Emmett Murphy
- Based on: The Crime of the Century by J. Edgar Hoover
- Produced by: Louis De Rochemont
- Starring: George Murphy; Finlay Currie; Virginia Gilmore
- Cinematography: Joseph C. Brun
- Edited by: Angelo Ross
- Music by: Jack Shaindlin; Louis Applebaum (uncredited)
- Distributed by: Columbia Pictures
- Release date: April 29, 1952
- Running time: 98 minutes
- Country: United States
- Language: English
- Box office: $1.35 million (US rentals)

Walk East on Beacon is a 1952 American film noir drama film directed by Alfred L. Werker and starring George Murphy, Finlay Currie, and Virginia Gilmore. It was released by Columbia Pictures. The screenplay was inspired by a May 1951 Reader's Digest article by J. Edgar Hoover entitled "The Crime of the Century: The Case of the A-Bomb Spies." The article covers the meeting of German physicist and atomic spy Klaus Fuchs and American chemist Harry Gold as well as details of the Soviet espionage network in the United States. Gold's testimony would later lead to the case against Julius and Ethel Rosenberg for treason. The film substitutes real atomic spying with vague top secret scientific programs. Extensive location shooting was done in New England, around Washington Union Station and in FBI laboratories.

== Plot ==
Federal agent Belden is assigned to locate the communist mastermind behind the leak, and to trace all avenues of informational access utilized by the Communists. Professor Albert Kafer is the space-weapons scientist who is being forced by the Soviets into cooperating with them, as his son is under threat, while Alexi Laschenkov is the top Eastern-Bloc spy.

Using state of the art technology, such as an early miniature video camera, and ingenious methods like a roomful of foreign language lip readers, the G-men crack the case and with the help of the US Coast Guard rescue the professor before he can be spirited away by submarine.

== Cast ==
- George Murphy as Inspector James 'Jim' Belden
- Finlay Currie as Professor Albert Kafer
- Virginia Gilmore as Millie Sulenko / Teresa Zalenko
- Karel Stepanek as Alexi Laschenkov / Gregory Anders
- Louisa Horton as Mrs. Elaine Wilben
- Peter Capell as Chris Zalenko / Gino
- Bruno Wick as Luther Danzig
- Jack Manning as Melvin Foss / Vincent
- Karl Weber as FBI Agent Charlie Reynolds
- Robert A. Dunn as Dr. Wincott (as Rev. Robert Dunn)
- Vilma Kurer as Mrs. Rita Foss
- Michael Garrettas Michael Dorndoff / Frank Torrance
- Lotte Palfi Andor as Mrs. Anna Kafer (as Lotte Palfi)
- Ernest Graves as Robert Martin
- Robert Carroll as Boldany
- George Roy Hill as Nicholas Wilben
- Helen Mitchell as one of the lip readers
- Westbrook Van Voorhis as the narrator (uncredited)

== Comic book adaption ==
- Fawcett Motion Picture Comics #113 (November 1952) A PDF copy is included as a Bonus Feature on the Sony Pictures Home Entertainment 2013 DVD of the film.

== Critical response ==
Alden Whitman of The New York Times wrote: "There should be no doubt at this point that Communist espionage is an insidious but definite menace and the F. B. I. is ever alert to thwart these underground forces if Walk East on Beacon is any criterion. But this latest entry in a long line of film exposes of scientific sleuthing produced by Louis de Rochemont in his typical, documentary fashion is serious spy-chasing adventure which, oddly enough, suffers somewhat because of its late arrival."
