= Keep Our Honor Bright =

- Kraft Television Theatre episode
- Episode no.: Season 7 Episode 7
- Directed by: Maury Holland
- Written by: George Roy Hill
- Original air date: October 14, 1953
- Running time: 54 minutes

Guest appearances
- Michael Higgins as Matt Matthewson; Joan Potter as Sally; Larry Fletcher as Mr. Matthewson; James Dean as Jim Cooper

Episode chronology
← Previous "Cap'n Jonas"	Next → "The Picket Fence"

"Keep Our Honor Bright" was an American television play broadcast live on October 14, 1953, as part of the NBC television series, Kraft Television Theatre. It was the 333rd episode of Kraft Television Theater. George Roy Hill wrote the teleplay. The production was one of the early screen appearances of James Dean who died less than two years later.

== Plot ==
=== Act I ===
A group of college students attend a party at the Matthewson home. Sally learns that she has passed her classes. Her boyfriend Matt Matthewson tells her he has been invited to be a junior partner in his father's firm and proposes marriage.

Matt is called away to a special meeting of the college's student honor committee. Jim Cooper (played by James Dean) was caught cheating on the final exams. Matt is the chairman of the committee and questions Jim. Jim admits cheating on the biology exam. He was in the mimeograph room and found a copy of the exam in the waste basket. He took it with him. At first, he denies sharing it with anyone else. After debate, the committee votes in favor of recommending to the dean that Jim be expelled.

On being told of the vote, Jim says there were others who cheated by using his copy of the exam. The committee agrees that, if Jim discloses all the names, they will recommend that all of the cheaters be given another chance to take the exam. Jim writes down the names.

Matt returns to the party. He tells Sally that Jim identified her as one of the cheaters. She admits it.

=== Act II ===
Matt learns from a reporter that Jim took an overdose of sleeping pills. Jim left a note that he and a lot of others were caught cheating. Matt is worried there will be a big public scandal. Sally wants to visit Jim in the hospital, and Matt tries to persuade her not to.

Sally visits Jim and gives him a toy. Jim admits that he was the source of the names. Jim is distraught over turning everyone in and having to face his parents.

Matt watches coverage of the scandal on the television. Mr. Matthewson says he cheated in college but never got caught. He says it's getting caught that matters and advises Matt to protect Sally. He urges Matt to persuade Jim to recant his inclusion of Sally on the list. Matt initially resists, but his father urges him to use whatever methods are necessary and not lecture him about what's right and wrong.

Matt meets with the dean and the school's board. The board has a vigorous debate about what action it should take. A petition is presented from students insisting that the cheaters be expelled. The board votes to expel those found to have cheated. The dean asks for the list of cheaters, and Matt turns it over.

Matt tells Sally not to worry. The cheaters are being expelled, but Matt persuaded Jim to take her name off the list. Sally protests and insists on telling the truth to the Dean.

=== Act III ===
Matt receives a letter from Sally on graduation day. He rushes to the train station to see Sally. Matt proposes that they go someplace where nobody knows about the scandal. Sally gets on the train and leaves.

Matt returns to campus to deliver his commencement address. During the address, he pauses after a few seconds. When he resumes, he apologizes and says he's ashamed. He admits he cheated by removing one of the names from the list. He says he doesn't deserve the diploma any more than those who cheated on the test. He leaves the ceremony to find Sally.

== Cast ==
The following performers appeared in the production:

- Ed Herlihy - announcer

Principal characters

- Michael Higgins as Matt Matthewson
- Joan Potter as Sally
- Larry Fletcher as Mr. Matthewson
- James Dean as Jim Cooper

Supporting roles

- Addison Richards as the Dean
- Peter Fernandez as Harry (Student Honor Committee)
- John Dutra as Ross (student who turns in Jim)
- Don Dubbins as Ed (Student Honor Committee)
- Jim Hickman as Bill (Student Honor Committee)
- Cricket Skilling as Tom (Student Honor Committee)
- Jack Finnergan as Ben
- Andy Milligan as Hines
- Edith Gresham as Nurse
- Betty Gibson as Marilyn Biggs
- Larry Elliot as News Analyst
- George Roy Hill as News Commentator
- David White as Mr. Langley (the Board)
- Calvin Thomas as Mr. Stone (the Board)
- Rusty Lane as Mr. Wilson (the Board)
- Richard Bishop as Mr. Baldwin (the Board)
- Graham Denton as Mr. Todd (the Board)
- T. J. Sydney as Porter

"Other Students"

- Diana Hale
- Joan Taylor
- Donald Hernly
- Bradford Dillman
- Hal Hamilton
- Ronald Jacoby
- Robert Stonebridge
- Jan Musiel

== Production ==
The program was broadcast live on October 14, 1953, on the NBC television network. It produced and directed by Maury Holland. George Roy Hill wrote the teleplay.

It has been suggested that, like Arthur Miller's The Crucible, Hill's teleplay was an allegory for McCarthyism and the pressure applied on suspects to confess and name their associates.

In her autobiography, Marion Dougherty recalled casting Dean in the production. She found him "shy and sensitive yet fascinating" and was pleased with his ability to expose his "boyish charm" and "deep-down inner sense of humor" in the production.

In December 1991, the production was included in a James Dean festival presented by American Cinematheque in Los Angeles. It was later remastered and released in 2015 as part of the DVD collection James Dean: The Lost Television Legacy.
