= Child of Our Time (Playhouse 90) =

- Playhouse 90 episode
- Episode no.: Season 3 Episode 18
- Directed by: George Roy Hill
- Written by: Irving Gaynor Neiman (adaptation), Michel del Castillo (book)
- Original air date: February 5, 1959
- Running time: 1:29

Guest appearances
- Robert L. Crawford Jr. as Tanguy; Liliane Montevecchi as the Mother; Maximillian Schell as Gunther

Episode chronology
← Previous "A Quiet Game of Cards"	Next → "The Second Man"

"Child of Our Time" was an American television play broadcast on February 5, 1959 as part of the CBS television series, Playhouse 90. The cast included Robert L. Crawford Jr., Liliane Montevecchi, and Maximilian Schell. George Roy Hill was the director. The teleplay was written by Irving Gaynor Neiman as an adaptation of the book by Michel del Castillo.

== Plot ==
A young Spanish boy, Tanguy, is deprived of childhood by World War II. He is left in France when his mother returns to Spain to oppose the Franco regime.

== Cast ==
The cast includes the following.

- Robert L. Crawford Jr. as Tanguy
- Liliane Montevecchi as the Mother
- Maximilian Schell as Gunther
- George Dolenz as the Father
- Lou Jacobi as Delivol
- Marc Lawrence as Pardo
- Theo Marcuse as Rouge
- John Wengraf as Mr. Cohen
- Ben-Ari as Misha
- Orlando Rodriguez as Firmin
- Rene Korper as Guy
- Naomi Stevens as Nita
- Felipe Turich as the Doctor
- Beppy Devries as the Concierge
- Voytek Dolinski as Antoine
- Guy De Vestel as Dulac
- Peter Coe as Prison Camp NCO
- Harold Dyrenforth as Nazi Interrogator
- Norbert Schiller as Prisoner
- Edgar Barrier as the Mayor
- Bob Duggan as Gendarme
- Armand Alzamora as Underground Agent
- Jean Del Val as Inspector
- Joyce Vanderveen as Red Cross Worker
- Jerry Gaylor as Red Cross Worker
- Bill Schram as Guard
- Otto Reichow as Soldier
- Sam Capano as Cast, Gendarme
- Paul Maxwell as Gendarme
- David Colmans as Maderas
- Pat Ortiz as Chato

== Production ==
The program aired on February 19, 1959, on the CBS television series Playhouse 90. George Roy Hill was the director. The teleplay was written by Irving Gaynor Neiman as an adaptation of the book by Michel del Castillo.
