= Helen Morgan (Playhouse 90) =

- Playhouse 90 episode
- Polly Bergen as Helen Morgan
- Episode no.: Season 1 Episode 33
- Directed by: George Roy Hill
- Written by: Leonard Spigelgass, Paul Monash
- Presented by: Dana Wynter
- Original air date: May 16, 1957
- Running time: 90 minutes

Guest appearances
- Polly Bergen as Helen Morgan; Hoagy Carmichael as Marty Dix; Sylvia Sidney as Lulu Morgan; Robert Lowery as Roy Patterson; Reginald Denny as George White; Ronnie Burns as Bobby Talbot; Lili Gentle as Marilyn Flood; Benay Venuta as Texas Guinan

Episode chronology
| ← Previous "Homeward Borne" | Next → "Winter Dreams" |

"Helen Morgan" is an American television play broadcast on May 16, 1957, as part of the CBS television series, Playhouse 90. It is the thirty-third episode of the first season of Playhouse 90.

The teleplay follows the life of singer Helen Morgan from age seventeen and through her work as a Chicago torch singer, on Broadway in George White's Scandals, and in Show Boat where she gained fame singing "Bill" and "Can't Help Lovin' Dat Man". The production also covers Morgan's alcohol abuse, her three marriages, and her death at age forty-one from cirrhosis of the liver.

Polly Bergen won the Emmy Award for her performance. The production also received Emmy nominations for Program of the Year and best directing by George Roy Hill.

== Plot ==
Prologue : A dusty piano and sounds of "Why Was I Born?" accompany the storyteller explaining it happened here, where only legend and old songs remain.

"She brings back an era...the 'Roaring Twenties' age of jazz, bathtub gin, the Charleston, speakeasies, the raids. All that is Helen Morgan. Legends have sprung up about her, about her career and her men and her baby and her drinking. Legends, not the true story. I want to tell you what did happen. The real story of Helen Morgan as I know it. Because Helen Morgan, well, was my daughter." – Narrator

Illinois 1917 : The band plays "Over There," selling Liberty bonds. Helen finds Frank Piggin, who assures his jealous gal he never saw Helen before. "Seventeen years....You ran away....I always wanted to see my father." Waitressing, Helen's mother Lulu warned against it. Helen, slapping Lulu's pushy boss, convinces Lulu to leave.

Chicago : Helen auditions, singing "Serenade" from Sigmund Romberg's operetta The Student Prince. Hal yells, "Hold it...How old are you honey?" She lies, "Twenty-one." "Experience?" She lies, "Lots." He fails seducing her. Encouraging, pianist Marty Dix says, "She dances." Ogling her legs, Hal hires Helen. A customer praises, "Jazz...straight from New Orleans." Nick brings drinks. Marty introduces Helen to Benny Carter, getting Helen started, singing "I Ain't Got Nobody." She watches Roy Patterson watching.

Palace B.F. Keith's Vaudeville, New York City : The Great War over, Prohibition beginning, Marty finds Helen work with Broomstick Elliot's Four Whisks, touring one year. Afterwards, an unemployed chorus girl, Helen loves Roy, a married stockbroker, frustrating Lulu and Marty. She answers Flo Ziegfeld's chorus call. Helen tells Ziegfeld Follies' girls, Marty contacted "the bootlegger who owns a club...Esposito, 'Bugsy' or 'Mugsy'," who dies by machinegun. Marty arranges a tryout at Billy Rose's Backstage Club. Helen drinks nervously. On piano-top, to be heard and seen in the noisy, crowded joint, singing "Mean to Me," the crowd gradually quiets. "Mr. Mike" orders Helen spotlit. Patrons applaud.

Months later : George White offers Helen "a small singing part" to "understudy Harriet Hudson." The Apollo - George White's Scandals 1925 : On opening night, Hudson gets sick; Helen performs to rave reviews, "Camille on a piano." Another disheartens; "I'm all the ruined women in the world rolled into one." Marty reveals, "my wife died three months after we were married." Tipsy, Helen quarrels, "Get out, Marty." Lulu advises, "Stop wanting what you can't get," (married men). Helen has a good time as a star in her biggest hit, Show Boat, giving unforgettable performances as Julie. After curtain call, she performs at her speakeasy, Chez Morgan, singing "Bill." A bootlegger informs, their booze was hijacked. Roy leaves Helen for a Commerce Department mission in Germany. She suggests following, but Roy calls their affair a mistake. Chez Morgan is raided. "Texas Guinan's the name...spell it right." Helen shares her paddy wagon. Guinan cheers, "Here's to the wagon. I'd rather be in it than on it."

Helen marries, but it fails. Helen "started a party that lasted fourteen years," angering Marty who tells Lulu, "watch these gigolos guzzle your gin....I'll miss you both." Helen drunkenly implores, "come play the piano." Waking naked, Helen wonders where she is. "How's it feel to be Mrs. Bobby Talbot." She cringes, "you poor kid." Partying continues. Helen becomes the biggest Broadway star.

At Hammerstein's Theater, Marilyn Flood, crying, quits, two months pregnant and unwed. Helen offers the best doctors. Three months later, Sweet Adeline is successful, but Helen is killing herself and throwing her money away. Lulu cannot watch her dragging down Bobby, who "quit teaching school" to handle Helen's chores. Lulu admonishes, "Worthless bums sponge off you." Bobby explains quitting; his day begins when she wakes, "I love you." She loves him too; for his sake, newspapers report, "Helen Morgan Divorces Husband." Falling in love again when Marilyn gives her baby daughter to Helen, Lulu seeks legalized adoption. After Helen sings "Can't Help Lovin' Dat Man" at Chez Morgan, Marilyn's lawyer Forbes insists, "We want the baby," threatening an "ugly mess in the newspapers," and proving Helen unfit. Despite paying for delivery, and Marilyn never looking at her newborn, Helen relents. To the press, she drunkenly slurs, "A Broadway star must make the choice between her art and domesticity."

After the crash of 1929, people do not want sad songs. Helen is out of style, sick in heart, and diagnosed with liver disease. The doctor advises Lulu, "make her stop drinking?" More food and bedrest. But Helen tours with Scandals. "One for the road." It becomes "a long road and a tough one. Two a day in Philadelphia, Pittsburgh, Cleveland," and back where she started, Chicago. The Stage Manager complains, Helen is "clocked again." Singing "Why Was I Born?" Marty catches her collapsing, and calls for an ambulance.

Epilogue :

"I don't know the answer. Helen Morgan had everything and nothing. She had a father who deserted her. She had a mother who wasn't strong enough. She had a husband who wasn't mature enough. She had a baby she couldn't keep long enough. Why was she born? Maybe...maybe it was just to sing." – Narrator

The song and the scene ends with the dusty piano.

== Cast ==
Dana Wynter hosted the broadcast, in which the following performers received screen credit.

- Polly Bergen as Helen Morgan
- Hoagy Carmichael as Marty Dix
- Sylvia Sidney as Lulu Morgan
- Robert Lowery as Roy Patterson
- Reginald Denny as George White
- Ronnie Burns as Bobby Talbot
- Lili Gentle as Marilyn Flood
- Benay Venuta as Texas Guinan
- James Westerfield as Frank Piggin, Morgan's father
- Willard Sage as Forbes
- Lewis Charles as Esposito
- Grant Richards as Mike Baxter
- Paul Lambert as Kozek
- Eve McVeagh as Rita
- Glenn Turnbull as Broomstick Elliot
- Dan Frazier as Rally Speaker
- Benny Carter as himself
- Robin Morse as Proprietor
- Alfred Hopson as Customer
- Jimmy Cross as Comic
- Sidney Clute as Mike Monroe
- Jim Nolan as Cop
- Nicky Blair as Bootlegger
- Kerr as Ralph
- Mavis Palmer as Betty
- Burt Nelson as Bouncer
- Don Anderson as Stage Manager
- William Forrest as Doctor

== Production ==
Martin Manulis, the producer of Playhouse 90, purchased the television rights to the story from Morgan's mother, Lulu Morgan. In January 1957, Polly Bergen signed to play the lead role. She had previously been known for making commercials for Pepsi-Cola and as a panelist on "To Tell the Truth."

When Playhouse 90 acquired the television rights, Warner Brothers Pictures was already working on a motion picture version. Warner asked CBS to delay the television broadcast, but CBS declined and announced it would air its version on May 16. The movie, titled The Helen Morgan Story, was released in October.

George Roy Hill directed the production. The teleplay was written by Leonard Spigelgass and Paul Monash, and Lulu Morgan was also given story credit. Albert Heschong was the art director.

The production was nominated for the Emmy Award for Program of the Year, but lost to another Playhouse 90 episode, The Comedian. Polly Bergen won the Emmy Award for best actress. George Roy Hill was also nominated for best direction (one hour or more).

== Music ==
The shows music was arranged and conducted by Luther Henderson Jr. End credits announce a new 1957 Columbia Records album, Bergen Sings Morgan in which Polly Bergen sings twelve of Helen Morgan's greatest songs.

== Reception ==
In The New York Times, Jack Gould wrote that the production "had warmth, nostalgia and poignancy", though the telling of her backstage life "tended at times to be rather over-melodramatic." Gould also wrote that Hoagy Carmichael "dominated all his scenes in his usual effortless manner." As for Polly Bergen, Gould wrote that "her interpretation did not quite come off", though she "gave it a sincere and interesting try."

In The Boston Globe, Mary Cremmen called it "a triumph of home screen entertainment."
