= Alex Horn =

American playwright and actor (1929–2007)

Alex Francis Horn
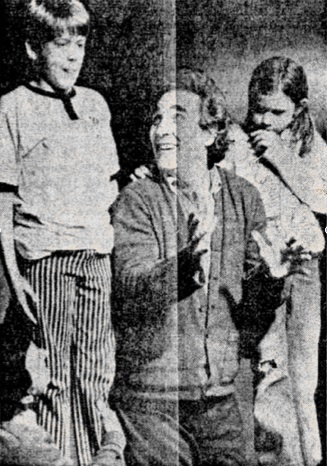
- Horn in 1973
- Born: August 14, 1929; Chicago, Illinois, U.S.
- Died: September 30, 2007 (aged 78)
- Occupation: Cult leader

Alexander Francis Horn (14 August 1929 – 30 September 2007), known also as Alex Horn, was a playwright, author, and an accused cult leader. According to Rick Alan Ross, the group run by Alex Horn and his wife Sharon Gans, was "one of the most secretive groups [he] encountered.”

== Overview ==
Horn and Gans ran the Theatre of All Possibilities until 1978 when the San Francisco Chronicle and San Francisco Progress ran a series of articles accusing the couple of running a cult which abused children, bilked members, and physically abused and verbally abused members. Thereafter, Horn and Gans both left San Francisco and continued to run their groups in New York and Boston, the latter until his death in 2007. Alex Horn had five children with Anne Burrage, Maurice, Elaine, Matthew, Mary Ellen and Benjamin. He died on September 30, 2007.

An article about Alexander Francis Horn, then five years old, appeared in the Chicago Tribune on February 9, 1935. The child Horn was alleged to have spread the alarm for a fire that broke out in his home. 1940 census records show Alexander Horn, aged 10, as an inmate of the Marks Nathan Jewish Orphan Home in Chicago, where he is reported as having lived for the previous five years.

== Plays ==
- The Fantastic Arising of Padraic Clancy Muldoon
- Adam King
- Journey to Jerusalem
- The Argument
- The Legend of Sharon Shashonovah
- The Magician

== Books ==
- Theatre of All Possibilities Vol 1 San Francisco: Everyman Publications 1978
- In Search of a Solar Hero Shaftesbury: Element Books, 1987
- Ponderings of a Citizen of the Milky Way Shaftesbury: Element Books, 1987
- Top Secret Adam King Publisher EVERYMAN 1970 24th and Mission Streets San Francisco CA 94110 285-9009
