= Pond's Theater =

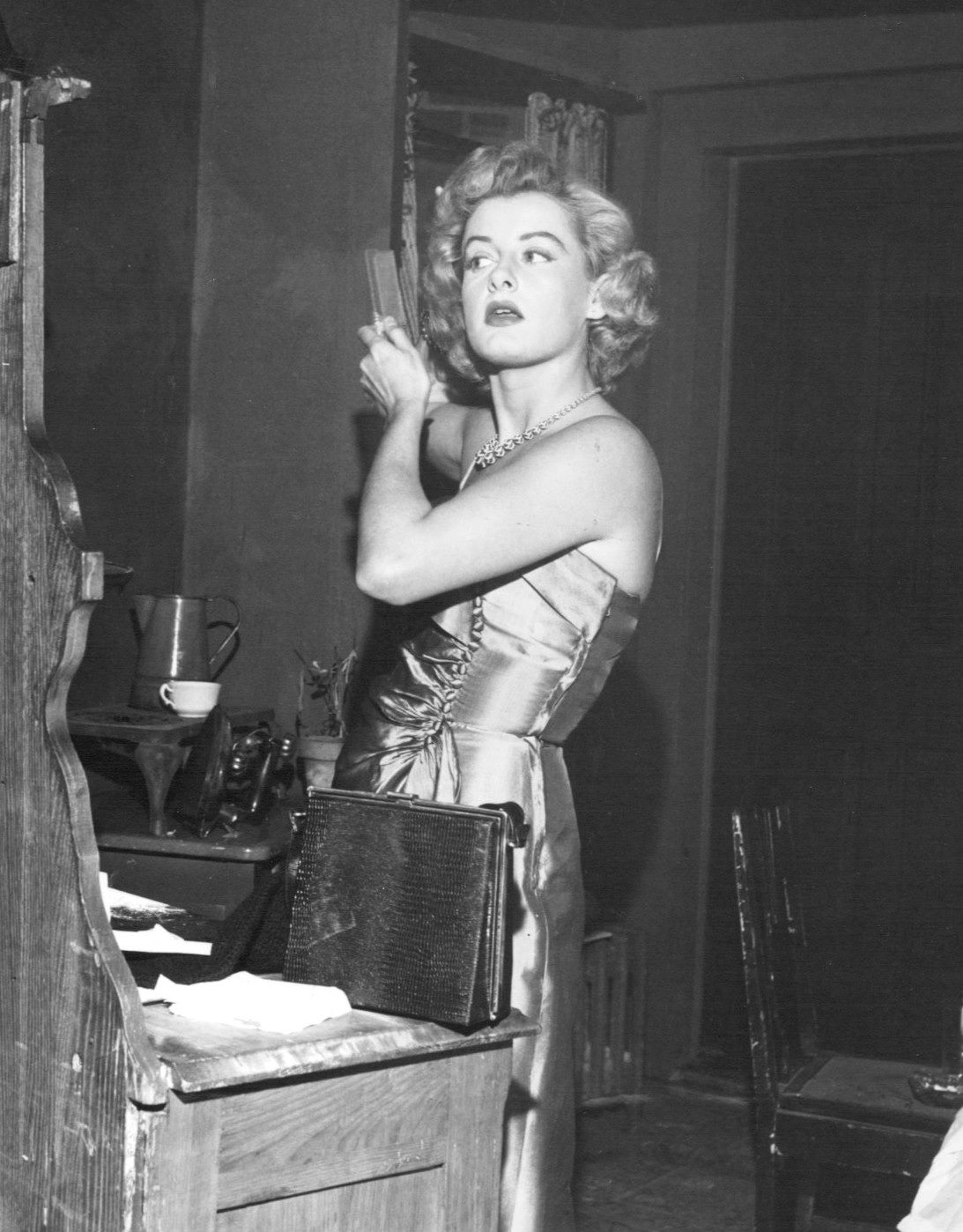
Photo of Constance Ford as Anna Christie from the play of the same name

Pond's Theater is a 60-minute television anthology series sponsored by Pond's Creams that was produced by the J. Walter Thompson Agency on ABC-TV. Its original title was Kraft Television Theatre, but when Kraft decided to drop the Thursday night version on the American Broadcasting Company (ABC) Pond's took over the sponsorship and retitled the series Pond's Theater. Twenty-five episodes aired on ABC from January 13, 1955 to July 7, 1955.

The series had its origin in the second simultaneous series of Kraft Television Theatre begun October 1953, on ABC to promote Kraft's new Cheez Whiz product. When the sponsorship came to an end in January 1955, then Pond's picked up the second Kraft Theatre franchise, while the first Kraft Theatre continued to run on NBC-TV. Both series followed the sponsorship format also used by Ford Theatre and Eastman Kodak's Screen Directors Playhouse. The series was produced by J. Walter Thompson at ABC. Directors included Fielder Cook and Roy Boulting.

== Reception ==
Reviewer John Crosby, in a March 31, 1955 article entitled "Pond's Theatre Delivers Satisfying Dramatic Fare" commented that:

"Pond's Theater doesn't do that well because its on a Thursday, and because it's on ABC-TV, which can't deliver the stations. But it does all right, and in less than three months has done some, very interesting plays."

== Cast ==
Among its guest stars that year were Sidney Poitier, Joanne Woodward, John Cassavetes, Gena Rowlands, Roddy McDowall, Gene Raymond, Sylvia Sidney, Buster Crabbe, E.G. Marshall, Eva Gabor, Ed Begley, and Mildred Dunnock.

=== Selected episodes ===
- Anna Christie
