= 1958 Sylvania Television Awards =

Sylvania Award
- Sponsored by: Sylvania Electric Products
- Date: January 22, 1959
- Location: New York City
- Country: United States

The 1958 Sylvania Television Awards were presented on January 22, 1959, at the Plaza Hotel in New York City. The Sylvania Awards were established by Sylvania Electric Products.

The 31-member panel that decided the winners was chaired by Deems Taylor and also included Marvin Barrett, television editor of Newsweek; Kenneth Bartlett of Syracuse University; pitcher Bob Feller; Judge Samuel S. Leibowitz; actor and playwright Elliott Nugent; actress and author Cornelius Oits Skinner; and lawyer and writer Telford Taylor.

== Nominees ==
The programs nominated for "Outstanding Telecast" included The Plot to Kill Stalin; the Moiseyev Dancers on The Ed Sullivan Show; An Evening with Fred Astaire; Little Moon of Alban; All the King's Men on Kraft Television Theatre; The Bridge of San Luis Rey on DuPont Show of the Month; and the episode "African Adventure" from Lowell Thomas's High Adventure.

The nominees for outstanding actor included Paul Muni in The Last Clear Chance; Melvyn Douglas in The Plot to Kill Stalin; Neville Brand in All the King's Men; and Fredric March in The Winslow Boy.

The nominees for outstanding actress included Rosalind Russell in Wonderful Town; Piper Laurie in Days of Wine and Roses; Julie Harris in Little Moon of Alban; and Judith Anderson and Viveca Lindfors in The Bridge on San Luis Rey.

== Winners ==
The winners were:

- Outstanding telecast - Little Moon of Alban, Hallmark Hall of Fame (NBC)
- Outstanding dramatic program - Little Moon of Alban
- Outstanding performance by an actress - Julie Harris for Little Moon of Alban
- Outstanding performance by an actor - Neville Brand, All the King's Men
- Best supporting performance by an actress - Maureen Stapleton, All the King's Men
- Best supporting performance by an actor - Oscar Homolka as Nikita Khrushchev in The Plot to Kill Stalin, Playhouse 90
- Original original teleplay - James Costigan, Little Moon of Alban
- Outstanding variety show - Bob Hope's Moscow show
- Outstanding comedy show - The Sid Caesar Show
- Light musical show - An Evening with Fred Astaire
- Outstanding documentary program - The Face of Red China (CBS) and coverage of the coronation of Pope John XXIII (CBS)
- Outstanding documentary series - The Twentieth Century
- Outstanding news and special events program - live telecast of the Explorer launch (NBC)
- Outstanding contributions to serious music in television - Leonard Bernstein for programs on two networks
- Best comedy writing - John Vlahos for The Beaver Patrol, U.S. Steel Hour
- TV adaptation - Ludi Claire for The Bridge of San Luis Rey
- Outstanding children's program - Art Carney Meets Peter and the Wolf
- Outstanding public service program - NBC's Continental Classroom
- Merit citation - Rome Eternal on the Catholic Hour
- Outstanding religious series - Frontiers of Faith, Catholic Hour, and Eternal Light
