= 11th Primetime Emmy Awards =

1959 American television programming awards

- Date: May 6, 1959
- Location: Moulin Rouge Nightclub, Hollywood, California
- Presented by: Academy of Television Arts and Sciences
- Hosted by: Raymond Burr

Highlights
- Most awards: An Evening with Fred Astaire (5)
- Most nominations: Playhouse 90 (14)
- Best Comedy Series: The Jack Benny Show
- Best Dramatic Series - Less Than One Hour: Alcoa-Goodyear Theatre
- Best Dramatic Series - One Hour or Longer: Playhouse 90
- Best Musical or Variety Series: The Dinah Shore Chevy Show
- Best Special Dramatic Program - One Hour or More: Hallmark Hall of Fame: "Little Moon of Alban"

Television/radio coverage
- Network: NBC

The 11th Emmy Awards, later referred to as the 11th Primetime Emmy Awards, were held on May 6, 1959, to honor the best in television of the year. The ceremony was held at the Moulin Rouge Nightclub in Hollywood, California. It was hosted by Raymond Burr. All nominations are listed, with winners in bold and series' networks are in parentheses.

For the first time in Emmy history, all major categories were split into genre-specific fields, this would become standard for later ceremonies. The top show of the night was the NBC special, An Evening with Fred Astaire, it tied the record of five major wins. Father Knows Best also set a milestone, becoming the first show to be nominated in every major category (series, writing, directing, and the four major acting categories).

== Winners and nominees ==
Winners are listed first, highlighted in boldface, and indicated with a double dagger (‡).

=== Programs ===
Programs
**Best Comedy Series**: **The Jack Benny Show (CBS)**‡; The Bob Cummings Show (NBC); The Danny Thomas Show (CBS); Father Knows Best (CBS / NBC); The Phil Silvers Show (CBS); The Red Skelton Show (CBS)	**Best Dramatic Series Less than One Hour**: **Alcoa-Goodyear Theatre (NBC)**‡; Alfred Hitchcock Presents (CBS); General Electric Theater (CBS); The Loretta Young Show (NBC); Naked City (ABC); Peter Gunn (NBC)
**Best Dramatic Series One Hour or Longer**: **Playhouse 90 (CBS)**‡; The United States Steel Hour (CBS)	**Best Musical or Variety Series**: **The Dinah Shore Chevy Show (NBC)**‡; The Perry Como Show (NBC); The Steve Allen Show (NBC)
**Best Public Service Program or Series**: **Omnibus (NBC)**‡; Bold Journey (ABC); Meet the Press (NBC); Small World (CBS); The Twentieth Century (CBS); New York Philharmonic: Young People's Concerts (CBS)	**Best Western Series**: **Maverick (ABC)**‡; Gunsmoke (CBS); Have Gun – Will Travel (CBS); The Rifleman (ABC); Wagon Train (NBC)
**Best Panel, Quiz or Audience Participation Series**: **What's My Line? (CBS)**‡; I've Got a Secret (CBS); Keep Talking (CBS); The Price Is Right (NBC); This Is Your Life (NBC); You Bet Your Life (NBC)	**Best Special Musical or Variety Program - One Hour or Longer**: **An Evening with Fred Astaire (NBC)**‡; Art Carney Meets Peter and the Wolf (ABC)
**Most Outstanding Single Program of the Year**: **An Evening with Fred Astaire (NBC)**‡; Hallmark Hall of Fame: "Little Moon of Alban" (NBC); Playhouse 90: "Child of Our Time" (CBS); Playhouse 90: "Old Man" (CBS)	**Best Special Dramatic Program - One Hour or More**: **Hallmark Hall of Fame: "Little Moon of Alban" (NBC)**‡; DuPont Show of the Month: "The Bridge of San Luis Rey" (CBS); DuPont Show of the Month: "Hamlet" (CBS); DuPont Show of the Month: "The Hasty Heart" (CBS); Hallmark Hall of Fame: "Johnny Belinda" (NBC)

=== Acting ===
==== Lead performances ====
Lead performances
**Best Performance by an Actor (Continuing Character) in a Musical or Variety Series**: **Perry Como – The Perry Como Show as himself (CBS)**‡; Steve Allen – The Steve Allen Show as himself (NBC); Jack Paar – Tonight Starring Jack Paar as himself (NBC)	**Best Performance by an Actress (Continuing Character) in a Musical or Variety Series**: **Dinah Shore – The Dinah Shore Chevy Show as herself (NBC)**‡; Patti Page – The Patti Page Oldsmobile Show as herself (ABC)
**Best Actor in a Leading Role (Continuing Character) in a Comedy Series**: **Jack Benny – The Jack Benny Show as Jack Benny (NBC)**‡; Walter Brennan – The Real McCoys as Grandpa Amos McCoy (ABC); Bob Cummings – The Bob Cummings Show as Bob Collins (NBC); Phil Silvers – The Phil Silvers Show as MSgt. Ernest G. Bilko (CBS); Danny Thomas – The Danny Thomas Show as Danny Williams (ABC / CBS); Robert Young – Father Knows Best as Jim Anderson (CBS / NBC)	**Best Actress in a Leading Role (Continuing Character) in a Comedy Series**: **Jane Wyatt – Father Knows Best as Margaret Anderson (CBS / NBC)**‡; Gracie Allen – The George Burns and Gracie Allen Show as Gracie Allen (CBS); Spring Byington – December Bride as Lily Ruskin (CBS); Ida Lupino – Mr. Adams and Eve as Eve Drake (CBS); Donna Reed – The Donna Reed Show as Donna Stone (ABC); Ann Sothern – The Ann Sothern Show as Katy O'Connor (CBS)
**Best Actor in a Leading Role (Continuing Character) in a Dramatic Series**: **Raymond Burr – Perry Mason as Perry Mason (CBS)**‡; James Arness – Gunsmoke as Matt Dillon (CBS); Richard Boone – Have Gun – Will Travel as Paladin (CBS); James Garner – Maverick as Bret Maverick (ABC); Craig Stevens – Peter Gunn as Peter Gunn (NBC); Efrem Zimbalist Jr. – 77 Sunset Strip as Stuart Bailey (ABC)	**Best Actress in a Leading Role (Continuing Character) in a Dramatic Series**: **Loretta Young – The Loretta Young Show as herself (NBC)**‡; Phyllis Kirk – The Thin Man as Nora Charles (NBC); June Lockhart – Lassie as Ruth Martin (CBS); Jane Wyman – Fireside Theatre as herself (NBC)

==== Supporting performances ====
Supporting performances
**Best Supporting Actor (Continuing Character) in a Comedy Series**: **Tom Poston – The Steve Allen Show as himself (NBC)**‡; Richard Crenna – The Real McCoys as Luke McCoy (ABC); Paul Ford – The Phil Silvers Show as Col. John T. Hall (CBS); Maurice Gosfield – The Phil Silvers Show as Pvt. Duane Doberman (CBS); Billy Gray – Father Knows Best as Bud (CBS / NBC); Harry Morgan – December Bride as Pete Porter (CBS)	**Best Supporting Actress (Continuing Character) in a Comedy Series**: **Ann B. Davis – The Bob Cummings Show as Charmaine Schultz (NBC)**‡; Rosemary DeCamp – The Bob Cummings Show as Margaret MacDonald (NBC); Elinor Donahue – Father Knows Best as Betty (CBS / NBC); Verna Felton – December Bride as Hilda Crocker (CBS); Kathleen Nolan – The Real McCoys as Kate McCoy (ABC); Zasu Pitts – The Gale Storm Show as Susanna Pomeroy (CBS)
**Best Supporting Actor (Continuing Character) in a Dramatic Series**: **Dennis Weaver – Gunsmoke as Chester (CBS)**‡; Herschel Bernardi – Peter Gunn as Lt. Jacoby (NBC); Johnny Crawford – The Rifleman as Mark McCain (ABC); William Hopper – Perry Mason as Paul Drake (CBS)	**Best Supporting Actress (Continuing Character) in a Dramatic Series**: **Barbara Hale – Perry Mason as Della Street (CBS)**‡; Lola Albright – Peter Gunn as Edie Hart (NBC); Amanda Blake – Gunsmoke as Kitty (CBS); Hope Emerson – Peter Gunn as Mother (NBC)

==== Single performances ====
Single performances
**Best Single Performance by an Actor**: **Fred Astaire – An Evening with Fred Astaire as himself (NBC)**‡; Robert Crawford Jr. – Playhouse 90: "Child of Our Time" as Tanguy (CBS); Paul Muni – Playhouse 90: "Last Clear Chance" as Sam Arlen (CBS); Christopher Plummer – Hallmark Hall of Fame: "Little Moon of Alban" as Kenneth Boyd (NBC); Mickey Rooney – Alcoa-Goodyear Theatre: "Eddie" as Eddie (NBC); Rod Steiger – Playhouse 90: "A Town Has Turned to Dust" as Harvey Denton (CBS)	**Best Single Performance by an Actress**: **Julie Harris – Hallmark Hall of Fame: "Little Moon of Alban" as Bridgid Mary (NBC)**‡; Judith Anderson – The DuPont Show of the Month: "The Bridge of San Luis Rey" as Marquesa de Montemayor (CBS); Helen Hayes – The United States Steel Hour: "One Red Rose for Christmas" as Mother Seraphim (CBS); Piper Laurie – Playhouse 90: "Days of Wine and Roses" as Kirsten Clay (CBS); Geraldine Page – Playhouse 90: "Old Man" as the Young Woman (CBS); Maureen Stapleton – Kraft Television Theatre: "All the King's Men" as Sadie Burke (NBC)

=== Directing ===
Directing
**Best Direction of a Single Musical or Variety Program**: **An Evening with Fred Astaire – Bud Yorkin (NBC)**‡; The Perry Como Show – Clark Jones (NBC); Pontiac Star Parade – Joseph Cates and Gower Champion (NBC)	**Best Direction of a Single Program of a Comedy Series**: **Father Knows Best: "Medal for Margaret" – Peter Tewksbury (CBS)**‡; The Danny Thomas Show: "Pardon My Accent" – Sheldon Leonard (CBS); The Jack Benny Show: "Gary Cooper" – Seymour Berns (CBS); Mr. Adams and Eve: "The Interview" – Richard Kinon (CBS); The Real McCoys: "Kate's Career" – Hy Averback (ABC)
**Best Direction of a Single Program of a Dramatic Series Less Than One Hour**: **Alcoa-Goodyear Theatre: "Eddie" – Jack Smight (NBC)**‡; Alfred Hitchcock Presents: "Lamb to the Slaughter" – Alfred Hitchcock (CBS); General Electric Theater: "Kid at the Stick" – James Neilson (CBS); General Electric Theater: "One Is a Wanderer" – Herschel Daugherty (CBS); Peter Gunn: "The Kill" – Blake Edwards (NBC)	**Best Direction of a Single Dramatic Program - One Hour or Longer**: **Hallmark Hall of Fame: "Little Moon of Alban" – George Schaefer (NBC)**‡; Playhouse 90: "Child of Our Time" – George Roy Hill (CBS); Playhouse 90: "A Town Has Turned to Dust" – John Frankenheimer (CBS)

=== Writing ===
Writing
**Best Writing of a Single Musical or Variety Program**: **An Evening with Fred Astaire – Herbert Baker and Bud Yorkin (NBC)**‡; Art Carney Meets Peter and the Wolf – A.J. Russell (ABC); The Perry Como Show – Goodman Ace, Mort Green, George Foster and Jay Burton (NBC); The Sid Caesar Show – Larry Gelbart and Woody Allen (NBC); The Steve Allen Show – Leonard Stern, Stan Burns, Herbert Sargent, Bill Dana, Don Hinkley, Hal Goodman and Larry Klein (NBC)	**Best Writing of a Single Program of a Comedy Series**: **The Jack Benny Show: "Ernie Kovacs" – George Balzer, Hal Goldman, Sam Perrin and Al Gordon (CBS)**‡; The Bob Cummings Show: "Grandpa Clobbers the Air Force" – Paul Henning and Dick Wesson (NBC); Father Knows Best: "Medal for Margaret" – Roswell Rogers (CBS); The Phil Silvers Show: "Bilko's Vampire" – Billy Friedberg, Arnie Rosen and Coleman Jacoby (CBS); The Real McCoys: "Once There Was a Traveling Salesman" – Bill Manhoff (ABC)
**Best Writing of a Single Program of a Dramatic Series Less Than One Hour**: **Alcoa-Goodyear Theatre: "Eddie" – Alfred Brenner and Ken Hughes (NBC)**‡; Alcoa-Goodyear Theatre: "The Loudmouth" – Christopher Knopf (NBC); Alfred Hitchcock Presents: "Lamb to the Slaughter" – Roald Dahl (CBS); General Electric Theater: "One Is a Wanderer" – Samuel A. Taylor (CBS); Peter Gunn: "The Kill" – Blake Edwards (NBC)	**Best Writing of a Single Dramatic Program One Hour or Longer**: **Hallmark Hall of Fame: "Little Moon of Alban" – James Costigan (NBC)**‡; Playhouse 90: "Child of Our Time" – Irving G. Neiman (CBS); Playhouse 90: "Days of Wine and Roses" – J.P. Miller (CBS); Playhouse 90: "Old Man" – Horton Foote (CBS); Playhouse 90: "A Town Has Turned to Dust" – Rod Serling (CBS)

== Most major nominations ==
Networks with multiple major nominations (Note: "Major" constitutes the categories listed above: Program, Acting, Directing, and Writing. Does not include the technical categories.)
Network	Number of Nominations
CBS	69
NBC	57
ABC	16

Programs with multiple major nominations
Program	Category	Network	Number of Nominations
Playhouse 90	Drama	CBS	14
Father Knows Best	Comedy	CBS/NBC	7
Peter Gunn	Drama	NBC	7
Little Moon of Alban	Drama	NBC	6
Alcoa-Goodyear Theatre	Drama	NBC	5
The Bob Cummings Show	Comedy	NBC	5
An Evening with Fred Astaire	Musical/Variety	NBC	5
The Phil Silvers Show	Comedy	CBS	5
The Real McCoys	Comedy	ABC	5
General Electric Theater	Drama	CBS	4
Gunsmoke	Western	CBS	4
The Jack Benny Show	Comedy	CBS	4
The Perry Como Show	Musical/Variety	NBC	4
The Steve Allen Show	Musical/Variety	NBC	4
Alfred Hitchcock Presents	Drama	CBS	3
The Danny Thomas Show	Comedy	CBS	3
December Bride	Comedy	CBS	3
Perry Mason	Drama	CBS	3
Art Carney Meets Peter and the Wolf	Musical/Variety	ABC	2
The Bridge of San Luis Rey	Drama	CBS	2
The Dinah Shore Chevy Show	Musical/Variety	NBC	2
Have Gun – Will Travel	Western	CBS	2
The Loretta Young Show	Drama	NBC	2
Maverick	Western	ABC	2
Mr. Adams and Eve	Comedy	CBS	2
The Rifleman	Western	ABC	2
The United States Steel Hour	Drama	CBS	2

== Most major awards ==
Networks with multiple major awards
Network	Number of Awards
NBC	19
CBS	10

Programs with multiple major awards
Program	Category	Network	Number of Awards
An Evening with Fred Astaire	Musical/Variety	NBC	5
Little Moon of Alban	Drama	NBC	4
Alcoa-Goodyear Theatre	Drama	NBC	3
The Jack Benny Show	Comedy	CBS	3
The Dinah Shore Chevy Show	Musical/Variety	NBC	2
Father Knows Best	Comedy	CBS	2
Perry Mason	Drama	CBS	2
