= Days of Wine and Roses (film) =

1962 film by Blake Edwards

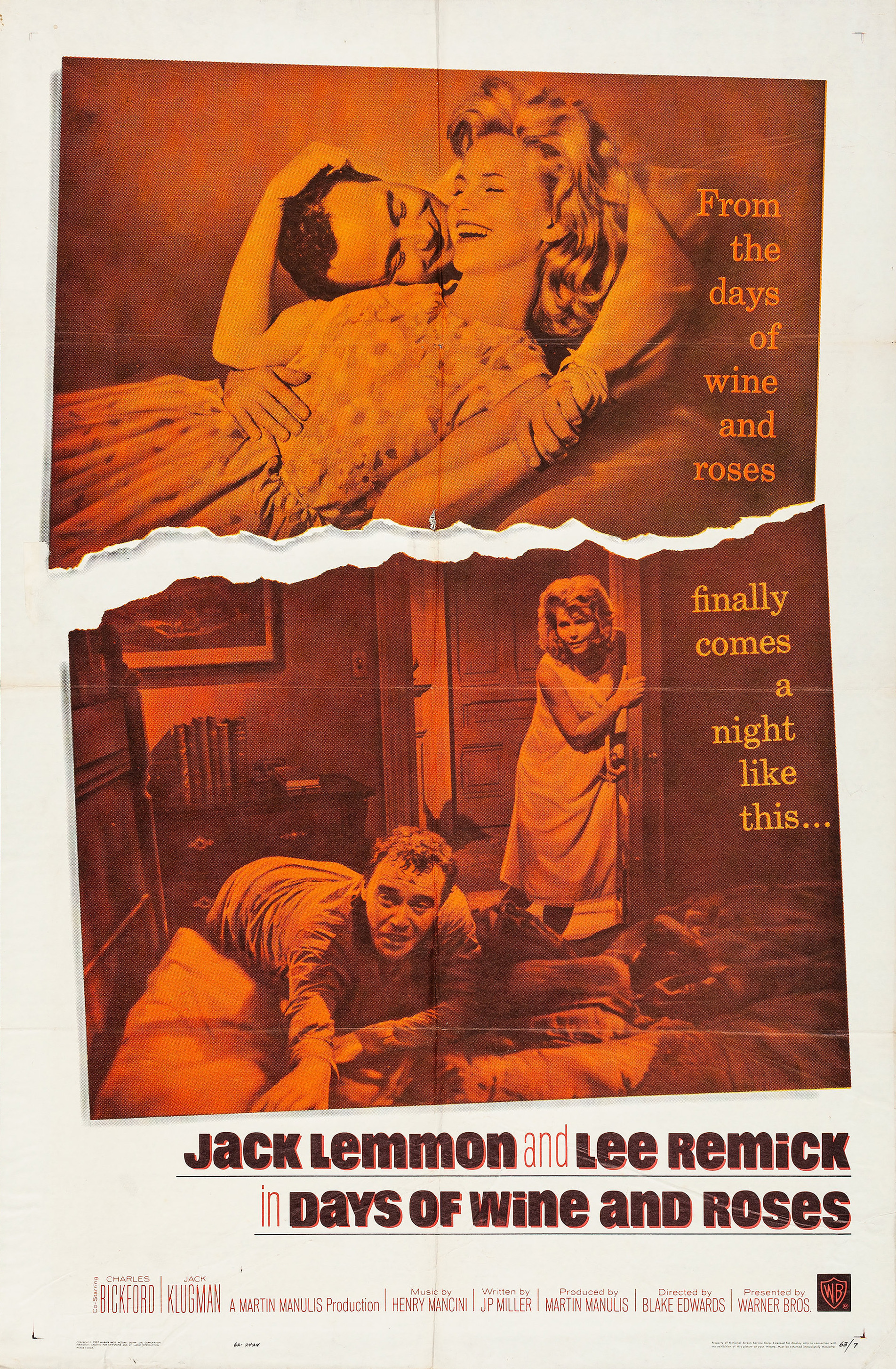
- Theatrical release poster
- Directed by: Blake Edwards
- Screenplay by: JP Miller
- Based on: Days of Wine and Roses by JP Miller
- Produced by: Martin Manulis
- Starring: Jack Lemmon; Lee Remick; Charles Bickford; Jack Klugman; Alan Hewitt
- Cinematography: Philip H. Lathrop
- Edited by: Patrick McCormack
- Music by: Henry Mancini
- Production company: Jalem Productions
- Distributed by: Warner Bros. Pictures
- Release date: December 26, 1962 (United States)
- Running time: 117 minutes
- Country: United States
- Language: English
- Budget: $2 million
- Box office: $8.1 million (US/Canada)

Days of Wine and Roses is a 1962 American romantic drama film directed by Blake Edwards with a screenplay by JP Miller adapted from his own 1958 Playhouse 90 teleplay of the same name. The film was produced by Martin Manulis in co-operation with Lemmon's Jalem Productions (the first for his independent film production company), with music by Henry Mancini, and stars Jack Lemmon and Lee Remick, with supporting roles by Charles Bickford and Jack Klugman. The film depicts the downward spiral of two average Americans who succumb to alcoholism and their repeated attempts to deal with their problems.

An Academy Award went to the film's theme music, composed by Mancini with lyrics by Johnny Mercer. The film received four other Oscar nominations, including Best Actor and Best Actress. In 2018, Days of Wine and Roses was selected for preservation in the United States National Film Registry as being "culturally, historically, or aesthetically significant."

== Plot ==
San Francisco public relations executive Joe Clay meets secretary Kirsten Arnesen. At first, he mistakes her for a call girl, but then when he learns she is a client's secretary, he tries to apologize and court her but she brushes him off. Eventually she warms to him and they begin dating. Kirsten is a teetotaler until Joe introduces her to social drinking. She is initially reluctant, but after her first few Brandy Alexanders, she admits that having a drink makes her "feel good." Despite the misgivings of Kirsten's father, who runs a San Mateo plant nursery and landscaping business, they marry and have a daughter, Debbie.

Joe and Kirsten slowly go from the "two-martini lunch" to full-blown alcoholism. Joe is demoted due to poor performance, and is sent out of town to work on a minor account. Kirsten is alone with their daughter all day and finds drinking the best way to pass the time. While drunk one afternoon, she causes a fire in their apartment that almost kills her and Debbie. Eventually, Joe is fired, and he spends the next several years going from job to job.

One day, Joe sees his reflection in a bar window and realizes in horror that he hardly knows his own face. He tells Kirsten that they must stop drinking, and while not keen on the idea, she agrees. Seeking escape from their addiction, Joe and Kirsten work together in Arnesen's business and stay sober for two months. But the urge is too strong, and during a late-night drinking binge, Joe destroys his father-in-law's greenhouse while looking for a stashed liquor bottle.

Joe is committed to a sanitarium, where he suffers from delirium tremens while confined in a straitjacket. After his release, Joe finally gets sober with the help of Alcoholics Anonymous, a dedicated sponsor named Jim Hungerford, and regular AA meetings. Jim explains to Joe how alcoholics often demonstrate obsessive behavior, pointing out that Kirsten's previous passion for chocolate may have been the first sign of an addictive personality. He advises Joe that most drinkers hate to drink alone or in the company of sober people.

Meanwhile, Kirsten's drinking persists, and she disappears for several days without contacting Joe. She is eventually located at a nearby motel, drunk, but when Joe tries to help her, he ends up drinking again. When their supply runs out, Joe happens upon a liquor store that has closed for the night. He breaks in and steals a bottle but trips and is taunted by the store owner. The result is another trip to the sanitarium, where he is stripped down and tied to a treatment table. Jim appears at his side and warns him that he must keep sober no matter what, even if that means staying away from Kirsten.

Joe finally gets sober, becomes a responsible father to Debbie, and holds down a steady job. He tries to make amends to his father-in-law by offering him payment for past debts and wrongs, but Arnesen accuses him of being indirectly responsible for Kirsten's alcoholism. After calming down, Arnesen says that Kirsten has been disappearing for long periods and is picking up strangers in bars.

One night, Kirsten, shakily sober for two days, comes to Joe's apartment to attempt a reconciliation. Joe tells her she is welcome back anytime if she stops drinking, saying he will not abandon sobriety for her or anything else. Despite acknowledging she can't stop, Kirsten refuses to admit she is an alcoholic and suggests Joe give up on her before leaving.

Joe fights the urge to go after her, calling her name as she turns away to walk to a bar. His cries wake a sleeping Debbie, who asks if Kirsten is coming back. Joe tells her Kirsten is sick and, after deflecting her questions about Kirsten "getting well," stares out at the empty street, the bar's flashing neon sign reflected in the window.

== Cast ==
- Jack Lemmon as Joe Clay
- Lee Remick as Kirsten Clay
- Charles Bickford as Ellis Arnesen
- Jack Klugman as Jim Hungerford
- Alan Hewitt as Rad Leland
- Tom Palmer as Ballefoy
- Debbie Megowan as Debbie Clay
- Maxine Stuart as Dottie
- Jack Albertson as Trayner
- Ken Lynch as Liquor Store Proprietor
- Katherine Squire as Mrs. Nolan

== Production ==
=== Background ===
JP Miller found his title in the 1896 poem "Vitae Summa Brevis Spem Nos Vetat Incohare Longam" by the English writer Ernest Dowson (1867–1900): It also inspired the title song written by Henry Mancini and Johnny Mercer.

They are not long, the weeping and the laughter,
Love and desire and hate;
I think they have no portion in us after
We pass the gate.

They are not long, the days of wine and roses:
Out of a misty dream
Our path emerges for a while, then closes
Within a dream.

Johnny Mercer had also written the lyrics for the theme from Laura, a 1944 film in which Dowson's poem is quoted in its entirety.

Miller's teleplay for Playhouse 90, also titled Days of Wine and Roses, had received favorable critical attention and was nominated for an Emmy Award in the category Best Writing of a Single Dramatic Program - One Hour or Longer. Manulis, a Playhouse 90 producer, decided the material was ideal for a movie. Some critics observed that the movie lacked the impact of the original television production, which starred Cliff Robertson as Joe and Piper Laurie as Kirsten. In an article written for DVD Journal, critic D.K. Holm noted numerous changes that altered the original considerably when the material was filmed. He cites as an example the hiring of Jack Lemmon. With his participation "little remained of the founding teleplay, except for actor Charles Bickford reprising his role."

=== Filming ===
The film's locations included San Francisco, Albany, California, and the Golden Gate Fields race track. The Oscar-winning title song had music by Henry Mancini and lyrics by Johnny Mercer. Single records by Andy Williams and the Henry Mancini chorus made the Billboard Top 40.

Director Blake Edwards became a non-drinker a year after completing the film and went into substance-abuse recovery. He said that he and Jack Lemmon were heavy drinkers while making the film. Edwards used the theme of alcohol abuse often in his films, including 10 (1979), Blind Date (1987) and Skin Deep (1989). Both Lemmon and Remick sought help from Alcoholics Anonymous long after they had completed the film. Lemmon revealed to James Lipton on Inside the Actors Studio his past drinking problems and his recovery. The film had a lasting effect in reinforcing the growing social acceptance of Alcoholics Anonymous.

In the interview on Inside the Actors Studio, Lemmon stated that there was pressure by the studio to change the ending. To preserve the integrity of the movie, scenes were filmed in the same order as they appeared in the script, with the last scene filmed last. This is in contrast with the standard practice of filming different scenes together that take place in the same location, which reduces expenses, shortens the schedule, and aids with scheduling the actors' time on set. Immediately following the completion of filming, Lemmon left for Europe and remained out of communication so that the studio would be forced to release the movie without changing the story.

== Release ==
The producers used the following tagline to market the film: "This, in its own terrifying way, is a love story."

The picture opened in the United States on December 26, 1962.

=== Home media ===
Warner Home Video released the film on video on February 9, 1983, as part of their "A Night At the Movies" series, featuring a Hearst Metrotone Newsreel; the Warner Bros. animated short Martian Through Georgia; and a trailer of films from 1962. A LaserDisc was released in 1990. A DVD of the film was released on January 6, 2004, by Warner Home Video containing an extra commentary track by director Blake Edwards and an interview with Jack Lemmon. A Warner Archive Blu-ray was released on October 29, 2019.

== Reception ==
=== Critical response ===
The film became one of Blake Edwards' better-regarded films, opening to praise from the critics and audiences alike. Bosley Crowther, film critic for The New York Times, wrote "[It] is a commanding picture, and it is extremely well played by Mr. Lemmon and Miss Remick, who spare themselves none of the shameful, painful scenes. But for all their brilliant performing and the taut direction of Blake Edwards, they do not bring two pitiful characters to complete and overpowering life."

Variety liked the film, especially the acting and writing: "Miller's gruelling drama illustrates how the unquenchable lure of alcohol can supersede even love, and how marital communication cannot exist in a house divided by one-sided boozing ... Lemmon gives a dynamic and chilling performance. Scenes of his collapse, particularly in the violent ward, are brutally realistic and terrifying. Miss Remick, too, is effective, and there is solid featured work from Charles Bickford and Jack Klugman and a number of fine supporting performances."

In a review of the DVD, critic Gary W. Tooze lauded Edwards' direction: "Blake Edwards's powerful adaptation of J.P. Miller's Playhouse 90 story, starring Jack Lemmon and Lee Remick in career performances, remains a variation in his body of work largely devoted to comedy... Lemmon is at his best and ditto for Remick in this harrowing tale of people consumed by their mutual addiction. This turns to an honest and heartbreaking portrayal of alcoholism as deftly done as any film I can remember."

Margaret Parsons, film curator at the National Gallery of Art, stated "[The film] remains one of the most gut-wrenching dramas of alcohol-related ruin and recovery ever captured on film...and it's also one of the pioneering films of the genre."

On review aggregator Rotten Tomatoes, Days of Wine and Roses has an very rare approval rating of 100% based on 15 reviews, with an average score of 8.80/10.

=== Box office ===
Jack L. Warner claimed the film needed to earn theatrical rentals of 2.5 times its $2 million budget to become profitable. It earned $4 million in rentals in the United States and Canada, from a gross of $8.1 million, ranking it 14th among high-grossing films of the year.

=== Awards and nominations ===
Award	Category	Nominee(s)	Result	Ref.
Academy Awards	Best Actor	Jack Lemmon	Nominated	
Academy Awards	Best Actress	Lee Remick	Nominated	
Academy Awards	Best Art Direction – Black-and-White	Art Direction: Joseph C. Wright; Set Decoration: George James Hopkins	Nominated	
Academy Awards	Best Costume Design – Black-and-White	Don Feld	Nominated	
Academy Awards	Best Song	"Days of Wine and Roses"; Music by Henry Mancini; Lyrics by Johnny Mercer	Won	
British Academy Film Awards	Best Film from any Source		Nominated	
British Academy Film Awards	Best Foreign Actor	Jack Lemmon	Nominated	
British Academy Film Awards	Best Foreign Actress	Lee Remick	Nominated	
Fotogramas de Plata	Best Foreign Performer	Jack Lemmon	Won	
Golden Globe Awards	Best Motion Picture – Drama		Nominated	
Golden Globe Awards	Best Actor in a Motion Picture – Drama	Jack Lemmon	Nominated	
Golden Globe Awards	Best Actress in a Motion Picture – Drama	Lee Remick	Nominated	
Golden Globe Awards	Best Director – Motion Picture	Blake Edwards	Nominated	
Grammy Awards	Album of the Year (Other Than Classical)	Days of Wine and Roses and Other TV Requests – Andy Williams	Nominated	
Grammy Awards	Record of the Year	"Days of Wine and Roses" – Henry Mancini	Won	
Grammy Awards	Song of the Year	"Days of Wine and Roses" – Henry Mancini and Johnny Mercer	Won	
Grammy Awards	Best Vocal Performance, Male	"Days of Wine and Roses" – Andy Williams	Nominated	
Grammy Awards	Best Background Arrangement (Behind Vocalist or Instrumentalist)	"Days of Wine and Roses" – Henry Mancini	Won	
Laurel Awards	Top Drama		Won	
Laurel Awards	Top Male Dramatic Performance	Jack Lemmon	Won	
Laurel Awards	Top Female Dramatic Performance	Lee Remick	Won	
Laurel Awards	Top Male Supporting Performance	Charles Bickford	Nominated	
Laurel Awards	Top Song	"Days of Wine and Roses"; Music by Henry Mancini; Lyrics by Johnny Mercer	Nominated	
National Film Preservation Board	National Film Registry		Inducted	
San Sebastián International Film Festival	OCIC Award	Blake Edwards	Won (Note: Tied with Kōzaburō Yoshimura for A Night to Remember.)	
San Sebastián International Film Festival	Best Actor	Jack Lemmon	Won	
San Sebastián International Film Festival	Best Actress	Lee Remick	Won	
Sant Jordi Awards	Best Performance in a Foreign Film	Jack Lemmon	Won	

Other Honors

- Selected by the film critics of The New York Times as one of the 1000 best films ever made.
- Selected as one of American Film Institute's best 400 films.

== Musical adaptation ==
The musical adaptation based on the film and the original teleplay was produced by the Atlantic Theater Company in 2023, starring Kelli O'Hara as Kirsten and Brian d'Arcy James as Joe. The musical has a book by Craig Lucas and music and lyrics by Adam Guettel, the same writing team behind The Light in the Piazza, and is directed by Michael Greif. It opened May 5, 2023, and closed on July 5 of the same year. The musical transferred to Broadway and opened on January 28, 2024, at Studio 54 and closed on March 31, 2024.

== In popular culture ==
Bill Withers was inspired by Days of Wine and Roses. Withers was watching it on television, and the doomed relationship at the film's center brought to mind a phrase: "Ain’t no sunshine when she’s gone." This led him to write "Ain't No Sunshine" in 1971.

The 15th episode of season 9 of the American television show Cheers is titled "Days of Wine and Neuroses" and features the character Rebecca Howe (Kirstie Alley) going through a tragicomic alcoholic binge while assessing her ambiguous feelings about a romantic relationship.

A sixth-season episode titled "Wine and Roses" from the American crime drama series Better Call Saul is named after Days of Wine and Roses and features an instrumental version of the movie's title song.

== See also ==
- List of American films of 1962
