= The Winslow Boy (disambiguation) =

The Winslow Boy is a 1946 British play by Terence Rattigan.

The Winslow Boy may also refer to:

- The Winslow Boy (1948 film), a 1948 British film based on the play, directed by Anthony Asquith
- The Winslow Boy (DuPont Show of the Month), a 1958 American television play
- The Winslow Boy (1999 film), a 1999 American film based on the play, adapted and directed by David Mamet
