= The Plot to Kill Stalin =

- Playhouse 90 episode
- Melvyn Douglas as Joseph Stalin in "The Plot to Kill Stalin"
- Episode no.: Season 3 Episode 1
- Directed by: Delbert Mann
- Written by: David Karp
- Original air date: September 25, 1958
- Running time: 79:42

Guest appearances
- Melvyn Douglas as Joseph Stalin; Oskar Homolka as Nikita Khrushchev; E. G. Marshall as Lavrentiy Beria; Eli Wallach as Alexander Poskrebyshev

Episode chronology
| ← Previous "A Bitter Heritage" | Next → "Days of Wine and Roses" |

"The Plot to Kill Stalin" was an American television play broadcast on September 25, 1958, on the CBS television network. It was the first episode of the third season of the anthology television series Playhouse 90. Delbert Mann was the director, and the cast included Melvyn Douglas as Joseph Stalin, Eli Wallach as Stalin's personal secretary, and Oskar Homolka as Nikita Khrushchev. It was nominated for two Sylvania Television Awards: as the outstanding telecast of 1958 and for Douglas as outstanding actor in a television program.

The production, set during the final months of Stalin's life, received generally positive reviews in the American press, but the Soviet Union protested the depiction of Krushchev's alleged role in Stalin's death and retaliated by closing CBS's Moscow news bureau and ordering its Moscow correspondent to leave the country.

== Plot ==
The play opens in Stalin's office on October 4, 1952, on the eve of the 19th Congress of the Communist Party of the Soviet Union. After a visit from his principal deputies, Stalin reveals to his personal aide, Alexander Poskrebyshev, his belief that there is a plot against him. In order to derail the plot, Stalin plans to dissolve the Politburo and replace it with a new Presidium.

After Stalin announces the dissolution of the Politburo, the Party's top leaders attend a reception and discuss Stalin's decision. Driving home that evening, Vyacheslav Molotov is urged by his wife to go into hiding. Mrs. Molotov suspects Stalin's intentions, but Molotov declares his continuing loyalty to Stalin.

Back in Stalin's office, Stalin informs Semyon Ignatyev, the Minister of State Security, that a doctors' plot led by Jews is underway to assassinate high-ranking officers in the Red Army. Stalin urges Ignatyev to uncover the plot. On leaving Stalin's office, Ignatyev informs his associate that there is no doctors' plot and that Stalin is instead seeking a reason to purge Lavrentiy Beria. When the play resumes, Ignatyev presents his evidence that Beria is covering up the doctors' plot. Beria learns that he is under investigation and interrogates a prisoner at Lubianka Prison, seeking to learn what information has been furnished to Stalin.

On February 9, 1953, after a wave of arrests, Beria tells Molotov that Stalin intends to liquidate all of the members of the former Politburo. Beria proposes that Stalin instead be liquidated and that Malenkov take Stalin's position. Malenkov agrees to the plan.

Sergei Shtemenko, Chief of Staff of the Soviet armed forces, is informed of the plot against Stalin and vows to assist Stalin in crushing the plot. When Shtemenko informs the other members of the Soviet general staff, Marshall Vasily Sokolovsky reminds Shtemenko of Stalin's purges against the Red Army and insists that the military must remain neutral and not interfere.

Stalin continues to receive reports on the plot and predicts infighting over who will succeed him. The production then cuts to Beria and Nikita Khrushchev plotting with each other to become joint leaders instead of letting Malenkov take over.

On March 1, 1953, Stalin invites Malenkov, Krushchev, Molotov and Beria to a meeting. Stalin says that he wishes to discuss his succession. After toying with the men, Stalin angrily confronts them with his knowledge of their plot. In the midst of the exchange, Stalin collapses on the floor from a stroke. Poskrebyshev enters to render assistance, but Krushchev refuses to allow any aid to be given to Stalin and throws his support to Malenkov as Stalin's successor.

After leaving Stalin on the floor overnight, Malenkov escorts a doctor to see Stalin. Malenkov assures the doctor that, if Stalin dies, it is understood that Stalin was an old man and that no harm will befall the doctor. The doctor realizes that Malenkov and the others do not want Stalin to live and that his own life is in danger. Stalin finally dies, and as the plotters gather to view Stalin's body, Beria's troops surround the city, and the plotters plot against each other.

== Cast ==
Cliff Robertson hosted the broadcast, in which the following actors received screen credit for their performances.

- Melvyn Douglas as Joseph Stalin
- Eli Wallach as Alexander Poskrebyshev
- Oskar Homolka as Nikita Khrushchev
- E. G. Marshall as Lavrentiy Beria
- Luther Adler as Vyacheslav Molotov
- Thomas Gomez as Georgy Malenkov
- Marian Seldes as Mrs. Molotov
- Lawrence Dobkin as Sergei Shtemenko
- Bert Freed as Vasily Sokolovsky
- David J. Stewart as Semyon Ignatyev
- Paul Bryar as Georgy Zhukov
- Paul Lambert as Rassine
- Harry Davision as Ryumin
- Paul Maxwell as Recorder
- Edwin Jerome as Senior Physician

== Production ==
In July 1958, CBS announced that it would open the new season of Playhouse 90 with a play about the final five months of Stalin's life. Fred Coe was selected as the producer and Delbert Mann as the director.

David Karp was hired to write the teleplay. In researching the subject, Karp conferred with experts, including a former Soviet leader. He was also assisted by The New York Times former Moscow correspondent, Harrison Salisbury, who was credited as a technical advisor.

In August, CBS announced the principal casting decisions, including Melvyn Douglas as Joseph Stalin, Eli Wallach as Stalin's personal secretary, E.G. Marshall as Lavrenti Beria, and Oscar Homolka as Nikita Khrushchev.

The play was broadcast at 9:30 p.m. on September 25, 1958, as part of the CBS television series Playhouse 90. The art director was Robert Tyler Lee.

== Reception ==
=== Critical reception ===
The teleplay was nominated for two Sylvania Television Awards: as the outstanding telecast of 1958 and for Douglas as outstanding actor in a television program. It also received generally positive reviews from critics.

In his review of the play, Jack Gould of The New York Times praised the performances of Homolka and Douglas as Krushchev and Stalin, but criticized the absence of character development. Gould also questioned the wisdom of depicting Krushchev as "virtually a murderer" and accused the program of "pursuing sensationalism."

UPI television critic William Ewald credited makeup man Bud Sweeney for his "superb job" and praised the overall production as "a gripper", "90 minutes packed with urgency."

Associated Press critic Charles Mercer called it fascinating and opined: "Seldom has TV drama presented such a gallery of vivid characterization by an outstanding cast."

Harry Harris of The Philadelphia Inquirer called it "engrossing" and "a rouser" and praised both the effective acting performances and the skillful direction of Delbert Mann.

Cecil Smith of the Los Angeles Times called it "superb."

Larry Wolters of the Chicago Tribune called it "a taut, suspenseful drama, superbly played".

=== Soviet response ===
Soviet Premier Nikita Khrushchev reportedly "hit the ceiling" when he learned of his depiction in the American television play. In response, the Soviet Union's Ambassador to the United States, Mikhail A. Menshikov, filed a formal protest with the United States Department of State. Menshikov called the production "filthy slander" and stated that the Soviet Union expected the American government "to prevent such anti-Soviet acts."

When the State Department responded that CBS was a private corporation which was not controlled by the government, the Soviet Union retaliated directly against CBS, ordering the network to close its Moscow news bureau, withdrawing its accreditation of the network's Moscow correspondent, Paul Niven, and telling Niven to leave the country and close the bureau within two weeks. CBS News issued a statement complaining about "severe censorship" of coverage from the Soviet Union.

Following the Soviet response, Jack Gould of The New York Times opined that, in depicting the current Soviet leader "for practical purposes" as Stalin's murderer, CBS made a "stupid mistake" and exercised "poor judgment".

CBS was not permitted to reopen a Moscow bureau until 1960.

== See also ==
- Death and state funeral of Joseph Stalin
- The Death of Stalin
