= Escape to Nowhere =

Escape to Nowhere may refer to:

- Escape to Nowhere (album), a 1988 album by Omen
- Escape to Nowhere (1973 film), a film by Claude Pinoteau
- Spectre (1996 film), a film by Scott Levy also known as Escape to Nowhere
- One (David Karp novel), a 1953 novel also known as Escape to Nowhere
