= No Time at All =

No Time at All may refer to:

- No Time at All (Playhouse 90), American film broadcast as February 13, 1958 episode of Playhouse 90
- "No Time at All", song by American composer Stephen Schwartz for 1972's Pippin (musical)#Songs
