= Little Moon of Alban =

Little Moon of Alban may refer to:

- Little Moon of Alban (Hallmark Hall of Fame), a 1958 American television play
- Little Moon of Alban (1964 film), an American television play
