= All the King's Men (Kraft Television Theatre) =

- Kraft Television Theatre episodes
- Episode nos.: Season 11; Episodes 31/32
- Directed by: Sidney Lumet
- Written by: Don Mankiewicz (teleplay), Robert Penn Warren (novel)
- Original air dates: May 14, 1958; May 21, 1958

Guest appearances
- Neville Brand as Willie Stark; Maureen Stapleton as Sadie Burke

Episode chronology
← Previous "The Outcasts of Poker Flat"	Next → "A Boy Called Ciske"

"All the King's Men" was an American television play broadcast in two parts by NBC on May 14 and 21, 1958, as part of the television series, Kraft Television Theatre. It was written by Don Mankiewicz based on the 1946 novel by Robert Penn Warren. Sidney Lumet was the director, and the cast was led by Neville Brand as Willie Stark and Maureen Stapleton as Sadie Burke.

== Plot ==
Based on Robert Penn Warren's 1946 novel, the production depicts the political rise of Willie Stark as he becomes governor and runs for the U.S. Senate.

== Cast ==
The cast included performances by:

- Neville Brand as Willie Stark
- Maureen Stapleton as Sadie Burke
- Fred J. Scollay as Jack Burden
- Nancy Marchand as Ann
- Richard Kiley
- Frank Conroy as The Judge
- Robert Emhardt
- William Prince
- Tim Hovey

== Reception ==
Maureen Stapleton was nominated for an Emmy Award for best single performance by an actress.

Stapleton and Neville Brand won the outstanding performance awards by an actress and actor at the 1958 Sylvania Television Awards. The production was also nominated as the outstanding telecast of 1958, losing out to Little Moon of Alban.
