= Aladdin (DuPont Show of the Month) =

- DuPont Show of the Month episode
- Episode no.: Season 1 Episode 6
- Directed by: Ralph Nelson
- Written by: S.J. Perelman
- Based on: Aladdin
- Original air date: February 21, 1958
- Running time: 90 minutes

Guest appearances
- Sal Mineo; Geoffrey Holder; Anna Maria Alberghetti; Basil Rathbone; Cyril Ritchard

Episode chronology
← Previous "The Bridge of San Luis Rey"	Next → "A Tale of Two Cities"

Aladdin is a 1958 American musical fantasy television film, with a book by S.J. Perelman and music and lyrics by Cole Porter, telecast in color on the DuPont Show of the Month by CBS. It was Porter's last musical score. Columbia Records issued both monophonic and stereophonic recordings of the original TV cast: Cyril Ritchard, Dennis King, Basil Rathbone, Anna Maria Alberghetti, Geoffrey Holder (as the Genie), Sal Mineo (as Aladdin), and Una Merkel (as Aladdin's mother).

The musical was adapted for the stage premiering December 17, 1959, at the London Coliseum, starring Bob Monkhouse, Doretta Morrow, Ian Wallace, and Ronald Shiner, under the musical direction of Bobby Howell. The London stage production expanded the score with several songs Cole Porter had originally penned for other productions.

== Musical numbers ==
Sony Records digitally remastered the original stereo recording for CD release; musical numbers included:

- "Come to the Supermarket (in Old Peking)"
- "Make Way (for the Emperor)"
- "Trust Your Destiny To Your Star"
- "Opportunity Knocks but Once (at Thuh Door)"
- "Aladdin"
- "Wouldn't It Be Fun"
- "I Adore You"
- "No Wonder Taxes Are High"
- "I Adore You (Reprise)"

The London stage production also included:

- "There Must Be Someone For Me" (from Mexican Hayride)
- "Cherry Pies Ought to Be You" (from Out of This World)
- "I Am Loved" (from Out of This World)
- "Ridin' High" (from Red, Hot and Blue!)

== Footage ==
The original telecast was never repeated (despite videotape being in use at the time), nor was it released on VHS or DVD. A kinescope of the 1958 broadcast survives at both the New York City and Beverly Hills branches of the Paley Center for Media.

== Reception ==
Charles Mercer said Aladdin was "an electronic wonder of sound, color, action and scene," but panned the writing and acting. Ray Oviatt praised the episode, particularly Cyril Ritchard and the soundtrack. William Ewald panned the special, calling it a "stunning disappointment." However, he conceded the opening song was a "mildly engaging number." John Crosby said the special had a "disparity of purpose" and criticized the casting of Italian Sal Mineo as a Chinese character.

== Influence ==
Barbra Streisand recorded the list song "Come to the Supermarket (in Old Peking)" for The Barbra Streisand Album in 1963. The same song was recorded by John Inman for Are You Being Served Sir? in 1975. Patti LuPone recorded the same song for her 1993 Live album.

== Lost Musicals revival ==
In 2012, as part of his Lost Musicals project, Ian Marshall-Fisher directed a stage revival at Sadler's Wells, London. The cast included John Savident as The Magician, Richard Dempsey as Aladdin, Vivienne Martin as Aladdin's mother, Candy Ma as the Princess and Rhiannon Drake as Jade Bud. The production garnered much media attention, due to the well-known cast.
