= David Karp (novelist) =

American writer

David Karp (May 5, 1922 – September 11, 1999) was an American novelist and television writer. He also used the pseudonyms Wallace Ware and Adam Singer.

== Life and career ==
Born in Manhattan, Karp worked for his living from an early age. His employment included selling shirts from an outdoor stand, theatre-ushering, leading a recreation group, and dish-washing. In 1942, he enlisted in the United States Army and served in the Signal Corps in the Philippines and in Japan.

Karp left the Army in 1946 and continued his interrupted education, graduating from the City College of New York in 1948. He started his media career as a continuity writer for a New York radio station and published his first novel in 1952. When writing for television he often tackled controversial topics.

Karp was married to Lillian Klass Karp from 1944 until her death in 1987, after which he married Claire Leighton Karp. He had two sons, Ethan Ross Karp and Andrew Gabriel Karp, both of Los Angeles. He died of emphysema in Pittsfield, Massachusetts.

== Novels ==
- The Big Feeling (1952)
- The Brotherhood of Velvet (1952)
- One (1953) (a.k.a. Escape to Nowhere)
- Hardman (1953)
- Cry Flesh (1953) (a.k.a. The Girl on Crown Street)
- Platoon (1953) (as Adam Singer)
- The Day of the Monkey (1955)
- All Honorable Men (1956)
- Leave Me Alone (1957)
- Enter Sleeping (1960) (a.k.a. Sleepwalkers)
- The Last Believers (1964)

== Biography ==
- Vice President in Charge of Revolution (1960) (with Murray D. Lincoln)

== Television work ==
- The Untouchables (various episodes)
- The Defenders (various episodes)
- The Brotherhood of the Bell (1970 television film)
- Hawkins (1973–1974 television series), creator and writer
- The Plot to Kill Stalin (1958 television play)
