= The Last Clear Chance =

- Playhouse 90 episode
- Paul Muni in "The Last Clear Chance"
- Episode no.: Season 2 Episode 26
- Directed by: George Roy Hill
- Written by: A. E. Hotchner
- Original air date: March 6, 1958
- Running time: 90 minutes

Guest appearances
- Paul Muni as Sam Arlen; Luther Adler as D.A. Forrest Garvin; Dick York as Scott Arlen

Episode chronology
← Previous "Portrait of a Murderer"	Next → "The Male Animal"

"The Last Clear Chance" was an American television film broadcast on March 6, 1958, as part of the CBS television series, Playhouse 90. A courtroom drama, it features a strong performance by Paul Muni as an attorney defending his son in disbarment proceedings. Muni was nominated for both an Emmy Award and a Sylvania Award for his performance.

== Plot ==
An attorney, Scott Arlen, represents a girl, Peggy Maylin, accused of murder trial. She gives him a gun, and he decides not to turn it over to the court or the prosecutor. After winning the girl's acquittal, Arlen turns over the gun and faces disbarment. Sam Arlen is an aging lawyer who comes out of retirement to defend his son in the disbarment proceeding.

== Cast ==
- Paul Muni as Sam Arlen
- Luther Adler as D.A. Forrest Garvin
- Dick York as Scott Arlen
- Lee Remick as Peggy Maylin
- Eithne Dunne as Mrs. Matson
- John Hoyt as Ross Melnichor
- Carl Benton Reid as Judge

== Production ==
George Roy Hill was the director. The script was written by A. E. Hotchner.

Paul Muni received nominations as best actor at both the 11th Primetime Emmy Awards and the 1958 Sylvania Television Awards.

== Reception ==
In The New York Times, Jack Gould praised Paul Muni's for a "commanding" and "extremely powerful" performance. However, he found the production to be "rambling and disorganized."

United Press television critic William Ewald was effusive in his praise for Muni's performance, calling it intelligent, authoritative, excessive but "all very right", a "calisthenic grab bag," and "a performance with salt and bite that dripped with brine."
