= Little Moon of Alban (Hallmark Hall of Fame) =

- Hallmark Hall of Fame episode
- Julie Harris, Barry Jones & Christopher Plummer in Little Moon of Alban
- Episode no.: Season 7 Episode 5
- Directed by: George Schaefer
- Written by: James Costigan
- Original air date: March 24, 1958
- Running time: 1:29

Guest appearances
- Julie Harris as Brigid Mary Mangan; Christopher Plummer as Kenneth Boyd

Episode chronology
← Previous "Hans Brinker"	Next → "Dial M for Murder"

"Little Moon of Alban" was an American television play broadcast by NBC on March 24, 1958, as part of the television series, Hallmark Hall of Fame. It was written by James Costigan, directed by George Schaefer, and starred Julie Harris and Christopher Plummer.

The production won four Primetime Emmy Awards for best special dramatic program, best performance by an actress (Harris), best direction (Schaefer), and best writing (Costigan). It was also recognized with Peabody, Christopher, and Sylvania Television Awards.

== Plot ==
The play is set in Dublin and vicinity between October 1919 and January 1922. Brigid Mary Mangan (played by Julie Harris) has already lost her brother and father to the Irish War of Independence. Her fiancé Dennis (played by George Peppard) also becomes involved in the rebellion and is killed by English soldiers as she watches. Brigid Mary then joins the Daughters of Charity and is assigned to a hospital. She meets a wounded English lieutenant, Kenneth Boyd (played by Christopher Plummer). Boyd is the English soldier who killed her fiancé. He was badly injured in a retaliatory attack by Irish rebels. Both Brigid Mary and Boyd have had their faith shaken. Brigid Mary nurses Boyd back to health, and he asks her to marry him. Having regained her faith, she decides instead to renew her vows.

== Cast ==
The cast included performances by:

- Julie Harris as Brigid Mary Mangan
- Christopher Plummer as Kenneth Boyd
- Frank Conroy as Father Curran
- George Peppard as Dennis Walsh
- Nora O'Mahoney as Shelagh Mangan (credited as Nora O'Mahony)
- Elspeth March as Sister Savant
- Barry Jones as Dr. Clive
- Helena Carroll as Sister Teresa
- Pauline Flanagan as Sister Martha Kevin
- Mildred Trares as Sister Barbara
- Norman Barrs as English Officer
- Joseph Maher as British Soldier
- Jamie Ross as British Soldier
- Liam Clancy as Boy
- Tom Clancy as Patch Keegan

== Production ==
George Schaefer was the producer and director and James Costigan the writer. It was broadcast in color on the NBC network on March 24, 1958, as part of the series, Hallmark Hall of Fame. Presented as an Easter special, it was the first 90-minute original teleplay commissioned by the Hallmark Hall of Fame. It was a key early role for George Peppard.

=== Adaptations ===
In 1960, Costigan adapted the work for Broadway with Harris reprising her role and John Justin playing part of the English officer and Robert Redford playing the part of her fiance.

The program was restaged in March 1964 with Harris reprising her role and Dirk Bogarde in the role of the English officer. Ruth White played Shelagh Mangan in the 1964 version and won an Emmy award for outstanding performance in a supporting role by an actress.

== Reception ==
=== Critics ===
In The New York Times, Jack Gould called it a play of "stirring poignancy and beauty" and "a searching and sensitive study of the turmoil of a human soul." He praised Harris's performance as a "glowing" and "utterly compelling" depiction of sincere faith and inner struggle.

Charles Mercer of the Associated Press called it "technically faultless" and praised the superb acting and production. He did, however, find that the story "failed to transcend sectarianism" and failed to convince him that Bridgid Mary's life with the Sisters of Charity would be more satisfying than it might have been as the wife of the English lieutenant.

William Ewald of the United Press praised Costigan's "crisp and prickly dialogue" and was especially effusive in his praise for Julie Harris's performance: "She has that ability rare among TV actresses -- and almost non-existent among movie queens -- to pitch out an emotion without excessive gesture, she does not merely underplay, she does something much finer -- she works from inside herself, squeezing out scenes through her pores."

Cecil Smith of the Los Angeles Times called it "an excellent piece of work, beautifully staged".

=== Awards ===
In January 1959, the production was honored in four categories at the 1958 Sylvania Television Awards: for outstanding telecast of the year; for outstanding dramatic program of the year; for outstanding performance by an actress (Julie Harris); and for best original teleplay (James Costigan).

In May 1959, the production also won four Primetime Emmy Awards: for best special dramatic program; for best single performance by an actress (Julie Harris); for best direction of a single dramatic program, one hour or longer (George Schaefer); and for best writing of a single dramatic program, one hour or longer (James Costigan). It also received nominations in two other categories: for most outstanding single program of the year and for best single performance by an actor (Christopher Plummer).

Costigan and NBC also won the 1958 Peabody Award for television writing "for the lyric beauty, the poetic insight, and the dramatic integrity" of Little Moon of Alban.

In January 1959, Schaefer, Costigan, and executive producer Mildred Freed Alberg also received Christopher Awards for Little Moon of Alban.
