= Portrait of a Murderer (Playhouse 90) =

- Playhouse 90 episode
- Geraldine Page and Tab Hunter in "Portrait of a Murderer"
- Episode no.: Season 2 Episode 25
- Directed by: Arthur Penn
- Written by: Leslie Stevens (adaptation), Abby Mann (story)
- Original air date: February 27, 1958
- Running time: 90 minutes

Guest appearances
- Tab Hunter as Donald Bashor; Geraldine Page as Florry

Episode chronology
← Previous "Point of No Return"	Next → "The Last Clear Chance"

Salt Lake Tribune 27 Feb 1958

"Portrait of a Murderer" was an American television play broadcast on February 27, 1958, as part of the second season of the CBS television series Playhouse 90. Leslie Stevens wrote the teleplay, as an adaptation of a story by Abby Mann. Arthur Penn directed, Martin Manulis produced, and Dominick Dunne was an assistant to the producer. Tab Hunter and Geraldine Page starred. Hunter received an Emmy nomination for his performance.

Tab Hunter played the killer Donald Bashor.

== Plot ==
A respected man, Donald Bashor, commits a robbery and is suspected of two recent murders.

== Cast ==
The following cast received screen credit for their performances.

- Tab Hunter as Donald Bashor
- Geraldine Page as Florry
- Rudy Bond as Eddie
- Elizabeth Patterson as Mrs. Finch
- Frank London as Jackie
- Ned Glass as Charlie
- Barbara Turner as Sandra
- Sid Clute as Mr. Cooney
- Richard Bisutti as Bobby
- Donald Foster as Psychiatrist
- Joe Perry as Records Officer
- Almira Sessions as Murdered Woman
- Edwin Jerome as Judge
- Jules Maitland as Interviewer
- Joe A. Mayo as Policeman
- Glenn Turnbull as Policeman
- Bill Boyett as Policeman
- Gary Walberg as Policemen

== Production ==
Leslie Stevens wrote the script with the assistance of a former cell mate of Bashor's; he also wrote while listening to interviews with Bashor and reading Bashor's letters.

Director Arthur Penn called Bashor "a perfect case of split personality and he knew it. He talked of his 'bad self' and his 'good self'. He wanted to die, he wanted to kill his 'bad self'."

The production used taped interviews with Bashor.

Penn reportedly said later when he read the script "I was wishing I hadn't signed as director. It was junk. The writer wasn't to blame. He couldn't really tell the story because of all the legal barriers."

== Reception ==
The Los Angeles Times thought "I'm not sure the play was quite up to its material" but felt noentheless it was "extremely interesting TV study and well worth your time."

Variety said it "was made bearable by the superb acting of Tab Hunter."

The AV Club says the director Arthur Penn "makes extensive use of Bashor's actual statements and a first-person camera to create a faux-documentary style that was decades ahead of its time. Penn marveled at the improvisatory aspect of Tab Hunter's performance as Bashor, citing an unplanned moment in which Hunter stops to pick up a basket of spilled laundry just after his character has committed murder. It was a textbook case of how the immediacy of live television was meant to work."

Penn said "I think it’s one of Tab’s best performances. There was a kind of improvisatory aspect to it. You live ‘in the moment’... it liberated him from this rather rigid pretty boy thing."

Ray Stark wanted to make a film version directed by Stevens with Hunter reprising his role, but it was never made.
