= Turn Left at Mount Everest =

- Playhouse 90 episode
- Episode no.: Season 2 Episode 29
- Written by: Del Reisman (adaptation), Lowell Barrington (stage play)
- Original air date: April 3, 1958

Guest appearances
- Peter Lorre as Tenzing; Fess Parker as Pvt. Linus Powell; Patricia Cutts as Sally Gates

Episode chronology
← Previous "The Right Hand Man"	Next → "The Dungeon"

"Turn Left at Mount Everest" was an American television play broadcast on April 3, 1958, as part of the second season of the CBS television series Playhouse 90. Del Reisman wrote the teleplay, as an adaptation of a stage play by Lowell Barrington. Peter Lorre and Fess Parker starred.

== Plot ==
A comedy in which Private Linus Powell stows away on a B-17 flying from China across the Himalayas at the end of World War II to reunite with his British girlfriend in Calcutta. While Powell sleeps, the crew bails out in a monsoon, and Powell is left behind with a half-loaded Asian man, Tenzing, who tries to guide Powell over the Himalayas.

== Cast ==
The following cast received screen credit for their performances.

- Peter Lorre as Tenzing
- Fess Parker as Pvt. Linus Powell
- Patricia Cutts as Sally Gates
- Paul Ford as Colonel
- Arnold Stang as Allencamp

== Reception ==
Television critic William Ewald described it as "a pretty peculiar stab" at light comedy. While he found some scenes that "almost made it", he concluded that the production "as a whole ... didn't have it. Its situation and characters were only mildly amusing and its dialogue lacked sustained spark."

Critic Hope Strong wrote that the production aspired to be "deliciously droll" but ended up with "drizzly drivel."

Another critic, Fred Remington, was amused by the production, writing that Fess Parker "just plays himself, and a very agreeable, entertaining self it is."
