= The Male Animal (Playhouse 90) =

- Playhouse 90 episode
- Episode no.: Season 2 Episode 27
- Written by: Helene Hanff (adaptation), James Thurber and Elliott Nugent (play)
- Original air date: March 13, 1958

Guest appearances
- Andy Griffith as Prof. Tommy Turner; Ann Rutherford as Ellen Turner; Edmond O'Brien as Joe Ferguson; Gale Gordon as Ed Keller

Episode chronology
← Previous "The Last Clear Chance"	Next → "The Right Hand Man"

"The Male Animal" was an American television play broadcast on March 13, 1958, as part of the second season of the CBS television series Playhouse 90. Helene Hanff wrote the teleplay, as an adaptation of the play by James Thurber and Elliott Nugent. Andy Griffith, Gale Gordon, Ann Rutherford, and Edmond O'Brien starred.

== Plot ==
An English professor challenges the school's trustees over issues of academic freedom as his wife's old boyfriend returns to campus for a sporting event.

== Cast ==
The following cast received screen credit for their performances.

- Andy Griffith as Prof. Tommy Turner
- Ann Rutherford as Ellen Turner
- Edmond O'Brien as Joe Ferguson
- Charles Ruggles as Dean Damon
- Gale Gordon as Ed Keller
- Dick Sargent as Michael
- Ronnie Knox
