= Old Man (Playhouse 90) =

- Playhouse 90 episode
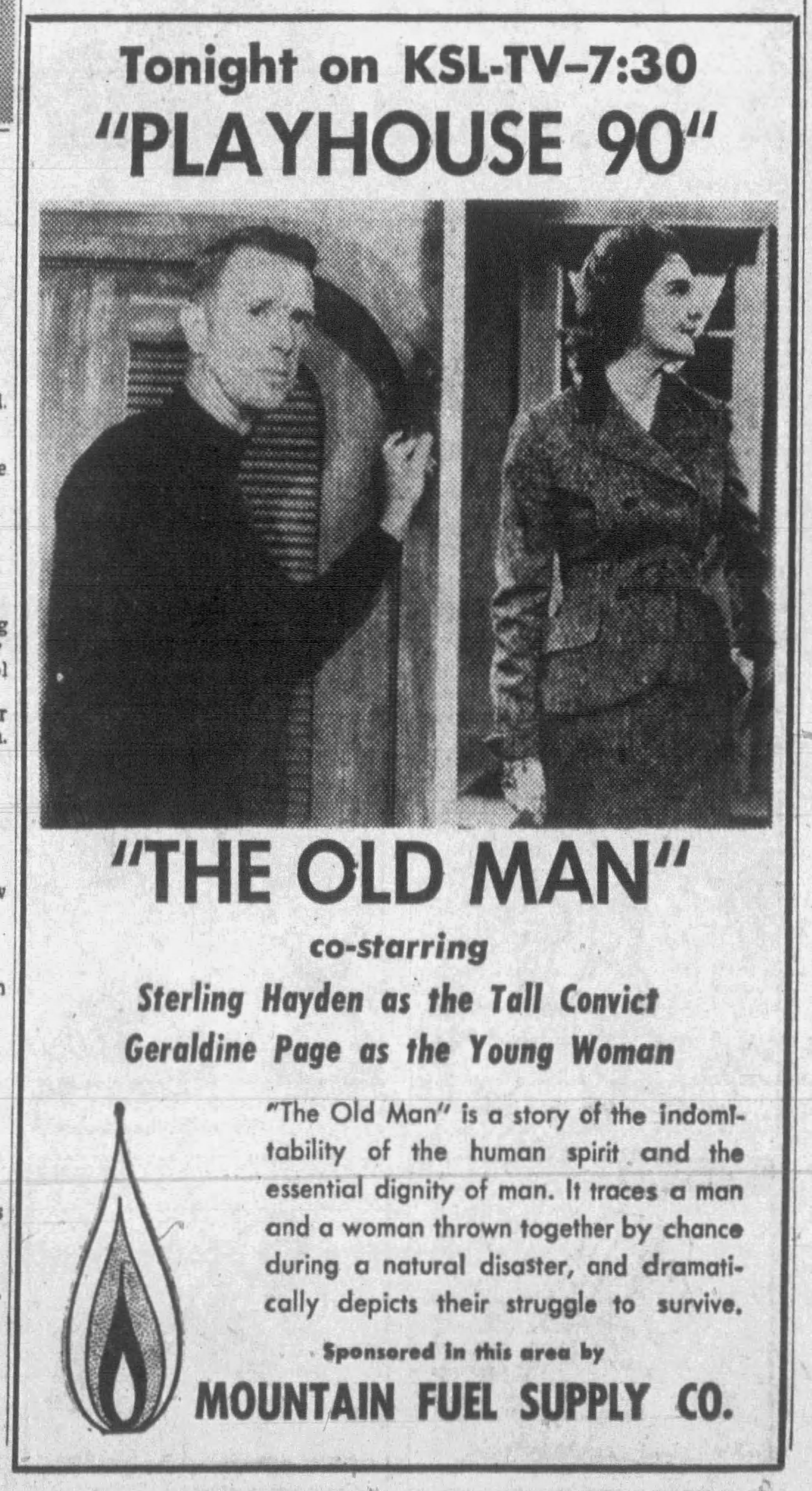
- Advertisement for "Old Man"
- Episode no.: Season 3 Episode 8
- Directed by: John Frankenheimer
- Written by: Horton Foote (adaptation), William Faulkner (novel)
- Original air date: November 20, 1958

Guest appearances
- Sterling Hayden as Tall convict; Geraldine Page as Young woman

Episode chronology
← Previous "Heart of Darkness"	Next → "The Return of Ansel Gibbs"

"Old Man" is an American television play broadcast on November 20, 1958, as part of the CBS television series, Playhouse 90. The production, starring Sterling Hayden and Geraldine Page, was adapted by Horton Foote from the short novel "Old Man" by William Faulkner. It was nominated for three Emmy Awards: for most outstanding program of the year; for best single performance by an actress (Page); and for best writing of a single dramatic program one hour or longer (Foote).

== Plot ==
A prison farm in Mississippi releases prisoners to help fight a flood. The story focuses on the interaction between a tall convict, a pregnant young woman, and the floodwaters. The "Old Man" referenced in the title is the Mississippi River.

== Cast ==
Melvyn Douglas hosted the broadcast, in which the following cast received screen credit for their performances.

- Sterling Hayden as tall convict
- Geraldine Page as young woman
- Milton Selzer as long-term prisoner
- Malcolm Atterbury as sympathetic physician
- James Westerfield as warden

== Production ==
John Frankenheimer was the director and Fred Coe the producer. Horton Foote wrote the teleplay based on William Faulkner's short novel "Old Man" published in 1938 as part of the book The Wild Palms.

== Reception ==
In The New York Times, John P. Shanley called it a "superlative production" and praised Geraldine Page for "a performance of remarkable range and sensitivity."

Television critic William Ewald called it "superb" and credited the success to the John Frankenheimer, "one of TV's young geniuses," and Horton Foote. He also praised Page's performance as "brilliant" and called a scene in which Hayden rescued Page from the river in time for her to give birth to a baby as "one of the most moving scenes I've ever witness[ed] on TV."
