= A Bitter Heritage =

- Playhouse 90 episodes
- Franchot Tone and Eva LeGallienne in A Bitter Heritage
- Episode nos.: Season 2 Episodes 40
- Directed by: Paul Wendkos
- Written by: Joseph Landon
- Original air date: August 7, 1958

Guest appearances
- Elizabeth Montgomery as Mary Brecker; James Drury as Jesse James Jr.; Franchot Tone as Frank James

Episode chronology
← Previous "The Great Gatsby"	Next → "The Plot To Kill Stalin"

"A Bitter Heritage" was an American television film broadcast on April 17, 1958, and again on August 7, 1958 as part of the second season of the CBS television series Playhouse 90. Joseph Landon wrote the teleplay and Paul Wendkos directed. Elizabeth Montgomery, James Drury, and Franchot Tone.

== Plot ==
Following the death of Jesse James, his peace-loving, law-abiding son, Jesse Jr., and his uncle Frank return to the family's home town, hoping to live peaceably and raise horses. The daughter of a town leader, Mary Brecker, is attracted to Jesse Jr. They are ambushed by Tom Barnes, whose father was killed by Jesse Sr. They are also framed for a bank robbery and chased by a posse.

== Cast ==
The following cast received screen credit for their performances.

- Elizabeth Montgomery as Mary Brecker
- James Drury as Jesse James Jr.
- Franchot Tone as Frank James
- Robert Middleton as Luke Crocker
- Henry Hull as Old Henry
- Eva LaGalliene as Grandma James
- Dayton Lummis as Colonel Brecker
- Strother Martin as Earle Wheeler
- Denver Pyle as Sam Wheeler
- Russell Thorson as Sheriff Piets

== Production ==
The film was a Screen Gems production with Winston O'Keefe as the producer. Paul Wendkos directed, and Joseph Landon wrote the script. It was broadcast on Thursday, August 7, 1958, as part of the CBS television series Playhouse 90.

The production starred Elizabeth Montgomery as Mary Brecker, James Drury as Jesse Jr., and Franchot Tone as Frank James. Montgomery (later famous for her work on the television series Bewitched) auditioned for the role without the knowledge of her father, actor Robert Montgomery. Montgomery noted at the time, "Contrary to the old saw about 'knowing somebody', I've found that being the daughter of a famous father can be a hindrance sometimes, too."

Ethel Barrymore had signed to play Grandma James, but she broke her arm and was replaced by Eva LaGalliene.
