= The Dungeon (Playhouse 90) =

- Playhouse 90 episode
- Agnes Moorehead and Paul Douglas in "The Dungeon"
- Episode no.: Season 2 Episode 30
- Directed by: David Swift
- Written by: David Swift
- Original air date: April 17, 1958

Guest appearances
- Paul Douglas as Emery Ganun; Agnes Moorehead as Rose Ganun; Dennis Weaver as Karl Ohringer

Episode chronology
← Previous "Turn Left at Mount Everest"	Next → "Verdict of Three"

"The Dungeon" was an American television film broadcast on April 17, 1958, as part of the second season of the CBS television series Playhouse 90. David Swift wrote the teleplay and directed. Paul Douglas, Agnes Moorehead, and Dennis Weaver starred.

== Plot ==
Karl Ohringer is acquitted of murder on grounds that the killing was not intentional. A wealthy and eccentric man, Emery Ganun, decides to take justice into his own hands.

== Cast ==
The following cast received screen credit for their performances.

- Paul Douglas as Emery Ganun
- Agnes Moorehead as Rose Ganun
- Dennis Weaver as Karl Ohringer
- Julie Adams as Janice Ohringer
- Patty McCormack as Mahala May
- Thomas Gomez as John Marin
- Ian Wolfe as Eduard Wingate
- Patrick McVey as Lt. Galiffa
- Werner Klemperer as Jesse Eastland
- Russell Collins as Walter Hinch
- Eduard Franz as Burton Wheless
- Ken Lynch
- Johnny Crawford
- Mimi Gibson
- Robert Osterloh
- Philip Tonge
