= Point of No Return (Playhouse 90) =

- Playhouse 90 episodes
- Hope Lange and Charlton Heston in "Point of No Return"
- Episode nos.: Season 2 Episodes 24
- Directed by: Franklin Schaffner
- Written by: Frank D. Gilroy (adaptation), John P. Marquand (novel)
- Original air date: February 20, 1958
- Running time: 1:30

Guest appearances
- Charlton Heston as Charles Gray; Hope Lange as Jessica Lovell; Edward Andrews as Roger Blakesley; John Williams as Mr. Lovell

Episode chronology
← Previous "No Time at All"	Next → "Portrait of a Murderer"

"Point of No Return" was an American television play broadcast on February 20, 1958, as part of the second season of the CBS television series Playhouse 90. Franklin Schaffner directed. Charlton Heston and Hope Lange starred.

== Plot ==
Financier Charles Gray, under consideration for a promotion, is sent to his home town in New England, visits his childhood sweetheart, and questions his life and marriage.

== Cast ==
The following cast received screen credit for their performances.

- Charlton Heston as Charles Gray
- Hope Lange as Jessica Lovell
- Edward Andrews as Roger Blakesley
- John Williams as Mr. Lovell
- Nancy Gray as Katharine Bard
- Ainslie Pryor as Jackie Mason

== Production ==
Franklin Schaffner directed. Frank D. Gilroy wrote the teleplay as an adaptation of the novel by John P. Marquand. It was originally broadcast on February 20, 1958. It was part of the second season of Playhouse 90, an anthology television series that was voted "the greatest television series of all time" in a 1970 poll of television editors.
