= The Right Hand Man (Playhouse 90) =

- Playhouse 90 episode
- Anne Baxter and Dana Andrews in "The Right Hand Man"
- Episode no.: Season 2 Episode 28
- Directed by: Franklin Schaffner
- Written by: Dick Berg (adaptation), Garson Kanin (story)
- Original air date: February 28, 1958

Guest appearances
- Dana Andrews as Leo Bass; Anne Baxter as Pat Bass; Leslie Nielsen as Ralph Mohr

Episode chronology
← Previous "The Male Animal"	Next → "Turn Left at Mount Everest"

"The Right Hand Man" was an American television play broadcast live on March 20, 1958, as part of the second season of the CBS television series Playhouse 90. Dick Berg wrote the teleplay, as an adaptation of a story by Garson Kanin. Dana Andrews, Anne Baxter, and Leslie Nielsen starred. Franklin J. Schaffner directed. The program was the live dramatic television debut for both Andrews and Baxter.

== Plot ==
Pat Bass is the neglected wife of Leo Bass, the owner of a talent agency who has allowed business to dominate his life at the expense of his wife. Ralph Mohr is Bass's assistant, i.e., the "right hand man". A struggle for control of the agency ensues.

== Cast ==
The following cast received screen credit for their performances.

- Dana Andrews as Leo Bass
- Anne Baxter as Pat Bass
- Leslie Nielsen as Ralph Mohr
- Stuart Erwin as George Clay
- June Collyer as Trixie Clay
- Ruta Lee

== Reception ==
Television critic Jack O'Brian called it "well-written and extremely well acted," singling out Leslie Nielsen for special praise. O'Brian also praised the physical production as "rich, big and impressively tasteful" and called Schaffner's direction "sure and effective".
