= One (David Karp novel) =

1953 dystopian novel by David Karp

- Vanguard Press first edition
- Author: David Karp
- Language: English
- Genre: Utopian and dystopian fiction
- Publisher: Vanguard Press
- Publication date: 1953
- Publication place: United States
- Media type: Print (hardback & paperback)

One is a dystopian novel by David Karp first published in 1953. It was also published under the title, Escape to Nowhere.

Set in an unspecified time in the future in an unspecified Americanized country, One depicts a society on its way to a self-proclaimed perfection which consists in dissension having been rooted out and every citizen identifying his or her own interests with those of the "benevolent State". In order to achieve this aim, an enormous state apparatus has devised a sophisticated system of surveillance, subtle forms of re-education and, if necessary, brainwashing. The novel describes one such instance, where a man who believes himself to be an active supporter of the system is found guilty of "heresy" by the authorities and accordingly is held captive and receives the State's routine treatment for his allegedly deviant behaviour. The major part of One details the various stages and methods of his re-education process, while the book's focus lies not only on the reactions of the tortured but also on the thoughts and considerations of his torturers.

== Reception ==
Though praised widely, One was panned by Anthony Boucher, a political activist, and J. Francis McComas, a close friend and partner of Boucher, who faulted the book for its "long and tedious repetition of a tired topic, . . . which, for all its literary pretensions, neglects such literary essentials as consistency of background and motivation of characters."
