= No Time at All (Playhouse 90) =

- Playhouse 90 episode
- Television advertisement for "No Time At All"
- Episode no.: Season 2 Episode 23
- Directed by: David Swift
- Written by: David Swift and Charles Einstein
- Original air date: February 13, 1958
- Running time: 90 minutes

Guest appearances
- William Lundigan as Ben Gammon; Betsy Palmer as Emmy Verdon; Jane Greer as Karen; Keenan Wynn as Marshall Keats

Episode chronology
← Previous "The Violent Heart"	Next → "Point of No Return"

"No Time at All" is an American television film broadcast on February 13, 1958, as part of the CBS television series, Playhouse 90. It is the twenty-third episode of the second season of Playhouse 90.

The film was based on Charles Einstein's 1957 novel and directed by David Swift. It featured a large cast that included William Lundigan, Betsy Palmer, Keenan Wynn, Sylvia Sidney, Buster Keaton, Chico Marx, Jack Haley, and Charles Bronson.

== Plot ==
A stricken airliner disappears from radar on a flight from Miami to New York. The film follows the consequences for friends and relatives of the passengers.

== Cast ==
The following cast received screen credit for their performances.

- William Lundigan as Ben Gammon
- Betsy Palmer as Emmy Verdon
- Jane Greer as Karen
- Keenan Wynn as Marshall Keats
- Cliff Edwards as Webber's Manager
- Harry Einstein as Mr. Laurie
- Jay C. Flippen as Happy Gallant
- Reginald Gardiner as Felix Allardyce
- James Gleason as Dolph Grimes
- Jack Haley as Stanley Leeds
- Florence Halop as Mrs. Laurie
- Buster Keaton as Harrison
- Chico Marx as Mr. Kramer
- Sylvia Sidney as Mrs. Kramer
- Shepperd Strudwick as Reagan
- Regis Toomey as Joe Donaldson
- Frank Wilcox
- Ron Hargrave
- Sam Gilman
- Charles Bronson

== Production ==
Jaime del Valle was the producer, and David Swift directed. David Swift and Charles Einstein wrote the teleplay as an adaptation of Einstein's 1957 novel, No Time at All. The production was presented on videotape.

The film's star, William Lundigan, was previously the host of the CBS television series, Climax!. No Time at All was Lundigan's first dramatic role in four years.

== Reception ==
In The New York Times, Jack Gould referred to the large cast as "half of Hollywood in search of a play." He panned the story as "utterly pedestrian nonsense, wildly implausible in detail and patched together with bits and pieces of second-hand emotionalism."

Television critic Bill Fiset wrote that the story "was remarkably without any continuity, motivation, emotion or even common sense" and "fell with an awful thud." As for the overall production, Fiset opined that it "had all the merits of a Class D British movie."
