= The Winslow Boy (DuPont Show of the Month) =

- DuPont Show of the Month episode
- Episode no.: Season 2 Episode 3
- Directed by: Alex Segal
- Written by: Sumner Locke Elliott (TV adaptation), Terence Rattigan (underlying play)
- Original air date: November 13, 1958
- Running time: 1:25:36

Guest appearances
- Fredric March as Arthur Winslow; Florence Eldridge as Grace Winslow; Siobhan McKenna as Catherine Winslow

Episode chronology
← Previous "The Count of Monte Cristo"	Next → "The Hasty Heart"

"The Winslow Boy" was an American television play broadcast by CBS on November 13, 1958, as part of the television series, DuPont Show of the Month. It was based on the play by Terence Rattigan. Alex Segal was the director and David Susskind the producer. Fredric March starred as Arthur Winslow and was nominated for a Sylvania Award for his performance.

== Plot ==
The play was on the Archer-Shee Case, a famous case heard in 1910. A 14-year-old boy, Ronnie Winslow, is unjustly accused of stealing a five shilling postal order and expelled from the Royal Naval College, Osborne. His father, Arthur Winslow (played by Fredric March) hires a famous solicitor who successfully proves the boy's innocence and clears his name. (The real-life Winslow Boy was subsequently killed in World War I at age 19.)

== Cast ==
The cast included performances by:

- Fredric March as Arthur Winslow
- Florence Eldridge as Grace Winslow
- Rex Thompson as Ronnie Winslow
- Denholm Elliott as John Watherstone
- Peter Bathurst as Desmond Curry
- Siobhan McKenna as Catherine Winslow
- Noel Willman as Sir Robert Norton
- Norah Howard as Violet
- John Milligan as Dickie
- Guy Spall as Attorney General
- Jean Cameron as Postmistress
- Pat Nye as Miss Barnes

== Production ==
The production starred Fredric March and his real-life wife Florence Eldridge as the Winslow boy's parents. The program was an adaptation of the play by Terence Ratigan. David Susskind was the producer and Alex Segal the director.

For his performance as Arthur Winslow, March was nominated for outstanding actor at the 1958 Sylvania Television Awards.

== Reception ==
In The New York Times, Jack Gould gave the production a positive review.

Variety wrote "On all counts — acting, directing, adaptation, production — it was stunningly executed; the kind of devotion to a medium (and theatre) that pops up occasionally on a Playhouse 90 or a Hallmark Hall of Fame, but otherwise is pretty much lost to tv."
