= DuPont Show of the Month =

American anthology drama TV series

- Title card
- Genre: Anthology
- Directed by: Sidney Lumet; Ralph Nelson; Alex Segal; Robert Mulligan
- Country of origin: United States
- Original language: English
- No. of seasons: 4

Production
- Running time: 90 minutes
- Production company: Talent Associates

Original release
- Network: CBS
- Release: September 29, 1957 – March 20, 1961

Crescendo (1957); The premiere episode of DuPont Show of the Month

DuPont Show of the Month is a 90-minute television anthology series that aired monthly on CBS from 1957 to 1961. The DuPont Company also sponsored a weekly half-hour dramatic anthology series hosted by June Allyson, The DuPont Show with June Allyson (1959–61).

During the Golden Age of Television, DuPont Show of the Month was one of numerous anthology series telecast between 1949 and 1962. Superficially, it resembled Playhouse 90 and other anthologies, but DuPont Show of the Month focused less on contemporary dramas and more on adaptations of literary classics, including Oliver Twist, The Prince and the Pauper, Billy Budd, The Prisoner of Zenda, A Tale of Two Cities and The Count of Monte Cristo.

== Directors and writers ==
The directors for the series included Sidney Lumet, Ralph Nelson, Alex Segal and Robert Mulligan.

DuPont Show of the Month was the first anthology series to stage a television dramatization of Thornton Wilder's only novel, The Bridge of San Luis Rey. It also presented original dramas, such as The Lincoln Murder Case. Dale Wasserman wrote for the show, and it was Wasserman's I, Don Quixote on this series (November 9, 1959) that was eventually developed into Man of La Mancha six years later. The plot and much of the dialogue is identical.

Other writers included Sidney Kingsley and Terence Rattigan.

== Awards and actors ==
The show was nominated for a total of 12 Emmy Awards. Julie Andrews, Rex Harrison, Carol Channing, John Gielgud, Gracie Fields, Richard Burton, Lee J. Cobb, Colleen Dewhurst, Eli Wallach, Hurd Hatfield, Judith Anderson, Hume Cronyn, Maureen O'Hara, Michael Rennie, Suzanne Storrs, Farley Granger, Fritz Weaver, and George C. Scott made appearances. Johnny Washbrook of the My Friend Flicka TV series appeared as Tom Canty in The Prince and the Pauper.

With its stage cast, DuPont Show of the Month telecast the 1958 Old Vic production of William Shakespeare's Hamlet immediately following its brief run on Broadway. Sally Benson's Junior Miss, on Broadway from 1941 to 1943 came to television on December 20, 1957, as a production of DuPont Show of the Month. Carol Lynley had the lead role of Judy Graves with Don Ameche and Joan Bennett as her parents and Susanne Sidney as Fuffy Adams. Others in the cast were Diana Lynn, Paul Ford, Jill St. John and David Wayne.

== Season 1 ==
No. overall	No. in season	Title	Directed by	Based on	Original release date
1	1	"Crescendo"	Bill Colleran	Original script by Peter Ustinov and Leslie Stevens	September 29, 1957
A British man visiting America has been detained by customs. The man doesn't understand America and is taken through a series of musical performances explaining American culture.
2	2	"The Prince And The Pauper"	Daniel Petrie	The Prince and the Pauper by Mark Twain	October 28, 1957
A peasant and a prince who happen to look identical switch places, leading to unforeseen consequences.
3	3	"Beyond This Place"	Sidney Lumet	Beyond This Place by A. J. Cronin	November 25, 1957
A man's father has been convicted of murder, and it’s up to his son to clear his name.
4	4	"The Junior Miss"	Ralph Nelson	Junior Miss by Sally Benson	December 20, 1957
A girl named Judy wants to find out about her estranged, alcoholic uncle. Eventually, she starts trying to get him romantically involved with a secretary.
5	5	"The Bridge of San Luis Rey"	Robert Mulligan	The Bridge of San Luis Rey by Thornton Wilder	January 21, 1958
A bridge in Peru collapses claiming the lives of multiple victims. A friar is convinced there’s something deeper happening and begins investigating the victims.
6	6	"Aladdin"	Raph Nelson	Aladdin	February 21, 1958
A man pretending to be Aladdin’s uncle recruits him to retrieve a magic lamp. After Aladdin uses the lamp to get with the princess, the man tries to get it back from him.
7	7	"A Tale of Two Cities"	Robert Mulligan	A Tale of Two Cities by Charles Dickens	March 27, 1958
A group of noblemen try to evade government capture during the French Revolution.
8	8	"The Red Mill"	Delbert Mann	The Red Mill by Victor Herbert	April 19, 1958
Two American boys are broke in the Netherlands, and have to work at an Inn to return to New York. The boys have to help a girl named Gretchen marry a governor.
9	9	"Wuthering Heights"	Daniel Petrie	Wuthering Heights by Emily Brontë	May 9, 1958
A young servant is mistreated by the family he was raised in until he leaves. When he grows up and becomes wealthy, he returns and terrorizes his old family.
10	10	"The Member of the Wedding"	Robert Mulligan	The Member of the Wedding by Carson McCullers	June 12, 1958
A 12-year-old girl named Frankie Addams has a brother who’s about to get married. She has dreams of moving with him and his wife to Alaska.

== Season 2 ==
No. overall	No. in season	Title	Directed by	Based on	Original release date
11	1	"Harvey"	George Schaefer	Harvey by Mary Chase	September 22, 1958
Elwood P. Dowd insists he has a 6-foot-tall talking rabbit named Harvey for a friend. When he starts embarrassing his family, they try to have him committed.
12	2	"The Count of Monte Cristo"	Sidney Lumet	The Count of Monte Cristo by Alexandre Dumas	October 28, 1958
A man namedEdmond Dantès is arrested for treason and thrown in jail. There, Edmond learns of a treasure. He plots to recover the treasure and take revenge on those who wronged him.
13	3	"The Winslow Boy"	Alex Segal	The Winslow Boy by Terence Rattigan	November 13, 1958
Ronnie Winslow is expelled from his college after being accused of stealing. The father tries to clear his son and restore honor to the Winslow family name.
14	4	"The Hasty Heart"	Tom Donovan	The Hasty Heart by John Patrick	December 18, 1958
A group of soldiers from various ethnic backgrounds are at a military hospital shortly after World War II. A new soldier from Scotland arrives with a terminal illness, and they try to make him at home.
15	5	"What Every Woman Knows"	Robert Mulligan	What Every Woman Knows by J. M. Barrie	January 28, 1959
A family catches a man sneaking into their personal library and agrees to let him use it if he marries their daughter, Maggie. Maggie then works behind the scenes to fulfill her husband's dream of getting into parliament.
16	6	"Hamlet"	Ralph Nelson	Hamlet by William Shakespeare	February 24, 1959
Prince Hamlet’s father dies and his uncle takes the throne and marries his mother. After seeing his fathers ghost, Hamlet suspects his uncle of killing his father for the throne.
17	7	"The Human Comedy"	Robert Mulligan	The Human Comedy by William Saroyan	March 28, 1959
During World War II, 14-year-old Homer Macauley is the only man at home while his brother’s at war. He decides to take a job as a telegraph boy.
18	8	"The Browning Version"	John Frankenheimer	The Browning Version by Terence Rattigan	April 23, 1959
Andrew Cocker-Harris is a professor at a school. When he ends his 18 years at the school, no one misses him, causing him to reflect on his time at the school.
19	9	"Billy Budd"	Robert Mulligan	Billy Budd by Herman Melville	May 25, 1959
After being accused of conspiring to cause a mutiny, Billy Budd accidentally strikes the accuser dead. The novella follows the court proceedings after the fact.

== Season 3 ==
No. overall	No. in season	Title	Directed by	Based on	Original release date
20	1	"Body and Soul"	Daniel Petrie	Body and Soul	September 28, 1959
Carlo Perez has ambitions to become a boxer and would do anything to win. Carlos ends up getting involved with a corrupt promoter and the mob.
21	2	"The Fallen Idol"	Silvio Narizzano	The Fallen Idol by Graham Greene	October 14, 1959
A boy named Phillipe is watched over by a butler and his wife. When the wife falls off a building and police suspect the butler, Philippe tries to wrap his head around the events.
22	3	"I, Don Quixote"	Karl Genus	Don Quixote by Miguel de Cervantes	November 9, 1959
A nobleman named Alonso Quijano decides to become a knight to uphold chivalry.
23	4	"Oliver Twist"	Daniel Petrie	Oliver Twist by Charles Dickens	December 4, 1959
A poor boy named Oliver works at an abusive factory. While trying to escape and find a better life, he gets involved in organized crime.
24	5	"Arrowsmith"	Alex Segal	Arrowsmith by Harry Sinclair Lewis	January 17, 1960
A gifted scientist has an ethical dilemma when an outbreak that threatens the world threatens those closest to him.
25	6	"Ethan Frome"	Alex Segal	Ethan Frome by Edith Wharton	February 18, 1960
A man is spending his winter in a small town in Massachusetts. During his stay he encounters a man with a limp, the story revolves around the man's backstory.
26	7	"Treasure Island"	Daniel Petrie	Treasure Island by Robert Louis Stevenson	March 5, 1960
Jim Hawkins and his mother are run out of their Inn by pirates. They discover a map to the long-lost treasure of an old pirate captain. Jim sets off with a crew to find the treasure.
27	8	"Years Ago"	Alex Segal	Years Ago by Ruth Gordon	April 21, 1960
An autobiographical look at the life of silent film actor Ruth Gordon.

== Season 4 ==
On August 21st, 1960, it was announced Show of the Month had been renewed for a fourth season. The season was originally meant to start with a show based on the Black Sox Scandal, but due to legal issues it was cancelled. A show based on the play Men in White was produced in its place. There was also a show based on Laurel & Hardy in the works, but that too was cancelled. There was no new show in December, a rerun of Harvey was broadcast instead. There’s no known episode that aired in October.

No. overall	No. in season	Title	Directed by	Based on	Original release date
28	1	"Men In White"	Don Richardson	Men in White by Sidney Kingsley	September 30, 1960
An up-and-coming surgeon is forced to choose between his career and his girlfriend.
29	2	"Heaven Can Wait"	Alex Segal	Heaven Can Wait by Harry Segall	November 15, 1960
A boxer crashes his plane and is brought up to heaven by mistake by an angel. To fix their mistake, they bring him back to Earth in the body of another man.
30	3	"The Prisoner of Zenda"	Alex Segal	The Prisoner of Zenda by Anthony Hope	January 18, 1961
When King Rudolf is kidnapped, his servants must keep up public appearances and rescue him.
31	4	"The Lincoln Murder Case"	Alex Segal	Web of Conspiracy by Theodore Roscoe	February 18, 1961
A pseudo-documentary presenting an alternative explanation that Lincoln’s cabinet orchestrated his murder.
32	5	"The Night of The Storm"	Daniel Petrie	Original script by Horton Foote	March 20, 1961
A family that makes a living off of a boring house is struck hard by economic depression. They move to Houston in hopes of a better life.
