= Teleplay =

Screenplay for a television program or series

A teleplay is a screenplay or script used in the production of a scripted television program or series. In general usage, the term is most commonly seen in reference to a standalone production, such as a television film, a television play, or an episode of an anthology series. In internal industry usage, however, all television scripts (including episodes of ongoing drama or comedy series) are teleplays, although a "teleplay by" credit may be classified into a "written by" credit depending on the circumstances of its creation.

The term first surfaced during the 1950s, as television was gaining cultural significance, to distinguish teleplays from stage plays written for theater and screenplays written for films. All three have different formats, conventions, and constraints.

== Usage ==
According to current Writers Guild of America guidelines, a television script consists of two distinct parts: "story" and "teleplay". The story comprises "basic narrative, idea, theme or outline indicating character development and action", while the teleplay consists of "individual scenes and full dialogue or monologue (including narration in connection therewith), and camera set-ups, if required". Simply put, the script distinguishes the contribution of ideas toward the story from the actual writing of the dialogue and stage directions present on the page in the finished product.

Accordingly, story and teleplay will appear as distinct credits on a television script if different people played those roles in the script's creation; if the same person or people performed both roles equally (unless they also worked on the concept with one or more people not directly involved in writing the script or developing the story concept), then the story and teleplay credits will not be used and instead a merged "written by" credit will be given. However, a "written by" credit may be given to at most only three people; if more than three people were involved, then the credits must distinguish those who were "story" contributors from those who were "teleplay" contributors.

== Format and style ==
The format is structured like a traditional screenplay, but it varies with what type of television show the script is written for. It distinguishes interchangeably between a sitcom and a drama series with how the production of the two takes place. Two types of productions being the multi-camera or a single-camera teleplay.

=== Multi-camera teleplay ===
Shows that use multi-camera teleplays are typically filmed in front of a live studio audience. Guidelines for these scripts include making all dialogue double-spaced, stage directions being printed in all-caps, and making all the scenes numbered on the top of each page. Unlike in film screenplays where one page can translate to one minute, a page on a teleplay translates to 30 seconds of screen time. Other guidelines include starting each new scene on a new page, as well as making sure each scene includes a list of characters who will appear in a particular scene. Sitcoms are traditionally filmed using a multi-camera setup.

=== Single-camera teleplay ===
The format of single-camera scripts are written in a "cinematic-style" similar to a film screenplay. The format is written with the dialogue single-spaced, and the stage directions printed in lowercase. But, like Multi-Camera Teleplays, there are act breaks that start a new scene in the next page.

==== Run-time ====
The length or run-time of a show varies for what type of production the script is writing for. Usually, a teleplay can run for 22 minutes or 45 minutes with extra time due to commercials.

== History ==
On the hour-long TV anthology drama shows of the Golden Age of Television, such as The United States Steel Hour, The Goodyear Television Playhouse, The Philco Television Playhouse, The Alcoa Hour, Armstrong Circle Theatre, and Studio One, productions often were telecast live from studios with limited scenery and other constraints similar to theatrical presentations. These constraints made a teleplay quite different from a screenplay.

However, television dramatists, such as Paddy Chayefsky, JP Miller and Tad Mosel, turned such limitations to their advantage by writing television plays with intimate situations and family conflicts characterized by naturalistic, slice of life dialogue. When seen live, such productions had a real-time quality not found in films (shot out of sequence), yet they employed tight close-ups, low-key acting and other elements not found in stage productions. For many viewers, this was equivalent to seeing live theater in their living rooms, an effect enhanced when television plays expanded from 60-minute time slots to a 90-minute series with the introduction of Playhouse 90 in the late 1950s.

Notable examples:

- The Comedian (1957)
- Days of Wine and Roses (1958)
- Playhouse 90 (1956–1960)

== See also ==
- Radio drama
