= The Bridge of San Luis Rey (DuPont Show of the Month) =

- DuPont Show of the Month episode
- Episode no.: Season 1 Episode 5
- Directed by: Robert Mulligan
- Written by: Ludi Claire (teleplay), Thornton Wilder (novella)
- Original air date: January 21, 1958

Guest appearances
- Judith Anderson as Marquesa de Montemayor; Hume Cronyn as Uncle Pio; Viveca Lindfors as Camilla

Episode chronology
← Previous "The Junior Miss"	Next → "Aladdin (DuPont Show of the Month)"

"The Bridge of San Luis Rey" was an American television play broadcast by CBS on January 21, 1958, as part of the television series, DuPont Show of the Month. It was written by Ludi Claire as an adaptation of the Thornton Wilder novel of the same name. Robert Mulligan was the director and David Susskind the producer.

== Plot ==
The teleplay is set in the early 1700s in Peru. An old rope bridge over a gorge collapses, killing five persons. Brother Juniper conducts a lengthy investigation of the lives and backgrounds of the five victims. The play follows Juniper's investigation and examines the lives prior to the accident.

A church council then examines Brother Juniper's book recounting his findings and determines the book to be heresy. Both Brother Juniper and his book are publicly burned.

== Cast ==
The cast included performances by:

- Judith Anderson as Marquesa de Montemayor
- Hume Cronyn as Uncle Pio
- Steven Hill as Esteban
- Viveca Lindfors as Camilla, la Perichole
- Kurt Kasznar as Don Andres, the Viceroy
- Theodore Bikel as Capt. Alvarado
- Rita Gam as Dona Clara, Marquesa's daughter
- Peter Cookson
- Eva Le Gallienne as the Abbess, Madre Maria
- Clifford David
- Sandra Whiteside as Pepita, the Marquesa's Indian maid
- William Marshall
- Miko Oscard

== Production ==
The program was broadcast by CBS on January 21, 1958, as part of the television series, DuPont Show of the Month. Robert Mulligan was the director. The production was reported to have used a record number of cameras and was watched by a 47% share of the available audience.

Actress Ludi Claire adapted Thornton Wilder's novel for television. Jack Gould in The New York Times credited Claire with a bold approach and "extraordinary craftsmanship." Claire ended up winning the 1958 Sylvania Television Award for best television adaptation. The production also received a Sylvania nomination as the year's outstanding telecast and two nominations for outstanding actress for the performances of Judith Anderson and Viveca Lindfors.

Judith Anderson was also nominated for an Emmy Award in the category of best single performance by an actress.

== Reception ==
In The New York Times, Jack Gould praised the production's "quality, taste and competence", and called the performances magnificent, singling out Judith Anderson and Eva Le Galliene in particular. Gould added: "Television has not known many such moments."

William Ewald of the United Press found it to be disappointing. Though he found it far better than most TV fare, he concluded that it never succeeded in exploring the book's central theme about man's need for love.
