= James Costigan =

American actor

- Born: March 31, 1926; East Los Angeles, California, United States
- Died: December 19, 2007 (aged 81); Bainbridge Island, Washington, United States
- Occupations: Screenwriter; actor; producer; director
- Known for: Love Among the Ruins

James Costigan (March 31, 1926 – December 19, 2007) was an American television actor and Emmy Award-winning television screenwriter. His writing credits include the television movies Eleanor and Franklin and Love Among the Ruins.

== Early life ==
Costigan was born on March 31, 1926, in East Los Angeles, where his parents owned and operated a hardware store. He first achieved some level of success in the 1950s, when he came to write for television anthology series, such as Studio One and Kraft Television Theatre.

== Career ==
Costigan won his first Emmy for original teleplay in 1959 for Little Moon of Alban, a segment which appeared as part of the Hallmark Hall of Fame. He earned a second Emmy nomination in 1959 for his script adaptation of The Turn of the Screw. He did not win, but Ingrid Bergman won an Emmy for her performance in The Turn of the Screw. He increasingly began writing for the stage as the format of television began to change. His Broadway credits included Baby Want a Kiss, a 1964 comedy which starred Joanne Woodward and Paul Newman.

He returned to screenwriting for television in the early 1970s. His 1970s work included A War of Children, written in 1972, which was about two families, one Roman Catholic and one Protestant, in Northern Ireland, whose long time friendship is threatened by sectarian violence.

He won a second Emmy Award for Love Among the Ruins, a 1975 television movie set in Edwardian England, which starred Katharine Hepburn and Laurence Olivier. His third Emmy win was for Eleanor and Franklin (1976), a two-part, four-hour television drama focusing on the lives of Franklin and Eleanor Roosevelt.

After the Roosevelt series, many of his subsequent screenplays for television and feature films were written under the name of Ivan Davis. He also began collaborating with other scenarists, including John Huston on the film adaptation of Thornton Wilder's novel Mr. North.

== Death ==
James Costigan died on December 19, 2007, aged 81, at his home in Bainbridge Island, Washington, of heart failure.
