= Days of Wine and Roses (Playhouse 90) =

- Playhouse 90 episode
- Piper Laurie in Days of Wine and Roses
- Episode no.: Season 3 Episode 2
- Directed by: John Frankenheimer
- Written by: JP Miller
- Production code: 081
- Original air date: October 2, 1958

Guest appearances
- Cliff Robertson as Joe Clay; Piper Laurie as Kirsten Arnesen Clay; Charles Bickford as Ellis Arnesen

Episode chronology
← Previous "The Plot to Kill Stalin"	Next → "The Time of Your Life"

"Days of Wine and Roses" was a 1958 American teleplay by JP Miller which dramatized the problems of alcoholism. John Frankenheimer directed the cast headed by Cliff Robertson, Piper Laurie, and Charles Bickford.

== Plot ==
The drama depicts the slow deterioration of a marriage due to alcoholism as ambitious ad man Joe Clay gets his wife Kirsten to join him in drinking bouts that begin to destroy their lives.

== Cast ==
- Cliff Robertson as Joe Clay
- Piper Laurie as Kirsten Arnesen Clay
- Charles Bickford as Ellis Arnesen
- Marc Lawrence as Scarface
- Malcolm Atterbury as Jim Hungerford
- Martha Wentworth as Mrs. Nolan
- Mimi Gibson as Debbie Clay
- Dick Elliott as Mr. Trayner
- Douglas Henderson as Rad

== Production ==
Cliff Robertson and Piper Laurie in John Frankenheimer's 1958 production of JP Miller's Days of Wine and Roses for Playhouse 90.

The 90-minute telecast was presented live with tape inserts on October 2, 1958, and it was the second episode of the third season of the anthology series Playhouse 90 on CBS. Costume changes were made possible because Frankenheimer taped the Alcoholics Anonymous scenes on the day before the live telecast. During a rehearsal, according to Miller, the producer Fred Coe watched as Robertson and Laurie "played some of the most realistic drunk scenes ever seen anywhere. Frankenheimer was ecstatic but was quickly grounded by Coe's comment 'John, you've got the Wine. Now let's see if you can get the Roses.'"

John J. O'Connor reviewed the 1983 video cassette release in The New York Times:

Mr. Miller reveals that the idea for the play came to him one sleepless night when "I got to thinking about an uncle of mine who was a drunk." He settled on two young people who like to drink and then "fall in love with the bottle more than each other."... As Mr. Robertson observes with admirable detachment, it is raw and imperfect but "it was emotionally honest." Using the framework of an Alcoholics Anonymous meeting, Joe gets up to address the gathering and his story is told in flashbacks that begin 10 years earlier. He meets Kirsten (Miss Laurie) at a business cocktail party. He is a young advertising executive. She is a bright secretary whose self-improvement activities have reached the point of her reading the poetry of Edna St. Vincent Millay. The drinking gets serious early on, and gradually their lives dissolve in puddles of cheap liquor. Her father (Mr. Bickford) tries to help, but the process has gone too far for mere sympathy to help...Several of the scenes remain searing.

JP Miller found his title in the 1896 poem "Vitae Summa Brevis Spem Nos Vetet Incohare Longam" by the English writer Ernest Dowson (1867–1900):

They are not long, the weeping and the laughter,
Love and desire and hate;
I think they have no portion in us after
We pass the gate.

They are not long, the days of wine and roses:
Out of a misty dream
Our path emerges for a while, then closes
Within a dream.

== Critical reception ==
The episode received favorable reviews from television critics. Jack Gould, in The New York Times, praised the script, director, and cast:

It was a brilliant and compelling work...Mr. Miller's dialogue was especially fine, natural, vivid and understated. Miss Laurie's performance was enough to make the flesh crawl, yet it also always elicited deep sympathy. Her interpretation of the young wife just a shade this side of delirium tremens--the flighty dancing around the room, her weakness of character and moments of anxiety and her charm when she was sober--was a superlative accomplishment. Miss Laurie is moving into the forefront of our most gifted young actresses. Mr. Robertson achieved first-rate contrast between the sober man fighting to hold on and the hopeless drunk whose only courage came from the bottle. His scene in the greenhouse, where he tried to find the bottle that he had hidden in the flower pot, was particularly good...John Frankenheimer's direction was magnificent. His every touch implemented the emotional suspense but he never let the proceedings get out of hand or merely become sensational.

== Adaptations ==
=== Film ===
A film adaptation of the teleplay was produced in 1962 by Martin Manulis with Blake Edwards directing Jack Lemmon, Lee Remick, Charles Bickford, and Jack Klugman. Bickford was the only member of the TV cast to repeat his role in the movie. When Frankenheimer was not chosen to direct the movie, his agent said "John, they say you're not a comedy director." (Lemmon and Edwards, prior to 1962, were mainly associated with comedies.) The film featured a song of the same name by Henry Mancini and Johnny Mercer.

Some critics observed that the movie lacked the impact of the original television production. For DVD Journal, D.K. Holm described the numerous changes that altered the original considerably when the material was filmed:

Newer does not necessarily mean better. When the opportunity arose to make a film version of JP Miller's powerful TV drama Days of Wine and Roses, actor Jack Lemmon suggested that the studio hire Blake Edwards (according to Edwards, that is) rather than the Playhouse 90 production's original director John Frankenheimer. On the big screen, Roses began as a Fox project, but ended at Warner Bros. when the Fox studio started going down the Nile with Cleopatra. With the advent of Lemmon's participation, little remained of the founding teleplay...Lemmon, too, had been in a long string of comedies, and it's easy to assume that both filmmakers were using the opportunity to "stretch." Unfortunately, Edwards, who is kind of a combination of George Stevens (comedy director turned prestige filmmaker) and Vincente Minnelli (excitable content with no distinctive visual style), tilted the original material towards schmaltz, from the comically lush theme-song by Henry Mancini to the exaggerated binge scenes. According to one Lemmon biography, the actor felt a little bad about the fact that his friend Cliff Robertson, who had appeared in the TV production, wasn't invited to be in the movie, but the studio insisted on a certified star for the film...What's missing is the calm plausibility of the original TV broadcast, revived briefly on cable TV in the 1990s.

=== Musical ===
A musical adaptation based on the teleplay and subsequent film was produced by the Atlantic Theater Company in 2023, starring Kelli O'Hara as Kirsten and Brian d'Arcy James as Joe. The musical has a book by Craig Lucas and music and lyrics by Adam Guettel, the same writing team behind The Light in the Piazza, and is directed by Michael Greif. It opened May 5, 2023.

== Revivals ==
In 2003, Rachel Wood directed the New York stage premiere of Days of Wine and Roses, an off-Broadway production by the Boomerang Theatre Company. In 2005, the Northern Irish writer Owen McCafferty moved Days of Wine and Roses to London in the 1960s, reworking it to focus on a young couple just arrived from Belfast. That stage version had a West End premiere at the Donmar Warehouse directed by Peter Gill, who had previously staged McCafferty's National Theatre hit Scenes from the Big Picture.

== Legacy ==
The Criterion Collection included the teleplay as part of a special edition three-disc box set titled The Golden Age of Television, which was part of a PBS anthology series. In addition to the teleplay, there is an introduction featuring interviews with the cast and crew about the production.

== See also ==
- Days of Wine and Roses (film, 1962)
