= Cecil Smith (writer) =

Cecil Smith (May 22, 1917 – July 11, 2009) was an American journalist, critic, screenwriter, radio play author, television host, and World War II military officer and bomber pilot. He was the longtime television critic for the Los Angeles Times from the 1950s through the 1980s. Media scholar Melissa Crawley in her book The American Television Critic (2017, McFarland & Company), stated that Smith along with Hal Humphrey were "two of the most influential" television critics of their era in criticism. At the time of his death in 2009, critic Howard Rosenberg stated that Smith "was one of the giants in the business".

== Early life, education, and career ==
Cecil Smith was born in Marlow, Oklahoma on May 22, 1917. He moved with his family to Los Angeles and attended Santa Monica High School. He earned degrees from Stanford University and the University of California, Los Angeles. He began his career writing radio plays from 1938 through 1941. He then served as a captain in the United States Army Air Forces during World War II; flying a B-24 Liberator in the Pacific War.

After the war, Smith worked as screenwriter in television; penning more than 50 scripts for American television. He concurrently joined the staff of the Los Angeles Times in 1947 as a features writer and reporter. In 1958 he began writing his own television criticism column for that newspaper and was made entertainment editor. He continued in that role until 1964 when he was made drama critic for the Los Angeles Times. He remained in that role for the next five years, until he was appointed the paper's television critic and a columnist for The Times Syndicate in 1969; roles he continued in until his retirement in 1982.

For PBS Smith hosted two seasons of the program Cecil Smith on Drama (1965–1966).

== Personal life and death ==
Cecil's first marriage ended in divorce. He married his second wife Cleo Mandicos in the late 1950s. Cleo was Lucille Ball's first cousin and Lucille introduced the pair to each other in Las Vegas. After their marriage, they had two children together; a daughter, Tina, and a son, Marcus. Cleo worked as a producer and executive on several of Lucille Ball's radio and television programs. Cecil appeared as himself in the 1970 television episode "Lucy Meets The Burtons" in the series Here's Lucy, and his son Marcus later appeared in the 1972 episode "Lucy and Her Prince Charming" as the ring bearer in Lucy's wedding.

Cecil Smith died in San Luis Obispo, California on July 11, 2009.
