= Piper Laurie =

American actress (1932–2023)

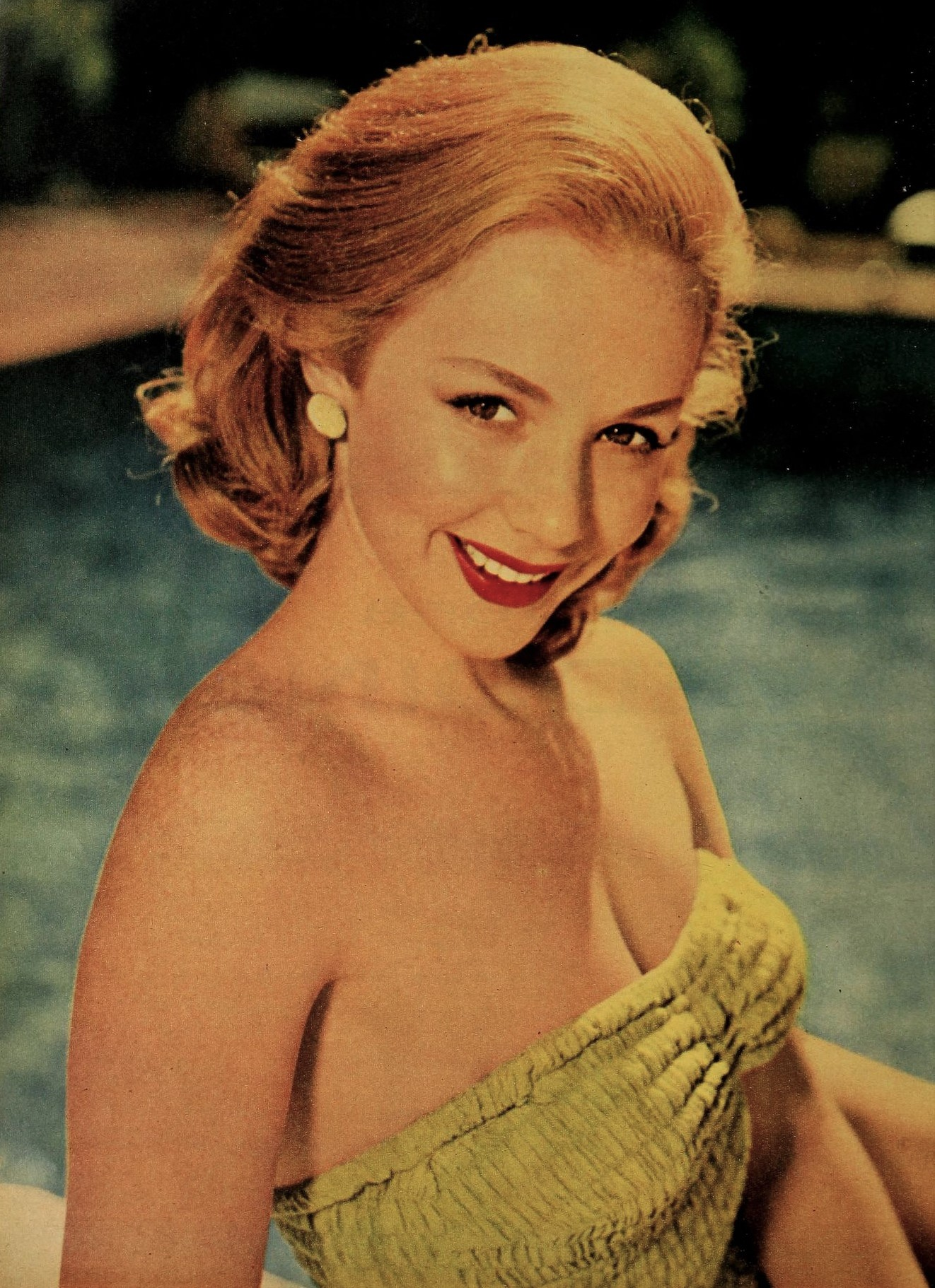
- Laurie in 1954
- Born: Rosetta Jacobs; January 22, 1932; Detroit, Michigan, U.S.
- Died: October 14, 2023 (aged 91); Los Angeles, California, U.S.
- Occupation: Actress
- Years active: 1949–1965; 1976–2023
- Spouse: Joe Morgenstern (m. 1962; div. 1982)
- Children: 1

Piper Laurie (born Rosetta Jacobs; January 22, 1932 – October 14, 2023) was an American actress. She is known for her roles in the films The Hustler (1961), Carrie (1976), and Children of a Lesser God (1986), and the miniseries The Thorn Birds (1983). She played Kirsten Arnesen in the original TV production of Days of Wine and Roses, and Catherine Martell in the television series Twin Peaks.

She received various accolades, including a Primetime Emmy Award and a Golden Globe Award, in addition to nominations for three Academy Awards and a BAFTA Award.

== Early life ==
Piper Laurie was born Rosetta Jacobs in Detroit, Michigan, on January 22, 1932. Laurie was the younger of two daughters born to furniture dealer Alfred Jacobs and his wife, Charlotte Sadie (née Alperin) Jacobs. Her paternal grandparents were Jewish immigrants from Poland and her maternal grandparents were Jewish immigrants from Russia.

In her 2011 autobiography Learning to Live Out Loud, Laurie said she was born in her family's one-bedroom walk-up on Tyler Street in Detroit. To combat her shyness, her parents provided her with weekly elocution lessons.

Laurie's mother and grandmother placed Laurie's older sister in a sanitarium for her asthma. Laurie was sent along to keep her company.

== Career ==
In 1949, Jacobs signed a contract with Universal Studios, and changed her screen name to Piper Laurie, which she used thereafter. Her breakout role was in Louisa (1950) with Ronald Reagan, whom she dated briefly before his marriage to Nancy Davis. In her autobiography, she wrote that she lost her virginity to him. Several other roles followed: Francis Goes to the Races (1951, co-starring Donald O'Connor); Son of Ali Baba (1951, co-starring Tony Curtis); and Ain't Misbehavin' (1955, co-starring Rory Calhoun).

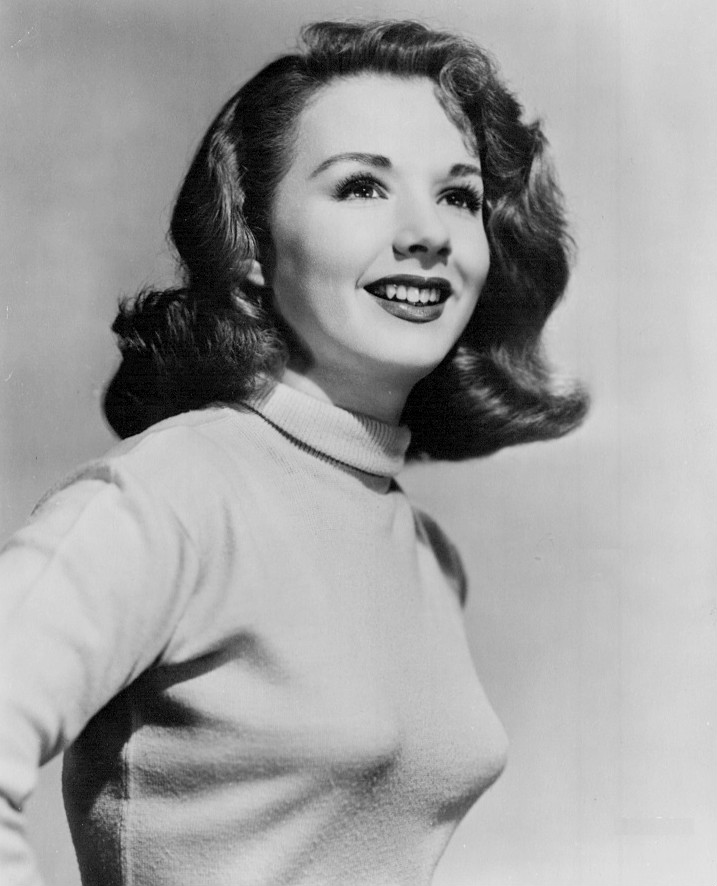
Laurie in 1951

To polish her image, Universal Studios told gossip columnists that Laurie bathed in milk and ate flower petals to protect her luminous skin. Discouraged by the lack of substantial film roles, she moved to New York City to study acting and to seek work on the stage and in television. She appeared in Twelfth Night, produced by Hallmark Hall of Fame, in "Days of Wine and Roses" with Cliff Robertson, presented by Playhouse 90 on October 2, 1958 (in the film their roles were played by Jack Lemmon and Lee Remick), and in Winterset, presented by Playhouse 90 in 1959.

Laurie was lured back to Hollywood by the offer to co-star with Paul Newman in The Hustler, released in 1961. She played Newman's girlfriend, Sarah Packard, and for her performance, she received an Academy Award nomination for Best Actress. Substantial movie roles did not come her way after The Hustler, so she and her husband moved to New York. In 1964, she appeared in two medical dramas—as Alicia Carter in The Eleventh Hour episode "My Door Is Locked and Bolted", and as Alice Marin in the Breaking Point episode "The Summer House". In 1965, she starred in a Broadway revival of Tennessee Williams's The Glass Menagerie, opposite Maureen Stapleton, Pat Hingle, and George Grizzard.

Laurie did not appear in another feature film until she accepted the role of religious fanatic Margaret White in the horror film Carrie (1976). She received an Oscar nomination for Best Supporting Actress for her performance. The commercial success of the film, and recognition for her performance, relaunched her career. Her co-star Sissy Spacek praised her acting skill: "She is a remarkable actress. She never does what you expect her to do—she always surprises you with her approach to a scene."

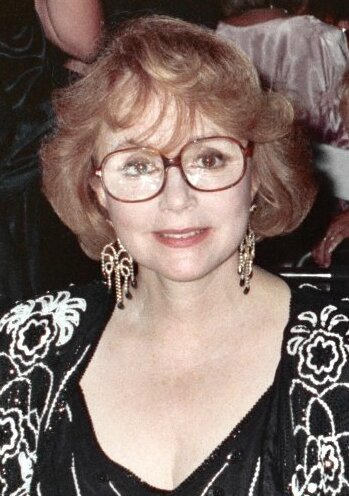
Laurie in 1990

In 1979, Laurie appeared as Mary Horton in the Australian movie Tim opposite Mel Gibson. After her 1981 divorce, Laurie moved to California. She received a third Oscar nomination for her portrayal of Mrs. Norman in Children of a Lesser God (1986). The same year, she was awarded an Emmy for her performance in Promise, a television movie, co-starring James Garner and James Woods. She had a featured role in the Off-Broadway production of The Destiny of Me in 1992, and returned to Broadway for Lincoln Center's acclaimed 2002 revival of Paul Osborn's Morning's at Seven, with Julie Hagerty, Buck Henry, Frances Sternhagen, and Estelle Parsons.

In 1990–1991, Laurie starred as the devious Catherine Martell in David Lynch's television series Twin Peaks. She also appeared in Other People's Money with Gregory Peck (1991), and in horror maestro Dario Argento's first American film Trauma (1993). She played George Clooney's character's mother on ER. In 1997, she appeared in the film A Christmas Memory with Patty Duke, and in 1998, she appeared in the sci-fi thriller The Faculty.

Laurie made guest appearances on television shows such as Frasier, Matlock, State of Grace, and Will & Grace. Laurie also appeared in Cold Case and in a 2001 episode of Law & Order: Special Victims Unit titled "Care", in which she played an adoptive mother and foster grandmother who killed one of the foster granddaughters in her daughter's charge and who abused her adoptive son and foster grandchildren.

She returned to the big screen for independent films, such as Eulogy (2004) and The Dead Girl (2006), opposite actress Toni Collette. In 2010, she played Rainn Wilson's mother in Hesher, and in 2018, she had a supporting role in White Boy Rick as the grandmother of the title character.

== Personal life ==
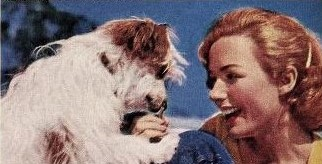
Laurie with her dog Sashay in 1954

Laurie was married to New York Herald Tribune entertainment writer and Wall Street Journal movie critic Joe Morgenstern. They met shortly after the release of The Hustler in 1961 when Morgenstern interviewed her during the film's promotion. They soon began dating, and nine months after the interview, they were married on January 21, 1962. When no substantial roles came her way after The Hustler, she and Morgenstern moved to Woodstock, New York. In 1971, they adopted a daughter. In 1982, the couple divorced, after which she moved to the Hollywood area and continued working in films and television.

She had previously dated actor and future U.S. president Ronald Reagan.

In 1962, she was Harvard's Hasty Pudding Woman of the Year. In 2000, she received the Spirit of Hope Award in Korea for her service during the Korean War. She appeared at the September 2014 Mid-Atlantic Nostalgia Convention in Hunt Valley, Maryland.

Laurie was also a sculptor who worked with marble and clay.

=== Death ===
Having been unwell for some time, Laurie died in Los Angeles on October 14, 2023, at age 91.

== Filmography ==
=== Film ===
Year	Title	Role	Notes	Ref.
1950	Louisa	Cathy Norton	Film debut	
1950	The Milkman	Chris Abbott		
1951	Francis Goes to the Races	Frances Travers		
1951	The Prince Who Was a Thief	Tina		
1952	No Room for the Groom	Lee Kingshead		
1952	Has Anybody Seen My Gal	Millicent Blaisdell		
1952	Son of Ali Baba	Princess Azura of Fez / Kiki		
1953	The Mississippi Gambler	Angelique "Leia" Dureau		
1953	The Golden Blade	Khairuzan		
1954	Dangerous Mission	Louise Graham		
1954	Johnny Dark	Liz Fielding		
1954	Dawn at Socorro	Rannah Hayes		
1955	Smoke Signal	Laura Evans		
1955	Ain't Misbehavin'	Sarah Bernhardt Hatfield		
1957	Kelly and Me	Mina Van Runkel		
1957	Until They Sail	Delia Leslie Friskett		
1961	The Hustler	Sarah Packard	Nominated—Academy Award for Best Actress; Nominated—BAFTA Award for Best Foreign Actress; Nominated—Golden Laurel Award for Top Female Dramatic Performance (2nd Place); Nominated—New York Film Critics Circle Award for Best Actress (3rd Place)	
1976	Carrie	Margaret White	Nominated—Academy Award for Best Supporting Actress; Nominated—Golden Globe Award for Best Supporting Actress – Motion Picture	
1976	The Woman Rebel	Margaret Sanger		
1977	Ruby	Ruby Claire		
1979	Tim	Mary Horton		
1981	The Bunker	Magda Goebbels		
1985	Return to Oz	Aunt Em		
1986	Children of a Lesser God	Mrs. Willa Norman	Nominated—Academy Award for Best Supporting Actress	
1988	Appointment with Death	Emily Boynton		
1988	Tiger Warsaw	Frances Warsaw		
1989	Dream a Little Dream	Gena Ettinger		
1991	Other People's Money	Bea Sullivan		
1992	Storyville	Constance Fowler		
1992	Rich in Love	Vera Delmage		
1993	Trauma	Adriana Petrescu	Nominated—Fangoria Chainsaw Award for Best Supporting Actress	
1993	Wrestling Ernest Hemingway	Georgia		
1995	The Grass Harp	Dolly Talbo	Southeastern Film Critics Association Award for Best Supporting Actress	
1995	The Crossing Guard	Helen Booth		
1998	The Faculty	Mrs. Olson		
2004	Eulogy	Charlotte Collins		
2006	The Dead Girl	Arden's mother		
2007	Hounddog	Grammie		
2009	Saving Grace B. Jones	Marta Shank		
2010	Hesher	Madeleine Forney, T.J.'s grandmother		
2010	Another Harvest Moon	June		
2012	Bad Blood	Milly Lathtrop		
2018	Snapshots	Rose Muller		
2018	White Boy Rick	Vera Wershe		

=== Television ===
Year	Title	Role	Notes	Ref.
1955	The Best of Broadway	Billie Moore	Episode: "Broadway"	
1955	Robert Montgomery Presents	Stacey Spender	Episode: "Quality Town"	
1956	Front Row Center	Judy Jones	Episode: "Winter Dreams"	
1956–1961	General Electric Theater	Various	3 episodes	
1957	Studio One	Ruth Cornelius	Episode: "The Deaf Heart"; Nominated—Primetime Emmy Award for Actress – Best Single Performance – Lead or Support	
1957	Playhouse 90	Ruth McAdam	Episode: "The Ninth Day"	
1958	Playhouse 90	Kirsten Arnesen Clay	Episode: "Days of Wine and Roses"; Nominated—Primetime Emmy Award for Best Single Performance by an Actress	
1959	Westinghouse Desilu Playhouse	Eileen Gorman	Episode: "The Innocent Assassin"	
1960–1963	The United States Steel Hour	Edna Cartey	2 episodes	
1963	Naked City	Mary Highmark	Episode: "Howard Running Bear Is a Turtle"	
1963	Bob Hope Presents the Chrysler Theatre	Lee Wiley	Episode: "Something About Lee Wiley"	
1963	Ben Casey	Kathleen Dooley	Episode: "Light Up the Dark Corners"	
1964	The Eleventh Hour	Alicia Carter	Episode: "My Door Is Locked and Bolted"	
1964	Breaking Point	Alice Marin	Episode: "The Summer House"	
1977	In the Matter of Karen Ann Quinlan	Julie Quinlan	Television movie	
1978	Rainbow	Ethel Gumm	Television movie	
1980	Skag	Jo Skagska	6 episodes	
1981	The Bunker	Magda Goebbels	Television movie Nominated—Primetime Emmy Award for Outstanding Supporting Actress in a Limited Series or a Special	
1982	Mae West	Matilda West	Television movie	
1983	The Thorn Birds	Anne Mueller	3 episodes Nominated—Golden Globe Award for Best Supporting Actress – Series, Miniseries or Television Film; Nominated—Primetime Emmy Award for Outstanding Supporting Actress in a Limited Series or a Special	
1983	St. Elsewhere	Fran Singleton	3 episodes Nominated—Primetime Emmy Award for Outstanding Supporting Actress in a Drama Series	
1985	Hotel	Jessica	Episode: "Illusions"	
1985	Murder, She Wrote	Peggy Shannon	Episode: "Murder at the Oasis"	
1985	Tender Is the Night	Elsie Speers	Episode: "1925"	
1985	Love, Mary	Christine Groda	Television movie	
1985	Toughlove	Darlene Marsh	Television movie	
1985–1986	The Twilight Zone	Aunt Neva	Episode: "The Burning Man"	
1985–1986	The Twilight Zone	Gramma (voice)	Episode: "Gramma" (uncredited)	
1986	Matlock	Claire Leigh	Episode: "The Judge"	
1986	Promise	Annie Gilbert	Television movie Primetime Emmy Award for Outstanding Supporting Actress in a Miniseries or a Special; Nominated—Golden Globe Award for Best Supporting Actress – Series, Miniseries or Television Film	
1988	Go Toward the Light	Margo	Television movie	
1989	Beauty and the Beast	Mrs. Davis	Episode: "A Gentle Rain"	
1990	Rising Son	Martha Robinson	Television Movie	
1990–1991	Twin Peaks	Catherine Martell / Mr. Tojamura (credited as Fumio Yamaguchi)	27 episodes Golden Globe Award for Best Supporting Actress – Series, Miniseries or Television Film (1990); Nominated—Primetime Emmy Award for Outstanding Lead Actress in a Drama Series (1990); Nominated—Primetime Emmy Award for Outstanding Supporting Actress in a Drama Series (1991); Nominated—Soap Opera Digest Award for Outstanding Actress – Prime Time (1991–1992)	
1993	Lies and Lullabies	Margaret Kinsey	Television movie	
1994	Traps	Cora Trapchek	5 episodes	
1994	Frasier	Marianne (voice)	Episode: "Guess Who's Coming to Breakfast"	
1994	Shadows of Desire	Ellis Snow	Television movie	
1995	Fighting For My Daughter	Judge Edna Burton	Television movie	
1995–1996	ER	Sarah Ross	2 episodes	
1996	Diagnosis: Murder	A.D.A. Susan Turner	Episode: "The ABC's of Murder"	
1997	Intensity	Miriam Braynard	Television movie	
1997	Touched by an Angel	Annie Doyle	Episode: "Venice"	
1997	A Christmas Memory	Jennie	Television movie	
1999	Brother's Keeper	Jane Waide	Episode: "Everybody Says I Love You"	
1999	Frasier	Mrs. Mulhern	Episode: "Dr. Nora"; Nominated—Primetime Emmy Award for Outstanding Guest Actress in a Comedy Series	
1999	Inherit the Wind	Sarah Brady	Television movie	
2000	Will & Grace	Sharon	Episode: "There But for the Grace of Grace"	
2000	Possessed	Aunt Hanna	Television movie	
2001	Midwives	Cheryl Visco	Television movie	
2001	The Last Brickmaker in America	Ruth Anne	Television movie	
2001	Law & Order: Special Victims Unit	Dorothy Rudd	Episode: "Care"	
2002	State of Grace	Aunt Sophie	Episode: "Where the Boys Are"	
2004	Dead Like Me	Nina Rommey	Episode: "Forget Me Not"	
2005	Cold Case	Rose 2005	Episode: "Best Friends"	
2018	MacGyver	Edith	Episode: "Skyscraper – Power"	

=== Stage ===
Year	Title	Role	Notes
1964	Rosemary	Flo	York Playhouse, Off-Broadway
1964	The Alligators	Candy Simpson	York Playhouse, Off-Broadway
1965	The Glass Menagerie	The Daughter	Brooks Atkinson Theatre, Broadway
1990	The Last Flapper	Zelda Fitzgerald	National Tour
1992	The Destiny of Me	Rena	Circle Repertory Company, Off-Broadway
2002	Morning's at Seven	Esther Crampton	Lyceum Theatre, Broadway

=== Audio dramas ===
Year	Title	Role	Notes	Ref.
2022–2023	Around the Sun	Grandma / Alien Maude	2 episodes	

== Awards and nominations ==
Year	Award	Category	Nominated work	Results	Ref.
1961	Academy Awards	Best Actress	The Hustler	Nominated	
1976	Academy Awards	Best Supporting Actress	Carrie	Nominated	
1986	Academy Awards	Best Supporting Actress	Children of a Lesser God	Nominated	
1961	British Academy Film Awards	Best Foreign Actress	The Hustler	Nominated	
1994	Fangoria Chainsaw Awards	Best Supporting Actress	Trauma	Nominated	
1976	Golden Globe Awards	Best Supporting Actress – Motion Picture	Carrie	Nominated	
1983	Golden Globe Awards	Best Supporting Actress in a Series, Miniseries or Motion Picture Made for Television	The Thorn Birds	Nominated	
1986	Golden Globe Awards	Best Supporting Actress in a Series, Miniseries or Motion Picture Made for Television	Promise	Nominated	
1990	Golden Globe Awards	Best Supporting Actress in a Series, Miniseries or Motion Picture Made for Television	Twin Peaks	Won	
1962	Hasty Pudding Theatricals	Woman of the Year	—N/a	Won	
2018	Los Angeles IFS Film Festival	Best Actress	Snapshots	Won	
1961	New York Film Critics Circle Awards	Best Actress	The Hustler	Nominated	
1958	Primetime Emmy Awards	Actress – Best Single Performance – Lead or Support	Studio One (Episode: "The Deaf Heart")	Nominated	
1959	Primetime Emmy Awards	Best Single Performance by an Actress	Playhouse 90 (Episode: "Days of Wine and Roses")	Nominated	
1981	Primetime Emmy Awards	Outstanding Supporting Actress in a Limited Series or a Special	The Bunker	Nominated	
1983	Primetime Emmy Awards	Outstanding Supporting Actress in a Limited Series or a Special	The Thorn Birds	Nominated	
1984	Primetime Emmy Awards	Outstanding Supporting Actress in a Drama Series	St. Elsewhere	Nominated	
1987	Primetime Emmy Awards	Outstanding Supporting Actress in a Miniseries or a Special	Promise	Won	
1990	Primetime Emmy Awards	Outstanding Lead Actress in a Drama Series	Twin Peaks	Nominated	
1991	Primetime Emmy Awards	Outstanding Supporting Actress in a Drama Series	Twin Peaks	Nominated	
1999	Primetime Emmy Awards	Outstanding Guest Actress in a Comedy Series	Frasier (Episode: "Dr. Nora")	Nominated	
2018	RiverRun International Film Festival	Master of Cinema Award	—N/a	Won	
1999	Seattle International Film Festival	Best Actress	The Mao Game	Won	
1996	Southeastern Film Critics Association Awards	Best Supporting Actress	The Grass Harp	Won (Note: Tied with Joan Allen for The Crucible.)	
