= Riders to the Sea (disambiguation) =

Riders to the Sea is a 1904 play by John Millington Synge.

Riders to the Sea may also refer to:

- Riders to the Sea (opera), a 1937 one-act opera by Ralph Vaughan Williams, based on the play
- Riders to the Sea (1936 film), a British short film, based on the play
- Riders to the Sea (1960 film), an American-made drama television film, based on the play
