= The Sound of Jazz =

- Title Card for The Sound of Jazz
- Presented by: John Crosby
- Starring: Count Basie; Billie Holiday; Thelonious Monk; Red Allen; Jimmy Giuffre
- Country of origin: United States
- Original language: English
- No. of episodes: 1

Production
- Executive producers: Nat Hentoff; Whitney Balliett; Charles H. Schultz
- Camera setup: Multi-camera
- Running time: 54 minutes

Original release
- Network: CBS
- Release: December 8, 1957

"The Sound of Jazz" is a 1957 edition of the CBS television series The Seven Lively Arts and was one of the first major programs featuring jazz to air on American network television.

== Overview ==
The one-hour program aired on Sunday, December 8, 1957, live from CBS Studio 58, the Town Theater at 851 Ninth Avenue in New York City. The show was hosted by New York Herald Tribune media critic John Crosby, directed by Jack Smight, and produced by Robert Herridge. Jazz writers Nat Hentoff and Whitney Balliett were consultants.

The Sound of Jazz features performances by musicians from the swing era, including Count Basie, Lester Young, Ben Webster, Billie Holiday, Jo Jones, and Coleman Hawkins; Chicago-style players of the same era, such as Henry "Red" Allen, Vic Dickenson, and Pee Wee Russell; and modern jazz musicians such as Gerry Mulligan, Thelonious Monk, and Jimmy Giuffre. These players played separately but also joined to combine styles in one group, such as Red Allen's group and the group backing Billie Holiday on "Fine and Mellow". The show's performance of "Fine and Mellow" reunited Holiday with her friend Lester Young for the final time. Jazz critic Nat Hentoff recalled that during rehearsals Holiday and Young kept to opposite sides of the room. Young was very weak, and Hentoff told him to skip the big band section of the show and that he could sit while performing in the group with Holiday.

During the performance of "Fine and Mellow", Webster played the first solo. "Then", Hentoff remembered:

Lester got up, and he played the purest blues I have ever heard, and [he and Holiday] were looking at each other, their eyes were sort of interlocked, and she was sort of nodding and half–smiling. It was as if they were both remembering what had been—whatever that was. And in the control room we were all crying.

When the show was over, they went their separate ways. Within two years, both Young and Holiday had died.

Noting that the cameras were employed as "straight reportorial tools", Jack Gould observed in a review in The New York Times, "It was the art of video improvisation wedded to the art of musical improvisation; the effect was an hour of enormously creative and fresh TV."

The album version of The Sound of Jazz telecast is derived from a rehearsal (recorded on December 4) that preceded the telecast held at Columbia's 30th Street studios) and is not the soundtrack. The album was released by Columbia in 1958. The recording does not include all of the performers present on the telecast (Mulligan refused to participate because no additional payment was involved) and includes several who were not on the show. Bassist Walter Page rehearsed and is featured on the album, but he collapsed on the way to the studio for the telecast.

== Personnel ==
- Trumpet – Red Allen, Emmett Berry, Doc Cheatham, Roy Eldridge, Joe Newman, Rex Stewart, Joe Wilder
- Trombone – Bob Brookmeyer, Vic Dickenson, Benny Morton, Frank Rehak (LP only), Dickie Wells
- Clarinet – Jimmy Giuffre, Pee Wee Russell
- Alto saxophone – Earle Warren
- Tenor saxophone – Jimmy Giuffre, Coleman Hawkins, Ben Webster, Lester Young
- Baritone saxophone – Harry Carney (LP only), Jimmy Giuffre, Gerry Mulligan (not on LP)
- Guitar – Danny Barker, Freddie Green, Jim Hall
- Piano – Count Basie, Thelonious Monk, Nat Pierce, Mal Waldron
- Double bass – Jim Atlas, Milt Hinton, Eddie Jones, Ahmed Abdul-Malik, Walter Page (LP only)
- Drums – Osie Johnson, Jo Jones, Ryan Nelson
- Vocals – Billie Holiday, Jimmy Rushing

== Songs ==
=== On VHS/DVD ===
- "Open All Night (aka Fast and Happy Blues)" – Count Basie All Stars: Emmett Berry, Doc Cheatham, Joe Newman, Joe Wilder (tp); Roy Eldridge (tp, fl, hn); Vic Dickenson, Benny Morton, Dicky Wells (tb); Earl Warren (as); Coleman Hawkins, Ben Webster (ts); Gerry Mulligan (bs); Count Basie (p); Freddie Green (g); Eddie Jones (b); Jo Jones (d)
- "The Count Blues" – Basie, Green and E. Jones playing as John Crosby introduces the show.
- "Wild Man Blues" – Red Allen, Rex Stewart (tp); Pee Wee Russell (cl); Coleman Hawkins (ts); Vic Dickenson (tb); Milt Hinton (b); Danny Barker (g); Nat Pierce (p)
- "Rosetta" – Same personnel as "Wild Man Blues"
- "Dickie's Dream" – Same personnel as "Open All Night"
- "Blue Monk" – Thelonious Monk (p); Ahmed Abdul Malik (b); Osie Johnson (d) (does not appear on 2003 idem DVD release)
- "I Left My Baby" – Jimmy Rushing (v), with Count Basie All Stars (same personnel as "Open All Night")
- "Fine and Mellow" – Billie Holiday (v), with Mal Waldron All Stars: Roy Eldridge, Doc Cheatham (tp); Vic Dickenson (alto trombone); Coleman Hawkins, Ben Webster, Lester Young (ts); Gerry Mulligan (bs); Mal Waldron (p); Milt Hinton (b); Osie Johnson (d)
- "The Train and the River" – Jimmy Giuffre Trio: Jimmy Giuffre (cl, ts, bs); Jim Hall (g); Jim Atlas (b)
- "Blues My Naughty Sweetie Gave to Me" (appears on idem DVD release, 2003)– Jimmy Giuffre, Pee Wee Russell (cl); Jo Jones (d); Danny Barker (g); Milt Hinton (b).

Personnel and tracks listed on

=== On the 1958 LP ===
The Sound of Jazz

Soundtrack album by Various
- Released: 1958
- Recorded: December 4, 1957
- Genre: Jazz
- Length: 41:37
- Label: Columbia

Professional ratings
Review scores
| Source | Rating |
|---|---|
| Disc | 4.5/5 stars |
| Tom Hull | A |

Side 1

1. "Wild Man Blues" (Louis Armstrong, Jelly Roll Morton) – 4:46
2. "Rosetta" (William Henri Woode, Earl Hines) – 4:56
3. "Fine and Mellow" (Billie Holiday) – 6:19
4. "Blues" (Jimmy Giuffre, Pee Wee Russell) – 6:52

Side 2

1. "I Left my Baby" (Jimmy Rushing, Count Basie, Andy Gibson) – 4:27
2. "The Train and the River" (Giuffre) – 4:42
3. "Nervous" (Mal Waldron) – 3:43
4. "Dickie's Dream" (Basie, Lester Young) – 5:52
