= Riders to the Sea =

1904 play written by John Millington Synge

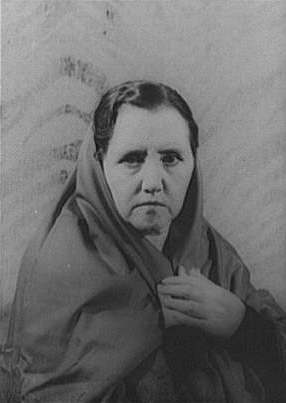
Sara Allgood as Maurya, photo taken by Carl Van Vechten, 1938

Riders to the Sea is a play written by Irish and Literary Renaissance playwright John Millington Synge. It was first performed on 25 February 1904 at the Molesworth Hall, Dublin, by the Irish National Theater Society with Helen Laird playing Maurya. A one-act tragedy, the play is set at Inishmaan in the Aran Islands, and like all of Synge's plays it is noted for capturing the poetic dialogue of rural Ireland. The plot is based not on the traditional conflict of human wills but on the hopeless struggle of a people against the impersonal but relentless cruelty of the sea.

== Background ==
In 1897, J. M. Synge was encouraged by his friend and colleague William Butler Yeats to visit the Aran Islands. He went on to spend the summers from 1898 to 1903 there. While on the Aran Island of Inishmaan, Synge heard the story of a man from Inishmaan whose body washed up on the shore of an island of County Donegal, which inspired Riders to the Sea.

Riders to the Sea is written in the Hiberno-English dialect of the Aran Islands. Synge's use of phrasing from the Irish language is part of the Irish Literary Revival, a period when Irish literature looked to encourage pride and nationalism in Ireland.

Several scenes in the play are taken from stories Synge collected during his time in the Aran Islands and recorded in his book The Aran Islands. These include the identification of the drowned man by his clothing and the account of a man's ghost being seen riding a horse.

== Principal characters ==
- Maurya: Grief-stricken widow and mother of eight children Cathleen, Nora, Bartley, Shawn, Sheamus, Stephen, Patch, and Michael.
- Cathleen: Maurya's elder daughter, tries to keep her mother from dying from grief by identifying her deceased brother Michael's clothing.
- Nora: Maurya's younger daughter, helps her sister with their mother.
- Bartley: Maurya's youngest and only living son, has died by the end of the play.
- Maurya's sons Shawn, Sheamus, Stephen, Patch, and Michael, as well as Maurya's husband are all deceased when the play begins.
- There is also a priest character who is never seen but is quoted by Cathleen and Nora in the beginning of the play.
- Eamon Simon, Stephen Pheety, and Colum Shawn are the neighbours and friends of Bartley.

== Plot synopsis ==
Maurya has lost her husband and five sons to the sea. As the play begins Nora and Cathleen receive word from the priest that a body, which may be their brother Michael's, has washed up on shore in County Donegal, on the Irish mainland north of their home island of Inishmaan. Bartley is planning to sail to Connemara to sell a horse, and ignores Maurya's pleas to stay. He leaves gracefully. Maurya predicts that by nightfall she will have no living sons, and her daughters chide her for sending Bartley off with an ill word. Maurya goes after Bartley to bless his voyage, and Nora and Cathleen receive clothing from the drowned corpse that confirms it was Michael. Maurya returns home claiming to have seen the ghost of Michael riding behind Bartley and begins lamenting the loss of the men in her family to the sea, after which some villagers bring in the corpse of Bartley. He fell off his horse into the sea and drowned.

This speech of Maurya is famous in Irish drama:

(raising her head and speaking as if she did not see the people around her) They're all gone now, and there isn't anything more the sea can do to me.... I'll have no call now to be up crying and praying when the wind breaks from the south, and you can hear the surf is in the east, and the surf is in the west, making a great stir with the two noises, and they hitting one on the other. I'll have no call now to be going down and getting Holy Water in the dark nights after Samhain, and I won't care what way the sea is when the other women will be keening. (To Nora) Give me the Holy Water, Nora; there's a small sup still on the dresser.

== Themes ==
=== Paganism ===
The pervading theme of this work is the subtle paganism Synge observed in the people of rural Ireland.

=== Tradition vs. modernity ===
Another main theme of the play is the tension between the traditional and modern worlds in Ireland at the time. While Maurya, representative of the older Irish generation, is immovably tied to the traditional world and inward-looking, Nora, representative of the younger generation is willing to change with the outside world and therefore outward-looking. Cathleen, the eldest daughter struggles to bridge these two worlds and hold both in balance.

=== Fatalism ===
The characters of the play are at all times in contact with and accepting of the reality of death, the sea and drowning especially being a constant threat. They are caught between the dual realities of the sea as a source of livelihood and a fatal threat. The objects and culture of death in the form of coffins, keening, and mourning are prevalent in the play and are closely based on Synge's observations of the culture of the Aran Island.

== Adaptations ==
=== Film ===
At least two motion picture versions of the play have been made:

- A 1935, 40-minute black-and-white film directed by Brian Desmond Hurst with screenplay adaptation by Patrick Kirwan with Sara Allgood and, notably, Synge's bereaved fiancée Marie O'Neill. Hurst had been mentored in Hollywood by John Ford, and Ruth Barton describes scenes in the film as "remarkably Fordian".
- A 1987 47-minute colour film directed and adapted by Ronan O'Leary with Geraldine Page (in her final film appearance).

=== Television ===
In July 1960, the second aired episode of The Robert Herridge Theatre was a 27-minute production of the play starring Maureen Stapleton.

=== Opera ===
The English composer Ralph Vaughan Williams (1872–1958) made an almost verbatim setting of the play as a one-act opera, using the same title (1927).

Bruce Montgomery (1927–2008) wrote a light opera, Spindrift (1963), that was based on Riders to the Sea.

German composer Eduard Pütz (1911–2000) also set the play as an opera, using the same title (1972).

American composer Marga Richter (1926–2020) also set the play as a one-act opera, using the same title (1996).

French composer Henri Rabaud (1873–1949) L’appel de la mer, a one-act opera, (1924), libretto by Rabaud based on Riders to the Sea, debut in Paris, Salle Favart, April 10, 1924

=== Dance ===
Mary Anthony's piece is titled Threnody.

=== Stage ===
Señora Carrar's Rifles is a one-act play adaptation.

DruidSynge a stage reenactment of all Synge's plays.

== Translations ==
The play has been translated in French by Georgette Sable and it has been published by Anthropomare

Other translations include: À cheval vers la mer (Riders to the Sea, 1903; 1904) translated by Maurice Bourgeois, Cavaliers à la mer, translated by Fouad El-Etr, and Cavaliers vers la mer (combined with L’Ombre de la vallée), translated by Françoise Morvan.
