= Riders to the Sea (1960 film) =

1960 television film

- Based on: Riders to the Sea by John Millington Synge
- Written by: John Millington Synge
- Directed by: Karl Genus
- Starring: Maureen Stapleton; Helena Carroll; Kathy Willard
- Composer: Tom Scott
- Country of origin: United States
- Original language: English

Production
- Producer: Robert Herridge
- Running time: 27 minutes
- Production company: CBS Films

Original release
- Network: CBC
- Release: July 18, 1960

Riders to the Sea is an American-made drama television film that premiered on the Canadian Broadcasting Corporation in July 1960, as part of The Robert Herridge Theatre. Directed by Karl Genus, it is a production of John Millington Synge's much-revived, like-named one-act drama, starring Maureen Stapleton as the widow and much bereaved mother, as well as Helena Carroll, Katherine Willard, and, as the last remaining son, Dublin native Liam Gannon.

== Cast ==
- Michael Kane as himself (Narrator)
- Maureen Stapleton as Maurya
- Helena Carroll as Kathleen
- Katherine Willard as Nora
- Liam Gannon as Bartley

== Plot ==
Maurya has lost her fisherman husband, father-in-law, and all but one of her six sons to the sea. As the play begins, her daughters Nora and Cathleen receive word that a body, suspected to be that of their brother Michael, has washed up on shore in County Donegal, on the Irish mainland north of their home island of Inishmaan. At the same time, Bartley, the last remaining son, is planning to sail to Connemara to sell a horse, and ignores Maurya's pleas to stay. Maurya predicts that by nightfall she will have no living sons, and her daughters chide her for sending Bartley off with an ill word. Maurya goes after Bartley to bless his voyage, and Nora and Cathleen receive clothing from the drowned corpse that confirms it was Michael. Maurya returns home, claiming to have seen the ghost of Michael riding behind Bartley, and begins lamenting the loss of the men in her family to the sea. Shortly thereafter, some villagers bring in the corpse of Bartley. He had fallen off his horse into the sea and drowned.

== Reception ==
The Montreal Gazette's Bernard Dube found the adaptation "starkly moving" and emblematic of the Herridge series "adding a new dimension to dramatic intensity". By contrast, Toronto Star critic Dennis Braithwaite takes issue with the play itself—finding it "ill-suited to television [and/or] simply outdated"—and laments the production's "rhetorical nature, [which] somehow struck a false note in this age of realistic, understated drama, [coming across] more as a dramatic sermon on the terrible fate of Irish fishermen at the turn of the century than as a moving and universal tragedy".

However, another Montreal critic, the Star's Pat Pearce, was even more emphatic than Dube, finding the production, rough spots notwithstanding, ultimately transporting and utterly immersive.

Robert Herridge and director Karl Genus continue to do remarkable things with the half-hour television drama, the most remarkable, perhaps, their knack of making us forget it is television drama. When Maureen Stapleton slowly faded from last night's screen we came to slowly, back to the edge of our own living room chair and away from that cottage kitchen where the tragic mother of Synge's Riders to the Sea keens her great lament for her drowned sons, 'They're all gone now, and there isn't anything more the sea can do to me...' For even though it was hard in the early stages to distinguish some of the lines, young actress Katherine Willard having some trouble with her brogue, the production grew progressively almost unbearably compelling. [...] This 'Herridge Theatre' could well be one of the most important, and most valid, contributions to the struggling art of TV in many years. It is entirely to the credit of the CBC that alone of the North American networks it recognized its worth,' and trusted its audience to want to share the experiment.
