= Mute (The Twilight Zone) =

- The Twilight Zone episode
- Episode no.: Season 4 Episode 5
- Directed by: Stuart Rosenberg
- Written by: Richard Matheson
- Production code: 4858
- Original air date: January 31, 1963

Guest appearances
- Ann Jillian (credited as Ann Jilliann); Claudia Bryar; Robert Boon; Frank Overton; Barbara Baxley; Irene Dailey; Oscar Beregi, Jr.; Percy Helton; Éva Szörényi (credited as Eva Soreny); William Challee; Bill Erwin

Episode chronology
← Previous "He's Alive"	Next → "Death Ship"
- The Twilight Zone (1959 TV series) (season 4)

"Mute" is an episode of the American television anthology series The Twilight Zone. It was written by Richard Matheson, based on his 1962 short story of the same name which appeared in the anthology The Fiend in You. The episode deals with a young girl (in the Matheson story it was a boy) raised to communicate only through telepathy, and her struggles after the sudden death of her parents forces her to enter mainstream society.

== Opening narration ==
What you're witnessing is the curtain-raiser to a most extraordinary play; to wit, the signing of a pact, the commencement of a project. The play itself will be performed almost entirely offstage. The final scenes are to be enacted a decade hence and with a different cast. The main character of these final scenes is Ilse, the daughter of Professor and Mrs. Nielsen, age two. At the moment she lies sleeping in her crib, unaware of the singular drama in which she is to be involved. Ten years from this moment, Ilse Nielsen is to know the desolating terror of living simultaneously in the world and in the Twilight Zone.

== Plot ==
Firefighters respond to a blazing fire in a family home. The fire is so extensive that they immediately write off the house as a loss, and a search of the building turns up no survivors. However, twelve-year-old Ilse Nielsen is found outside, having escaped unscathed from the blaze that killed her parents. Sheriff Harry Wheeler and his wife Cora take in Ilse until her relatives can be found. Ilse does not speak, even though medical examinations show she does not have a speech disorder. The Wheelers deduce that her parents prohibited her from talking, and they conclude it was a case of parental neglect. In actuality, Ilse's parents were part of a secret society who learned how to use what they believe are latent telepathic abilities possessed by all humans. They agreed to raise their children to communicate solely with telepathy. Ilse was two when the agreement began. The members of the society stayed in touch through the mail.

Using the return addresses from the recent society letters, which the postmaster did not allow the sheriff to open, Harry writes inquiries about Ilse's relatives. Ilse now lives in a world of people who speak with voices instead of their minds. Having been taught to communicate in pure meaning instead of words, she finds the sound of human speech alien and painful. She looks forward to being reunited with the other telepathic children after Harry finds them. But Cora, still grieving over her own long-dead daughter, does not want Ilse to leave, so she takes the letters from the mailbox and burns them to prevent Ilse from being taken away. Ilse witnesses this sabotage but, lacking the ability to speak or write, cannot tell Harry.

When weeks go by without reply to his letters, Harry enrolls Ilse in school. Her teacher is patient with her inability to speak, but firm, and daily prompts Ilse to say her name. She deduces that Ilse has telepathic abilities by the end of her first day, telling her that her father tried to also raise her to be a telepath and in the end, become a medium. Over time, her teacher is able to teach Ilse to speak instead of using her telepathic abilities.

Karl and Frau Maria Werner, society members from Austria, are alarmed by the lapse in the Nielsens' regular communications and come to check on them. After being informed of the situation, the Werners meet with Ilse and talk to her telepathically. Their telepathic speech is incomprehensible to Ilse, and after continued telepathic prodding she begins sobbing and repeatedly saying, "My name is Ilse! My name is Ilse!" The Werners realize that over her weeks in a non-telepathic society, she has lost all knowledge of how to communicate telepathically. They decide to allow the Wheelers to adopt Ilse, even though the Werners are her godparents. Though saddened by Ilse's loss of telepathy, they take comfort in telling themselves that Cora Wheeler loves Ilse more than her parents did. The Werners reveal that Ilse escaped the fire because her parents, though trapped themselves, telepathically guided their daughter from the house.The scene ends with Ilse and her new mother walking out of her new home and family.

== Closing narration ==
It has been noted in a book of proven wisdom that perfect love casteth out fear. While it's unlikely that this observation was meant to include that specific fear which follows the loss of extrasensory perception, the principle remains, as always, beautifully intact. Case in point, that of Ilse Nielsen, former resident of the Twilight Zone.

== Cast ==
- Ann Jillian as Ilse Nielsen (credited as Ann Jilliann)
- Claudia Bryar as Frau Nielsen
- Robert Boon as Holger Nielsen
- Frank Overton as Harry Wheeler
- Barbara Baxley as Cora Wheeler
- Irene Dailey as Miss Frank
- Oscar Beregi, Jr. as Professor Karl Werner
- Percy Helton as Tom Poulter
- Éva Szörényi as Frau Maria Werner (credited as Eva Soreny)
- William Challee as Man
- Bill Erwin as Man In Flashback
