= Sarah Siddons Award =

Award for Chicago theatre performance

The Sarah Siddons Award, established in 1952, is presented annually to an actor or actress for an outstanding performance in a Chicago theatrical production. The winner receives a statuette of the Welsh stage actress Sarah Siddons.

It is awarded by the Sarah Siddons Society, an American non-profit organization founded in 1952 by prominent Chicago theatre patrons with the goal of promoting excellence in the theatre.

== History ==
The Society and its award were inspired by a fictional award depicted in the opening scene of the Joseph L. Mankiewicz film All About Eve, winner of the 1950 Academy Award for Best Picture. The film opens with the image of an award trophy, described by character Addison DeWitt (George Sanders) as the "highest honour our theater knows: the Sarah Siddons Award for Distinguished Achievement." The award was invented by Mankiewicz for the script.

In 1952, a small group of eminent Chicago theater-goers, including actress Edith Luckett Davis, mother of future First Lady Nancy Davis Reagan, organized the Society and began presenting an award physically modeled and named after the one in the film.

Joseph L. Mankiewicz also received the award. His response was, reportedly, "I invented it to put down all this fatuous prize-giving, and now there's some outfit in Chicago actually promoting a Sarah Siddons Award every year, and people like Helen Hayes go out there and make tearful acceptance speeches." Earlier, he had referred to the award as "this bit of my intended satiric fantasy which has become unintended satiric reality."

During the Sarah Siddons Society Anniversary Gala in 1973, an honorary Sarah Siddons award was presented to Bette Davis, even though she didn't appear in a Chicago play that year. Another All About Eve cast member, Celeste Holm, had previously won the award. Lauren Bacall, who played Davis' role in the Broadway musical version, Applause, has also won.

=== Scholarships ===
In addition to the award, the Society also funds a number of scholarships for theatre and other performance university students in the Chicago area. Beginning in 2013, the Society has partnered with the Chicago Humanities Festival to expose young students from disadvantaged backgrounds to live performances.

== Award winners ==
Actress/Actor of the Year:

- 1953 – Helen Hayes (also 1969)
- 1954 – Beatrice Lillie
- 1955 – Deborah Kerr
- 1956 – Nancy Kelly (also 1964)
- 1957 – Shirley Booth
- 1958 – Anne Rogers
- 1959 – Ruth Roman
- 1960 – Geraldine Page
- 1961 – Gertrude Berg
- 1962 – Florence Henderson
- 1963 – Julia Meade
- 1964 – Nancy Kelly (also 1956)
- 1965 – Myrna Loy
- 1966 – Carol Channing
- 1967 – Eve Arden
- 1968 – Celeste Holm
- 1969 – Helen Hayes (also 1953)
- 1970 – Barbara Rush
- 1971 – Irene Dailey
- 1972 – Lauren Bacall (also 1984)
- 1973 – Bette Davis
- 1973 – Sada Thompson (also 1988)
- 1974 – Colleen Dewhurst
- 1975 – Angela Lansbury (also 1981)
- 1976 – Julie Harris
- 1977 – Lynn Redgrave (also 1995)
- 1978 – Cloris Leachman
- 1979 – Jessica Tandy
- 1980 – Claudette Colbert
- 1981 – Angela Lansbury (also 1975)
- 1982 – Dorothy Loudon
- 1983 – Ann Miller
- 1984 – Lauren Bacall (also 1972)
- 1985 – Rita Moreno
- 1986 – Lucie Arnaz
- 1987 – Liza Minnelli
- 1988 – Sada Thompson (also 1973)
- 1989 – Lily Tomlin
- 1990 – Ellen Burstyn
- 1991 – Loretta Swit
- 1992 – Hollis Resnik
- 1993 – Stefanie Powers
- 1994 – Bernadette Peters
- 1995 – Lynn Redgrave (also 1977)
- 1996 – Julie Andrews
- 1997 – Faye Dunaway
- 1999 – Brian Dennehy
- 2000 – Heather Headley
- 2002 – Chita Rivera
- 2004 – Elaine Stritch
- 2006 – John Mahoney
- 2008 – Kathleen Turner
- 2009 – William Petersen
- 2010 – Patti LuPone
- 2011 – John O'Hurley
- 2012 – Barbara Cook
- 2013 – Audra McDonald
- 2014 – Bebe Neuwirth
- 2015 – Jessie Mueller
- 2016 – Sutton Foster, Brian d'Arcy James
- 2017 – Kate Baldwin, Kate Shindle
- 2018 - Betty Buckley
- 2019 - Tracy Letts
- 2020 - Brian Stokes Mitchell
- 2021 - André De Shields
- 2022 - Sandy Duncan
- 2023 - Stephanie J. Block
- 2024 - Kelli O’Hara
