= Barbara Rush =

American actress (1927–2024)

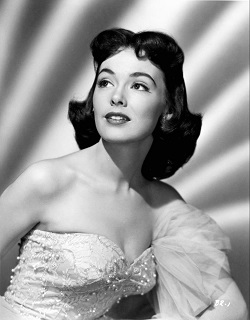
- Rush in 1954
- Born: January 4, 1927; Denver, Colorado, U.S.
- Died: March 31, 2024 (aged 97); Westlake Village, California, U.S.
- Education: University of California, Santa Barbara (1948)
- Occupation: Actress
- Years active: 1950–2007, 2017
- Spouses: Jeffrey Hunter (m. 1950; div. 1955) Warren Cowan (m. 1959; div. 1969) Jim Gruzalski (m. 1970; div. 1973)
- Children: 2, including Claudia
- Relatives: Carolyn Hennesy (niece)
- Awards: 1954 Golden Globe Award for Most Promising Newcomer – Female; 1970 Sarah Siddons Award

Barbara Rush (January 4, 1927 – March 31, 2024) was an American actress of stage, screen, and television. In 1954, she won the Golden Globe Award for most promising female newcomer for her role in the 1953 American science-fiction film It Came from Outer Space. Later in her career, Rush became a regular performer in the television series Peyton Place, and appeared in TV movies, miniseries, and a variety of other programs, including the soap opera All My Children and the family drama 7th Heaven, as well as starring in films such as The Young Philadelphians, The Young Lions, Robin and the 7 Hoods, and Hombre.

== Early life and education ==
Rush was born in Denver on January 4, 1927. Her parents were Roy and Marguerite Rush. Her father was a lawyer for a Midwest mining company. She grew up in Santa Barbara, California. Rush attended the University of California, Santa Barbara and graduated in 1948, starting her career in the university's theatre program. After graduating from UCSB, she moved to Los Angeles. She lived at the Hollywood Studio Club, a hostel for young women working in the film industry. She also took acting classes at the accredited Pasadena Playhouse School for Performing Arts, also known as the Pasadena Playhouse College of Theatre Arts. Just two years after graduating from UCSB, Rush was contracted to do her first feature-length film, The Goldbergs, in 1950.

== Career ==
Rush's career began on the stage in the 1940s and quickly expanded to film and TV. She performed on stage at the Lobero Theatre and the Pasadena Playhouse before signing with Paramount Pictures. She made her screen debut in the 1950 movie, The Goldbergs. In 1951, she co-starred in the classic George Pal sci-fi film When Worlds Collide. In 1952, she starred in Flaming Feather with Sterling Hayden and Victor Jory. In 1953, she starred in the sci-fi thriller It Came From Outer Space, for which she won the 1954 Golden Globe Award for "Most Promising Newcomer – Female" for her performance.

In the acclaimed 1956 drama, Bigger Than Life, Rush played the role of Lou Avery, the wife of James Mason's character, Ed Avery, a teacher who has a chronic inflammatory disease that is incurable. He uses cortisone for symptom relief but then begins to abuse the medication, putting his family in peril. In the 1958 film The Young Lions, she played the love interest of reluctant soldier Dean Martin, and the following year she was cast in the 1959 movie The Young Philadelphians as the on-again, off-again, hot-cold girlfriend of ambitious lawyer Paul Newman.

Rush's characters were often those of willful women of means or as polished, high-society doyenne. She was occasionally cast as a villainess or femme fatale, such as Marian Stevens in the Rat Pack's 1964 gangster musical Robin and the 7 Hoods. Marian either seduces or attempts to seduce five different men to control the Chicago mobs from behind the scenes. In the 1967 Western drama Hombre, working with Paul Newman again, she played Audra Favor, the rich, younger, and condescending wife of a thief – and ends up being taken hostage and tied to a stake.

Rush began working in television in the 1960s. In 1964, she was billed as "Special Guest Star" for the episode, "The Form of Things Unknown", in the popular 1960s sci-fi series on ABC, The Outer Limits (1963–1965). She portrayed the devious Nora Clavicle in the popular TV series Batman (1966–1968). Rush soon became a regular in TV movies, miniseries, and dramas such as Peyton Place and the daytime soap opera All My Children.

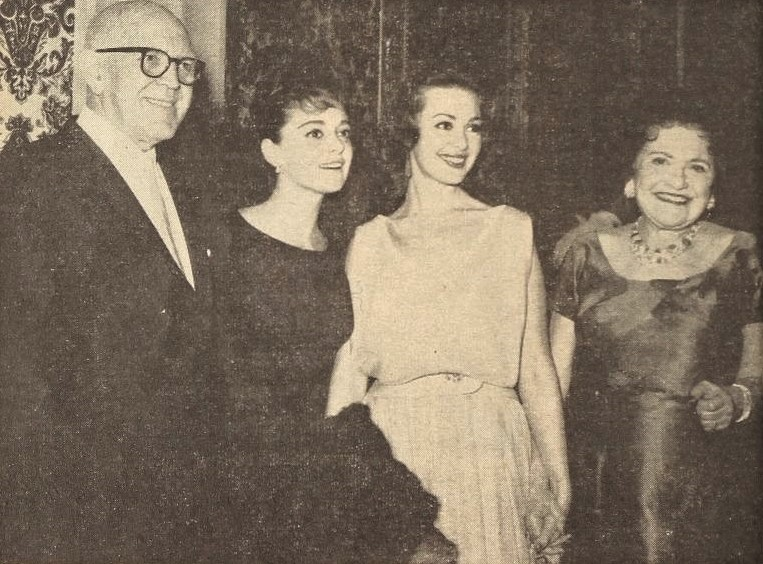
(L-R): Jimmy McHugh, Anna Maria Alberghetti, Barbara Rush and Louella Parsons from Modern Screen, 1960

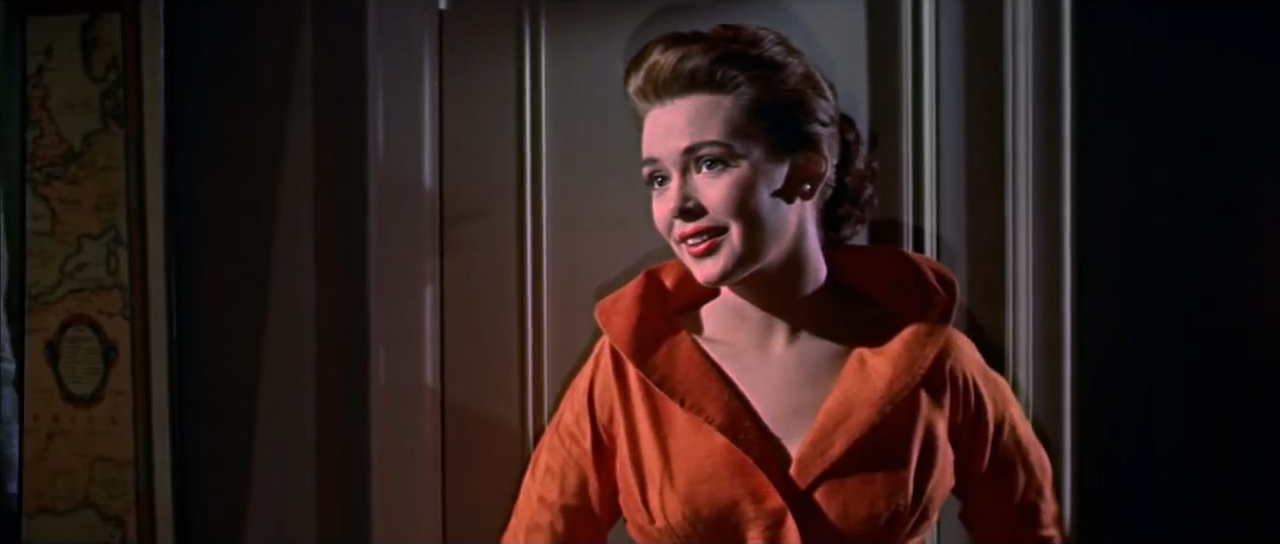
Screenshot of Barbara Rush from the trailer for Bigger Than Life (1956)

Rush began her career on stage, which remained a part of her professional life until she retired. In 1970, she earned the Sarah Siddons Award (Chicago Actress Of The Year) for dramatic achievement in Chicago theatre for her leading role in Forty Carats.

In 1976, Rush played the role of Ann Sommers/Chris Stewart, the mother of female sci-fi action character Jaime Sommers in The Bionic Woman. In 1979, Rush played Eleonor, the love interest of captain Stubing in a double episode of The Love Boat

After appearing in the 1980 disco-themed film, Can't Stop the Music, Rush returned to television. She was cast as Eudora Weldon in the early 1980s soap opera, Flamingo Road. In 1983 and 1984 she played widow Elizabeth Knight in the two-part episode "Goliath” in the Knight Rider series. (Part 1 aired 10/2/1983; Part 2 aired 2/19/1984.)

In 1984 Rush returned to the theatre and brought her one-woman play, A Woman of Independent Means, to Broadway in New York City. In 1989 she toured with the national company of Steel Magnolias as the character M'Lynn.

A native of Denver, Colorado, Rush appeared twice at the historic Elitch Theatre. In 1982 she played Ellen in The Supporting Cast and in 1987 she brought her one-woman play, A Woman of Independent Means to the theatre.

During the 1990s and up to 2007 Rush continued to make guest appearances on television. In 1998, she was featured in the episode, "Balance of Nature", in the series reboot of The Outer Limits on Showtime (1995–2002). Rush was one of five actors who appeared in both the original series and the reboot, and the only actress to do so. In 2007, Rush played the recurring role of Grandma Ruth Camden in the long-running and very popular series 7th Heaven (1996–2007). After the series ended in 2007, it appears that she "retired" from TV and films and focused her energy on her first love – the stage. She occasionally appeared on stage at the Theatre Guild in Orange County, CA in the mid-2000s. She made her final film appearance in 2017 in a "horror short" titled Bleeding Hearts: The Arteries of Glenda Bryant. She starred alongside her niece, actress Carolyn Hennesy.

== Personal life and death ==
Rush married actor Jeffrey Hunter in 1950; they divorced in 1955. She married publicist Warren Cowan in 1959 but divorced in 1969. Rush married sculptor Jim Gruzalski in 1970 after they met at an Engelbert Humperdinck concert. They divorced in 1973.

Rush had two children including daughter Claudia Cowan, a journalist with Fox News. Rush was also the aunt of actress Carolyn Hennesy.

Since 1997 Rush had lived in the Harold Lloyd Estate in Beverly Hills, California, and was a neighbor of David Geffen. Her final residence was a care home in Westlake Village, California. Rush died there on March 31, 2024, at the age of 97, due to complications from dementia.

== Acting credits ==
=== Filmography ===
Year	Title	Role	Notes
1950	The Goldbergs	Debby Sherman	
1951	Quebec	Madelon	
1951	The First Legion	Terry Gilmartin	
1951	When Worlds Collide	Joyce Hendron	
1952	Flaming Feather	Nora Logan	
1953	Prince of Pirates	Countess Nita Orde	
1953	It Came from Outer Space	Ellen Fields	
1954	Taza, Son of Cochise	Oona	
1954	Magnificent Obsession	Joyce Phillips	
1954	The Black Shield of Falworth	Meg	
1955	Captain Lightfoot	Aga Doherty	
1955	Medal of Honor	Herself	Short subject
1955	Kiss of Fire	Princess Lucia	
1956	World in My Corner	Dorothy Mallinson	
1956	Bigger Than Life	Lou Avery	
1956	Flight to Hong Kong	Pamela Vincent	
1957	Oh Men! Oh Women!	Myra Hagerman	
1957	No Down Payment	Betty Kreitzer	
1958	The Young Lions	Margaret Freemantle	
1958	Harry Black and the Tiger	Christian Tanner	
1959	The Young Philadelphians	Joan Dickinson	
1960	The Bramble Bush	Margaret "Mar" McFie	
1960	Strangers When We Meet	Eve Coe	
1963	Come Blow Your Horn	Connie	
1964	Robin and the 7 Hoods	Marian	
1967	Hombre	Audra Favor	
1969	Strategy of Terror	Karen Lownes	
1972	The Man	Kay Eaton	
1973	Peege	Mom	Short
1973	Superdad	Sue McCready	
1980	Can't Stop the Music	Norma White	
1982	Summer Lovers	Jean Featherstone	
2006	My Mother's Hairdo	Fate	Short
2017	Bleeding Hearts: The Arteries of Glenda Bryant	Barbara Irons	Short; Co-starred with niece Carolyn Hennesy

=== Television films ===
Year	Title	Role
1962	Dateline: San Francisco	
1964	The Unknown	Leonora Edmond
1966	The Jet Set	
1971	Suddenly Single	Evelyn Baxter
1972	Cutter	Linda
1972	The Eyes of Charles Sand	Katharine Winslow
1972	Moon of the Wolf	Louise Rodanthe
1973	Crime Club	Denise London
1974	Fools, Females and Fun	Karen Markham
1975	The Last Day	Betty Spence
1979	Death Car on the Freeway	Rosemary
1983	The Night the Bridge Fell Down	Elaine Howard
1984	At Your Service	Barbara Stonehill
1990	Web of Deceit	Judith
1996	Widow's Kiss	Edith Fitzpatrick

=== Theatre ===
- The Golden Ball (1937) stage debut
- Personal Appearance (1948) Lobero Theatre
- The Little Foxes (1948, 1975) UC Santa Barbara
- Antony and Cleopatra (1950) Pasadena Playhouse
- Summer Stock (1951) with Anthony Perkins
- The Madwoman of Chaillot (1951) with Jeffrey Hunter
- The Voice of the Turtle (1953), with Jeffrey Hunter
- Always April (1969)
- Forty Carats (1969–1971, 1972) national tour
- The Fourposter (1971)
- The Unsinkable Molly Brown (1972)
- Butterflies Are Free (1972, 1981)
- Private Lives (1973) national tour with Louis Jourdan
- Father's Day (1974) national tour with Carole Cook
- Finishing Touches (1974, 1978)
- Hay Fever (1975, 1980)
- Kennedy's Children (1975, 1976)
- Endangered Species (1976)
- Same Time, Next Year (1976–1978) national tour
- The Night of the Iguana (1978)
- Twigs (1980)
- The Supporting Cast (1982) national tour with Carole Cook and Sandy Dennis
- Blithe Spirit (1982–1983)
- Disabled Genius (1983)
- Woman of Independent Means (1983–1988) Broadway and national tour
- Steel Magnolias (1988–1989) national tour with Carole Cook, June Lockhart, and Marion Ross
- Love Letters (1990–1993)
- The Vagina Monologues (1995–1997)
- A Delicate Balance (1993)
- The Golden Age (1997)
- Make Me a Place at Forest Lawn (2002–2007)

=== Television ===
- Lux Video Theatre (1954–1956, 4 episodes) as Cathy / Ruth / Charlotte / Joyce Gavin
- Playhouse 90 (1957–1960, 2 episodes) as Liz / Clara
- The Eleventh Hour (1962, 1 episode) as Linda Kincaid
- Saints and Sinners (1962–1963, 4 episodes) as Lizzie Hogan
- The Outer Limits (1964, 1 episode: "The Forms of Things Unknown") as Leonora Edmond
- Dr. Kildare (1965, 2 episodes) as Madge Bannion
- The Fugitive (1965, 2 episodes) as Marie Lindsey Gerard
- Custer (1967, 1 episode) as Brigid O'Rourke
- Batman (1968, 2 episodes) as Nora Clavicle
- Peyton Place (1968–1969, 75 episodes) as Marsha Russell
- Mannix (1968–1975, 2 episodes) as Rebekah Bigelow / Celia Bell
- Marcus Welby, M.D. (1969–1972, 2 episodes) as Dorothy Carpenter / Nadine Cabot
- Medical Center (1969–1974, 4 episodes) as Claire / Pauline / Judy / Nora Caldwell
- Love, American Style (1970, 1 episode) as Carol (segment "Love and the Motel")
- The Mod Squad (1971, 1 episode) as Mrs. Hamilton
- Ironside (1971–1972, 2 episodes) as Lorraine Simms / Mme. Jabez
- Night Gallery (1971, 1 episode) as Agatha Howard (segment "Cool Air")
- Maude (1972, 1 episode) as Phyllis 'Bunny' Nash
- The Streets of San Francisco (1973, 1 episode) as Anna Slovatzka Marshall
- The New Dick Van Dyke Show (1973–1974, 3 episodes) as Margot Brighton
- Cannon (1975, episode "Lady on the Run") as Linda Merrick
- The Bionic Woman (1976, 1 episode) as Ann Sommers / Chris Stuart
- The Eddie Capra Mysteries (1978, 1 episode)
- Fantasy Island (1978–1984, 3 episodes) as Mildred Koster / Kathy Moreau / Professor Smith-Myles
- The Love Boat (1979, 2 episodes) as Eleanor Gardner
- The Seekers (1979 miniseries) as Peggy Kent
- Flamingo Road (1980–1982, 38 episodes) as Eudora Weldon
- Knight Rider (1983, Part 1 of "Goliath";1984, Part 2 of "Goliath") as Elizabeth Knight
- Magnum, P.I. (1984–1987, 2 episodes) as Phoebe Sullivan / Ann Carrington
- Murder, She Wrote (1987, 1 episode) as Eva Taylor
- Hearts Are Wild (1992, 1 episode) as Caroline Thorpe
- All My Children (1992–1994, 35 episodes recurring) as Nola Orsini
- Burke's Law (1995, 1 episode) as Judge Marian Darrow
- 7th Heaven (1997–2007, 10 episodes) as Ruth Camden
- The Outer Limits (1998, 1 episode) as Barbara Matheson

Awards
Preceded by Helen Hayes	Sarah Siddons Award - Sarah Siddons Society, Chicago; 1970	Succeeded by Irene Dailey
