= The Dark at the Top of the Stairs =

Play by William Inge

The Dark at the Top of the Stairs is a 1957 play by William Inge about family conflicts during the early 1920s in a small Oklahoma town. It was nominated for the Tony Award for Best Play in 1958 and was made into a film of the same name in 1960. It is the most autobiographical of all Inge plays.

== Plot ==
The drama centers on Cora Flood, the wife of traveling salesman Rubin Flood. After she learns that her husband might be having a romantic relationship with another woman, she plans to leave the marriage and move in with her sister. Meanwhile, their shy daughter prepares for her first dance and their pre-teen son takes refuge from bullies in a scrapbook of movie stars. Rubin, who has lost his job, returns, and Cora must decide whether to stand by her man.

== Play ==
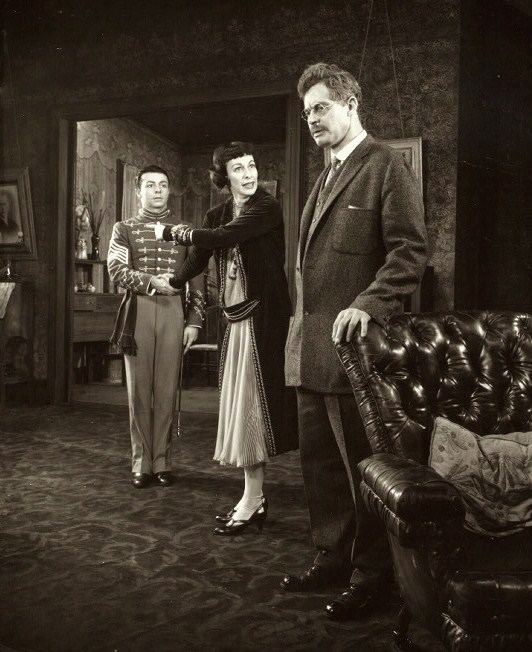
L. to R.: Timmy Everett, Eileen Heckart and Frank Overton in a scene from the stage production The Dark at the Top of the Stairs

Directed by Elia Kazan, the play opened December 5, 1957 at New York's Music Box Theatre and ran for a total of 468 performances, closing on January 17, 1959. The drama was reworked by Inge from his earlier play Farther Off from Heaven, first staged in 1947 at Margo Jones' Theatre '47 in Dallas, Texas.

Opening night cast:

- Eileen Heckart as Lottie Lacey
- Pat Hingle as Rubin Flood
- Teresa Wright as Cora Flood
- Timmy Everett as Sammy Goldenbaum
- Frank Overton as Morris Lacey
- Anthony Ray as Chauffeur
- Evans Evans as Flirt Conroy
- Carl Reindel as Punky Givens
- Judith Robinson as Reenie Flood
- Charles Saari as Sonny Flood
- Jonathan Shawn as Boy Offstage

It was nominated for five Tony Awards: Best Play, Best Featured Actor (Pat Hingle), Best Featured Actress (Eileen Heckart), Best Scenic Design (Ben Edwards), Best Director (Elia Kazan). Timmy Everett won a Theatre World Award. It was adapted into a film by the same name in 1960, directed by Delbert Mann, and starring Dorothy McGuire and Robert Preston.

== Awards and nominations ==
=== Original Broadway production ===
Year	Award	Category	Nominee	Result
1958	Tony Award	Best Play		Nominated
1958	Tony Award	Best Featured Actor in a Play	Pat Hingle	Nominated
1958	Tony Award	Best Featured Actress in a Play	Eileen Heckart	Nominated
1958	Tony Award	Best Director	Elia Kazan	Nominated
1958	Tony Award	Best Scenic Design	Ben Edwards	Nominated
1958	Theatre World Award		Timmy Everett	Won

== See also ==
- List of American films of 1960
