= The Seven Lively Arts =

American TV anthology series (1957–1958)

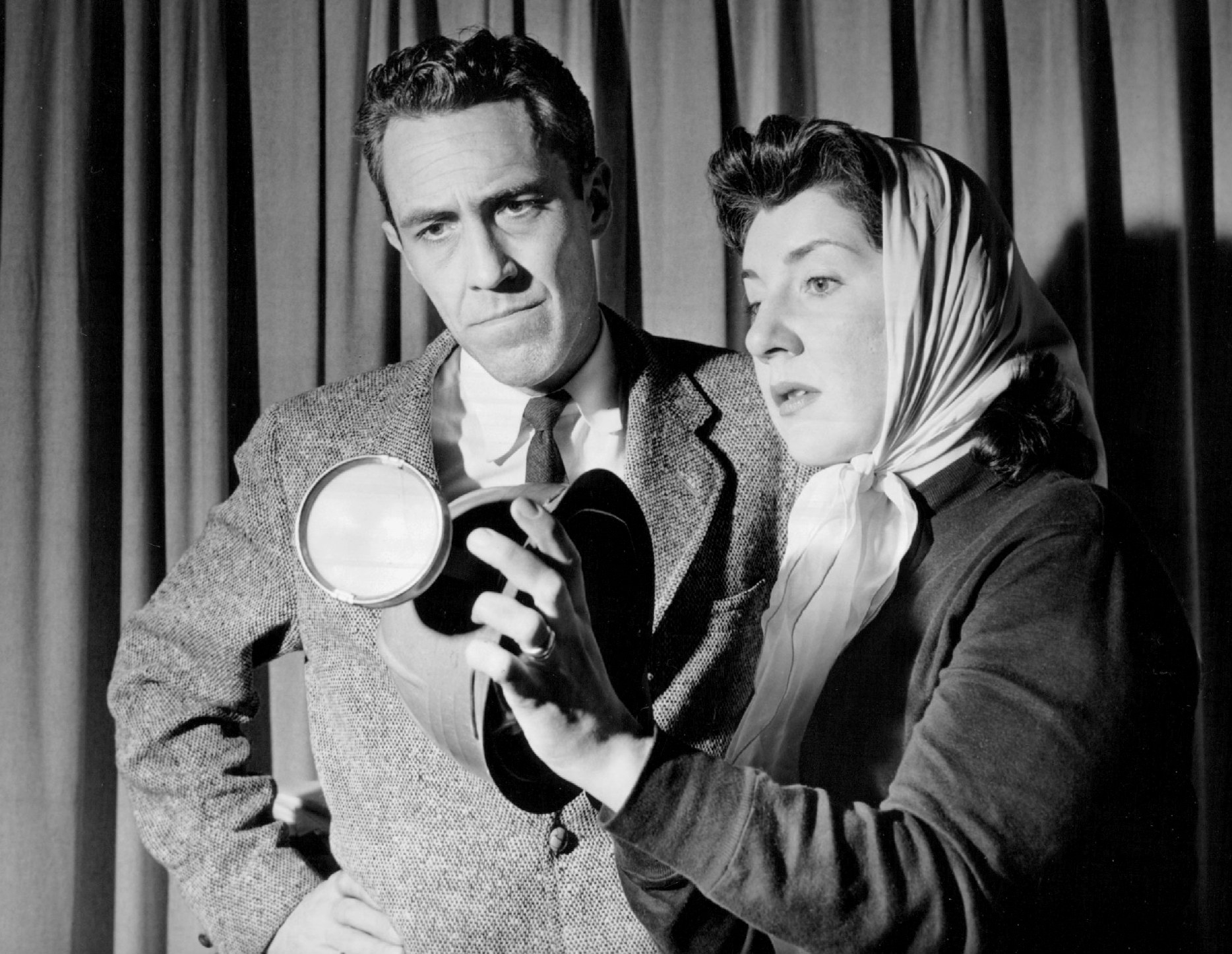
- Jason Robards and Maureen Stapleton in "Blast at Centralia #5"
- Genre: Anthology
- Directed by: Mel Ferrer; George Roy Hill; Sidney Lumet; Norm Nowicki
- Presented by: John Crosby
- Country of origin: United States
- Original language: English

Production
- Camera setup: Single-camera
- Running time: 44 mins.
- Production company: CBS

Original release
- Network: CBS
- Release: November 3, 1957

The Seven Lively Arts is an American anthology series that aired on Sunday afternoons on CBS television from November 3, 1957, until February 16, 1958. The series was executive produced by John Houseman, and hosted by New York Herald Tribune critic John Crosby. Alfredo Antonini served as the musical director for several episodes. The title was taken from the influential book of the same name written by the cultural critic Gilbert Seldes, in which he argued that the low arts (comics, vaudeville) deserved as much critical attention as the high arts (opera, literature). The eleven programs produced were—not in order:

- "The Revivalists" – a profile of contemporary evangelism
- "Hollywood around the World" – a profile of overseas film productions directed by Mel Ferrer
- "The Blast in Centralia #5" – about a 1947 mine blast in Centralia, Illinois
- "Here is New York" – an essay about the city written by E. B. White and narrated by E. G. Marshall.
- "A Few Folks And Their Songs" – a program on folk music, hosted by Theodore Bikel
- "The Nutcracker" – the first television production of Tchaikovsky's ballet (heavily abridged)
- "The World of Nick Adams" – an adaptation combining five early Ernest Hemingway stories
- "Profile of a Composer" – a profile of American composer and choralist Norman Dello Joio
- "Gold Rush" – a ballet choreographed by Agnes de Mille
- "The Sound of Jazz" – The top jazz musicians of the day performing live.
- "The Changing Ways of Love" – the opening program, starring Piper Laurie and Jason Robards, written by S.J. Perelman

== Critical response ==
In a review in the periodical Film and TV Music Thomas Talbert praised the episode "The Sound of Jazz", writing that it had an element that had been "lacking in TV music presentation". Talbert called the episode "Truly a brilliant program, artistically photographed without stiffness and easily the best that television has offered on modern music."
