= Phyllis Hill =

American actress

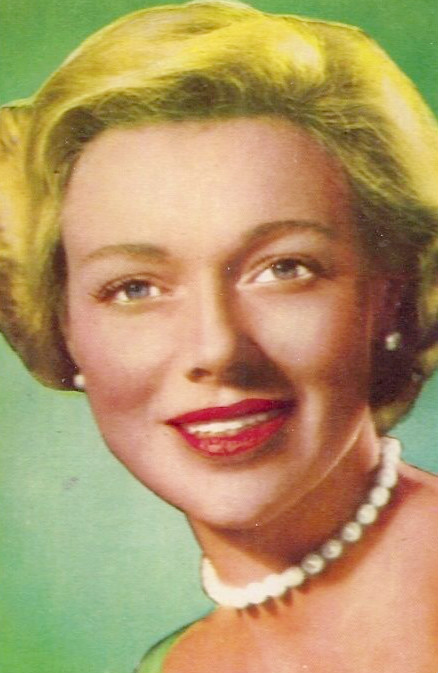
- Phyllis Hill in 1953
- Born: October 27, 1920; New York, New York, U.S.
- Died: January 1, 1993 (aged 72); Los Angeles, California, U.S.
- Occupations: Dancer; Actress
- Years active: 1948-1975
- Spouses: José Ferrer (m. 1948; div. 1953) Frank Overton (m. 1962; died 1967)

Phyllis Hill (October 27, 1920 – January 1, 1993) was an American dancer and actress.

== Early years ==
Hill was born in New York City. Her mother was actress Peggy Johnson Hill. Her sister, Joyce Hill Rainier, danced with the Monte Carlo Ballets Russes.

Hill began her career in the late 1940s, appearing on stage and in small television roles in New York.

== Stage ==
Her theatrical debut came "as one of George Balanchine's 'Baby Ballerinas' in New York." Her Broadway credits include Rosalinda, Cyrano de Bergerac, The Fifth Season, The Alchemist (1947), Angel Street (1947), Volpone (1947), Helen Goes to Troy (1943), What's Up? (1943) and Sons and Soldiers (1942).

She also appeared with the Metropolitan Opera Company ballet as well as Radio City Music Hall's Ballet Corps.

== Television ==
Hill portrayed Poco Thurman in the NBC drama Three Steps to Heaven, Mrs. Allison in the NBC serial Morning Star, and Agnes Adams in the ABC comedy That Girl.

Among Hill's television appearances were three Dr. Kildare shows during the 1964–1965 season. She appeared in three Perry Mason episodes during the final three years of the series, including the title role of Katherine Stewart in "The Case of the Wednesday Woman", and Rachel Gordon in "The Case of the Sleepy Slayer" (both in 1964). She made four appearances on The F.B.I. (1966–70).

== Marriages ==
She was married twice, both times to actors and both unions were childless:

- José Ferrer (June 19, 1948 – July 7, 1953; divorced)
- Frank Overton (1962 – 24 April 1967; his death)

== Death ==
Hill died from lung cancer in Los Angeles on New Year's Day 1993, aged 72. She was survived by a niece.

== Filmography ==
Year	Title	Role	Notes
1948	Joan of Arc	Court Lady	Uncredited
1949	Whirlpool	Party Guest	Uncredited
1950	Crisis	Barmaid	Uncredited
1956	Singing in the Dark	Ruth	
1969	Pendulum	Mrs. Wilma Elliot	
