= Frank Overton =

American actor (1918–1967)

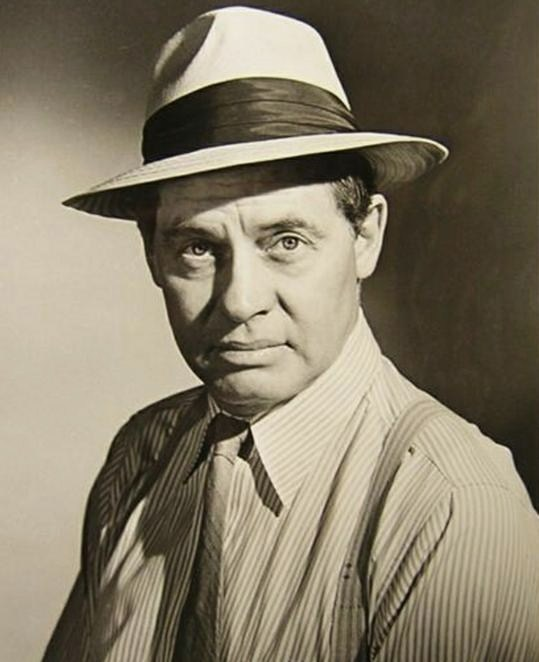
- Overton (1960s)
- Born: Frank Emmons Overton; March 12, 1918; Babylon, New York, U.S.
- Died: April 24, 1967 (aged 49); Pacific Palisades, California, U.S.
- Occupation: Actor
- Spouses: Olga Knotek (m. 1946; div. 1952); Phyllis Hill (m. 1962)
- Children: 1

Frank Emmons Overton (March 12, 1918 – April 24, 1967) was an American actor. He was best known for the roles of Major Harvey Stovall in 12 O'Clock High (1964–1967), Sheriff Heck Tate in To Kill a Mockingbird (1962), and General Bogan in Fail Safe (1964).

== Early life ==
Overton was born in Babylon, New York on March 12, 1918.

== Career ==
Overton's acting career began on the stage in New York City. His Broadway credits include The Desperate Hours (1954), The Trip to Bountiful (1953), Truckline Cafe (1945), and Jacobowsky and the Colonel (1943).

Overton appeared in numerous television programs during the early 1950s and through the late 1960s. In 1959, he appeared in an episode of The Twilight Zone with Gig Young, called "Walking Distance". Overton also appeared in the episode titled "Mute" as Sheriff Harry Wheeler with Ann Jillian. He played the father of Joe's terminally ill fiancee (Brooke Hayward) in Bonanza Season 3 Episode 19 "The Storm". Other TV work included The Fugitive in 1963.

He played Sheriff Heck Tate in the 1962 film To Kill a Mockingbird. In 1964, he played General Bogan in the film Fail Safe.

Overton appeared in an episode of the 1961 ABC series The Asphalt Jungle. He made two guest appearances on the CBS courtroom drama series Perry Mason in diverse roles. In 1961, he played a priest, Father Paul, in "The Case of the Renegade Refugee", and in 1963 he played Deputy D.A. Nelson Taylor in "The Case of the Bluffing Blast". Overton played Major Harvey Stovall in the TV series 12 O'Clock High.

Overton also played a significant role in the movie Wild River, where he appeared as the jilted fiancé of Lee Remick.

One of his last TV roles was that of Elias Sandoval in Star Trek's "This Side of Paradise", which originally aired in March 1967, just one month before his death at age 49.

== Personal life and death ==
In 1962, Overton married actress Phyllis Hill in Los Angeles.

Overton died after a heart attack in 1967 in Pacific Palisades, California. He was survived by his wife and a daughter.

== Filmography ==
Film
Title	Year	Role	Notes
Boomerang	1947	Man in Mob Behind Jail	Uncredited
Mystery Street	1950	Guard	Uncredited
No Way Out	1950	Intern	Uncredited
The True Story of Jesse James	1957	Major Rufus Cobb	
Lonelyhearts	1958	Mr. Sargeant	
Desire Under the Elms	1958	Simeon Cabot	
The Last Mile	1959	Father O'Connors	
Wild River	1960	Walter Clark	
The Dark at the Top of the Stairs	1960	Morris Lacey	
Posse from Hell	1961	Burt Hogan	
Claudelle Inglish	1961	Harley Peasley	
To Kill a Mockingbird	1962	Sheriff Heck Tate	
Fail Safe	1964	General Bogan	
Television
Title	Year	Role	Notes
Studio One	1951–1957	(1) John Emroy (2) Samuel Stone (3) Ben Raisman (4) Alan Wall (5) Mr. McGinnis (8) Dr. Manning	(1) Season 4 Episode 9: "A Bolt of Lightning" (1951) (2) Season 4 Episode 37: "Abraham Lincoln" (1952) (3) Season 5 Episode 4: "Little Man, Big World" (1952) (4) Season 5 Episode 8: "Plan for Escape" (1952) (5) Season 6 Episode 17: "The Remarkable Incident at Carson Corners" (1954) (6) Season 7 Episode 5: "The Boy Who Changed the World" (1954) (7) Season 9 Episode 8: "Portrait of a Citizen" (1956) (8) Season 10 Episode 6: "Act of Mercy" (1957)
Lux Video Theatre	1952	Prefect	Season 3 Episode 17: "A Child is Born"
The Trip to Bountiful	1953	Sheriff	TV movie
The Philco Television Playhouse	1953–1955	(1) Sheriff (2) Mr. Davis (4) Harris Rhodes (5) Pat Garrett	(1) Season 5 Episode 16: "The Trip to Bountiful" (1953) (2) Season 6 Episode 12: "The Dancers" (1954) (3) Season 7 Episode 9: "Walk into the Night" (1955) (4) Season 7 Episode 11: "A Sense of Justice" (1955) (5) Season 7 Episode 23: "The Death of Billy the Kid" (1955)
Armstrong Circle Theatre	1954–1959	(1) Frank (2) Major Collins (3) Mr. Arnquist (4) Sam Starr (5) Dr. Bergman	(1) Season 5 Episode 4: "Explosion" (1954) (2) Season 5 Episode 34: "Crisis" (1954) (3) Season 6 Episode 14: "A Baby Named X" (1956) (4) Season 7 Episode 7: "Divorcees Anonymous" (1957) (5) Season 9 Episode 15: "Prescription-Hypnosis" (1959)
The United States Steel Hour	1954–1963	(1) (2) Al Durfee (3) Steve (4) Mr. Thornton (5) Matt Preston (6) George Crozier	(1) Season 1 Episode 18: "Fearful Decision" (1954) (2) Season 2 Episode 18: "Fearful Decision" (Repeat episode from first season) (1955) (3) Season 3 Episode 22: "Noon on Doomsday" (1956) (4) Season 4 Episode 10: "To Die Alone" (1957) (5) Season 5 Episode 2: "Haunted Harbor" (1957) (6) Season 10 Episode 15: "The Secrets of Stella Crozier" (1963)
The Alcoa Hour	1956	(1) Barton Steinbach (2) Tyler	(1) Season 1 Episode 14: "Even the Weariest River" (2) Season 2 Episode 26: "No License to Kill: Part II"
Decoy	1957	Bergen	Season 1 Episode 4: "To Trap a Thief"
The Twilight Zone	1959–1963	(1) Robert Sloan (2) Harry Wheeler	(1) Season 1 Episode 5: "Walking Distance" (1959) (2) Season 4 Episode 5: "Mute" (1963)
Thriller	1960	Bart Hattering	Season 1 Episode 2: "Child's Play"
Alcoa Presents: One Step Beyond	1960	Calvin Gannis	Season 2 Episode 16: "The Justice Tree"
Peter Gunn	1960	Henry Lockwood	Season 2 Episode 35: "Letter of the Law"
Naked City	1960	Andrew Bates	Season 2 Episode 3: "A Succession of Heartbeats"
Adventures in Paradise	1960	Max Brodie	Season 1 Episode 17: "Judith"
Route 66	1960–1963	(1) Hanson (2) Cord Webster (3) Peter Graham (4) Andy Ferguson	(1) Season 1 Episode 4: "The Man on the Monkey Board" (1960) (2) Season 1 Episode 13: "The Quick and the Dead" (1961) (3) Season 3 Episode 13: "Where Is Chick Lorimer, Where Has She Gone?" (1962) (4) Season 3 Episode 31: "Soda Pop and Paper Flags" (1963)
Perry Mason	1961–1963	(1) Father Paul (2) Deputy District Attorney Nelson Taylor	(1) Season 5 Episode 13: "The Case of the Renegade Refugee" (1961) (2) Season 6 Episode 14: "The Case of the Bluffing Blast" (1963)
The Defenders	1961–1965	(1) (2) District Attorney Bill Bryan (3) William Bryan (4) District Attorney (5) Malcolm Page (6) Richard Holmes	(1) Season 1 Episode 7: "The Hundred Lives of Harry Simms" (1961) (2) Season 1 Episode 14: "The Prowler" (1961) (3) Season 2 Episode 10: "The Invisible Badge" (1962) (4) Season 2 Episode 11: "The Hidden Jungle" (1962) (5) Season 3 Episode 28: "Yankee Come Home" (1964) (6) Season 4 Episode 28: "The Prosecutor" (1965)
The Eleventh Hour	1962	Pete Harvey	Season 1 Episode 3: "Make Me a Place"
Checkmate	1962	Martin Brack	Season 2 Episode 22: "Brooding Fixation"
Sam Benedict	1962	Roger Colby	Season 1 Episode 15: "Where There's a Will"
Laramie	1962–1963	(1) Jason Duncan (2) James Courtland	(1) Season 3 Episode 19: "The High Country" (1962) (2) Season 4 Episode 27: "The Last Battleground" (1963)
Wagon Train	1962–1963	(1) Martin Jennings (2) Doctor	(1) Season 5 Episode 19: "The Lonnie Fallon Story" (1962) (2) Season 7 Episode 13: "The Story of Cain" (1963)
Bonanza	1962–1967	(1) Captain Matthew White (2) Amos Crenshaw	(1) Season 3 Episode 19: "The Storm" (1962) (2) Season 8 Episode 31: "The Wormwood Cup" (1967)
The Virginian	1962–1967	(1) Sam Cafferty (2) Mr. Umber (3) Sam Atkins	(1) Season 1 Episode 12: "50 Days to Moose Jaw" (1962) (2) Season 2 Episode 22: "Smile of a Dragon" (1964) (3) Season 5 Episode 26: "A Welcoming Town" (1967)
The Alfred Hitchcock Hour	1963	George Felse	Season 1 Episode 27: "Death and the Joyful Woman"
The Fugitive	1963	Sheriff Al Springer	Season 1 Episode 11: "Nightmare at Northoak"
The Dick Powell Theatre	1963	Dan Corbett	Season 2 Episode 24: "Colossus"
Dr. Kildare	1963	John Oliver	Season 3 Episode 12: "Charlie Wade Makes Lots of Shade"
Stoney Burke	1963	Chief Ramsey	Season 1 Episode 23: "Joby"
Bob Hope Presents the Chrysler Theatre	1963	Gene Farrell	Season 1 Episode 10: "Corridor 400"
Kraft Suspense Theatre	1964	Bruce Reynolds	Season 1 Episode 14: "Leviathan Five"
12 O'Clock High	1964–1967	Major Harvey Stovall	61 episodes
The Invaders	1967	Dr. Grayson	Season 1 Episode 4: "Genesis"
Star Trek	1967	Elias Sandoval	Season 1 Episode 24: "This Side of Paradise"
