= Lonelyhearts =

1958 film

- Original Theatrical Poster
- Directed by: Vincent J. Donehue
- Written by: Dore Schary
- Based on: Miss Lonelyhearts; 1933 novel by: Nathanael West Miss Lonelyhearts 1957 play; Howard M. Teichmann
- Produced by: Dore Schary
- Starring: Montgomery Clift; Robert Ryan; Myrna Loy; Dolores Hart; Maureen Stapleton
- Cinematography: John Alton
- Edited by: John Faure; Aaron Stell
- Music by: Conrad Salinger
- Distributed by: United Artists
- Release date: December 26, 1958
- Running time: 100 minutes
- Country: United States
- Language: English
- Budget: $750,000

Lonelyhearts, also known as Miss Lonelyhearts, is a 1958 American drama film directed by Vincent J. Donehue. It is based on the 1957 Broadway play by Howard Teichmann, which in turn is based on the 1933 novel Miss Lonelyhearts by Nathanael West.

The film stars Montgomery Clift, Robert Ryan, Myrna Loy, Jackie Coogan, Dolores Hart, and Maureen Stapleton in her first film role. Stapleton was nominated for an Academy Award and a Golden Globe for Best Supporting Actress for her performance as Fay Doyle.

== Plot ==
The story opens on a small-town street. A man throws a bundle of papers onto the sidewalk from the back of a truck labeled Chronicle. Adam White is sitting in a bar when a woman offers him a drink. He refuses, explaining that alcohol seems to be poisonous to him. After talking with her for a while, he learns she is married to William Shrike, editor-in-chief of the Chronicle, where Adam is hoping to work. The editor shows up to meet his wife only to find her talking with Adam. When Shrike asks how Adam found him, Adam explains: "I heard there was a bar where newspaper people hang out. I came here since it is the closest to the Chronicle, the only paper in town". Florence Shrike says Adam can write, and he deserves the chance to prove it. Shrike retorts: "OK, so write!" Adam hems and haws momentarily, but then delivers the following story: "The Chronicle is pleased to announce the addition of a new member to our staff. He met the editor in chief, who went so far as to insult his own wife in an effort to provoke the new staff member. Instead of punching the editor in the face, he accepted a position on the paper."

Adam tells his girlfriend Justy about his new job. He doesn't tell her about his father, a man named Lassiter, who is doing 25 years in prison for having murdered Adam's mother and her lover. On his first day at the newspaper, Adam is astounded at being assigned the "Miss Lonelyhearts" advice-to-the-lovelorn column. One of his colleagues, reporter Ned Gates, is disappointed, having wanted that column for himself, and another, Frank Goldsmith, openly mocks the readers who seek the column's advice.

After a few weeks, Shrike refuses a request by Adam to give him a different assignment. He also insists that Adam personally contact the letter writers to substantiate their stories. Adam randomly selects a letter from a Fay Doyle and meets her. She relates how her husband Pat came home from the war crippled and impotent. As they share a lonely moment, Adam and Fay are briefly thrown together sexually. When he declines meeting her a second time, she is furious.

Adam decides to leave the newspaper for good. Justy's father offers her a trust endowment to get their new life under way. Pat Doyle turns up with a gun. Adam manages to talk him out of using it. He leaves, whereupon Shrike decides to give some flowers to his own neglected wife.

== Cast ==
- Montgomery Clift as Adam White
- Robert Ryan as William Shrike
- Myrna Loy as Florence Shrike
- Dolores Hart as Justy Sargeant
- Maureen Stapleton as Fay Doyle
- Jackie Coogan as Ned Gates
- Mike Kellin as Frank Goldsmith
- Onslow Stevens as Mr. Lassiter
- Frank Maxwell as Pat Doyle
- Frank Overton as Mr. Sargeant
- John Gallaudet as Johnny, Bartender
- Don Washbrook as Don Sargeant
- Johnny Washbrook as Johnny Sargeant
- J.B. Welch as Charlie
- Mary Alan Hokanson as Edna

== Background ==
Nathanael West's 1933 novel, on which this film was based, was adapted for the screen in 1933 as Advice to the Lovelorn starring Lee Tracy. It was made by Twentieth Century Pictures, distributed by United Artists, and directed by Alfred L. Werker from a screenplay by Leonard Praskins. The 1933 film was more of a comedy-drama than this version.

Howard Teichmann adapted the novel into a stage play titled Miss Lonelyhearts, which opened on Broadway at the Music Box Theatre on October 3, 1957. The production, directed by Alan Schneider and designed by Jo Mielziner, ran for twelve performances.

== Production ==
Dore Schary had been fired from head of production of MGM in 1956. He moved to New York and wrote the hit play Sunrise at Campobello. He then decided to return to filmmaking. He saw Miss Lonelyhearts, bought the rights, and set up the film at United Artists.

Director Vincent Donehue had worked on Sunrise. He had read the book and went to see the play Miss Lonelyhearts and "thought the novel was a very passionate, emotional and moral statement, and when I saw the Howard Teichmann play based on the novel I felt that its main difficulty lay in an alteration of the tone, which made it a very cerebral statement. The opinion coincided with Schary’s own views. He asked me to direct the film."

Schary wrote the script in collaboration with the director. There were two weeks of rehearsal prior to filming.

Myrna Loy said Montgomery Clift and Robert Ryan agreed to make the film at less than their usual fees because they admired the project. Loy agreed to make it because she believed in Schary who was a close friend. However "I questioned the attempt to film a movie in which the main character is actually a Christ figure. It could only be done as a bizarre sort of fantasy, which general audiences were not ready for in 1959. Montgomery Clift always said that it should never have been released as a commercial film; he thought it would have done well in art house. Still, we all had great affection for that picture."

Maureen Stapleton called the script "incredible - except for a ridiculous 'happy' ending."

=== Shooting ===
Filming started 28 July 1958 and took place at the Goldwyn Studios. Donehue wrote "We made Lonelyhearts, a movie with unusual material, without any conscious attempt to compromise or popularize. Schary produced it with an uncommon integrity and allowed me a degree of freedom that was remarkable, when one considers my lack of experience in films."

Clift struggled with addiction to drugs and alcohol through the shoot.

== Reception ==
Variety called the film "so-so. For the first half it’s tedious, usually uneasy trip to nowhere. There is progress in much of the film’s latter half, and United Artists will have to bank on this and a fine though distinctly offbeat and “tortured” performance by Montgomery Clift to help the film."

Filmink called it "a patchy drama with Clift constantly looking like he’s on the verge of a nervous breakdown."

== See also ==
- List of American films of 1958

== Notes ==
- Donehue, Vincent (June 1959). "Director in three mediums". Theatre Arts. pp. 60–62.
- Jones, J.R. (2015). The lives of Robert Ryan. Wesleyan University Press.
- Loy, Myrna (1987). Myrna Loy : being and becoming. Knopf.
