= The Tanks Are Coming (1951 film) =

1951 film by Lewis Seiler

- Original film poster
- Directed by: Lewis Seiler
- Written by: Samuel Fuller (story); Robert Hardy Andrews
- Produced by: Bryan Foy
- Starring: Steve Cochran; Philip Carey; Mari Aldon
- Narrated by: Art Gilmore
- Cinematography: Edwin B. DuPar; Warren Lynch
- Edited by: James Moore
- Music by: William Lava
- Distributed by: Warner Bros. Pictures
- Release dates: November 7, 1951 (Los Angeles); December 5, 1951 (New York)
- Running time: 90 minutes
- Country: United States
- Language: English

The Tanks Are Coming is a 1951 war film directed by Lewis Seiler and starring Steve Cochran and Philip Carey. The story is set in 1944 during World War II in France. The film chronicles the U.S. 3rd Armored Division's advance across northern France and its attempt to pierce the Siegfried Line.

The film is unrelated to the 1941 educational short film of the same title.

== Plot ==
In Normandy in 1944 after D-Day, the crew of tank commander Sgt. Joe Davis fall into despondency following his death. Davis is replaced by Sgt. Francis Sullivan, who rouses the men's anger when he orders that Davis's personal effects be discarded. Sullivan replaces the tank driver with a known drunkard, challenges the loyalty of German-American crew member Heinie Weinburger and fights with Danny Kolowicz.

Despite his unpopular actions, Sully transforms the men into a squad of efficient killers. As they fight their way to the Siegfried Line, Sullivan and his men begin to share a mutual respect.

== Cast ==
- Steve Cochran as Staff Sergeant Francis Aloysius "Sully" Sullivan
- Philip Carey as Lt. Rawson
- Mari Aldon as Patricia Kane
- Paul Picerni as Danny Kolowicz
- Harry Bellaver as Lemchek
- James Dobson as George "Ike" Eisenhower
- George O'Hanlon as Sgt. Tucker
- John McGuire as Col. Matthews
- Robert Boon as Heinrich "Heinie" Weinburger
- Michael Steele as Sgt. Joe Davis
- Robert Horton as Capt. Bob Horner
- Roy Roberts as Commanding General (uncredited)

== Release ==
The film's world premiere was held at the Warner Hollywood Theater on November 7, 1951. A parade of tanks preceded the screening.

== Reception ==
In a contemporary review for The New York Times, critic A. H. Weiler bemoaned the film's "clichés and conventional characterizations that have gone to make up some of the substandard movie glorifications" of World War II and wrote: "Although the off-screen narrator solemnly says that this is 'a story never told before' chances are that reasonable and better facsimiles have certainly been reeled off."

Critic Edwin Schallert of the Los Angeles Times wrote: "It is evident that everybody concerned with this picture has driven hard for a fine technical results. This in itself is rewarding. Even as current war pictures are seemingly very popular, 'The Tanks Are Coming' will probably fall into the proper groove."
