= Timmy Everett =

American actor

- Everett in 1957
- Born: Thomas Arthur Everett; February 14, 1938; Helena, Montana
- Died: March 4, 1977 (aged 39); Manhattan, New York City, New York
- Occupations: Actor, dancer
- Years active: 1952–1977

Timmy Everett (February 14, 1938 – March 4, 1977) was an American actor and dancer. He attended the Neighborhood Playhouse School of the Theatre and debuted at the age of 14 in a TV production of On Your Toes. He won a Theatre World Award in 1957 for his role in The Dark at the Top of the Stairs, and again in 1958 for The Cold Wind and the Warm.

Everett appeared in the 1962 film The Music Man and in the television series Decoy, General Electric Theater, Naked City, Outlaws and Ben Casey.

He died of an apparent heart attack in his sleep on March 4, 1977, in New York City at age 39.
