= Irene Dailey =

American actress (1920–2008)

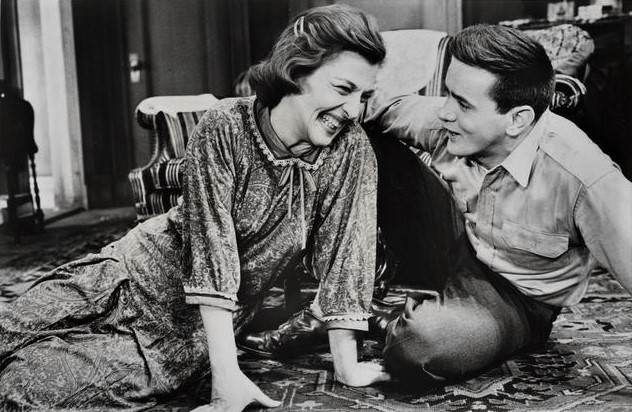
- Dailey and Martin Sheen in The Subject Was Roses, 1965
- Born: September 12, 1920; New York City, U.S.
- Died: September 24, 2008 (aged 88); Santa Rosa, California, U.S.
- Occupation: Actress
- Relatives: Dan Dailey (brother)
- Awards: Sarah Siddons Award (1971) / Drama Desk Award for Rooms (1966)

Irene Dailey (September 12, 1920 – September 24, 2008) was an American stage, film, and television actress.

== Early years ==
Dailey was born on September 12, 1920, in New York City, the daughter of Helen Theresa (née Ryan) and Daniel James Dailey. She had a sister and two brothers, one of whom was actor Dan Dailey. She began appearing in vaudeville at age 8 and performed in summer stock productions in her teenage years. She was a student of Herbert Berghof and Uta Hagen.

== Career ==
By age 42, Dailey had been in "about a dozen Broadway plays", none of which were successful. For 17 of her first 23 years as an actress she worked as a waitress to support herself. During another five-year span she opened a shop on New York's East Side, making and selling lampshades. She also had psychoanalysis to help her deal with her problems.

In 1965, Dailey taught at, and was director of, the School of the Actor's Company in New York.

Dailey received the 1966 Drama Desk Award for her work in Rooms, and played Nettie Cleary in the original Broadway production of the Tony Award-winning drama, The Subject Was Roses (1964). Other Broadway credits included Idiot's Delight, The Good Woman of Szechwan, and You Know I Can't Hear You When the Water's Running.

In 1969, Dailey joined the cast of the long-running CBS serial The Edge of Night as Pamela Stewart, the vindictive wife of Nicole Drake's ex-husband Duane who stabbed Stephanie Martin to death. In 1971 she won the Sarah Siddons Award for her work in Chicago theatre. Dailey later joined the cast of Another World in 1974 as the fourth actress to play the role of family matriarch Liz Matthews. While other members of the Matthews family were written out in the early 1980s, she remained a major character on the show until the summer of 1986, returning in November 1987 on a non-contract basis, being prominently featured in the show's 25th and 30th anniversary shows, and making her last appearance in May 1994.

Her work on Another World was recognized with a Daytime Emmy Award for Outstanding Actress in 1979; two of her fellow nominees were her AW costars Victoria Wyndham and Beverlee McKinsey. The meddling "Aunt Liz" was first a rival with Rachel for the love of Mac Cory, and later became his secretary. As Liz mellowed, Dailey was allowed to show her flair for comedy, but as the Matthews family dwindled onscreen, she became a sounding board for various friends and family and a well-meaning busy-body. After the death of Liz's great niece Sally, Dailey was written out, but the following year was brought back due to popular demand. The Matthews family had a brief resurgence, and Liz became a confidante for her great niece Olivia. After that storyline ended, Liz continued to appear at special events, most notably at Ada Hobson's memorial and at a Cory Publishing gathering which coincided with the show's 30th anniversary. After her final appearance in 1994, she appeared on Broadway in a revival of the Strindberg play The Father, receiving excellent notices for her performance as Frank Langella's nurse who must manipulate him into a straitjacket after he goes insane. Her film credits include No Way to Treat a Lady (1968), Five Easy Pieces (1970) and The Amityville Horror (1979).

== Personal life and death ==
Dailey did not marry, and she had no children. She died on September 24, 2008, in Santa Rosa, California. The cause was colon cancer, according to Arleen Lorrance, a longtime friend. She had been a resident of Guerneville.

== Filmography ==
=== Film ===
Year	Title	Role	Notes
1968	Daring Game	Mrs. Carlyle	
1968	No Way to Treat a Lady	Mrs. Fitts	
1970	Five Easy Pieces	Samia Glavia	
1971	The Grissom Gang	Gladys 'Ma' Grissom	
1979	The Amityville Horror	Aunt Helena	

=== Television ===
Year	Title	Role	Notes
1958	Decoy	Millie Baker	"Blind Date"
1959	Naked City	Amy Gary	"Four Sweet Corners"
1962	Naked City	Auntie Maud	"Goodbye Mama, Hello Auntie Maud"
1962	The Defenders	Mrs. Prinzler	"The Avenger"
1962	Sam Benedict	Amelia Carter	"Everybody's Playing Polo"
1963	The Twilight Zone	Miss Frank	"Mute"
1963	Dr. Kildare	Sara Anderson	"A Trip to Niagara"
1963	The Eleventh Hour	Agatha Miller	"The Bride Wore Pink"
1964	Ben Casey	Caroline Bullard	"Heap Logs and Let the Blaze Laugh Out"
1964	Brenner	Mrs. Friedman	"The Vigilantes"
1965	The Nurses	Annie Cloyne	"Threshold"
1966	Hawk	Hallie Simmons	"How Close Can You Get?"
1968	NET Playhouse	Ruth	"Home"
1969–1970	The Edge of Night	Pamela Stewart	TV series
1972	Jigsaw	Mrs. Cummings	TV film
1974–1986	Another World	Liz Matthews	Contract role
1987	American Playhouse	Mrs. McGuire	"Stacking"
1987–1994	Another World	Liz Matthews	Recurring role (final appearance)

== Selected discography ==
- 1965: Of Poetry and Power: Poems Occasioned by the Presidency and by the Death of John F. Kennedy (Folkways Records)
- 1967: The Wick and the Tallow By Henry Gilfond (Folkways Records)

Awards
Preceded by Barbara Rush	Sarah Siddons Award - Sarah Siddons Society, Chicago; 1971	Succeeded by Lauren Bacall
