= The Cold Wind and the Warm =

1958 stage play by S. N. Behrman

The Cold Wind And The Warm
- Original language: English
- Written by: S. N. Behrman
- Genre: Drama
- Setting: Worcester, New York City; 1908–1914

Premiere
- Date: December 8, 1958
- Place: Morosco Theatre

The Cold Wind And The Warm is a dramatic stage play written by American playwright S. N. Behrman. The play premiered on Broadway at the Morosco Theatre in 1958. The play is semi-autobiographical and based on Behrman's memoirs originally published in The New Yorker and his book The Worcester Account that was published in 1954.

== Production history ==
The play had an out of town tryout at the Locust Theatre in Philadelphia. The play then opened on Broadway at the Morosco Theatre on December 8, 1958, and closed on March 21, 1959, running a total of 120 performances. The play was directed by Harold Clurman. For her performance, Maureen Stapleton was nominated for the Tony Award for Best Actress in a Play.

The New York Times said in their review "If there was a little more time at the moment, it would be possible to express gratitude to all the actors and everyone else concerned, they deserve it. The Cold Wind And The Warm is a cameo carefully designed and executed by expert craftsman."

== Original cast and characters ==
Character	Broadway (1958)
Aunt Ida	Maureen Stapleton
Willie Lavin	Eli Wallach
Norbert Mandel	Sanford Meisner
Mr. Sacher	Morris Carnovsky
Rappaport	Sig Arno
Tobey	Timmy Everett
Myra	Carol Grace
Leah	Suzanne Pleshette
Dan	Sidney Armus
Jim Nightingale	Vincent Gardenia
Aaron	Peter Trytler
Ren	Jada Rowland
