= Robert Boon =

American actor

Robert Boon (October 26, 1916 – January 13, 2015) was a Dutch-born American film, television, and theater actor. His film credits included The Tanks Are Coming in 1951 and Queen of Blood in 1966. Boon's television credits included The Twilight Zone episodes “Deaths-Head Revisited" in 1961 and "Mute" in 1963.

== Military service ==
Boon was born in Haarlem, the Netherlands, on October 26, 1916. During World War II, Boon volunteered to serve a Dutch East Indies oil battalion and was sent to the United States for military training. Boon was transferred to Australia, where he was enlisted to the Australian Army. He took part in the Borneo campaign in May 1945, the last major Allied invasion in the South West Pacific Area during World War II. Following the defeat of Japan, Boon was stationed in Java and Sumatra before returning to the Netherlands.

== Acting career ==
Boon first became interested in theater and acting as a potential career while studying in post-war Amsterdam. However, Boon first took a position with Bataafse Petroleum Maatschappij (BPM), a former subsidiary of Royal Dutch Shell, for financial reasons. BPM sent him to work at its oil facilities in Curaçao. Robert Boon soon joined the Little Theatre, a theater company in Curaçao, and worked part-time as an actor and writer one of the island's radio stations.

He relocated to the United States in the late 1940s. Boon initially moved to New York City, where he worked in live television and radio, before moving to Los Angeles, California, in 1947. He made his film debut in the 1948 film, Berlin Express. Boon's acting career spanned decades, until his retirement during his 80s. He served on the Academy of Motion Picture Arts and Sciences's Best Foreign Language Film's nominating committee for many years.

== Death ==
Robert Boon died at West Hills Hospital in the West Hills neighborhood of Los Angeles on January 13, 2015, at the age of 98. He had been scheduled for transfer to the Motion Picture & Television Country House and Hospital the next day.

== Filmography ==
- Berlin Express (1948) - German Youth #2 (uncredited)
- Fighter Squadron (1948) - German Operator (uncredited)
- Treasure of Monte Cristo (1949) - Boatswain
- Battleground (1949) - German Soldier (uncredited)
- The Flying Saucer (1950) - Barge Captain
- Mister 880 (1950) - Dutchman (uncredited)
- Target Unknown (1951) - Marx (uncredited)
- Go for Broke! (1951) - German Soldier (uncredited)
- Sealed Cargo (1951) - Sailor with Rating (uncredited)
- The Tanks Are Coming (1951) - Heinrich 'Heinie' Weinburger (uncredited)
- Affair in Trinidad (1952) - Pilot (uncredited)
- The Juggler (1953) - Samuel (uncredited)
- The Desert Rats (1953) - German Lieutenant (uncredited)
- Fort Algiers (1953) - Mueller
- The Man in the Gray Flannel Suit (1956) - German Soldier (uncredited)
- Screaming Eagles (1956) - Hans Schacht
- Four Girls in Town (1957) - Karl Wagner (uncredited)
- The Enemy Below (1957) - Chief Engineer (uncredited)
- The Last Blitzkrieg (1959) - Kirsch
- Verboten! (1959) - SS officer
- The Diary of Anne Frank (1959) - SS Man (uncredited)
- G.I. Blues (1960) - German Guitarist (uncredited)
- Plantage Tamarinde (1964) - Ir. Reinders
- Queen of Blood (1966) - Anders Brockman
- Torn Curtain (1966) - Professor Winkelmann (uncredited)
- The Virginian (TV series) (1970) saison 9 episode 07 (Crooked corner) : Steiner
