= The Robert Herridge Theater =

American TV anthology series (1961)

The Robert Herridge Theater is a 30-minute syndicated American television anthology series of dramas by noted authors like John Steinbeck and Edgar Allan Poe. It was produced and hosted by Robert Herridge for CBS Films, Inc. A total of 26 episodes were broadcast from 1959 to 1960. Among its guest stars were Robert Duvall, Maureen Stapleton, William Shatner, Sydney Pollack, Miles Davis and Eli Wallach.
