= Riders to the Sea (1936 film) =

- Directed by: Brian Desmond Hurst
- Written by: Brian Desmond Hurst; Wolfgang Wilhelm; Patrick Kirwan; Francis Stewart
- Based on: play Riders to the Sea by John Millington Synge
- Produced by: John P. Flanagan; Gracie Fields
- Starring: Sara Allgood; Denis Johnston
- Distributed by: BBSC; Metro-Goldwyn-Mayer
- Release date: 13 July 1936
- Running time: 3710 ft 40 minutes
- Country: United Kingdom
- Language: English

Riders to the Sea is a British short film, filmed in 1935 in Ireland. It is based on the 1904 play of the same name, written by John Millington Synge. It was directed by Brian Desmond Hurst with Sara Allgood and Denis Johnston in the title roles.

== Plot ==
A story set in a fishing community in Western Ireland. It concerns Maurya, a woman who loses her husband and her sons at the sea.

== Cast ==
- Sara Allgood as Maurya
- Denis Johnston as Michael
- Kevin Guthrie as Bartley
- Ria Mooney as Cathleen
- Shelah Richards as Nora
- Brigit Laffey

== Production notes ==
- The film was shot in 1935 in Connemara, County Galway.

== Critical response ==
Writing for The Spectator in 1935, Graham Greene praised Fields for her courage and generosity in financing this independent film, however he faulted the film's apparent independence from the viewer, and described the film as "altogether too private" in its presentation. Greene (who admitted a personal disinclination toward Synge's plays) predicted that even Synge's admirers would struggle with the film and suggested that "something has gone badly wrong with the continuity; the loss of act divisions has upset the sense of time".
