= Robert Herridge =

American television producer and writer

- Born: Robert Herridge; January 12, 1914; New Jersey, U.S.
- Died: August 14, 1981 (aged 67); Woodstock, New York, U.S.
- Occupations: Poet, short story writer, television writer and producer
- Years active: 1939–1981

Robert Herridge (January 12, 1914 – August 14, 1981), was a television producer and writer who created the CBS television program Camera Three, among more than 1,700 hours of TV programming, beginning in 1950.

Herridge also served as a writer for the Studio One television series in 1948.

He produced one of the first American network television shows specifically about jazz, the one-hour "The Sound of Jazz", a December 8, 1957 edition of the CBS television series The Seven Lively Arts. "The Sound of Jazz" was essentially a broadcast jam session including many luminaries of jazz, such as Miles Davis, Roy Eldridge, Coleman Hawkins, Ben Webster, Lester Young, Thelonious Monk, Milt Hinton, and Billie Holiday.

Herridge produced and hosted The Robert Herridge Theater, a half-hour dramatic anthology that ran in syndication circa 1959-1960 or in 1961 (sources vary), primarily on educational television stations. One edition, "The Sound of Miles Davis", which Herridge referred to onscreen as "a story told in the language of music", consisted of an April 2, 1959, jazz concert by Davis, John Coltrane, Wynton Kelly, Paul Chambers, Jimmy Cobb, and the Gil Evans Orchestra at CBS TV's Studio 61. It aired July 21, 1960.

Herridge's professional interests extended beyond the world of Jazz as well. In the realm of classical music, he also produced the prime-time special Spring Festival of Music for CBS Television in 1960. The program was created at CBS in collaboration with the director Roger Englander. It showcased performances by several leading American musicians and orchestral ensembles including: Alfredo Antonini, John Browning, the Philadelphia Orchestra and the Symphony of the Air.

During the course of his career, Robert Herridge was the recipient of several professional awards including the George Foster Peabody Award and three Emmy Awards.

Herridge died of a heart attack at his home in Woodstock, New York.
