= John Crosby (media critic) =

20th-century American media critic

- Born: July 21, 1951; Milwaukee, Wisconsin, U.S.
- Died: September 7, 1991 (aged 79); Esmont, Virginia, U.S.
- Occupations: Journalist; TV Host

This line drawing accompanied John Crosby's syndicated newspaper column.

John Crosby (May 18, 1912 – September 7, 1991) was an American newspaper columnist, radio-television critic, novelist and TV host. After winning a Personal Peabody Award for his radio criticism in 1946, he became a member of the Peabody Awards Board of Jurors, serving from 1947 to 1962. During the 1950s, he was generally regarded as the leading critic of television. The latter notwithstanding he was unable to arrest the exponential growth in the viewership of telecasts headlining Elvis Presley, who he attacked viciously in a June 18, 1956 article entitled “Performer's Gyrations May Doom Rock 'n Roll". Although the article had been written in response to Presley's 2nd appearance on The Milton Berle Show, which drew 22.1 million viewers, Presley followed it by appearing, this time at the most coveted moment in prime time television, the Sunday at 8pm slot, and did so at both the Steve Allen and Ed Sullivan shows where he garnered 42.1, 60.7, 56.5 and 54.5 million viewers for NBC and CBS, respectively.

== Early life ==
Crosby was born in Milwaukee, the son of Fred G. Crosby and the former Edna Campbell. His father was in the insurance business. After graduating from New Hampshire's Phillips Exeter Academy, Crosby attended Yale but left without a degree. In 1933, he was a reporter with The Milwaukee Sentinel, moving on to The New York Herald Tribune (1935–41).

== Radio ==
During World War II, he spent five years with the Army News Service, rising to the rank of captain. In the post-war years, he returned to the Herald Tribune and began writing about radio, widening his horizon to television in 1952. That same year, his book-length collection of columns, Out of the Blue, was published, prompting Lewis Gannett to comment: "Crosby is at his best when he engages in the art of amiable murder. He can, by his special personalized art of denunciation, make the most brainless radio program interesting, at least in its death pangs. He slays with zest."

Crosby once observed, "A radio critic is forced to be literate about the illiterate, witty about the witless and coherent about the incoherent."

== Television ==
Crosby was known for his literate, caustic remarks about the television industry. One of his most notable quotes came upon the cancellation of Edward R. Murrow's television series See It Now: "See it Now... is by every criterion television's most brilliant, most decorated, most imaginative, most courageous and most important program. The fact that CBS cannot afford it but can afford Beat the Clock is shocking."

Crosby was so highly respected that he became one of the first media critics to host a television show: the Emmy-winning anthology series The Seven Lively Arts, on CBS. Telecast on Sunday afternoons, it lasted a single season, from late 1957 to early 1958, with individual episodes on such subjects as jazz, ballet and films. The program was notable for showcasing the first (albeit heavily abridged) telecast of Tchaikovsky's ballet The Nutcracker.

== Print ==
From 1965 to 1975 he was a columnist for the British weekly, The Observer.

== Novels ==
In 1977, he moved to a farm outside Esmont, Virginia and turned to writing suspense novels, including Men in Arms (1983).

== Personal life ==
He married Mary B. Wolferth in 1946, and they divorced in 1959. His second wife, the former Katharine J. B. Wood, was a former fashion editor of Edinburgh's The Scotsman. He had two children with Katharine, Alexander and Victoria, and two children with Mary, Margaret and Michael. He died of cancer at home in 1991, age 79.

== Books ==
Among those he wrote:

- Out Of the Blue (1952)
- With Love And Loathing (1963)
- Never Let Her Go (1970)
- Contract On the President (1973)
- Affair Of Strangers (1975)
- Nightfall (1976)
- The Company Of Friends (1977)
- Snake (1977
- Dear Judgment (1979)
- Party Of the Year (1980)
- Penelope Now (1981)
- Men In Arms (1983)
- Take No Prisoners - an Horatio Cassidy Adventure (1985)
- The Family Worth (1987)
- Party Of the Year With Excerpts From the Legend Of the Di Castigliones Annotated
