= Riders to the Sea (opera) =

Opera by Ralph Vaughan Williams

- Opera by Ralph Vaughan Williams
- Vaughan Williams in 1922
- Language: English
- Based on: Riders to the Sea by John Millington Synge
- Premiere: 1 December 1937; Royal College of Music, London

Riders to the Sea is a short one-act opera by Ralph Vaughan Williams, based on the play of the same name by John Millington Synge. The composer completed the score in 1927, but it was not premiered until 1 December 1937, at the Royal College of Music, London. The opera remained largely the province of students and amateurs until it entered the repertoire of Sadler's Wells in 1953.

Vaughan Williams set Synge's text essentially intact, with only a small number of changes. Although the vocal score had been in print since 1936, the full orchestral score was not published until 1973. The composer Edmund Rubbra characterised this work as less an opera than a "spoken drama raised in emotional power and expressiveness to the nth degree". Hugh Ottaway and Michael Kennedy have commented on musical connections between the opera and Vaughan Williams's later Symphony No. 6. Caireann Shannon has noted that Vaughan Williams deliberately avoided use of folksong in the music, and instead relied on the rhythms inherent in Synge's text for the composition.

== Roles ==
Role	Voice type	Premiere Cast, 1 December 1937 (Conductor: Malcolm Sargent)
Bartley	baritone	Alan Coed
Cathleen	soprano	Janet Smith-Miller
Maurya	contralto	Olive Hall
Nora	soprano	Marjorie Steventon
A Woman	mezzo-soprano	Grace Wilkinson

== Synopsis ==
Before the opera begins: Maurya, an elderly Irishwoman, has lost her husband, father-in-law, and four of her six sons at sea.

Maurya's daughters Nora and Cathleen receive word that a body that may be their brother Michael, Maurya's fifth son, has washed up on shore in Donegal, far to the north. The sixth and last son, Bartley, is planning to go to Galway fair to sell horses. Maurya is fearful of the sea winds and pleads with Bartley to stay, but Bartley insists on going and will ride "on the red mare with the grey pony behind him". Maurya predicts that by nightfall she will have no living sons, and her daughters chide her for sending Bartley off with an ill word. Maurya goes after Bartley to bless his voyage. Nora and Cathleen receive clothing from the drowned corpse that confirms it as Michael. Maurya returns home, claiming to have seen the ghost of Michael riding behind Bartley and begins lamenting the loss of the men in her family to the sea. Nora then sees villagers carrying a load, which turns out to be the corpse of Bartley, who has fallen off his horse into the sea and drowned. Maurya laments: "They are all gone now, and there isn't anything more the sea can do to me."

== Recordings ==
- EMI Classics CDM7647302 (CD reissue of the first recording): Norma Burrowes, Margaret Price, Helen Watts, Benjamin Luxon, Pauline Stevens; Ambrosian Singers; Orchestra Nova; Meredith Davies, conductor
- Chandos CHAN 9392: Linda Finnie, Ingrid Attrot, Lynne Dawson, Karl Morgan Daymond, Pamela Helen Stephen; Sinfonia Chorus; Northern Sinfonia; Richard Hickox, conductor
- Kultur D4390 (DVD reissue of the 1988 Kultur VHS recording D20475): Sarah Walker, Yvonne Brennan, Kathleen Tynan, Hugh Mackey, [Mary Sheridan de Bruin, Martin Murphy; Radio Telefís Éireann Chamber Choir and Concert Orchestra; Bryden Thomson, conductor
