= Maureen Stapleton =

American actress (1925–2006)

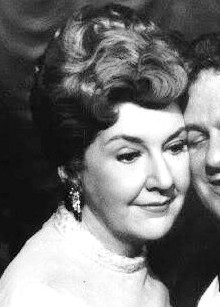
- Stapleton in 1975
- Born: Lois Maureen Stapleton; June 21, 1925; Troy, New York, U.S.
- Died: March 13, 2006 (aged 80); Lenox, Massachusetts, U.S.
- Occupation: Actress
- Years active: 1946–2003
- Spouses: Max Allentuck (m. 1949; div. 1959) David Rayfiel (m. 1963; div. 1966)
- Children: 2
- Awards: Academy Award for Best Supporting Actress; American Theater Hall of Fame

Lois Maureen Stapleton (June 21, 1925 – March 13, 2006) was an American actress. She received numerous accolades, becoming one of the few actors to achieve the Triple Crown of Acting, winning an Academy Award, a Primetime Emmy Award and two Tony Awards. She also received a BAFTA Award and a Golden Globe Award, as well as a nomination for a Grammy Award.

Stapleton started her career in theater with her Broadway debut in The Playboy of the Western World (1946). She went on to receive two Tony Awards for Best Featured Actress in a Play for The Rose Tattoo (1951) and for Best Actress in a Play for The Gingerbread Lady (1971). She was Tony-nominated for her roles in The Cold Wind And The Warm (1959), Toys in the Attic (1960), Plaza Suite (1971) and The Little Foxes (1981).

For her portrayal of Emma Goldman in the historical epic film Reds (1981), she received the Academy Award for Best Supporting Actress. She was also Oscar-nominated for her roles in Lonelyhearts (1958), Airport (1970) and Interiors (1978). During her career, Stapleton acted in films such as Bye Bye Birdie (1963), Plaza Suite (1971), The Fan (1981), Cocoon (1985), The Money Pit (1986) and Nuts (1987).

On television, Stapleton played a variety of roles including in the television film Among the Paths to Eden (1967), for which she won Outstanding Single Performance by an Actress in a Leading Role in a Drama. She was Emmy-nominated for her roles in Queen of the Stardust Ballroom (1975), The Gathering (1977), B.L. Stryker (1989), Miss Rose White (1992) and Road to Avonlea (1995). She received a Grammy Award nomination for narrating To Kill a Mockingbird in 1975. For her life achievement, she was inducted into the American Theatre Hall of Fame in 1981.

== Early life ==
Stapleton was born in Troy, New York, the daughter of John P. Stapleton and Irene (née Walsh), and grew up in a strict Irish American Catholic family. Her father was an alcoholic and her parents separated during her childhood.

== Career ==
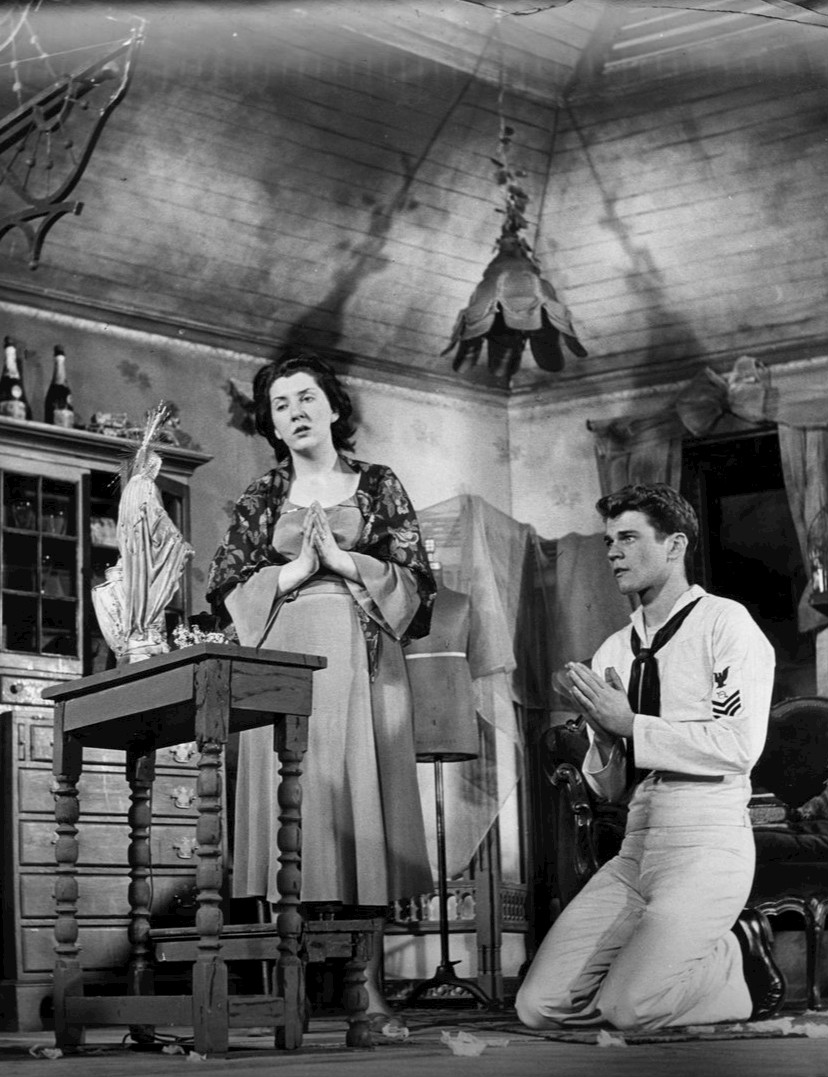
Stapleton with Don Murray in The Rose Tattoo (1951)

Stapleton moved to New York City at the age of 18, and worked as a salesgirl, hotel clerk, and modeled to pay the bills, including for artist Raphael Soyer. She once said that it was her infatuation with the Hollywood actor Joel McCrea which led her into acting. She made her Broadway debut in the production featuring Burgess Meredith of The Playboy of the Western World in 1946. That same year, she played the role of "Iras" in Shakespeare's Antony and Cleopatra in a touring production by actress and producer Katharine Cornell. Stepping in because Anna Magnani refused the role due to her limited English, Stapleton won a Tony Award for her role in Tennessee Williams' The Rose Tattoo in 1951 (Magnani's English improved, however, and she was able to play the role in the film version, winning an Oscar).

Stapleton played in other Williams' productions, including Twenty-Seven Wagons Full of Cotton and Orpheus Descending (and its film adaptation, The Fugitive Kind, co-starring her friend Marlon Brando), as well as in The Cold Wind and the Warm (Tony nomination, 1959) and Lillian Hellman's Toys in the Attic (1960), for which she received another Tony Award nomination. She was nominated for a Tony Award for Neil Simon's Plaza Suite in 1968 and won a second Tony Award for Simon's The Gingerbread Lady, which was written especially for her, in 1971. Later Broadway roles included a Tony-nominated turn as "Birdie" in The Little Foxes, opposite Elizabeth Taylor, and as a replacement for Jessica Tandy in The Gin Game.

Stapleton's film career, though limited, brought her immediate success, with her debut in Lonelyhearts (1958) earning nominations for an Academy Award for Best Supporting Actress and a Golden Globe Award. She appeared in the 1963 film version of Bye Bye Birdie, in the role of Mama Mae Peterson, with Dick Van Dyke, Janet Leigh, Paul Lynde, and Ann-Margret. Stapleton played the role of Dick Van Dyke's mother, even though she was only five months and 22 days older than Van Dyke. She was nominated again for an Oscar for Airport (Golden Globe Award nomination, 1970) and Woody Allen's Interiors (Golden Globe Award nomination, 1978). She won the Best Supporting Actress Oscar for Reds (1981), directed by Warren Beatty, in which she portrayed the Lithuanian-born anarchist, Emma Goldman. In her acceptance speech, she stated, "I would like to thank everyone I've ever met in my entire life." Her later appearances included Johnny Dangerously (1984), Cocoon (1985), and its sequel Cocoon: The Return (1988).

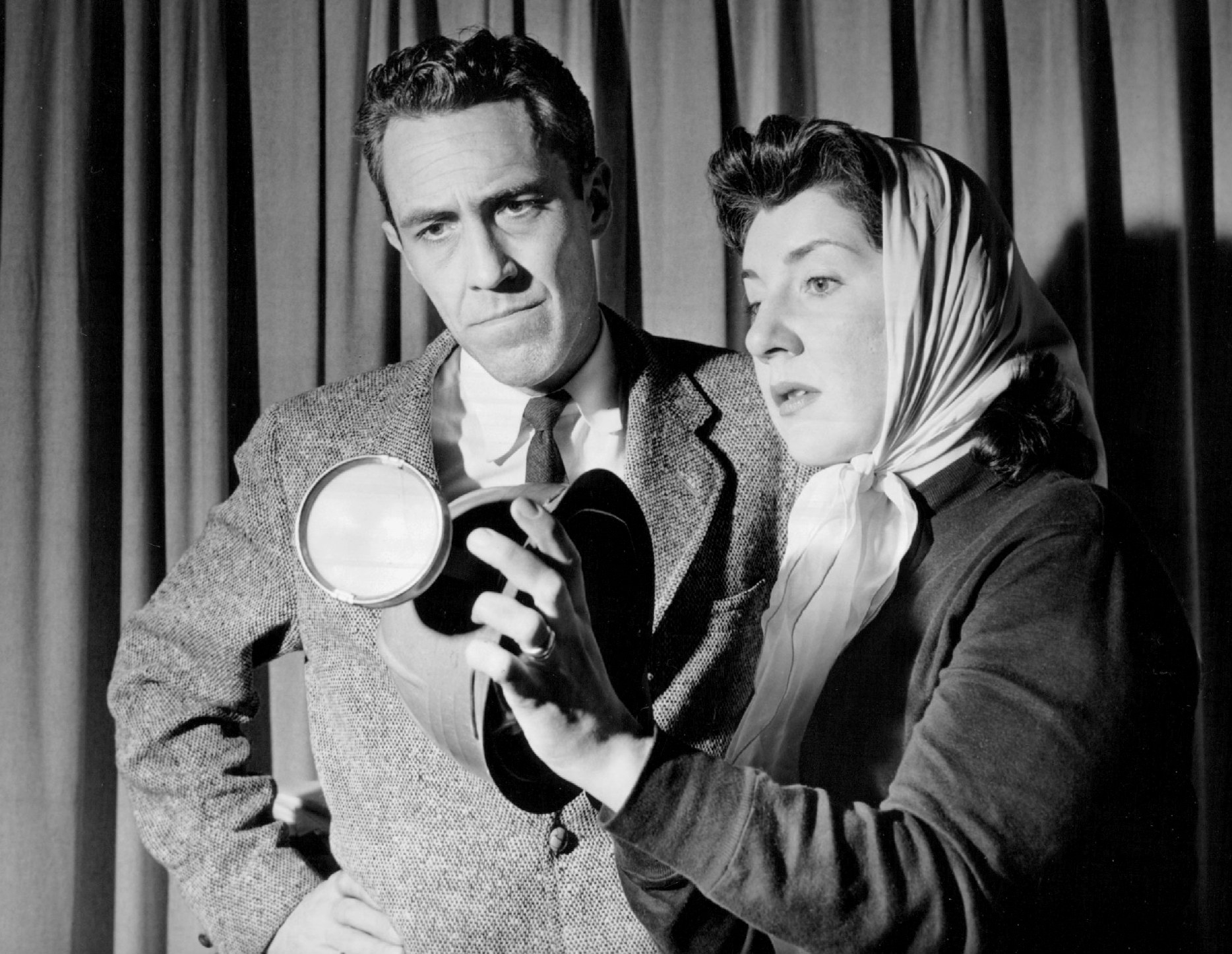
Stapleton with Jason Robards in 1958

Stapleton won a 1968 Emmy Award for her performance in Among the Paths of Eden and was nominated for six more, for Avonlea (1996), Miss Rose White (1992), B.L. Stryker (1989), the television version of All the King's Men (1959), Queen of the Stardust Ballroom (1975), and The Gathering (1977), and Kraft Theatre (1959). She also appeared opposite Laurence Olivier and Natalie Wood in Cat on a Hot Tin Roof (1976).

She was inducted into the American Theatre Hall of Fame in 1981. She was an alumna of the famous Actors Studio in New York City, led by Lee Strasberg, where she became friends with Marilyn Monroe, who was only one year younger than Stapleton. She was impressed with Monroe's talent, and always thought it was a shame that Monroe was rarely allowed to play roles beyond the ditzy blonde. By comparison, Stapleton thought herself lucky: "I never had that problem. People looked at me on stage and said, 'Jesus, that broad better be able to act.'" One of the most famously remembered scenes at the studio was when Stapleton and Monroe acted in Anna Christie together.

Despite her association with Strasberg, Stapleton cited Mira Rostova as her most influential acting teacher. She appeared with Rostova and another of Rostova's pupils, Montgomery Clift, Off-Broadway in The Seagull (1954). Additionally, in his book Sanford Meisner on Acting, Meisner cites Stapleton as being "a wonderful actress." The pair starred together on Broadway in The Cold Wind and the Warm.

She was nominated for a 1975 Grammy Award for the spoken word recording of To Kill a Mockingbird.

She hosted the 19th episode of Season 4 of NBC's Saturday Night Live in 1979.

== Personal life and death ==
Stapleton's first husband was Max Allentuck, general manager to the producer Kermit Bloomgarden, and her second was playwright David Rayfiel, from whom she divorced in 1966. She had a son, Daniel, and a daughter, Katharine, by her first husband. Her daughter, Katharine Allentuck, played a single movie role, that of "Aggie" in Summer of '42 (Stapleton herself also had a minor, uncredited role in the film as the protagonist's mother, though only her voice is heard; she does not appear on camera). Her son, Daniel Allentuck, is a documentary filmmaker.

Stapleton suffered from anxiety and alcoholism for many years, and once told an interviewer, "The curtain came down, and I went into the vodka." She also said that her unhappy childhood contributed to her insecurities, which included a fear of flying, airplanes, and elevators.

Stapleton was a member of the Writers and Artists for Peace in the Middle East, a pro-Israel group. In 1984, she signed a letter protesting German arms sales to Saudi Arabia.

A lifelong heavy smoker, Stapleton died of chronic obstructive pulmonary disease in 2006 at her home in Lenox, Massachusetts.

In 1981 Hudson Valley Community College in Stapleton's childhood city of Troy, New York, dedicated a theater in her name.

== Acting credits ==
=== Film ===
Year	Title	Role	Notes
1955	Main Street to Broadway	Maureen Stapleton - First Nighter	Uncredited
1958	Lonelyhearts	Fay Doyle	
1960	The Fugitive Kind	Vee Talbot	
1961	A View from the Bridge	Beatrice Carbone	
1963	Bye Bye Birdie	Mama Mae Peterson	
1969	Trilogy	Mary O'Meaghan	Segment: "Among the Paths to Eden"
1970	Airport	Inez Guerrero	
1971	Summer of '42	Hermie's mother	Voice, Uncredited
1971	Plaza Suite	Karen Nash	
1978	Interiors	Pearl	
1979	Lost and Found	Jemmy	
1979	The Runner Stumbles	Mrs. Shandig	
1981	On the Right Track	Mary the Bag Lady	
1981	The Fan	Belle Goldman	
1981	Reds	Emma Goldman	
1984	Johnny Dangerously	Ma Kelly	
1985	Cocoon	Marilyn Luckett	
1986	The Money Pit	Estelle	
1986	The Cosmic Eye	Mother Earth	Voice
1986	Heartburn	Vera	
1987	Sweet Lorraine	Lillian Garber	
1987	Made in Heaven	Aunt Lisa	
1987	Nuts	Rose Kirk	
1988	Cocoon: The Return	Marilyn 'Mary' Luckett	
1988	Doin' Time on Planet Earth	Helium Balloon Saleslady	
1992	Passed Away	Mary Scanlan	
1994	The Last Good Time	Ida Cutler	
1994	Trading Mom	Mrs. Cavour	
1997	Addicted to Love	Nana	
1998	Wilbur Falls	Wilbur Falls High Secretary	
2003	Living and Dining	Mrs. Lundt	Final film role

=== Television ===
Year	Title	Role	Notes
1954	Medic	Evelyn Strauss	Episode: "Day 10"
1954	The Philco Television Playhouse	Daughter	Episode: "The Mother"
1955	The Philco Television Playhouse	Mrs. Johnson	Episode: "Incident in July"
1956	Armstrong Circle Theatre	Mrs. Elizabeth Steigerwald	Episode: "H.R. 8438: The Story of a Lost Boy"
1956	The Alcoa Hour	Vi Miller	Episode: "No License to Kill (II)"
1956	Studio One in Hollywood	Rachel Jackson	Episode: "Rachel"
1958	Kraft Theatre	Sadie Burke	Episode: "All the King's Men"
1959	Playhouse 90	Pilar	Episode: "For Whom the Bell Tolls"
1960	CBS Repertoire Workshop	Tessie	Episode: "Tessie Malfitano and Anton Waldek"
1960	The Robert Herridge Theater	Maurya	Episode: "Riders to the Sea"
1961	Car 54, Where Are You?	Gypsy Woman	Episode: "The Gypsy Curse"
1961	Naked City	Abbey Bick	Episode: "Ooftus Goofus"
1962	Naked City	Ruth Cullan	Episode: "Kill Me While I'm Young So I Can Die Happy!"
1962	The DuPont Show of the Week	Professor Gretchen Anna Thaelman	Episode: "The Betrayal"
1964	East Side/West Side	Molly Cavanaugh	Episode: "One Drink at a Time"
1967	Among the Paths to Eden	Mary O'Meaghan	Television movie
1969	Mirror, Mirror Off the Wall	Ruthie Maxwell	Television movie
1974	Tell Me Where It Hurts	Connie	Television movie
1975	Queen of the Stardust Ballroom	Bea Asher	Television movie
1976	The Lively Arts	Amanda Wingfield	Episode: "Tennessee Williams' The Glass Menagerie"
1976	Cat on a Hot Tin Roof	Big Mama	Television movie
1977	The Gathering	Kate	Television movie
1979	Letters from Frank	Betty Miller	Television movie
1979	The Gathering, Part II	Kate Thornton	Television movie
1979	Saturday Night Live	Herself (host)	Episode: "Maureen Stapleton/Linda Ronstadt and Phoebe Snow"
1982	The Electric Grandmother	Grandmother	Television movie
1982	Little Gloria... Happy at Last	Nurse Emma Kieslich	Television movie
1983	Great Performances	White Queen	Episode: "Alice in Wonderland"
1984	Sentimental Journey	Ruthie	Television movie
1984	Family Secrets	Maggie Lukauer	Television movie
1985	Private Sessions	Dr. Liz Bolger	Television movie
1988	The Thorns	Peggy / Mrs. Hamilton	2 episodes: "The Other Maid" / "The Maid"
1988	Liberace: Behind the Music	Frances Liberace	Television movie
1989	B.L. Stryker	Auntie Sue	Episode: "Auntie Sue"
1989	The Equalizer	Emily Rutherford	Episode: "The Caper"
1992	Last Wish	Ida Rollin	Television movie
1992	Miss Rose White	Tanta Perla	Television movie
1992	Lincoln	Sarah Bush Lincoln	Voice; Television movie
1995	Road to Avonlea	Maggie MacPhee	Episode: "What a Tangled Web We Weave"

=== Theatre ===
Year	Title	Role	Venue	Ref.
1946–1947	The Playboy of the Western World	Sara Tansey / Pegeen Mike (replacement)	Booth Theatre, Broadway	
1947–1948	Antony and Cleopatra	Iras	Martin Beck Theatre, Broadway	
1949–1950	Detective Story	Miss Hatch	Hudson Theatre, Broadway	
1950	The Bird Cage	Emily Williams	Coronet Theatre, Broadway	
1951	The Rose Tattoo	Serafina Delle Rose	Martin Beck Theatre, Broadway	
1953	The Crucible	Elizabeth Proctoer (replacement)	Martin Beck Theatre, Broadway	
1953	The Emperor's Clothes	Bella	Ethel Barrymore Theatre, Broadway	
1953	Richard III	Lady Anne	New York City Center, Broadway	
1955	27 Wagons Full of Cotton	Flora Meighan	Playhouse Theatre	
1957	Orpheus Descending	Lady Torrance	Martin Beck Theatre, Broadway	
1958–1959	The Cold Wind And The Warm	Aunt Ida	Morosco Theatre, Broadway	
1960–1961	Toys in the Attic	Carrie Berniers	Hudson Theatre, Broadway	
1965	The Glass Menagerie	The Mother	Brooks Atkinson Theatre, Broadway	
1966	The Rose Tattoo	Serafina Delle Rose	Billy Rose Theatre, Broadway	
1968–1970	Plaza Suite	Karen Nash / Muriel Tate / Norma Hubley	Plymouth Theatre, Broadway	
1970	Norman, Is That You?	Beatrice Chambers	Lyceum Theatre, Broadway	
1970–1971	The Gingerbread Lady	Evy Meara	Plymouth Theatre, Broadway	
1972	The Country Girl	Georgie Elgin	Billy Rose Theatre, Broadway	
1972	The Secret Affairs of Mildred Wild	Mildred Wild	Ambassador Theatre, Broadway	
1975–1976	The Glass Menagerie	The Mother	Circle in the Square Theatre, Broadway	
1977–1978	The Gin Game	Fonisa Dorsey (replacement)	John Golden Theatre, Broadway	
1981	The Little Foxes	Birdie Hubbard	Martin Beck Theatre, Broadway	

== Awards and nominations ==
Year	Award	Category	Nominated work	Result	Ref.
1958	Academy Awards	Best Supporting Actress	Lonelyhearts	Nominated	
1970	Academy Awards	Best Supporting Actress	Airport	Nominated	
1978	Academy Awards	Best Supporting Actress	Interiors	Nominated	
1981	Academy Awards	Best Supporting Actress	Reds	Won	
1970	British Academy Film Awards	Best Actress in a Supporting Role	Airport	Nominated	
1982	British Academy Film Awards	Best Actress in a Supporting Role	Reds	Won (Note: Tied with Rohini Hattangadi for Gandhi.)	
1996	CableACE Awards	Actress in a Dramatic Special/Series	Avonlea (Episode: "What a Tangled Web We Weave")	Nominated	
1971	Drama Desk Awards	Outstanding Performance	The Gingerbread Lady	Won	
1958	Golden Globe Awards	Best Supporting Actress – Motion Picture	Lonelyhearts	Nominated	
1970	Golden Globe Awards	Best Supporting Actress – Motion Picture	Airport	Won (Note: Tied with Karen Black for Five Easy Pieces.)	
1971	Golden Globe Awards	Best Supporting Actress – Motion Picture	Plaza Suite	Nominated	
1978	Golden Globe Awards	Best Supporting Actress – Motion Picture	Interiors	Nominated	
1981	Golden Globe Awards	Best Supporting Actress – Motion Picture	Reds	Nominated	
1975	Grammy Awards	Best Spoken Word Recording	To Kill a Mockingbird	Nominated	
1978	Los Angeles Film Critics Association Awards	Best Supporting Actress	Interiors	Won (Note: Tied with Mona Washbourne for Stevie.)	
1981	Los Angeles Film Critics Association Awards	Best Supporting Actress	Reds	Won	
1978	National Society of Film Critics Awards	Best Supporting Actress	Interiors	2nd Place	
1981	National Society of Film Critics Awards	Best Supporting Actress	Reds	Won	
1966	New York Emmy Awards	Individuals	New York Television Theatre	Won	
1978	New York Film Critics Circle Awards	Best Supporting Actress	Interiors	Won	
1981	New York Film Critics Circle Awards	Best Supporting Actress	Reds	Runner-up	
1959	Primetime Emmy Awards	Best Single Performance by an Actress	Kraft Television Theatre (Episode: "All the King's Men")	Nominated	
1968	Primetime Emmy Awards	Outstanding Single Performance by an Actress in a Leading Role in a Drama	Among the Paths to Eden	Won	
1975	Primetime Emmy Awards	Outstanding Lead Actress in a Special Program – Drama or Comedy	Queen of the Stardust Ballroom	Nominated	
1978	Primetime Emmy Awards	Outstanding Lead Actress in a Drama or Comedy Special	The Gathering	Nominated	
1989	Primetime Emmy Awards	Outstanding Guest Actress in a Drama Series	B.L. Stryker (Episode: "Auntie Sue")	Nominated	
1992	Primetime Emmy Awards	Outstanding Supporting Actress in a Miniseries or a Special	Miss Rose White	Nominated	
1996	Primetime Emmy Awards	Outstanding Guest Actress in a Drama Series	Avonlea (Episode: "What a Tangled Web We Weave")	Nominated	
1951	Theatre World Awards		The Rose Tattoo	Won	
1951	Tony Awards	Best Supporting or Featured Actress in a Play	The Rose Tattoo	Won	
1959	Tony Awards	Best Leading Actress in a Play	The Cold Wind And The Warm	Nominated	
1960	Tony Awards	Best Leading Actress in a Play	Toys in the Attic	Nominated	
1968	Tony Awards	Best Leading Actress in a Play	Plaza Suite	Nominated	
1971	Tony Awards	Best Leading Actress in a Play	The Gingerbread Lady	Won	
1981	Tony Awards	Best Featured Actress in a Play	The Little Foxes	Nominated	
