= Seventh-day Adventism in popular culture =

Seventh-day Adventist Church in popular culture refers to the coverage of Adventists and Adventism in film, television, literature, postage stamps and have been discussed in the media for their longevity. Adventists have impacted world eating habits in the breakfast and health food areas.

One author wrote, "popular culture hasn’t often been very kind to Adventists."

== Representation in cinema ==
The movie Evil Angels (released as A Cry in the Dark outside of Australia and New Zealand) portrays the events surrounding the death of Azaria Chamberlain, the daughter of Seventh-day Adventist Church pastor Michael Chamberlain and his wife Lindy. Lindy is falsely accused and convicted of killing the nine-week-old baby, and the public's unfamiliarity with of the practices of the religion are shown as one of the causes of public opinion turning against the Chamberlains.

Another Australian film, The Nostradamus Kid, depicts a coming-of-age story in which a Seventh-day Adventist young man grows up in the 1950s.

2016 Hollywood film Hacksaw Ridge depicts the story of Desmond Doss, a Seventh-Day Adventist medic who exhibited extraordinary bravery in the Pacific Theatre during World War II, including single-handedly saving the lives of at least 75 wounded American soldiers in one night under heavy enemy fire on Maeda Escarpment Okinawa, for which he was awarded the Medal of Honor. Doss saw himself as a conscientious cooperator and voluntary enlisted in the US Army to be a medic during the war. He suffered significant abuse and was court martialed for his personal beliefs.

The 2004 film Hotel Rwanda focuses on the actions of Paul Rusesabagina who was internationally honored for saving 1,268 civilians during the Rwandan genocide. Rusesabagina was educated in Adventist elementary and secondary schools and describes himself as a "lapsed Adventist" in his autobiography.

== Representations in television ==
In the American series Gilmore Girls, one of the recurring characters, Mrs. Kim, is a strict, caricatured Seventh-day Adventist.

In the House episode "Here Kitty", Dr. Gregory House refers to the events surrounding William Miller and the "Great Disappointment" of 1844. He remarks about Miller, "every time he was irrefutably proved wrong, it redoubled everyone's belief." Towards the end of the episode the patient rebuts House by saying "his followers never faded out, they became the Seventh-day Adventists – a major religion".

The 1970s situational comedy, All in the Family alludes briefly to Adventists. In the sixth season episode "The Little Atheist", main character Archie Bunker says, speaking of his unborn grandson, "Raise him a Luferan if you want, raise him a Norman with seven wives, a holy roller, a Seventh-day Adventurer".

The Family Guy tenth season episode "Livin' on a Prayer" makes light of some people's skepticism towards Adventists. Lois Griffin, the mother from the main family in the series, states, "I don't know who's crazier, Christian Scientists or those Seventh-day Adventists." The scene cuts to a scene where one Methodist man explains his faith as a Methodist and another man explains his faith as a Seventh-day Adventist. The second man says the same thing as the first man, except that they go to church on Saturdays instead of Sundays, causing the first man to react in shock.

Girls' Season 4 episode "Tad & Loreen & Avi & Shanaz" complains about the bothersome persistence of door-to-door evangelist Adventists, confusing Jehovah's Witnesses with Seventh-day Adventists. The fictional character Avi Mensusen, states, "Shanaz, do we get Watch Tower? It's those annoying Seventh-day Adventists, again."

The Leftovers' first episode of Season 3 there are some strong references to the event of the Great Disappointment. The intro is set back in the 19th century of America, showing a small family giving away their possessions, a group of people waiting for something on top of roofs and a congregation where someone is preaching about an event that will occur later in 1844. The event is strongly suggested to be the second coming of Jesus.

On Brazilian television, the Adventist Church has been represented a few times in a pejorative manner in the humorous program Zorra Total, from Rede Globo, the largest broadcaster in the country. In one episode a construction company accused of corruption and money laundering disguises itself as an Adventist church to avoid being arrested by the federal police in a satire Operation Car Wash. In another episode a pastor founds the "Seventh Digit Admilssista Church", in which a false pastor named Admilson and auxiliaries exorcise the faithful, speak in strange languages, and ask for exorbitant amounts of tithes and offerings, referencing bank accounts of more than one million reais. Several pastors of the denomination such as Gilberto Theiss and Michelson Borges released letters of repudiation against the Program Zorra Total and Rede Globo, arguing the disrespect to the Adventist faith and considered the act as blasphemy.

The thirteenth season of reality show RuPaul's Drag Race features a contestant named Ethan Mundt who uses the stage name Utica Queen revealed he is a Seventh-Day Adventist.

== Representations in literature ==
In Black Boy (1945) by Richard Wright, "Granny" is said to be a Seventh-day Adventist.

In Alas, Babylon (1959) by Pat Frank, one character says to another that Adventists such as him do not drink or trade in whisky.

In The Stand (1978) by Stephen King, the character Stan Nogotny described the city of Boulder, Colorado "as if the Catholics, Baptist, and Seventh-day Adventists had gotten together with the Democrats and the Moonies to create a religious-political Disneyland."

The Brothers K (1992) by David James Duncan includes Adventist characters.

The Road to Wellville (1993) is a heavily fictionalized story of John Harvey Kellogg, the Adventist doctor who invented corn flakes. The Road to Wellville 1994 film is based on the book.

In Towing Jehovah (1994) by James Morrow, a character named Neil described his caution around religious people, citing an instance of a Seventh-day Adventist suggesting he accept Jesus to avoid Armageddon. (see: Seventh-day Adventist eschatology)

In The Terminal Experiment (1995) by Robert J. Sawyer, a character explains the values of being immortal, including studying various faiths including Seventh-day Adventism.

Tree of Smoke (2007) by Denis Johnson features Kathy Jones, a Seventh-day Adventist aid worker

== Representations on postage stamps ==
Postage stamps are used by countries to celebrate their culture and important people, places and events. The Seventh-day Adventist Church is the sixth-largest highly international religious body and operates in over 200 countries and territories so a number of commemorative postage stamp issues by various countries have portrayed the Seventh-day Adventist Church and other Adventist subjects. This list is organized by the first date a postal authority issued a Seventh-day Adventist themed stamp.

=== Madagascar ===
In 1967, the first depiction specifically of an Adventist subject on a postage stamp occurred in the Malagasy Republic (which has since achieved independence as Madagascar) when Paositra Malagasy issued a stamp showing the Adventist mission headquarters and church building in Tamatave. The "Temple Adventist", a mosque and a Catholic Cathedral were each shown on a stamp in the three stamp set.

=== Norfolk Island ===
In 1967–1968, Norfolk Island Postal Service issued a series of definitive stamps depicting historic ships, including a 1968 20c depicting the Seventh-day Adventist owned mission schooner the Pitcairn. In 1856 Pitcairn Island was completely evacuated to than deserted Norfolk Island, so the Pitcairners become the first non-convict residents of Norfolk. The Pitcairn ship brought the first Adventist missionaries and three Pitcairn islander converts to Norfolk in 1891. They shared the Adventist message with their relatives, quickly establishing an Adventist Church in part of the old prison. The Pitcairn would visit several more times over the years. The same ship was later depicted on several Pitcairn Island stamps discussed below.

In 1981 Norfolk Island issued a 24c Christmas stamp depicting the island's Seventh-day Adventist Church with its sign and the printed words SEVENTH DAY ADVENTIST CHURCH in all caps.

=== Samoa ===
Samoa (Western Samoa until 1997) has made three Seventh-day Adventist related issues to date.

The first stamp issued in 1970 shows the Seventh-Adventist Sanatorium (hospital) building in Apia which served from 1896 to 1906.

The 1979 Christmas miniature sheet includes four stamps showing different churches and an additional five churches surrounding the actual stamps. A Seventh-day Adventist Church is shown in the lower left of the sheet.

A 2007 stamp featured the Fusi Saoluafata church, on Upolu Island with the heading "SDA Church". It came in a pane of 12 stamps showing various church buildings on the islands.

=== Pitcairn Island ===
The small isolated UK colony Pitcairn Island has issued the most stamps with a Seventh-day Adventist connection of any postal authority due to the strong connection to the island. Pitcairn started printing stamps in 1940 and although there is little demand for postage from the less than 50 people in the local population, postal releases by Pitcairn are highly collected around the world and represent a significant part of the isolated island's revenue.

Seventh-day Adventist connected issues include:

- 1958:The church school and teachers house stamps
- 1975: The Pitcairn owned by the Adventist church.
- 1977: The island church, which is the Seventh-day Adventist church on the island.
- 1986: A series of four stamps to celebrate 100 years of Adventism on the island. The stamps show the four successive Adventist Churches built on the top of each stamp with the lower portions showing John Tay, the Pitcairn mission schooner (again), a baptism, and members singing hymns to a departing ship.
- 1997: A series of four healthcare stamps depicted the Adventist-operated Island Health Center
- 1997: A second island church stamp
- 2012: Roy Clark (1893-1980) shown with his wife May. Clark served as the island postmaster, schoolmaster, Adventist church elder and historian.
- At least three more Adventist individuals have been featured

=== Malawi ===
In 1978 Malawi issued a series of stamps showing churches including a 4P Christmas stamp picturing the Malamulo Mission.

=== Tonga ===
A 1979 Tonga stamp included the Nuku'alofa Seventh-day Adventist church in the lower right of the 22s stamp bearing the text TONGA The Friendly Islands Decade of Progress 1969 to 1979.

A 1981 Tonga stamp shows an Adventist camp meeting.

=== Papua New Guinea ===
In 1981 Papua New Guinea issued a stamp that said "Mission Aviation SDA 1964" with an image of an Adventist plane used to provide medical and other aid to remote villages inaccessible by road. The Adventist Church has operated mission planes in the country since 1964.

=== Bahamas ===
In a 1982 Christmas 12c issue, the Bahamas issued its first Adventist-themed stamp depicting the Centerville Church in Nassau the Bahamas first Adventist congregation organized in 1911.

A 2009 postage stamp depicts Grant's Town Adventist Church on New Providence Island.

=== United States ===
A February 1986 US Postal Service stamp commemorated Sojourner Truth (1797-1893) who was a famous advocate for abolition of slavery and women's rights. Truth was pictured on the Black History series stamp with a double portrait to emphasize her two focused fights against slavery and for women's rights. She is expected to be pictured on the back of a new US$10 bill by 2020.

A November 11, 2013 stamp issue by the US Post Office commemorating Medal of Honor winners included reference on the backing sheet to Seventh-day Adventist US Army medic Desmond Doss who was the only winner of the American's highest decoration for bravery who refused to kill or carry any weapon, beliefs that were informed by his Adventist faith. The stamp was also available as a cover with Doss's story and image of Doss receiving the Metal of Honor from President Truman.

While not mentioning the church or a high-profile member, the October 1998 "Giving and Sharing an American Tradition" USPS stamp has a deep Adventist connection. The first class letter rate 32c stamp was the product of 27 years of advocating by Milton Murray for the release of a philanthropy themed stamp. Murray wanted to see recognition for all the small charities that would never get their own stamp, so he wrote politicians and the Postmaster General suffering rejection after rejection until finally in 1998 the stamp was approved and issued. Murray devoted his life to raising money for the church and charitable activities. He founded the Adventist Church operated 'Philanthropic Service for Institutions (PSI) in the 1970s and served as the PSI director for 20 years. As an advocate for organized giving he helped found many charities. Murray received several independent awards for his leadership in the philanthropic field.

=== Cook Islands ===
In 1990, the Cook Islands issued a block of four stamps featuring individuals representative of the four main religions in the territory. Dr. Joseph E. Caldwell, an Adventist missionary who arrived on the Pitcairn (schooner) and did much to develop the church in the Cook Islands in the face of significant persecution. He also established a hospital in the Cook Islands during his eight years there. Dr Caldwell was featured in the highest value $1.60 stamp while the independent Cook Islands Church, Roman Catholic and Mormon Churches were the subject of the other stamps in the series. Although there are only about 11,700 people resident in the Cook Islands over 900 Adventist members meet in 15 churches there.

=== Uruguay ===
In 1996 Uruguay issued a $3.50 stamp to celebrate "100 Anos Inglasia Adventista del 7th dia en Uruguay" that features a stained glass style three angels of Revelation 14 with trumpets over the earth. This imagery is particularly relevant to Adventists who place great emphasis on taking the three angels message to the whole world.

=== Vanuatu ===
A 1996 Vanuatu postal stamp showed the Port Vila Seventh-day Adventist Church in the upper left of the stamp. Two individuals are also depicted.

=== British Virgin Islands ===
In 1999 the Seventh-day Adventist Church at Fat Hogs Bay in the British Virgin Islands was shown on a 35c stamp.

=== Canada ===
In July 2000, Canada Post marked the 57th worldwide General Conference of Seventh-day Adventists meetings held in Toronto, Canada with a single domestic-rate (46 cent) commemorative stamp. First day cancelations were issued in Toronto at the start of the GC Session.

=== Russia ===
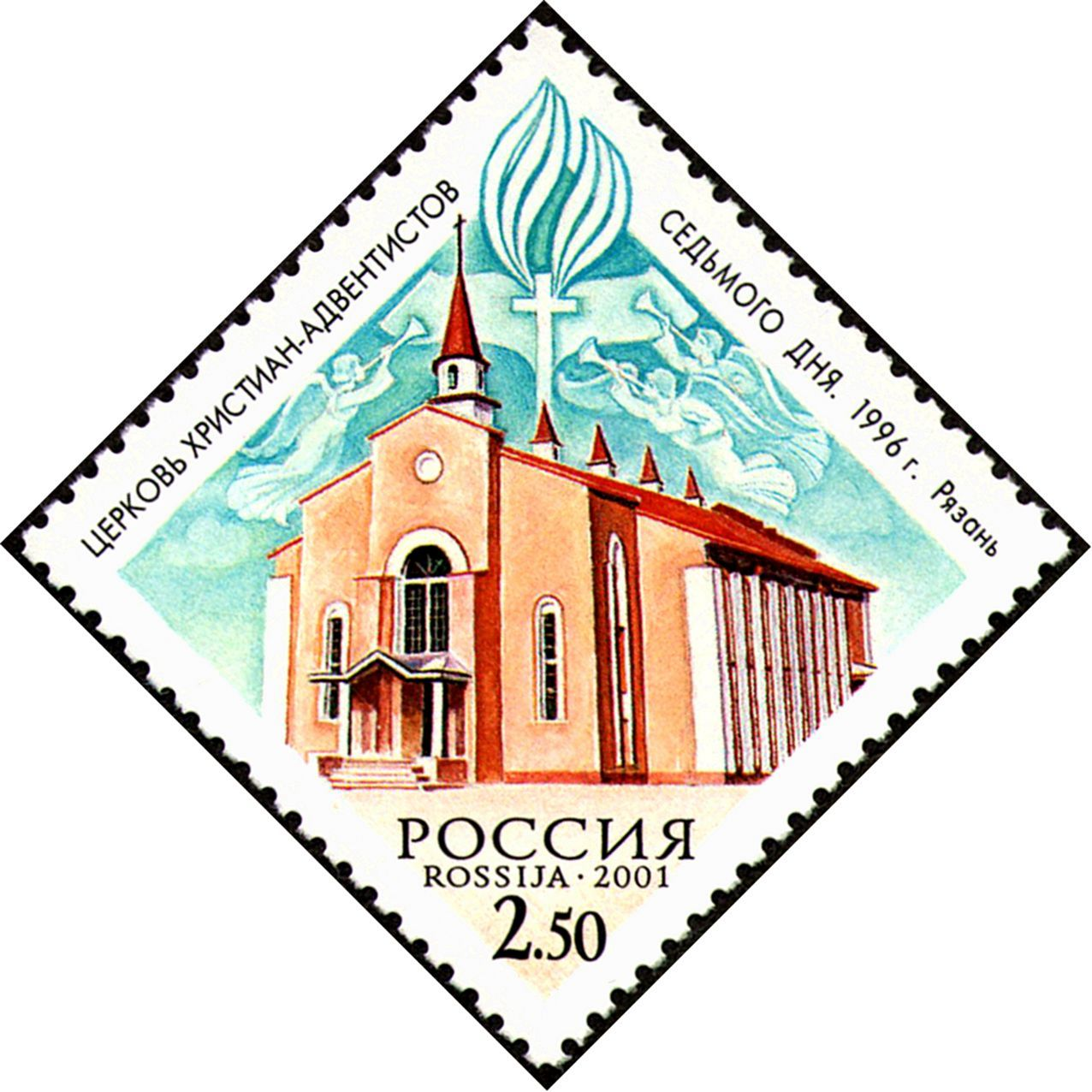
In July 2001, the Russian Post issued a stamp portraying the Adventist church in Ryazan, as part of a series on religious buildings. This was the first depiction of an Adventist church on a Russian stamp.

=== Fiji ===
In 2002 Fiji issued four stamps to celebrate Operation Open Heart. The mission to do open heart surgeries and train doctors in heart surgery techniques was launched by Russell Lee and two others at Sydney Adventist Hospital in 1986 with a mission to Tonga. Supported by Sydney Adventist Hospital and ADRA (Adventist Development and Relief Agency) using volunteer staff, Operation Open Heart expanded internationally to Tonga, Nepal, Vanuatu, Papua New Guinea, Fiji, China, Mongolia, Solomon Islands, Vietnam, Myanmar, Cambodia, Rwanda, Philippines and Tanzania. The range of surgery types expanded to From Cardiac surgery, the projects have expanded to include cleft lip and palate reconstruction, burns surgery, uterine prolapse surgery, women's health, orthopaedic reconstruction surgery and primary health care. Team members have been honoured by medals and awards from various countries for their service. In any way Operation Open Heart represents the worldwide medical missions of the Seventh-day Adventist Church.

=== Kiribati ===
In 2003 Kiribati issued a stamp depicting the London (Port Camp) Seventh-day Adventist Church on Kiritimati or Christmas Island.

=== Philippines ===
In February 2005, the Philippine Postal Corporation issued a 6p stamp (domestic letter rate) commemorating the 100 year anniversary of the Seventh-day Adventist Church entering the Philippines. The stamp is based on a 1967 painting "God watches over Manila" by O.T. Navarra that hung in an Adventist hospital and depicts Jesus with his arms stretched out over the cityscape. In addition to the painting the stamp includes elements super imposed over the painting including the denomination, church name and logo, a church building located in the North of the country, the years 1905–2005. The stamp was designed by long time Philippines post office employee Alfonso Divina who is also an Adventist member. Leomer Batulayan managed the process of getting the stamp approved and issued. Belatulayan was the former director of the Adventist Development and Relief Agency in the Philippines,

=== Brazil ===
In 2005 Brazil overprinted stamps to recognize a country-wide Adventist Pathfinder Camporee. A 2009 stamp issued in Brazil featured the Central Adventist Church of Curitiba. The 2200 seat structure was recognized for its innovative architecture and design.

=== Chile ===
In 2006, the Chilean Postal Corporation issued a three stamp set (images) that commemorated the 100th anniversary of Universidad Adventista de Chile also known as Chile Adventist University. Each shows buildings in the history of the school. The stamps marked one of the first times any South American national government has officially recognized the Adventist Church.

=== Cayman Islands ===
The 2007 Cayman Islands Christmas stamps featured stained glass windows of six island churches. The 80c stamp is the window from the East End Seventh-day Adventist Church.

=== Montserrat ===
A 2011 Christmas release by Montserrat featured the refurbished New Enenezer Seventh-day Adventist Church building. The 1997 volcanic eruption destroyed this building and 5 other of the 7 Adventist churches on the island while the remaining Adventist structures were used as temporary housing for evacuees. Adventists celebrated 100 years in Montserrat in 2015.

=== Iraq ===
In 2020, the Iraqi Post released a set of eight commemorative stamps to honor the Christian churches in the country, the set included a photograph of the Baghdad Seventh-day Adventist Church.

== Health food ==
Seventh-day Adventists invented corn flakes and launched the worldwide breakfast cereal business in 1894. Working in an Adventist Church owned hospital in Battle Creek Michigan, two brothers launched what would become Kelloggs, a business that was quickly copied by others, notably C. W. Post. The church directly owns or has owned many food factories manufacturing cereals, meat analogues, dairy alternatives, and other health oriented products. The Seventh-day Adventist Church owned Sanitarium Health and Wellbeing Company continues to be a major producer of breakfast cereals and dairy alternatives like So Good (soy beverage) based in Australia and New Zealand with international sales and subsidiaries.

== Longevity research ==
The Adventist dominated community of Loma Linda, California was identified as a "Blue Zone" when research showed that members of the church live on average as much as 10 years longer than the typical American. The extraordinary longevity of Seventh-day Adventists has been linked to a combination of factors. Adventists encourage abstinence from tobacco, alcohol, and illegal drugs, encourage regular exercise and a vegetarian plant based diet, and practice regular fellowship with like minded Christians and a strong faith in God. Longevity and health among Adventists has been scientifically studied since the 1950s with some of these studies collectively referred to as Adventist Health Studies.

== See also ==
- List of Seventh-day Adventists
- Seventh-day Adventist Church
- Christian pop culture
- Cultural depictions of Jesus
