= List of fictional professors =

This is a list of professors appearing throughout fiction.

== Literature ==
Novel or literary work	Author	Fictional professor	Study
Altered States	Paddy Chayefsky	Professor Eddie Jessup	Psychology/parapsychology
At the Mountains of Madness	H. P. Lovecraft	Professor William Dyer	Geology
Bourne series	multiple	Professor Jason Bourne; Professor Dominic Specter	Linguistics; Unknown
Captain Underpants	Dav Pilkey	Professor Pippy Peepee Poopypants	Science
The Case of the Gilded Fly	Edmund Crispin	Professor Gervase Fen	English language and literature
The Chronicles of Narnia	C. S. Lewis	Professor Digory Kirke	History
Discworld	Terry Pratchett	Professor Rincewind	
Doomsday Book	Connie Willis	Professor James Dunworthy	Jistory
Dracula	Bram Stoker	Professor Abraham Van Helsing	Several fields
Exit to Eden	Anne Rice	Professor Collins	
Foundation series	Isaac Asimov	Professor Hari Seldon; Professor Dors Venabili; Professor Yugo Amaryl	Mathematics and psychohistory History; Mathematics and psychohistory
Frankenstein	Mary Shelley	Professor Krempe; Professor Waldman	Natural philosophy, science chemistry
Goosebumps series	R. L. Stine	Professor Eric Crane; Professor Greenwell; Professor Krupnik; Professor Leo Matz; Professor Shock; Professor Y	
Harry Potter series	J. K. Rowling	Professor Cuthbert Binns; Professor Charity Burbage; Professor Alecto Carrow; Professor Amycus Carrow; Professor Albus Percival Wulfric Brian Dumbledore; Professor Filius Flitwick; Professor Firenze; Professor Gilderoy Lockhart; Professor Neville Longbottom; Professor Remus Lupin; Professor Minerva McGonagall "Professor Alastor Moody"; Professor Quirinus Quirrell; Professor Horace Slughorn; Professor Severus Snape; Professor Pomona Sprout; Professor Sybill Trelawney; Professor Dolores Jane Umbridge; Professor Septima Vector	History of Magic; Muggle studies Muggle studies Dark Arts; Transfiguration, later Headmaster; Charms; Divination; Defense Against the Dark Arts; Herbology; Defense Against the Dark Arts; Transfiguration, later Headmistress; Defense Against the Dark Arts; Muggle studies, later Defense Against the Dark Arts; Astronomy; Potions; Potions, later Defense Against the Dark Arts, later Headmaster; Herbology; Divination; Defense Against the Dark Arts, later Headmistress; Arithmancy
Journey to the Center of the Earth	Jules Verne	Professor Otto Liedenbrock	Geology
The Paper Chase	John Jay Osborn, Jr.	Professor Charles Kingsfield	Law
Pnin	Vladimir Nabokov	Professor Timofey Pavlovich Pnin	Linguistics
Professor Branestawm series	Norman Hunter	Professor Theophilus Branestawm	Several fields
Professor Challenger series	Arthur Conan Doyle	Professor George Edward Challenger	Zoology
Professor Shonku series	Satyajit Ray	Professor Shonku	Physics
Ravelstein	Saul Bellow	Professor Abe Ravelstein; Professor Felix Davarr; Professor Radu Grielescu; Professor Rakhmiel Kogon; Professor Morris Herbst	Political philosophy, literary translation, classics Political philosophy, philosophy of history, classics History of religion, philosophy of religion, political history
Robert Langdon series	Dan Brown	Professor Robert Langdon	Symbology
A Series of Unfortunate Events	Lemony Snicket	Professor Fletcher	
Sherlock Holmes Series	Arthur Conan Doyle	Professor James Moriarty	Mathematics
Superstitious	R. L. Stine	Professor Liam O'Connor	Folklore
The Space Trilogy	C. S. Lewis	Professor Elwin Ransom	Philology
Twenty Thousand Leagues Under the Seas	Jules Verne	Professor Pierre Aronnax	Natural history
Wicked	Gregory Maguire	Doctor Dillamond	

== Film ==
Film	Portrayer	Fictional professor	Study
The Absent-Minded Professor (Flubber)	Fred MacMurray/Robin Williams	Professor Philip/Ned Brainard	Physical chemistry
Accepted (2006)	Lewis Black	Dr. Ben Lewis	Philosophy
Admission (2013)	Michael Sheen; Sonya Walger; Christopher Evan Welch	Dr. Mark Nathan; Helen; Brandt	English literature English literature, with a focus on Modernism and Virginia Woolf; English literature
Austenland	JJ Feild	Henry Nobly	History
Arlington Road	Jeff Bridges	Professor Michael Faraday	History
Charly	Leon Janney	Professor Richard Nemur	Psychology
Cheers for Miss Bishop	Martha Scott	Professor Ella Bishop	English
Clue	Christopher Lloyd	Professor Plum	Psychiatry
Creepshow	Hal Holbrook; Fritz Weaver	Professor Henry Northrup; Professor Dexter Stanley	English; Zoology
Creepshow 3	Emmet McGuire	Professor Dayton	
The Da Vinci Code; Angels & Demons; Inferno	Tom Hanks	Professor Robert Langdon	Symbology
The Day the Earth Stood Still (1951)	Sam Jaffe	Professor Jacob Barnhardt	Biological altruism
Dead Poets Society	Robin Williams	Professor John Keating	English literature
Diamonds Are Forever	Joseph Furst	Professor Metz	Laser science
Doraemon: Nobita and the Island of Miracles—Animal Adventure	Atsuko Tanaka (voice)	Professor Kelly	Biology
Doraemon: Nobita and the Steel Troops; Doraemon: Nobita and the New Steel Troops—Winged Angels (remake)	Kazuo Kumakura (voice); Tadashi Nakamura (voice)	Professor; Dr. God (remake)	Robotrology
Doraemon: Nobita and the Tin Labyrinth	Masashi Hirose (voice); Kazuhiko Kishino (voice)	Professors	Robotrology
Doraemon: Nobita and the Island of Miracles—Animal Adventure	Atsuko Tanaka (voice)	Professor Kelly	Biology
Doraemon: Nobita's Chronicle of the Moon Exploration	Yuya Yagira (voice)	Dr. Godal	Biology
Doraemon: Nobita's Great Adventure into the Underworld; Doraemon: Nobita's New Great Adventure into the Underworld (remake)	Tadashi Nakamura (voice); Junichi Koumoto (voice)	Professor Mangetsu	Demonology
Doraemon: Nobita's Sky Utopia	Ryūsei Nakao (voice)	Dr. Ray	Physical psychology
Doraemon the Movie 2017: Great Adventure in the Antarctic Kachi Kochi	Daisuke Namikawa (voice)	Professor Hyakkoi	Earth science
Exit to Eden	John Schneider	Professor Collins	
The Fearless Vampire Killers	Jack MacGowran	Professor Abronsius	Vampirology
Ghostbusters	Harold Ramis; Dan Aykroyd; Bill Murray	Dr. Egon Spengler; Dr. Ray Stantz; Dr. Peter Venkman	Parapsychology parapsychology Psychology and parapsychology
Goosebumps (2015)	John Deifer	Professor Shock	
The Great Mouse Detective	Vincent Price (voice)	Professor Padraic Ratigan	
Harry Potter series	Richard Harris / Michael Gambon; Warwick Davis; Kenneth Branagh; David Thewlis; Maggie Smith; Brendan Gleeson; Ian Hart; Alan Rickman; Jim Broadbent; Miriam Margolyes; Emma Thompson; Imelda Staunton	Professor Albus Dumbledore; Professor Filius Flitwick; Professor Gilderoy Lockhart; Professor Remus Lupin; Professor Minerva McGonagall "Professor Alastor Moody"; Professor Quirinus Quirrell; Professor Severus Snape; Professor Horace E.F. Slughorn; Professor Pomona Sprout; Professor Sybill Trelawney; Professor Dolores Jane Umbridge	Transfiguration, later Headmaster; Charms; Defense Against the Dark Arts; Defense Against the Dark Arts; Transfiguration; Defense Against the Dark Arts; Defense Against the Dark Arts; Potions, later Defense Against the Dark Arts; Potions; Herbology; Divination; Defense Against the Dark Arts, later Headmistress
Higher Learning	Laurence Fishburne	Professor Maurice Phipps	Political science
Indiana Jones series	Harrison Ford; Sean Connery	Dr. Henry "Indiana" Jones, Jr. Professor Henry Jones, Sr.	Archaeology; Medieval literature
Jumanji series	Jack Black; Bobby Cannavale	Professor Sheldon "Shelly" Oberon; Professor Van Pelt	Archaeology, cartography, geometry, paleontology Archaeology
Knowing	Nicolas Cage	Professor Jonathan "John" Koestler	Astrophysics
The Ladykillers	Tom Hanks	Professor Goldthwaite Higginson Dorr	Latin, philology, and classics
Liberal Arts (2012)	Richard Jenkins; Allison Janney	Dr. Peter Hoberg; Dr. Judith Fairfield	American literature Romantic literature
The Life of David Gale	Kevin Spacey	Professor David Gale	Philosophy
Maggie's Plan (2015)	Ethan Hawke; Julianne Moore	Dr. John Harding; Dr. Georgette Harding	Anthropology
Mary Shelley's Frankenstein	John Cleese	Professor Waldman	Medicine
The Mirror Has Two Faces (1996)	Barbra Streisand	Professor Rose Morgan	English literature
My Fair Lady	Rex Harrison	Professor Henry Higgins	Phonetics
The Nutty Professor	Eddie Murphy	Professor Sherman Klump	Biology
The Paper Chase	John Houseman	Professor Charles Kingsfield	Law
The Savages (2007)	Philip Seymour Hoffman	Professor Jon Savage	Theatre
A Serious Man (2009)	Michael Stuhlbarg	Dr. Lawrence "Larry" Gopnik	Physics
A Single Man	Colin Firth	Professor George Falconer	English literature
Some Kind of Beautiful (2014)	Pierce Brosnan	Dr. Richard Haig	English literature
Spider-Man 2	Dylan Baker	Dr. Curtis Connors	Physics
Spider-Man: Into the Spider-Verse	Kathryn Hahn	Dr. Olivia Octavius	Physics
Still Alice (2014)	Julianne Moore	Professor Alice Howland	Linguistics
Tarzan (1999)	Nigel Hawthorne	Professor Archimedes Q. Porter	Natural history
Urban Legend (1998)	Robert Englund	Professor William Wexler	Folklore
The Visitor (2007)	Richard Jenkins	Professor Walter Vale	Economics
The Whale (2022)	Brendan Fraser	Charlie	Literature
Wit (2001)	Emma Thompson	Professor Vivian Bearing	English literature
The Wizard of Oz	Frank Morgan	Professor Marvel	None (fraudulent)
Wonder Boys (2000)	Michael Douglas	Professor Grady Tripp	Creative writing
X-Men series	Patrick Stewart	Professor Charles Xavier	Several fields

== Television ==
Television show	Portrayer	Fictional professor	Study
3rd Rock from the Sun	Jane Curtin; John Lithgow	Dr. Mary Margaret Albright, Ph.D; Dr. Richard "Dick" Solomon	Anthropology; Physics
The Adventures of Jimmy Neutron	Tim Curry (voice)	Professor Finbarr Calamitous	Science
The Aquabats! Super Show! / The Aquabats	Parker Jacobs	Professor Monty Corndog	Science
Aquí no hay quien viva	Llum Barrera	Carmen Villanueva	Unknown
Bagpuss	Oliver Postgate (voice)	Professor Yaffle (Augustus Barclay Yaffle)	Unknown
Being Human	Lyndsey Marshal	Professor Lucy Jaggat	Science
BoJack Horseman	Will Arnett (voice)	Professor BoJack Horseman	Theater
Boy Meets World	William Daniels	Mr. George Hamilton Feeny	Archaeology/physics
Buffy the Vampire Slayer	Lindsay Crouse	Professor Maggie Walsh	psychology
Californication	David Duchovny	Professor Hank Moody	Creative writing
Community	Betty White; Malcolm McDowell; John Oliver; Kevin Corrigan; Jonathan Banks; Michael K. Williams; Lauren Stamile; John Michael Higgins; Joel McHale	Professor June Bauer; Professor Noel Cornwallis; Dr. Ian Duncan; Professor Sean Garrity; Professor Buzz Hickey; Dr. Marshall Kane; Professor Michelle Slater; Professor Eustice Whitman; Professor Jeff Winger	Anthropology; History; Psychology; Theater; Criminology; Biology; Statistics; Accounting; Law
Cory in the House	Mary Chris Wall; Paul Rogan; Amy Tolsky	Professor Suzane Bushwick; Professor Uriah Dobbs; Dr. Vanderslyce	Psychology; Science; Unknown
Criminal Minds	Jeanne Tripplehorn	Dr. Alex Blake	Linguistics
Deutschland 83	Alexander Beyer	Professor Tobias Tischbier	Law
Doctor Who	Denis Carey; Derek Jacobi; Alex Kingston; Trevor Baxter; Jack Watling	Professor Urban Chronotis; Professor Yana; Professor River Song; Professor George Litefoot; Professor Edward Travers	Chronology; Endtime gravity Mechanics; Archaeology; Forensic pathology Anthropology
Falling Skies	Noah Wyle	Professor Tom Mason	History
Felix the Cat	Jack Mercer (voice)	The Professor	Science
The Fresh Prince of Bel-Air	Janet Hubert-Whitten / Daphne Maxwell Reid	Professor Vivian Banks	African-American history
Friends	David Schwimmer	Ross Eustace Geller, Ph.D	Paleontology
Futurama	Billy West (voice)	Professor Hubert J. Farnsworth	Science
Galileo	Masaharu Fukuyama	Professor Manabu Yukawa	Physics
Game On	George Hu	Professor Bu	Physics
Ghost Whisperer	Jay Mohr; Jamie Kennedy; Bruce Davison	Professor Rick Payne; Professor Eli James; Professor Josh Bedford	Paranormal studies Psychology; Unknown
Gilligan's Island	Russell Johnson	Professor Roy Hinkley, Ph.D.	Science
Gilmore Girls	Michael York; Edward Herrmann	Professor Asher Fleming; Mr. Richard Gilmore	Unknown; Economics
The Good Place	William Jackson Harper	Professor Chidi Anagonye	Ethics
Heroes	Sendhil Ramamurthy	Professor Mohinder Suresh	Genetics
How I Met Your Mother	Josh Radnor	Professor Ted Mosby	Architecture
Instinct	Alan Cumming	Professor Dylan Reinhart	Abnormal Psychology Behavioral Science
Kim Possible	Patton Oswalt (voice); John DiMaggio (voice)	Professor Dementor; Dr. Drakken	Science
Law & Order	Dianne Wiest	Nora Lewin	Law
The Lost Symbol	Ashley Zukerman	Professor Robert Langdon	Symbology
The Magic School Bus Rides Again	Lily Tomlin (voice)	Professor Valerie Felicity Frizzle, PhD	Science
Nanny and the Professor	Richard Long	Professor Harold Everett	Mathematics
Neighbours	Andrew Clarke	Professor Alexandr Isiovich "Alex" Kinski	Unknown
Numb3rs	David Krumholtz; Peter MacNicol; Navi Rawat	Dr. Charles Edward "Charlie" Eppes; Dr. Lawrence "Larry" Fleinhardt; Dr. Amita Ramanujan	Mathematics; Physics; Mathematics
One Life to Live	unknown	Dr. Stephen Haver	Unknown
The Order	Sam Trammell	Eric Clarke	Ethics
The Paper Chase	John Houseman	Professor Charles Kingsfield	Law
Perception	Eric McCormack	Dr. Daniel Pierce	Neuroscience
Phineas and Ferb	Jennifer Grey (voice)	Dr. Gevaarlijk	Evil science
Pokémon	Dan Green unknown Kayzie Rogers; Stan Hart and Billy Beach; Jimmy Zoppi	Professor Birch; Professor Elm; Professor Felina Ivy; Professor Samuel Oak; Professor Rowan; Professor Juniper; Professor Sycamore; Professor Kukui	Pokémon habitats Pokémon breeding Pokémon; Pokémon behavior Pokémon evolution
The Powerpuff Girls	Tom Kane (voice)	Professor Utonium	Science
Primeval	Douglas Henshall	Professor Nick Cutter	Unknown
Professor Balthazar	N/A	Professor Balthazar	Unknown
Puppet History	Shane Madej (voice)	Professor McNasty	history
Quatermass (various)	(various)	Professor Bernard Quatermass	Space exploration
Sabrina, the Teenage Witch	Beth Broderick	Professor Zelda Spellman	Quantum physics
Science Court	H. Jon Benjamin (voice)	Professor Nick Parsons	Science
The Secret Show	Rob Rackstraw (voice)	Professor Professor	Science
The Simpsons	Hank Azaria (voice)	Professor John Frink Jr.	Science
Sliders	John Rhys-Davies	Professor Maximillian P. Arturo	Cosmology and ontology
Star Trek: The Next Generation	Brent Spiner	Lucasian Professor Data	Physics
The Twilight Zone (1959)	Robert Emhardt; John McIntire; Malcolm Atterbury; Oscar Beregi, Jr. Donald Pleasence; Richard Long; Milton Parsons; Kevin McCarthy; Edgar Stehli; Russell Johnson; Robert Boon; Oscar Beregi, Jr.	Professor Ackerman; Professor A. Daemon; Professor Eliot; Professor Farwell; Professor Ellis Fowler; Professor Sigmund Friend; Professor Gilbert; Professor Walter Jameson; Professor Samuel Kittridge; Professor Manion; Professor Holger Nielsen; Professor Karl Werner	Unknown; Potions; None; Chemistry and physics English literature Psychiatry; Time travel History; Chemistry; Time travel Unknown; Unknown
The Twilight Zone (1985)	Sherman Hemsley; John Carradine	Professor Sam; Professor Alex Stottel	Mathematics; Unknown
Veronica Mars	Patrick Fabian	Professor Hank Landry	Criminology
A Very Peculiar Practice	Timothy West	Professor Furie	
The West Wing	Martin Sheen	President Josiah Bartlet	Economics
WordGirl	unknown Tom Kenny (voice) unknown	Professor Steven Boxleitner, Ph.D., MOMA, M&A, LMNOP; Dr. Two-Brains; Professor James Doohickey	Science; Science; Technology

== Comics ==
Comic	Fictional professor	Study
The Adventures of Tintin	Professor Cuthbert Calculus	Nuclear and theoretical physics, planetary astronomy, calculus
DC Comics	Dr Harleen Quinzel/Harley Quinn; Dr. Jonathan Crane/Scarecrow; Professor Ray Palmer/Atom; Professor Martin Stein/Firestorm; Abin Sur	Psychiatry; Psychiatry; Physics; Physics; History
Jommeke	Professor Jeremias Gobelijn	Self-declared "professor in everything"
Marvel Comics	Dr. Curtis Connors; Dr. John Grey; Dr. Henry Philip "Hank" McCoy/The Beast; Professor Piotr Phobos; Dr. Henry "Hank" Pym; Dr. Reed Richards; Professor Miles Warren/Jackal; Professor Charles Francis Xavier	Herpetology; History; Biochemistry/genetics; Unknown; Entomology, theoretical physics, and chemistry Several fields Biology; Genetics
The Adventures of Nero	Adhemar	Philology, trigonometry, nuclear physics, dynamics, philosophy, biology, ornithology and botany
Spike and Suzy	Professor Barabas	Time travel, inventions
Doctor Who	Professor Bernice Summerfield	Archaeology

== Other ==
Creator	Fictional professor	Study
Akihiro Hino	Professor Hershel Layton	Archaeology
John William Spaeth, Jr.	Professor Josiah S. Carberry	Psychoceramics
Unknown	Professor Bernard Weiss	Linguistics
BethAnn McLaughlin	@Sciencing_Bi	Anthropology
Max Wall	Professor Wallofski	Music hall comedian
