= 26th Writers Guild of America Awards =

26th WGA Awards
- Date: 1974
- Organized by: Writers Guild of America, East and the Writers Guild of America, West

The 26th Writers Guild of America Awards honored the best film writers and television writers of 1973. Winners were announced in 1974.

== Winners and nominees ==
=== Film ===
Winners are listed first highlighted in boldface.

**Best Drama Written Directly for the Screen**: **Save the Tiger, Written by Steve Shagan**; Mean Streets, Screenplay by Martin Scorsese and Mardik Martin; Story by Martin Scorsese; Payday, Written by Don Carpenter; The Sting, Written by David S. Ward; The Way We Were, Written by Arthur Laurents	**Best Comedy Written Directly for the Screen**: **A Touch of Class, Screenplay by Melvin Frank and Jack Rose; Story by Marvin Frank**; American Graffiti, Written by George Lucas, Gloria Katz and Willard Huyck; Blume in Love, Written by Paul Mazursky; Sleeper, Written by Woody Allen and Marshall Brickman; Slither, Written by W.D. Richter
**Best Drama Adapted from Another Medium**: **Serpico, Screenplay by Waldo Salt and Norman Wexler; Based on the book by Peter Maas**; Cinderella Liberty, Screenplay by Darryl Ponicsan; Based on his novel; The Exorcist, Screenplay by William Peter Blatty; Based on his novel; The Last Detail, Screenplay by Robert Towne; Based on the novel by Darryl Ponicsan; The Paper Chase, Screenplay by James Bridges; Based on the novel by John Jay Osborn Jr.	**Best Comedy Adapted from Another Medium**: **Paper Moon, Screenplay by Alvin Sargent; Based on the novel by Joe David Brown**; 40 Carats, Screenplay by Leonard Gershe; Based on the play by Pierre Barillet and Jean-Pierre Gredy; Godspell, Screenplay by David Greene and John-Michael Tebelak; Based on the play by John-Michael Tebelak

=== Television ===
**Episodic Comedy**: **"Walter's Problem: Part 1 & 2" – Maude (CBS) – Bob Weiskopf and Bob Schiller**; "Tuttle" – M*A*S*H (CBS) – Bruce Shelly and David Ketchum; "Sometimes You Hear the Bullet" – M*A*S*H (CBS) – Carl Kleinschmitt; "Radar's Report" – M*A*S*H (CBS) – Laurence Marks and Sheldon Keller; "The Incubator" – M*A*S*H (CBS) – Larry Gelbart and Laurence Marks; "Carry On, Hawkeye" – M*A*S*H (CBS) – Larry Gelbart, Laurence Marks and Bernard Dilbert; "The Lars Affair" – The Mary Tyler Moore Show (CBS) – Ed Weinberg	**Episodic Drama**: **"Voyage of Discovery" – The Starlost (Syndicated) – Harlan Ellison**; "This Golden Land" – Gunsmoke (CBS) – Hal Sitowitz; "A Necessary End" – Marcus Welby, M.D. (ABC) – Norman Hudis; "The House of Hyde Street" – The Streets of San Francisco (ABC) – John Wilder and Cliff Osmond; "The Thanksgiving Story" – The Waltons (CBS) – Joanna Lee and Earl Hamner Jr.; "The Roots" – The Waltons (CBS) – Sheldon Stark; "The Odyssey" – The Waltons (CBS) – Joanna Lee; "The Easter Story" – The Waltons (CBS) – John McGreevey and Earl Jamner Jr.
**Daytime Serials**: **Search for Tomorrow (CBS) – Ralph Ellis and Eugenie Hunt**; Love Is a Many Splendored Thing (CBS) – Ann Marcus, Daniel Gregory Browne and Jerry Adelman; Love of Live (CBS) – Claire Labine and Paul Avila Mayer	**Best Written Variety Script**: **Lily – Bob Illes, Rosalyn Drexler, Lorne Michaels, Richard Pryor, Jim Rusk, Herbert Sargent, James R. Stein, Lily Tomlin, Jane Wagner, George Yanok, Ann Elder, Karyl Miller and Rod Warren**

=== Special awards ===
Laurel Award for Screenwriting Achievement

**Paddy Chayefsky**

Valentine Davies Award

**Philip Dunne & Ray Bradbury**

Morgan Cox Award

**James R. Webb**
