= Paper Chase =

Paper Chase or Paperchase may refer to:

- Paper Chase (game), a racing game
- Paperchase, a UK premium stationery retailer operating internationally.
- The Paper Chase, a 1966 memoir by Hal Porter

== Fiction ==
- The Paper Chase (Symons novel), a 1956 novel by Julian Symons
- The Paper Chase (Osborn novel), a 1971 novel by John Jay Osborn Jr.
  - The Paper Chase (film), a 1973 film based on Osborn's novel
  - The Paper Chase (TV series), a 1978-1986 series based on the novel and film
- Paper Chase, a 1964 novel by Mark Saxton
- Paper Chase, a 1988 spy novel by William Garner
- The Confessions of Mycroft Holmes: A Paper Chase (UK title: The Paperchase), a 2001 novel by Marcel Theroux

Television episodes

- "Paper Chase" (77 Sunset Strip)
- "Paper Chase" (The Bill)
- "Paper Chase" (Blue Heelers)
- "The Paper Chase" (Danger Man)
- "The Paper Chase" (Edgemont)
- "Paper Chase" (Family Ties)
- "The Paper Chase" (Felicity)
- "Paper Chase" (Home to Roost)
- "The Paper Chase" (The Paper Chase)
- "The Paper Chase!" (The Raccoons)
- "Paper Chase" (The Saint)
- "Paper Chase" (Step by Step)
- "Paperchase", an episode of The Wind in the Willows

== Music ==
- The Paper Chase (band), an American alternative rock band
- "Paper Chase", a song by The Academy Is... from Fast Times at Barrington High
- "Paper Chase", a song by Jay-Z from Vol. 2... Hard Knock Life
- "Paper Chase", a song by Richard Harris from A Tramp Shining
- "Paperchase", a song by Anthony Phillips from Wise After the Event
- "Paperchase", a song by Do or Die from Picture This
- "Paperchase", a song by Paul Weller from Sonik Kicks
