= Marc Cavell (actor) =

American actor

- Marc Cavel in Alfred Hitchcock Presents 1960
- Born: Marc Edward Cavell; June 28, 1939
- Died: February 29, 2004 (aged 64)
- Years active: 1952–1978

Marc Edward Cavell (June 28, 1939 – February 29, 2004) was an American actor and singer. He performed in twenty films from 1952 to 1974. Television guest-credits include Peter Gunn, Alfred Hitchcock Presents, Gunsmoke and The Twilight Zone.

== Early years ==
Cavell was born Maurice Edward Cavell, the son of Italian immigrant Rudolph Cavell, who had a career as a boxer and wrestler. His father emigrated to the United States from Italy as Rodolfo Cavazzale.

== Filmography ==
Film
Year	Title	Role	Notes
1952	Thunder in the East	Moti Lal	
1953	The Man from the Alamo	Carlos	
1955	Desert Sands	Young Boy El Zanel	Uncredited
1956	Diane	Piero	
1959	The Purple Gang	Henry Abel "Hank" Smith	
1960	The Big Night	Jerry	
1961	Pocketful of Miracles	Young Reporter	Uncredited
1962	Hemingway's Adventures of a Young Man	Eddy Boulton	
1963	Operation Bikini	Paul	
1963	Captain Newman, M.D.	Patient In Ward	Uncredited
1964	Young Fury	Pancho	
1965	The Greatest Story Ever Told	Bad Thief On Cross	Uncredited
1965	Bus Riley's Back in Town	Egg Foo	
1966	The Wild Angels	"Frankenstein"	
1967	Devil's Angels	Billy "The Kid"	
1967	The Love-Ins	Mario	
1967	Cool Hand Luke	"Rabbitt"	
1974	California Split	California Club Poker Player	

TV
Year	Title	Role	Notes
1958	Adventures of Superman	Pepe	Season 6 Episode 11: "The Brainy Burro"
1959	Peter Gunn	"Clip"	Season 2 Episode 6
1960	Alfred Hitchcock Presents	The Bellhop	Season 5 Episode 15: "Man from the South"
1960	The Twilight Zone	Freeman	Season 1 Episode 19: "The Purple Testament"
1960	Thriller (American TV series)	Young Tony uncredited	Season 1 Episode 6
1962	The Alfred Hitchcock Hour	Freddy Drew, the Young Man	Season 1 Episode 4: "I Saw the Whole Thing"
1963	The Alfred Hitchcock Hour	Alf Colton	Season 1 Episode 22: "Diagnosis: Danger"
1963	Pistols 'n' Petticoats	Grey Hawk	
1966	Batman	Fangs	Episodes 11 and 12
1967	Gunsmoke	Outlaw Arky	“Muley” (Season 12 Episode 18)
1978	The Paper Chase	Messenger	Season 1 Episode 11: "The Sorcerer's Apprentice"
1978	Vega$	Charlie	Season 1 Episode 10:"Second Stanza" (final appearance)
