= The Man Who Would Be King (disambiguation) =

"The Man Who Would Be King" is an 1888 short story by Rudyard Kipling concerning two ambitious British ex-soldiers.

The Man Who Would Be King may also refer to:

- The Man Who Would Be King (film), a 1975 film adaptation of the Kipling story

== Literature ==
- The Man Who Would Be King, a novelization of the 1975 film by Michael Hardwick
- Yul: The Man Who Would Be King, a 1989 memoir of Yul Brynner, written by his son Rock Brynner
- The Man Who Would Be King: The Life of Philippe D'Orleans, Regent of France, a 1997 book by Christine Pevitt
- The Man Who Would Be King: The First American in Afghanistan, a 2005 book by Ben Macintyre
- Otto Preminger: The Man Who Would Be King, a 2007 book by Foster Hirsch
- Donald Trump, The Man Who Would Be King, a 2016 biography by Darwin Porter with Danforth Prince
- The Man Who Would Be King: Mohammed bin Salman and the Transformation of Saudi Arabia, a 2025 book by Karen Elliott House

== Music ==
- "The Man Who Would Be King", a song by The Libertines on their album The Libertines
- "The Man Who Would Be King", a song by Neal Morse on his eponymous solo album Neal Morse
- "The Man Who Would Be King", a song by Dio on their album Master of the Moon
- "The Man Who Would Be King", a song by Iron Maiden on their album The Final Frontier

== Television ==
- "The Man Who Would Be King", an episode of the American series Suspense (S3E08, 17 October 1950)
- "The Man Who Would Be King", an episode of the American series The Paper Chase (S1E02, 19 September 1978)
- "The Man Who Would Be King" (Supernatural), an episode of the American series Supernatural (S6E20, 6 May 2011)
- "Orion: The Man Who Would Be King", an episode of the British series Storyville (16 November 2015)

== See also ==
- The Man Who Would Be Queen, a 2003 book by J. Michael Bailey
- The Man Who Would Be Polka King, a 2009 documentary about Jan Lewan, a Polish-American songwriter and polka band leader
- A Man Who Would be King, a 2017 novel about the Duke of Buckingham by J. P. Reedman
- The Kid Who Would Be King, a 2019 urban fantasy action-adventure film
