= The Sowell Family Collection in Literature, Community, and the Natural World =

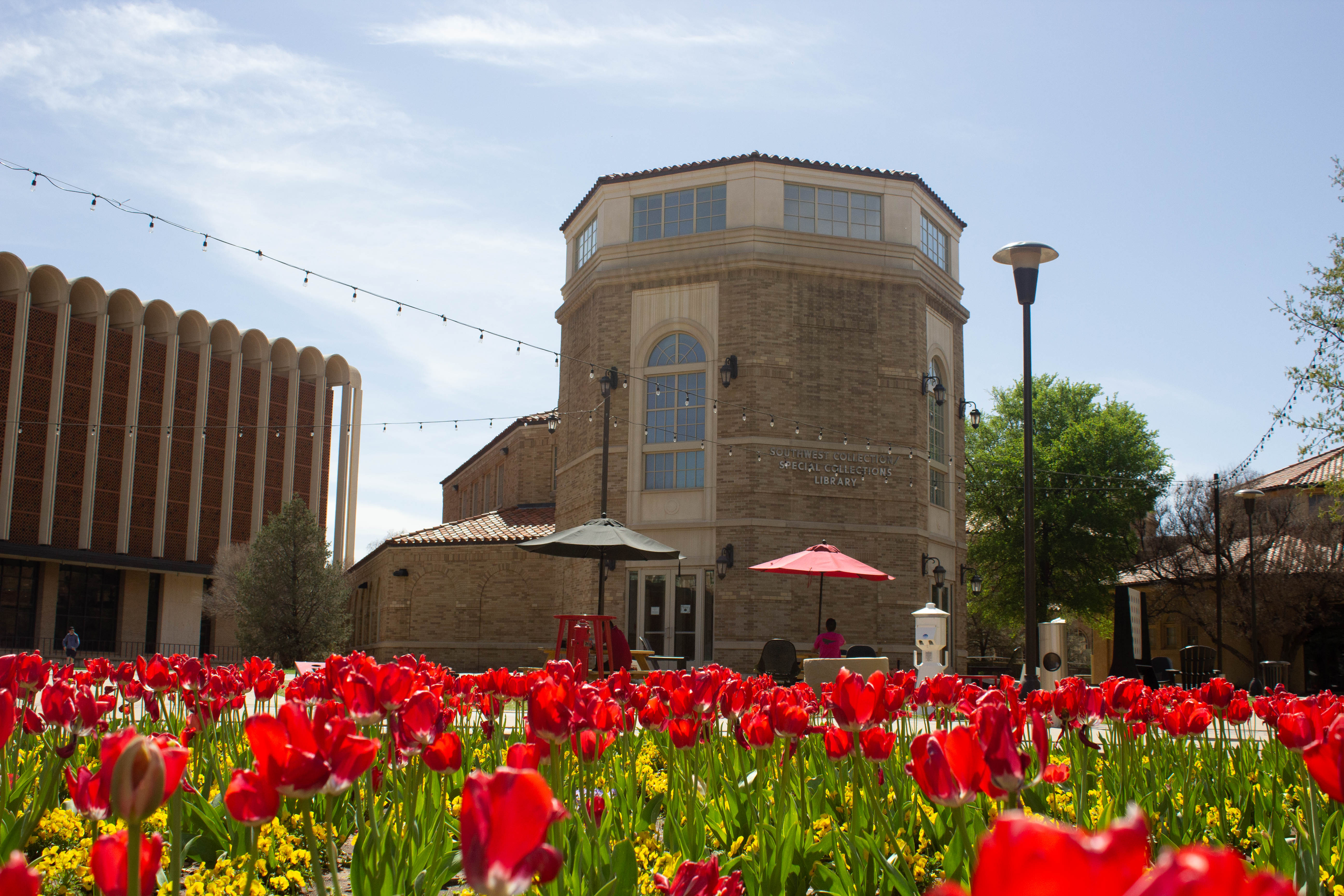
Texas Tech's Southwest Collection/Special Collections Library, home of the James Sowell Family Collection in Literature, Community and the Natural World

The Sowell Family Collection in Literature, Community, and the Natural World, housed in Texas Tech University's Southwest Collection/Special Collections Library in Lubbock, Texas, preserves the journals, drafts, correspondence, ephemera, born-digital and audio visual media of 28 American writers on the natural world. Selected portions of the collection may be viewed online and in person. According to a census of Collection finding aids available from the Texas Archival Resources Online, there are currently around 1340 linear feet of processed materials in the Collection, including ephemera documenting its own history.

== History ==
Texas Tech University's Sowell Family Collection in Literature, Community, and the Natural World began with discussions with Barry Lopez and other contributors in 1998. The first papers were acquired and processed in 2000, and as early as 2001 Texas Tech Libraries hosted a reading by a Sowell Collection author. The Collection has been open to researchers since at least 2007, and open to the public since 2012. The University hosts an annual conference for the Collection. Underwritten by former Texas Tech University Regent James Sowell, the Collection holds papers, manuscripts, photography, and art from 28 creators, and continues to acquire materials from new and existing writers. Acquisitions from the 2020s include the papers of Stephen Graham Jones, J. Drew Lanham, and Barbara Ras. The authors in the collection have received recognitions such as The National Book Award and include MacArthur and Stegner Fellows. Many of the Collection's early writers have ties to the Orion Society and attended Orion magazine's seminal Fire & Grit conference in June 1999. Additionally, the Collection's supporters, users, and contributors over the years have included members of the Association for the Study of Literature and the Environment and the Western Literature Association, among other organizations.

== Collection writers ==
- Rick Bass
- Lisa Couturier
- Max Crawford
- David James Duncan
- Gretel Ehrlich
- Paul Gruchow
- Paul Hawken
- Clyde Jones
- Stephen Graham Jones
- William Kittredge
- Michael Koepf
- John Lane
- J. Drew Lanham
- Barry Lopez
- Bill McKibben
- Susan Brind Morrow
- Gary Paul Nabhan
- Howard Norman
- Andrea Peacock
- Doug Peacock
- Robert Michael Pyle
- David Quammen
- Barbara Ras
- Marc Reisner
- Pattiann Rogers
- Sandra Scofield
- Annick Smith
- Ro Wauer

== Supporting papers and collections ==
These papers and collections housed at Texas Tech are also related to The Sowell Family Collection in Literature, Community, and the Natural World by affinity or history but not part of its core holdings:

- Susan Tomlinson Papers
- Edward Abbey Papers
- Edward Hoagland Papers
- The Richard Rowland Comanche Pots Collection
- The Orion Society Audio Visual Collection Papers
- The Stephen J. Small Conservation Collection
