= The Purple Testament =

- The Twilight Zone episode
- Episode no.: Season 1 Episode 19
- Directed by: Richard L. Bare
- Written by: Rod Serling
- Production code: 173-3619
- Original air date: February 12, 1960

Guest appearances
- William Reynolds as Lt. Fitzgerald; Dick York as Captain Phil Riker; Barney Phillips as Captain E.L. Gunther; Warren Oates as Jeep Driver; Paul Mazursky as Orderly; Ron Masak as Harmonica Man; William Phipps as Sergeant; S. John Launer as Colonel; Marc Cavell as Freeman

Episode chronology
← Previous "The Last Flight"	Next → "Elegy"
- The Twilight Zone (1959 TV series, season 1)

"The Purple Testament" is the nineteenth episode of the American television anthology series The Twilight Zone. It is "the story of a man who can forecast death". It originally aired on February 12, 1960, on CBS. In 2003, a similar-themed story was told in the second revival, in the episode "Into the Light."

== Opening narration ==
Infantry platoon, U.S. Army, Philippine Islands, 1945. These are the faces of the young men who fight, as if some omniscient painter had mixed a tube of oils that were at one time earth brown, dust gray, blood red, beard black, and fear—yellow white, and these men were the models. For this is the province of combat, and these are the faces of war.

== Plot ==
William Fitzgerald ("Fitz"), a lieutenant serving in World War II, suddenly gains the mysterious ability to see who is about to die via a strange glow on the person's face. After correctly predicting several deaths, he tells his friend Captain Riker what he is able to see, but the Captain does not know whether to believe him. Riker consults with a doctor, Captain Gunther, who thinks it may be wise to conduct a few tests on the lieutenant. While Riker and Gunther are discussing this, Fitz is in the same hospital visiting one of his men, Smitty, who is supposed to pull through. But he sees the strange light on the soldier's face and knows his fate. After his premonition comes true, Fitz makes a scene in the hospital in front of Captains Gunther and Riker.

Back in camp, after Riker lays out plans for the next mission, Fitz reveals that he has seen the light on the captain's face. Though Riker insists it means nothing, that the two of them will share a drink after they return from battle, he nonetheless leaves behind some of his personal possessions - a few photographs and his wedding ring - before he goes into combat. In the camp, the men argue about the rumors of the lieutenant's predictions, but Riker tells all the soldiers there that there are no "mind readers" in the camp. Fitz, seeing the men's faces and realizing he could cause mutiny (and that none of them are fated to die), agrees with the captain.

In the ensuing battle, all return except for Riker, who is killed by a sniper. Captain Gunther brings news to Fitz that he is being sent back to division headquarters for some much-needed rest, but as the lieutenant gathers his gear, he catches his reflection in a mirror and sees the light on his own face. After this, Fitz becomes distant, as if resigned to fate. A jeep driver comes to pick Fitz up. The sergeant sends the two off, telling the driver to be careful as they go; Fitz then sees the light on the face of the jeep driver. They fail to completely check the area for land mines on the road ahead. As the soldiers are gathered around the camp at dusk, the sound of an explosion is heard in the distance.

== Closing narration ==
From William Shakespeare, Richard the Third, a small excerpt. The line reads, 'He has come to open the purple testament of bleeding war.' And for Lieutenant William Fitzgerald, A Company, First Platoon, the testament is closed. Lieutenant Fitzgerald has found the Twilight Zone.

(In fact, the quotation is from Richard II, not Richard III.)

== Production notes ==
Dean Stockwell was originally cast in the lead role but was unable to appear. He would later star in the similarly themed episode "A Quality of Mercy". The concept of seeing a light on the face of those who are about to die was readdressed in "Into the Light", an episode of the 2002 revival series. This is one of several episodes from the first season with its opening title sequence plastered over with the opening for the second season. This was done during the summer of 1961 as to help the season one shows fit in with the new look the show had taken during the following season.

Rod Serling quotes the Shakespearean source of the episode title in his closing narration: "He is come to open the purple testament of bleeding war." He claims the quote is from Richard III, but it actually comes from Richard II.

== Broadcast date controversy ==
On the same day as the screening of the episode, director Richard Bare and William Reynolds, then filming the TV series The Islanders, were in a plane crash, with one person on board the plane being killed in the crash. Reynolds claimed Rod Serling pulled the episode from its scheduled screening date, out of concern for the families of Reynolds and Bare. In his exhaustively researched 2008 book The Twilight Zone: Unlocking the Door to a Television Classic, Martin Grams concludes that the episode did indeed air as originally scheduled on February 12, 1960, despite Reynolds' statements.

== Sources ==
- Zicree, Marc Scott: The Twilight Zone Companion. Sillman-James Press, 1982 (second edition)
- DeVoe, Bill. (2008). Trivia from The Twilight Zone. Albany, GA: Bear Manor Media. ISBN 978-1-59393-136-0
- Grams, Martin. (2008). The Twilight Zone: Unlocking the Door to a Television Classic. Churchville, MD: OTR Publishing. ISBN 978-0-9703310-9-0
