= The River Why =

1983 novel by David James Duncan

- Author: David James Duncan
- Language: English
- Genre: Fiction
- Publisher: Sierra Club Books
- Publication date: 1983
- Publication place: United States
- Media type: Print (Hardback and paperback)
- Pages: 294 (First edition, hardback)
- ISBN: 0-87156-321-5 (20th Anniversary edition, hardback); ISBN 0-87156-321-5 (20th Anniversary edition, paperback); ISBN 0140070036 (First edition, hardback)
- OCLC: 8387325,12252172
- Followed by: The Brothers K

The River Why is a 1983 novel by David James Duncan. While it starts off as a fishing story, The River Why turns into the story of a young person struggling to come to grips with the modern world.

== Plot summary ==
A coming-of-age story narrated by Gus Orviston, a high school graduate and the oldest son in a fishing-crazed family. Frustrated with life in Portland, Oregon, and the constant bickering of his bait fishing mother (Ma) and tweed-wearing, fly-fishing father (H2O) over the proper way to fish, Gus moves to a small cabin in the foothills of the Oregon Coast Range. Once there he begins to follow an "ideal schedule" that has him doing nothing but eating, sleeping, and fishing. In the course of doing nothing but what he loves to do, he begins to notice the scars that humanity has inflicted on the river and forests he loves. Gus also goes through the traumatic event when he is fishing and finds and must transport a dead fisherman to shore, and through this experience he is able to realize how wrong his "ideal schedule" really is. As he wrestles with what to do, he begins to relate with the people in his neighborhood. He starts to regain his passion for life through his intense passion of the outdoors and fishing, but also through human contact. He also meets his new friend, though while rather eccentric, is also a brilliant thinker, helping Gus see the meaning in his life. Gus continues to grow and mature, mirroring the path to adulthood many experience, until he meets a young fisherwoman, Eddy. Although their relationship is unique, it is also a very true form of love that not only helps Gus to continue to grow into a man, but also teaches him to truly appreciate every aspect of his life. Gus is put to the test when Eddy hooks him a salmon, making him fight it all night up the river. Gus ultimately chooses her and the new life he has started to create for himself by releasing the fish when he finally catches it, mirroring man's quest for success, to only discover that true success is the happiness experienced by the abandonment of preconceived notions of success that are not applicable anymore to a growing life, entering into adulthood. The book ends with Gus completely growing up by confronting his parents with Eddy and forgiving them.

== Awards ==
Voted 35th best novel in the San Francisco Chronicle list of The 20th Century's 100 Best Books of the American West.

== 20th anniversary edition ==
In 2002, Sierra Club Books released a 20th Anniversary Edition that includes a new afterword by the author describing Thomas Mann's Buddenbrooks influence on him at the age of 16 and how this led him to a life of literature. Duncan also uses the afterword to describe the process that led to the writing of The River Why, and the difficulty finding a publisher. Throughout the piece Duncan speaks of political, religious, and environmental ideas that are the basis of The River Why, The Brothers K (1992, ISBN 0-553-37849-X), River Teeth (1996, ISBN 0-553-37827-9), My Story As Told By Water (2001, ISBN 1-57805-083-9), God Laughs and Plays: Churchless Sermons in Response to the Preachments of the Fundamentalist Right, (ISBN 0977717003) as well as other essays and published writings.

== Film and theatrical adaptation ==
The book is the basis of a The River Why (film) starring Zach Gilford, William Hurt and Amber Heard. The film was released to critics in April, 2010.

The novel was adapted for the stage by Book-It Repertory Theatre of Seattle and produced in early 2010.
