= Postage stamps and postal history of Norfolk Island =

1957 Norfolk Island postage stamp depicting Warder's Tower

The postage stamps and postal history of Norfolk Island depended on Australia until 1947, when the island, an Australian territory since 1914, received its own stamps and postal autonomy.

After the transfer of Christmas Island and Cocos (Keeling) Islands' philatelic and postal services to Australia Post, Norfolk had been the last Australian territory to be postally independent. Consequently, the stamps issued by Norfolk had no value in Australia, and those of Australia Post could not be used in the island.

Norfolk Island ceased having its own postal service and issuing postage stamps in July 2016. Australia Post continues to issue stamps inscribed "Norfolk Island, Australia".

== Before 1947 ==
The formal postal history of Norfolk began with the second penal settlement organised on the island between 1824 and 1855. The first post office opened in 1832.

The first postage stamps used there were sent by Van Diemen's Land, the colony administratively responsible for the settlement. Decided late 1853, the first stamps figuring Queen Victoria, worth sixteen pounds, travelled on the Lady Franklin. Part of them was lost when the prisoners aboard the ship mutinied and flew away. The second packet of stamps arrived finally to Norfolk and they were used between July 1854 and May 1855, when the penal colony was closed and all people evacuated. The stamps used in Norfolk can be distinguished by the number marked by the cancellation: "72".

Even if the island was repopulated in 1856 by migrants from the Pitcairn Islands, authorised by the United Kingdom, Norfolk received a postal service and postage stamps not before 1877. The British authorities asked New South Wales to provide them to Norfolk. However, the stamp stock was not regularly reconstituted until 1898, and, with no postage stamp, the "NORFOLK ISLAND" cancel stamp sent in 1892 was not used until 1898.

With the constitution of the Commonwealth of Australia, the stamps of Australia replaced those of New South Wales in 1913.

== After 1947 ==
=== First issues ===
Norfolk, then an external territory since 1914, asked for its own postage stamps in 1923, and again in 1937. The latter was accepted and the first issue was previewed for 1940. These postage stamps were designed and engraved by Frank Manley, printed and perforated eleven teeth per two centimeters. They represented Ball Bay and the "FOUNDED 1788" mention, starting year of the first penal settlement. The issue was cancelled when World War II began. They were later destroyed, but some stolen stamps and sheets that reached the philatelic market.

Finally, twelve stamps from half-penny to two shillings were issued on 10 June 1947. Manley's Ball Bay design was used, with a different perforation of fourteen.

To complete this series face values, a second of six stamps was issued on 10 June 1953 picturing human constructions of the island, from the Warder's Tower on the threepence and a half to the Blooding Bridge on the five shillings. Two of these stamps, the seven pence and a half and the eight and a half, were the first overprinted stamps of Norfolk to confront a change of postal rates.

On 8 June 1956, was issued the first commemorative stamp marking the centenary of the arrival of Pitcairners, the first permanent and non penal settlement on Norfolk. The second commemorative needed to overprint the Australian stamp for the 150 years of postal service in Australia picturing Isaac Nichols, the first postmaster of New South Wales. Worth four pence in Australia, it was overprinted five pence for use in Norfolk.

=== After 1960 ===
Starting 1960, the philatelic issues of Norfolk progressively were more numerous, with hiring of British printers in the 1970s.

In 1960, a new definitive stamp series began using the island's fauna and flora, completed with new values afterwards, and renew regularly. Other series circulated too picturing ships and captains of the Pacific Ocean history, like James Cook. A Christmas stamp had been issued every year, first by reusing the Australian stamp design until 1966. On the religious topic, personalities of Anglicanism were honored by commemorative stamps.

The political life of the island appeared too in 1960 with a two-shilling eight pence stamp figuring Queen Elizabeth II by Pietro Annigoni and a map of Norfolk. It commemorated the institution of local government. Institutional evolutions and anniversaries were topics of stamps: 50 years of the statute of territory in 1964, 125 years of annexation to Van Diemen's Land in 1969, the first Legislative Assembly in 1979, ten years of internal self-governing in 1989.

Progressively, the philatelic program explored off-island topics: commemorations of the Pacific War, life of Queen Elizabeth II and of the royal family, historic events anniversaries as powered flights in 2003, etc.

On a technical side, with the help of Walsall Security Printers, Norfolk issued between 1974 and 1978 fourteen self-adhesive stamps cut in the form of the island: two for the 150 years of its second penal settlement, four for the centenary of the Universal Postal Union using Norfolk landscapes, and eight about the Scout Movement.

=== After 2016 ===
With the Norfolk Island Reforms taking effect in July 2016 the island's autonomy ended and the issuing of postage stamps ceased in June 2016. Australia Post announced that it would continue to issue stamps with Norfolk Island, Australia inscription.

Stamp Issues since 2016
Issue name	Date	Number in issue	Denominations	Ref.
Seabirds of Norfolk Island	20 September 2016	2	$1, $2	
Norfolk Island Waterfalls	17 January 2017	2	$1, $2	
Norfolk Island Flowers	18 July 2017	2	$1, $2	
Norfolk Island Convict Heritage	19 September 2017	2	$1, $2	
Norfolk Island Golf	27 February 2017	1		
Norfolk Island Wrasses	30 April 2017	2	$1, $2	
Norfolk Island Crystal Pool	17 July 2018	2	$1, $2	
Norfolk Island Cruise Ships	18 September 2018	2	$1, $2	
Norfolk Island: Pitcairn Settlement	22 January 2019	2	$1, $2	
Norfolk Island Tree Fern	2 April 2019	2	$1, $2	
Phillip Island Landscapes	9 July 2019	2	$1, $2	
Mutiny on the Bounty	24 September 2019	2	$1, $2	
Norfolk Island Early Botanical Art	14 January 2020	2	$1.10, $2.20	
Norfolk Blue	2 June 2020	2	$1.10, $2.20	
Norfolk Island Ocean Oddities	14 July 2020	2	$1.10, $2.20	
Norfolk Island: Peace in the Pacific	1 September 2020	2	$1.10, $2.20	
Norfolk Island Lizards	9 February 2020	2	$1.10, $2.20	
Norfolk Island Land Snails	22 June 2021	2	$1.10, $2.20	
Norfolk Island Museum: Maritime Models	13 July 2021	2	$1.10, $2.20	
Norfolk Island Butterflies	21 September 2021	2	$1.10, $2.20	

== Synthesis ==
Year	Stamps used
Value in pound, shilling and penny
1854–1855	stamps of Van Diemen's Land; Van Diemen's Land
1877–1913	stamps of New South Wales; New South Wales
Value in Australian pound, shilling and penny
1913–1947	stamps of Australia; Australia
1947–1966	Norfolk Island
Value in Australian dollar and cent
1966–2016	Norfolk Island
Key
italic	mention on stamp

== Sources and references ==
- "Norfolk Island," in Commonwealth Stamp Catalogue Australia, Stanley Gibbons, 2007, pages 120–135.
- P. Collas, Assistant Controller at the Postmaster-General’s Department in Melbourne, Stamps of the Australian Territories: Norfolk [from 1853 to 1968], published on the Pitcairn Islands Study Center website, Pacific Union College, unknown date; page
