= The River Why (film) =

- Directed by: Matthew Leutwyler
- Written by: Thomas A. Cohen; John Jay Osborn, Jr.
- Based on: The River Why by David James Duncan
- Produced by: Kristi Denton Cohen
- Starring: Zach Gilford; Amber Heard; Kathleen Quinlan; Dallas Roberts; William Devane; William Hurt
- Cinematography: Karsten Gopinath
- Production companies: Peloton Productions; Ambush Entertainment; StopTime Productions
- Release date: April 2010 (Newport Beach)
- Running time: 101 minutes
- Country: United States
- Language: English

The River Why is a 2010 American independent drama film directed by Matthew Leutwyler. It is an adaptation of the 1983 Sierra Club novel of the same name by David James Duncan and stars Zach Gilford, William Hurt and Amber Heard. Showtime broadcast the film in August 2011 and was later screened in the United States as benefit for fish and river conservation groups. The film was released on Blu-ray and DVD on November 8, 2011. The film won the award for Best Cinematography at the Ashland Film Festival and the Audience Award for Best film at The Naples International Film Festival.

The film's title is a homophone of the River Wye.

== Plot ==
The River Why is an adaptation of the 1983 Sierra Club novel by David James Duncan. The coming-of-age tale centers on a young man named Augustine "Gus" Orviston (Zach Gilford) and his quest for an elusive Rainbow Trout, which is a metaphor for his internal search for self-knowledge. Amber Heard plays his love interest, a tomboy fly-fisher named Eddy.

The film begins with Gus, a discontented city dweller, fresh out of high school. Gus and his quiet, younger brother are audience to his parents; avid fishermen whom cannot seem to find an agreement over their separate loves of bait and fly fishing. After briefly glimpsing Eddy at a fishing exhibition and her passionate argument to save Oregon rivers, restless Gus has had enough of conforming to a life he doesn't feel he is fit for. Following an explosive argument with his parents, Gus moves to a small cabin in the country alongside a river. His objective: fishing every day and all day. As he begins to sink into his new routine, Gus is puzzled to find he is still discontent with what he has always believed is his "ideal" life.

This boils over when Gus takes a day trip in his canoe and finds the body of a man deemed missing by the papers a few weeks earlier who has died while fly fishing. Gus pulls him back to shore where they are retrieved by law enforcement. Besides being cold and exhausted, Gus is physically fine but emotionally he is in a turmoil. Truly facing death for the first time, Gus is overwhelmed by the meaningless life he feels he is living. He goes to the city, uncharacteristically getting drunk. He meets a strange but friendly philosopher named Titus. The two talk and Titus helps Gus understand his discontentment while becoming fast friends. Things begin to look up for Gus as he teaches the neighborhood children to fish and sells handmade flies and rods to support himself. Gus finally sees Eddy again while taking a hike. He witnesses her skinny dipping and fishing. To preserve her modesty, he drops his things and moves to a separate location and begins whistling so she knows he is coming. After an awkward interaction, Eddy finds Gus's things that he dropped when he initially saw her and leaves when Gus isn't looking. A disappointed Gus still stores the fishing rod and fish that Eddy left behind in the hopes that she will return. Soon after, when a chance encounter with a beginner fly-fisherman turns into an impromptu newspaper interview with a well-known local journalist, Gus finds a way to promote his tackle shop and get in contact with Eddy by releasing his location and letting "the young woman who left her fishing pole and trout with him" know that it's available at any time. Amidst giving fishing advice, selling tackle, and of course continuing to fish himself, Gus finds himself almost happy, but still wishing to be with Eddy who has yet to return. After coming back to his cabin one day though, Gus is surprised to find Eddy inside, waiting for him. The two talk and spend the weekend getting to know each other, ending with a kiss. Eddy continues to see Gus as the two grow closer.

Eddy catches a large Chinook Salmon to Gus's surprise and to his even greater surprise, hands him the fishing pole and upon letting him know she'll see him after heading back to her house in the nearby city of Portland, Oregon, leaves him to reflect while following the Chinook upriver. After a full day and the majority of the night, the Chinook finally tires, leaving Gus able to bring it to hand. Instead, Gus cuts the line and lets the fish go, realizing that Eddy had him do this to help him understand that the true meaning of his life could never be something as simple as fishing but instead to do what he loves with the people he loves. Finding Eddy waiting for him, the two consummate their relationship. Eddy leads Gus to the final piece of his puzzle of finding meaning in his life when she takes him to a small beach on the river by his cabin where he is both surprised and joyfully overwhelmed to find his family waiting for him. The film ends with a finally content Gus introducing Eddy to his family as they all fish together.

== Cast ==
- Zach Gilford as Gus Orviston
- Amber Heard as Eddy
- William Hurt as Henning Hale-Orviston
- Dallas Roberts as Titus
- Kathleen Quinlan as Carolina "Ma" Carper-Orviston
  - Nikki DeLoach as Young Carolina "Ma" Carper
- Brendan Robinson as Kernie
- William Devane as "Dutch" Hines
- Gattlin Griffith as Bill Bob
- Robert Zorn as Fly Shop Owner
- Breanna Aleigh Grimes as Marlene

== Production ==
On April 30, 2008, the film rights to The River Why became the subject of a lawsuit by novelist Duncan, alleging copyright infringement among other issues. The lawsuit was settled and the case dismissed in November 2008.

In June 2008, actors William Hurt and Amber Heard joined the cast; filming began in Portland, Oregon in July 2008.

== See also ==
- Plotinus
