= Book-It Repertory Theatre =

Non-profit organization in the USA

- Formation: 1987
- Type: Theatre group
- Location: Seattle, Washington

Book-It Repertory Theatre (often shortened to "Book-It") is a regional theatre located in Seattle, Washington. It is a 501-c(3) registered nonprofit corporation, and is devoted to "transforming great literature into great theatre through simple and sensitive production and to inspiring its audiences to read". Founded in 1987, it is now led by Co-Artistic Directors Jane Jones and Myra Platt, and is a 2012 Governor's Arts Award winner and 2010 Mayor's Arts Award winner. It is a member of Theatre Puget Sound and a part of The Kennedy Center's Partners in Education Program.

== History ==
Book-It Repertory Theatre's history begins in 1986, when Co-Artistic Director Jane Jones led the 29th Street Project in New York City, an artistic collective that comprised graduates and company members from the American Conservatory Theater in San Francisco, to experiment with performing short stories for the stage.

After moving to Seattle in 1987, Jane Jones, Tony Pasqualini, Mark Jenkins, Robyn Smith, and Sarah Brooke, among others, formed The Collective at the Pasqualini/Smith acting studio in a three-story walk-up on Pine Street in Seattle's Capitol Hill. Myra Platt, Book-It's future Co-Artistic Director, joined The Collective in 1988. Members of The Collective began to experiment with the concept of Book-It by adapting literature into theatre. They began by experimenting with the performance of short stories. It became an official registered nonprofit under the name Book-It in 1990, and at this time mainly toured schools and libraries with its performances. Book-It established its first main stage home in 1995, in a 50-seat theatre on Westlake Avenue. Several early shows were performed on Seattle Repertory Theatre stages, until in 2000 Book-It was able to move to their current location at Seattle Center.

When Book-It first moved to Seattle Center, their location was called the Center House. It is now known as The Armory.

In 2019, Book-It announced that founding co-artistic directors Jane Jones and Myra Platt would step down from their roles in summer of 2020.

Book-It announced their closure in June 2023, with the last show scheduled for July 9, 2023. The 2023–24 season, which had already been scheduled, was cancelled and refunds were issued to patrons.

=== Co-productions ===
In October of 2024, Jones and Platt produced The Story of Edgar Sawtelle with the Vashon Repertory Theatre using a script produced for Book-It. Charlotte Tiencken, Book-It’s managing director from 2006-14 and Vashon Repertory Theatre’s founder and artistic director, has been quoted saying she would like to do a co-production with Book-It once per season.

== Book-It Style ==
All of the shows produced by Book-It adhere to a specific style called "Book-It Style," which preserves the author's exact words in the script rather than changing them for the stage. The words and phrases in the book are acted out in dialogue on stage, including descriptions and even taglines. The Book-It Style doesn't rely on a designated narrator for these moments but instead distributes the narrative: descriptions, inner thoughts, etc., among the characters, giving the audience clues about a character based on "point of view."

== Arts and Education Program ==
Book-It Repertory Theatre's Arts and Education Program (formerly called "Book-It All Over") involves a host of different activities aimed at promoting literacy and a love of reading in children. Book-It was able to expand this program thanks to a grant from the Hearst Foundation.

=== Touring series ===
The touring series involves several adaptations of books for children or young adults, and travels to libraries, community centers, and schools in the Seattle area. These performances include a book for each student as well as a study guide and interactive workshop. One of the shows that tours every year is called "Danger: Books!" and features actors reading from books that have been banned or challenged in the US.

=== Family Fun Series ===
This series takes place on the main stage, and usually hosts about three shows per season. They include a short play based on a children's or young adult book, a book-themed craft project, and workshops for younger and older children to participate in after the performance. Parents are encouraged to attend these performances with their children.

=== Student Matinee Series ===
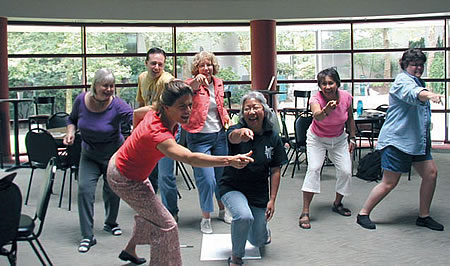
"Bringing Theatre into the Classroom" participants working with Book-It, Seattle Children's Theatre, and Seattle Rep teachers.

Like many theatres, Book-It hosts student matinees for some of their (audience-appropriate) main stage shows, offering a low-cost option for teachers to bring students to the shows on school trips.

=== Residencies ===
Book-It describes a teacher residency as a "long-term customized program designed with classroom teachers to address specific curricula, academic standards, and students' needs." These programs include a touring series production as well.

=== Teacher training ===
Book-It offers workshops for groups of teachers and also participates in a five-day summer program in collaboration with other Seattle area theatres called Bringing Theatre into the Classroom.

== Mainstage Productions ==
=== 1999-2000 ===
- Jane Eyre by Charlotte Brontë
- Owen Meany's Christmas Pageant by John Irving
- Double Indemnity by James M. Cain
- The Awakening by Kate Chopin

=== 2000-2001 ===
- Pride and Prejudice by Jane Austen
- Owen Meany's Christmas Pageant by John Irving
- Silver Water by Amy Bloom
- Sweet Thursday by John Steinbeck
- In a Shallow Grave by James Purdy

=== 2001-2002 ===
- Lady Chatterley's Lover by D.H. Lawrence
- Owen Meany's Christmas Pageant by John Irving
- Ethan Frome by Edith Wharton
- If I Die in a Combat Zone, Box Me Up and Ship Me Home by Tim O'Brien
- Howards End by E. M. Forster

=== 2002-2003 ===
- Cowboys are My Weakness by Pam Houston
- Owen Meany's Christmas Pageant by John Irving
- A Christmas Memory by Truman Capote
- A Child's Christmas in Wales by Dylan Thomas
- I Know Why the Caged Bird Sings by Dr. Maya Angelou
- Hard Times by Charles Dickens
- Breathing Lessons by Anne Tyler

=== 2003-2004 ===
- Dracula by Bram Stoker
- Red Ranger Came Calling by Berkeley Breathed
- Pride and Prejudice by Jane Austen
- Cry, the Beloved Country by Alan Paton
- Travels with Charley by John Steinbeck

=== 2004-2005 ===
- Waxwings by Jonathan Raban
- Red Ranger Came Calling by Berkeley Breathed
- Rebecca by Daphne du Maurier
- Giant by Edna Ferber
- The Awakening by Kate Chopin

=== 2005-2006 ===
- Don Quixote by Miguel de Cervantes
- Little Women by Louisa May Alcott
- Bud, Not Buddy by Christopher Paul Curtis
- Plainsong by Kent Haruf
- House of Mirth by Edith Wharton

=== 2006-2007 ===
- Broken for You by Stephanie Kallos
- Bud, Not Buddy by Christopher Paul Curtis
- A Tale of Two Cities by Charles Dickens
- Rhoda: A Life in Stories by Ellen Gilchrist
- The House of Spirits by Isabel Allende

=== 2007-2008 ===
- Snow Falling on Cedars by David Guterson
- Peter Pan by J.M. Barrie
- Persuasion by Jane Austen
- The Highest Tide by Jim Lynch

=== 2008-2009 ===
- Even Cowgirls Get the Blues by Tom Robbins
- My Antonia by Willa Cather
- Moby Dick by Herman Melville
- The Beautiful Things that Heaven Bears by Dinaw Mengestu
- Night Flight by Antoine de Saint-Exupéry

=== 2009-2010 ===
- A Confederacy of Dunces by John Kennedy Toole
- Emma by Jane Austen
- The River Why by David James Duncan
- The Cider House Rules: Part 1 by John Irving and adapted by Peter Parnell

=== 2010-2011 ===
- The Cider House Rules: Part 2 by John Irving and adapted by Peter Parnell
- Red Ranger Came Calling by Berkeley Breathed
- Great Expectations by Charles Dickens
- Sense and Sensibility by Jane Austen
- Border Songs by Jim Lynch

=== 2011-2012 ===
- Owen Meany's Christmas Pageant by John Irving
- Prairie Nocturne by Ivan Doig
- The Art of Racing in the Rain by Garth Stein

=== 2012-2013 ===
- Hotel on the Corner of Bitter and Sweet by Jamie Ford
- Owen Meany's Christmas Pageant by John Irving
- Anna Karenina by Leo Tolstoy
- Adventures of Huckleberry Finn by Mark Twain
- The Financial Lives of the Poets by Jess Walter

=== 2013-2014 ===
- She's Come Undone by Wally Lamb
- Frankenstein; Or, the Modern Prometheus by Mary Shelley
- Truth Like the Sun by Jim Lynch
- The Amazing Adventures of Kavalier & Clay by Michael Chabon

=== 2014-2015 ===
- I Am of Ireland: A Collection of Stories, Song, and Dance from short story authors Frank O'Connor, W. B. Yeats, Mary Lavin, and Paul Vincent Carroll
- Pride and Prejudice by Jane Austen
- The Dog of the South by Charles Portis
- Little Bee by Chris Cleave
- Slaughterhouse-Five by Kurt Vonnegut

=== 2015-2016 ===
- What We Talk About When We Talk About Love by Raymond Carver
- Emma by Jane Austen
- The Brothers K by David James Duncan

=== 2016-2017 ===
- A Tale for the Time Being by Ruth Ozeki
- Treasure Island by Robert Louis Stevenson
- A Moveable Feast by Ernest Hemingway
- Welcome to Braggsville by T. Geronimo Johnson

=== 2017-2018 ===
- I Know Why the Caged Bird Sings by Dr. Maya Angelou
- Howl's Moving Castle by Diana Wynne Jones
- The Maltese Falcon by Dashiell Hammett
- The Brief Wondrous Life of Oscar Wao by Junot Díaz
- The Picture of Dorian Gray by Oscar Wilde

=== 2018-2019 ===
- Jane Eyre by Charlotte Brontë
- My Ántonia by Willa Cather
- American Junkie by Tom Hansen
- Returning the Bones by Gin Hammond
- Behold the Dreamers by Imbolo Mbue

=== 2019-2020 ===
- Everything is Illuminated by Jonathan Safran Foer
- Howl's Moving Castle by Diana Wynne Jones
- The Turn of the Screw by Henry James
- The Story of Edgar Sawtelle by David Wroblewski

=== 2020-2021 ===
- Childfinder by Octavia E. Butler
- The Canterville Ghost by Oscar Wilde
- Mañanaland by Pam Muñoz Ryan
- The Effluent Engine by N.K. Jemisin
- The Mandala of Sherlock Holmes by Jamyang Norbu

=== 2021-2022 ===
- Zen and the Art of an Android Beatdown by Tochi Onyebuchi (Audio)
- The Three Musketeers by Alexandre Dumas (Audio)
- Beowulf adapted by Julian Glover
- Mrs. Caliban by Rachel Ingalls
- The Bonesetter’s Daughter by Amy Tan

=== 2022-2023 ===
- In the Time of the Butterflies by Julia Alvarez
- Austen Unbound, an improvised play
- The Murder of Roger Ackroyd by Agatha Christie
- Solaris by Stanislaw Lem

== Circumbendibus ==
Circumbendibus was a late-night series. Launched in the fall of 2012, it featured adaptations of three non-traditional texts: one based on food writing and cookbooks, one based on geek literature and graphic novels, and one based on a collection of short stories. The short story collection was Jesus' Son by Denis Johnson, adapted for the stage by Johnson and Jeff Schwager.

For the 2013 Circumbendibus series, Jesus' Son was expanded and re-located to Seattle's West of Lenin venue.
