= Norfolk Island Postal Service =

Defunct postal service

- Successor: Australia Post
- Formation: 1947
- Dissolved: 2016
- Type: Postal
- Headquarters: Burnt Pine, Norfolk Island
- Region served: Territory of Norfolk Island

Norfolk Island Postal Service was responsible for the providing stamps, receipt and delivery of mail to and from Norfolk Island under the arrangements formalised by the Postal Services Act 1983.

There were two operating units of the Postal Service:

- Norfolk Island Philatelic Bureau
- Norfolk Post

The service began in 1947 when the island assumed full control over postal services.

The first stamps from Norfolk Island were issued in 1947 (Scott 1–12); the last on 7 June 2016.

Norfolk Post did not provide local mail delivery service on the island, with residential and business customers required to lease a post office box, reducing the costs of postal services on the island. Additional revenues were earned through the sale of stamps issued on the island in mainland Australia and internationally, with these markets comprising 95% of the Philatelic Bureau's stamp sales in 1997.

While the Norfolk Island Postal Service was internationally recognised as its own administration, it was never a member of the Universal Postal Union, with the island interests represented by Australia in this forum. The assignment of an Australian postal code to the island assisted sorting and routing of international mail. Some local businesses complained however that this led to confusion when conducting trade with the Australian mainland, where tax exemptions applied for export of products from the territory. In 1999, a parliamentary committee examining communications with Australia's External Territories identified that this lack of distinction of Norfolk Island as a separate, independent entity contributed to higher costs and delayed delivery of mail from the mainland. In some cases, parcels sent as priority air mail would arrive in Sydney, but then be loaded onto a ship for the final leg as International Postal Union agreements gave Australia Post discretion to complete the journey as surface mail once these arrived in the destination country. Witnesses at the committee reported that this was a barrier for businesses and professional services operating on the island, citing a decision by the United States Postal Service to suspend priority and air mail options to Norfolk Island as a result.

As of 1 July 2016, the administration of Norfolk Island was restructured as a regional council, under the jurisdiction of the Australian State of New South Wales thus, ceased having its own postal service and postage stamps.

Australian stamps are now valid on the island, and Australia Post will issue separate stamps with a “Norfolk Island, Australia” inscription, similar to its stamps for the Australian Antarctic Territory, Christmas Island and Cocos (Keeling) Islands.

== See also ==
- Postage stamps and postal history of Norfolk Island
