= John Jay Osborn Jr. =

American novelist (1945–2022)

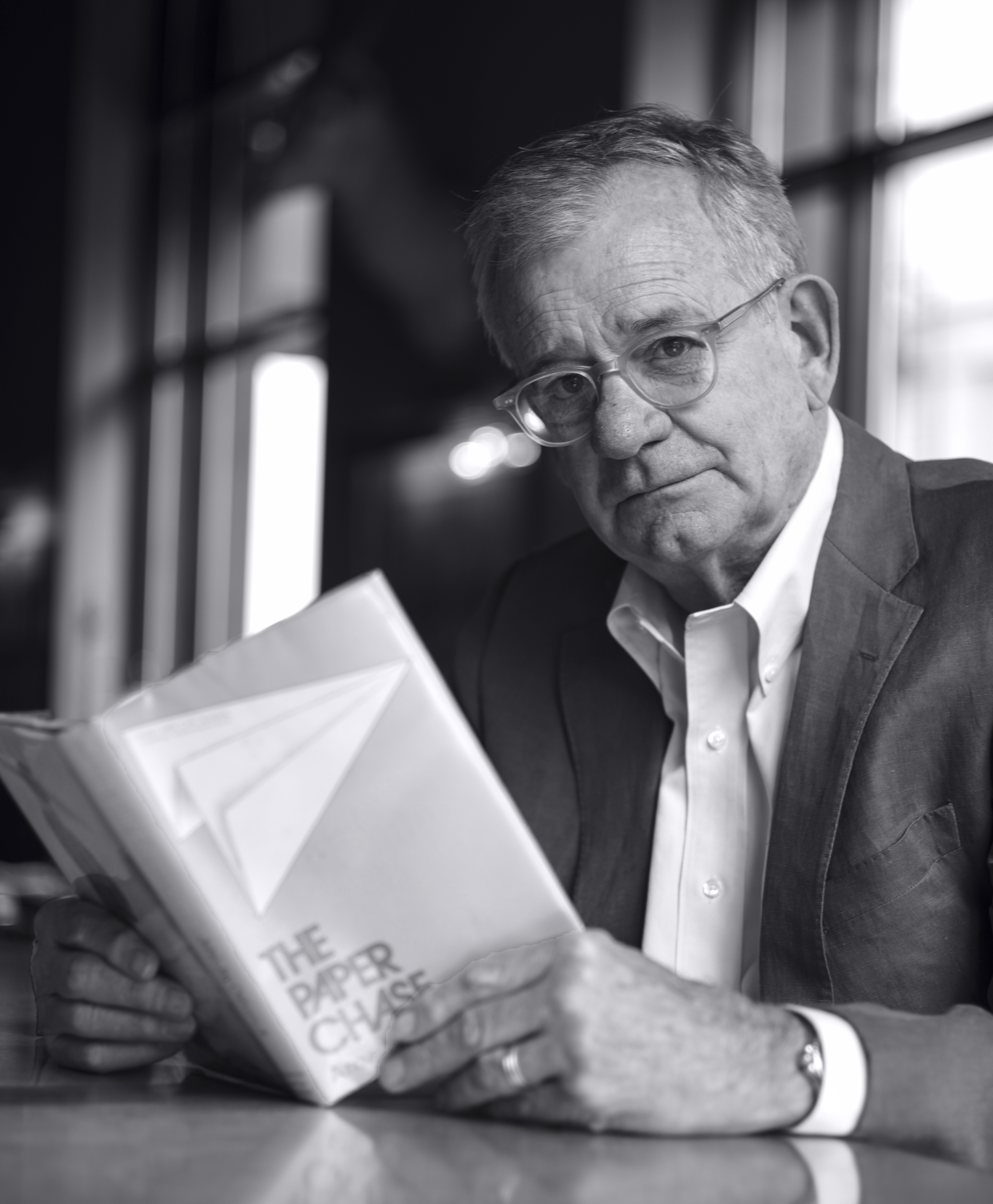
- Osborn in 2016
- Born: August 5, 1945; Boston, Massachusetts, U.S.
- Died: October 19, 2022 (aged 77); San Francisco, California, U.S.
- Education: Harvard University (BA, JD); Yale University
- Occupations: Novelist; screenwriter; attorney; law professor
- Writing career
- Notable works: The Paper Chase; The Associates

John Jay Osborn Jr. (August 5, 1945 – October 19, 2022) was an American author, lawyer, law professor, and author of The Paper Chase, a bestselling novel published in 1971, and other works.

== Early life and education ==
Osborn was born in Boston, on August 5, 1945. His father, John Jay Sr., was a doctor at Stanford University School of Medicine; his mother was Anne (née Kidder). He was a descendant of both John Jay, a Founding Father and the first Chief Justice of the United States, and of railroad baron Cornelius Vanderbilt.

When Osborn was nine, he relocated with his family from Boston to the San Francisco Bay Area. He attended Harvard University, where he graduated with a Bachelor of Arts in American history in 1967, and then obtained his Juris Doctor from Harvard Law School in 1970. He also did graduate work at Yale Law School.

== Career ==
=== The Paper Chase ===
For his third-year writing project at Harvard Law, Osborn wrote The Paper Chase, a fictional account of one Harvard Law School student's battles with the imperious Professor Charles Kingsfield. Osborn found a publisher with the assistance of William Alfred and the book was released in 1971. It was made into a film two years later, starring John Houseman and Timothy Bottoms. Houseman won an Academy Award for Best Supporting Actor for his performance as contracts professor Kingsfield. The Paper Chase also became a television series, and Osborn wrote several of the scripts.

=== Law ===
After graduating from law school, Osborn clerked for Judge Max Rosenn of the United States Court of Appeals for the Third Circuit from 1970 to 1972. He was later an associate attorney with the firm Patterson Belknap Webb & Tyler.

=== Law professor ===
Osborn taught law at the University of Miami, the Benjamin N. Cardozo School of Law at Yeshiva University, the UC Berkeley School of Law, and the University of San Francisco School of Law, from which he retired in 2018.

=== Further novels and writings ===
Osborn's third novel, The Associates, was adapted into a short-lived television series starring Martin Short and Wilfrid Hyde-White. He was also one of the writers, along with Thomas A. Cohen, of the screenplay for the 2010 film version of the 1983 novel The River Why by David James Duncan. His final book, Listen to the Marriage, was published in 2018.

== Personal life ==
Osborn married Emilie Heffron Sisson in 1968. She was a Radcliffe College graduate who worked as a physician with the Palo Alto Medical Foundation, and they remained married until his death. Together, they had three children, including Sam and Meredith, who also attended Harvard College and Harvard Law School.

Osborn died on October 19, 2022, at his home in San Francisco, at age 77. He suffered from squamous cell cancer prior to his death.

== Publications ==
Novels

- The Paper Chase (1971)
- The Only Thing I've Done Wrong (1977) ISBN 9780395251744
- The Associates (1979) ISBN 9780395270974
- The Man Who Owned New York (1981) ISBN 9780395305119
- Listen to the Marriage (2018)

Scripts

- The Paper Chase (15 of 54 episodes, 1978–1986)
  - "The Man Who Would Be King" (1978)
  - "A Day in the Life of..." (1978)
  - "Moot Court" (1978)
  - "The Sorcerer's Apprentice" (1978)
  - "Scavenger Hunt" (1979)
  - "Outline Fever" (1983)
  - "Birthday Party" (1983)
  - "Plague of Locusts" (1983)
  - "Snow" (1983)
  - "Mrs. Hart" (1984)
  - "War of the Wonks" (1984)
  - "Billy Pierce" (1984) (teleplay only)
  - "Decisions: Part 1" (1985)
  - "Decisions: Part 2" (1985)
  - "Honor" (1986)
- L.A. Law (1 episode, 1986–1994)
  - "December Bribe" (1987)
- Spenser: For Hire (1 episode, 1985–1988)
  - "Substantial Justice" (1988)
- The River Why (2010, with Thomas A. Cohen)
