= List of The Paper Chase episodes =

This is a list of episodes for the television series The Paper Chase.

All four seasons of this show have been released on DVD by Shout! Factory.

The Production Codes were taken from the United States Copyright Office.

== Series overview ==
Season	Episodes	Originally released		
Season	Episodes	First released	Last released	Network
1	22	September 9, 1978	April 24, 1979	CBS
2	19	April 15, 1983	August 21, 1984	Showtime
3	12	May 11, 1985	September 10, 1985	Showtime
4	6	June 28, 1986	August 9, 1986	Showtime

== Episodes ==
=== Season 1 (1978–79) ===
No. overall	No. in season	Title	Directed by	Written by	Original release date	Prod. code
1	1	"The Paper Chase"	Joseph Hardy	James Bridges	September 9, 1978	X-910
Pilot: James Hart barely makes it to his first class with Professor Kingsfield on time. This does not go unnoticed. Kingsfield asks him the first question and discovers he has not read the assigned material. Kingsfield throws an imaginary funeral shroud over "the late Mr. Hart", meaning he no longer exists as far as the professor is concerned. Hart joins a study group with Franklin Ford III, Willis Bell, Thomas Anderson, and Linda O'Connor, who was replaced without explanation after the first episode by a new character, Elizabeth Logan. Hart comes up with a novel solution to his problem: he enters the classroom shrouded in a bed sheet as a ghost, bothering the professor into calling on him. Hart gives a good answer, earning himself a second chance.
2	2	"The Man Who Would Be King"	Gwen Arner	John Jay Osborn, Jr.	September 19, 1978	T-704
Franklin Ford's father (Don Porter) visits the law school to interview second-year students for summer internships at his high-profile law firm, accompanied by Ford's sixteen-year-old sister. Ford goes to pieces when his father sits in on the class. Under pressure from his father, he runs for the prestigious law school council. He feels betrayed when Hart also runs and the rest of their study group unanimously back Hart. Ford and Hart make up and, by not showing up, enable Anderson to win by default. Ford's sister is attracted to Hart, who politely rejects her. Ford's father pressures the dean and Kingsfield to give preference to his son, but Kingsfield shows the elder Ford his efforts are damaging to his son and their relationship.
3	3	"A Day in the Life of..."	Philip Leacock	John Jay Osborn, Jr.	September 26, 1978	T-702
When Hart asks Kingsfield a question after class, he is told to find the answer for himself and present a report to Kingsfield the next morning. After Ford steals Bell's study group notes, Bell's outrage gets him and Hart barred from the library. Hart meets a woman who turns out to be the president of Law Review, who commissions a ghostwritten report for him. Hart elects to do the work himself, which is fortunate, as he is ordered by Kingsfield to give his report orally to the entire class. Logan gets arrested for encouraging girls school students to protest, but is released the next morning after Kingsfield speaks privately with the judge. Hart writes his parents a letter, confiding he thinks he is "going to be alright".
4	4	"Great Expectations"	Harvey S. Laidman	Ellison Carroll	October 3, 1978	T-701
The study group plans a weekend getaway picnic to blow off steam, but Professor Kingsfield assigns a lot of work at the last minute, causing the group to drop the getaway and just have an on-campus party. Two drunken students—Sam Pray, a third-year law student, and Fitch, a dental-school student—break into the law school's dispensary during a dorm party. In pursuit of Fitch's affections, Anderson follows and is arrested at the scene. He faces a disciplinary hearing, chaired by Kingsfield, and possible expulsion. Anderson talks Hart into acting as his defense counsel. Fitch confesses, clearing Anderson.
5	5	"Voices of Silence"	Alex March	Stephen Kandel	October 10, 1978	T-705
Logan and Hart volunteer to take part in a prison legal assistance program. They soon get more than they expected, from activist/prisoner Eric Ryerson (David Ackroyd).
6	6	"Nancy"	William Hale	T. S. Cook	October 17, 1978	T-703
Hart's girlfriend and fellow law student Nancy Burch has a secret - her father is an attorney who is mixed up with the mob. Events that follow cause her and Hart to be the subject of guilt by association, as they are scrutinized by the police, the media, the university, and other students.
7	7	"Da Da"	Philip Leacock	Gordon Hoban	October 31, 1978	T-707
Clayton finds his photographic memory is not enough in Kingsfield's class. The professor humiliates him in front of his fellow students when he is unable to analyze a case he has memorized. The pressure threatens his marriage and causes him to go on a drinking binge. Hart brings Clayton into the empty classroom at night, playing the part of Kingsfield and coaching him. The janitor calls Kingsfield in to see what is going on, but upon observing the proceedings, Kingsfield says, "Oh, they're just stretching." Later, Clayton successfully answers Kingsfield's question in class. Kim Cattrall played Clayton's wife.
8	8	"The Seating Chart"	Robert C. Thompson	James Bridges	November 14, 1978	T-706
Bell believes that his unflattering seating chart picture is the reason that he gets singled out in class and plots to change it secretly, with Hart's reluctant help. They sneak into Kingsfield's office late on a Friday night, but the professor's unexpected appearance results in them hiding and being inadvertently locked in a closet for the entire weekend. They manage to sneak out on Monday morning undetected, but in Bell's haste in substituting a new photo during their escape, he puts it in upside down.
9	9	"Moot Court"	Seymour Robbie	John Jay Osborn, Jr.	November 21, 1978	T-709
The students are paired off by random draw for moot court, a courtroom-like competition. Hart lucks out, as his partner is close friend and fellow study group member Logan. Bell is teamed with his polar opposite, highly disciplined African-American Raymond Livingston (Glynn Turman). Livingston, fresh off his undergraduate study at West Point, believes in the "strong body, strong mind" approach, so he makes Bell get up at dawn for calisthenics and jogging every day before studying. Meanwhile, all the intense one-on-one studying time with Logan causes Hart to examine his personal feelings for her. In the finals, Hart and Logan face off against Bell and Livingston. Bell is so fed up with being pushed incessantly by Livingston that he resigns from the competition. Livingston persuades him to change his mind.
10	10	"Kingsfield's Daughter"	Alex March	Gordon Hoban	November 28, 1978	T-711
Hart falls for a young woman who is surprisingly familiar with contract law and hostile to the law students who study it. (This is also a major part of the plot of the original film.)
11	11	"The Sorcerer's Apprentice"	Larry Elikann	John Jay Osborn, Jr. Leigh Curran	December 5, 1978	T-708
Supreme Court Justice Reynolds (Alan Napier) pays a visit to campus to commemorate a milestone anniversary of women being admitted to the law school. During a question-and-answer session in Kingsfield's class, Logan confronts the judge as to why he has never hired a female law clerk. Professor Kingsfield attempts to stifle her, yet she persists, but does not get an answer from the judge. News of Logan's audacity quickly spreads across campus and to national women's activist organizations, who send a bunch of demonstrators/hecklers to campus for the judge's celebratory speech. Much to Logan's dismay, the outsiders turn it into an embarrassing circus.
12	12	"Bell's in Love"	Peter Levin	Richard Kramer	December 12, 1978	T-710
A female friend from Hart's hometown comes to visit Hart while trying to sort out her struggling marriage. As usual, Hart is swamped, so he asks Bell to keep her company for a few days. Love-struck Bell skips classes to be with her, and goes so far as to start looking for apartments where he and she can live together. Her husband shows up to reconcile, but Bell forgets to inform her of that development.
13	13	"An Act of Desperation"	Carl Kugel	James Menzies; Marvin Kupfer	December 19, 1978	T-712
Brooks has fallen behind in his studies and wants to rejoin the study group. Hart is willing, but the others are reluctant, until Brooks produces some study aids from his "tutor" Woodrow Tullis (David Ogden Stiers). The entire study group (even the struggling Brooks) gets an A in Kingsfield's mid-term exam. This raises suspicions among the other students. Hart gets to the bottom of this, and it ends with Brooks' amicable exit interview in Kingsfield's office. (This is the last episode to feature Jonathan Segal.)
14	14	"Losing Streak"	Alex March	Shimon Wincelberg	January 19, 1979	T-714
Anderson likes his poker and after cleaning out his fellow 1-L players, he pays a visit to a female third-year student whom Logan knows. When she is too busy that evening, Anderson is about to leave her residence when he gets sucked into a poker game with a group of 3-Ls. Anderson racks up a huge $800 debt he cannot repay, until the study group comes to his aid, bankrolled anonymously by Ford.
15	15	"The Man in the Chair"	Robert C. Thompson	Jerome Ross	February 6, 1979	T-715
A disabled transfer student (Leigh McCloskey) is befriended by, and included in, the study group. As time goes on, he takes advantage of the group's kindness. His mother (Jayne Meadows), who, as a family friend of Kingsfield, attempts to gain preferential treatment for her son.
16	16	"A Matter of Anger"	Seymour Robbie	Albert Aley; Marvin Kupfer	February 13, 1979	T-716
An African-American law student (Denise Nicholas) feels insecure and angry because she was accepted to law school through the Affirmative Action program. This is compounded by the fact that her mother is employed as a maid/waitress at a university tea party honoring the law students, where the student ends up making a scene in front of Kingsfield and the dean. At Kingsfield's request, Hart reluctantly becomes the hostile woman's tutor. An influential white alumnus, his son having been rejected despite having better grades than the woman, does his best to change the government's stance on Affirmative Action.
17	17	"The Apprentice"	Kenneth Gilbert	William Hopkins	February 20, 1979	T-717
Kingsfield makes the unprecedented decision to hire an inexperienced first-year student - Hart - to assist him and a third-year student to prepare for a significant case in New York City. The 3-L, nearing graduation and fourth in his class, is busy fielding job opportunities, so he dumps most of his work on Hart. Kingsfield is not fooled and dismisses the 3-L from the case, leaving Hart as his only assistant. Hart accompanies Kingsfield to New York. Hart is distracted by the nightlife and fails to catch a mistake made by the 3-L.
18	18	"Once More with Feeling"	Marvin Kupfer	William Froug	February 27, 1979	T-718
When Logan spurns the improper advances of a respected law professor (Robert Reed), she is surprised to see the result is a low grade on a test. However, Kingsfield, head of the disciplinary committee, dismisses her complaint because she has no proof. Logan's friends seek out other victims to corroborate her claims.
19	19	"The Clay Footed Idol"	Larry Elikann	David P. Harmon	March 20, 1979	T-719
Kingsfield has his students form groups to argue both sides of a case of their choice. When Hart's study group selects a case (completely by accident) that the professor lost early in his career, they start to question his ethics after they learn that he did not file what appears to them to be a routine appeal. Even Hart has his doubts after a now-prominent attorney who assisted Kingsfield on the case refuses to shed light on the matter. The study group wrestles with thoughts of kickbacks and dishonesty.
20	20	"The Tables Down at Ernie's"	Philip Leacock	Worley Thorne	March 27, 1979	T-713
Kingsfield's character and background are further developed in this episode: his own days as a student at the law school, hanging out at Ernie's in the 1930s, and his friendship, then, with Ernie Sr. However, now Ernie's is threatened with closure. The entire block, owned by the university, is to be razed to make way for a new gym and a parking lot. Ernie cannot afford to hire a lawyer, so Hart takes on the job -- only to learn that his adversary is Kingsfield. Hart appeals to Kingsfield, only to be rebuffed. But Kingsfield's nostalgic memories are sparked by the encounter and he visits Ernie's, there encountering Ernie Sr., who is visiting his son. While they talk, Kingsfield discovers something that might save the bar from being torn down. Later, he drops suggestive hints to Hart. At the last moment, Hart finds proof that the building was built in 1774 and is eligible to be named an historic monument, thus illegal to tear down.
21	21	"A Case of Détente"	Robert C. Thompson	David P. Harmon; Daniel Benton	April 17, 1979	T-721
The law school plays host to the Soviet gymnastics team, who are in the USA on a goodwill tour. Hart, Logan and others volunteer to show the Soviet team members around, but are given strict rules against unchaperoned socializing. Of course, this matters little to Hart once he sees the pretty balance-beam girl. Naturally, their exploits are discovered, and (initially) the penalties are severe. When it is discovered that she snuck out to spend time with Hart in his dorm room, he is suspended from classes for a month and she is kicked off the team. A law professor (Pernell Roberts) who is teaching Hart's class in Kingsfield's absence tries to address this sticky situation.
22	22	"Scavenger Hunt"	Jack Bender	John Jay Osborn, Jr.	April 24, 1979	T-720
Professor Kingsfield unleashes his annual three-day scavenger hunt on his class. Due to the unusually high quality of this year's students, he does not limit the hunt to the normal "law school materials". There are no rules, and answering less than 75 of the 100 questions will result in a grade of F. In their frenzy, the students wreak havoc on all the campus libraries, even hiding books from rival groups. The resultant disruption inflames several professors, particularly Smathers (Biff McGuire), who want the dean to terminate the scavenger hunt and remove Kingsfield from his position as head of the academic curricula committee. Kingsfield invites Smathers and the dean to attend class when the students hand in their work, where they can see the hidden benefit of the scavenger hunt. Meanwhile, Ford is distracted by Bell's visiting sister.

=== Season 2 (1983–84) ===
No. overall	No. in season	Title	Directed by	Written by	Original release date	Prod. code
23	1	"Outline Fever"	Jack Bender	John Jay Osborn, Jr.	April 15, 1983	8-C03
The second year begins with Hart and Ford moving to an off-campus apartment, while Bell is still at the dorm as the advisor for the 1-L students. Some of the 1-L students hound Hart for his Contracts outline, until Ford and Bell auction it off (against Hart's wishes). Meanwhile, 1-L Connie Lehman (Jane Kaczmarek) shows a personal interest in Hart ... or is it only his outline?
24	2	"Birthday Party"	Jack Bender	John Jay Osborn, Jr.	May 24, 1983	8-C01
Hart and the others want to do something special to mark Professor Kingsfield's 80th birthday, against the advice of Mrs. Nottingham and Kinsgfield himself. Meanwhile, the U.S. Attorney General pays a midnight visit to Kingsfield.
25	3	"Spreading It Thin"	Corey Allen	Lee Kalcheim	June 26, 1983	8-C05
Hart has a feeling that a popular law professor has plagiarized an article for the Law Review and tries to prove it, to the detriment of his schoolwork. Lehman suspects he is just jealous because she greatly admires the professor.
26	4	"Cinderella"	Joseph Pevney	David Sontag	July 15, 1983	8-C07
A female 1-L student struggles to keep up in class while raising a small child alone. Her attempts to persuade the university to establish a day care center appear fruitless. Meanwhile, Ford is assigned to represent a senior citizen battling an unreasonable landlord.
27	5	"Commitments"	Nick Havinga	Joe S. Landon	September 15, 1983	8-C04
Hart's relationship with Lehman is strained to the breaking point when she devotes all her time to an extra assignment from Kingsfield. After a few weeks, Hart has a one-night stand with a guitarist/singer, but immediately realizes he has made a big mistake and reconciles with Lehman. Bell, as dorm adviser, ignores pleas for help from a first-year student (David Caruso).
28	6	"Plague of Locusts"	Joseph Pevney	John Jay Osborn, Jr.	October 26, 1983	8-C02
The annual influx of law firm recruiters invades the campus, and Ford's father (Paul Burke) seems to be leading the charge. Ford Sr.'s tactics cause Jr. to re-evaluate his opinion of his father, and whether he wants to work for the firm. At the end, Kingsfield and Nottingham are glad when the "manta rays" depart. Bell despairs of landing a job.
29	7	"Snow"	Jack Bender	John Jay Osborn, Jr.	November 22, 1983	8-C06
The Law Review is behind schedule, but Golden is sidelined with pneumonia. Second-in-command Shaw seizes the opportunity for a power play, but it backfires. Law Review activities are further complicated when, while their new computer is being installed and tested, a power failure threatens their precious deadline - until they enlist the help of the "wonks" (computer experts).
30	8	"Mrs. Hart"	Corey Allen	John Jay Osborn, Jr.	May 22, 1984	2-V02
Hart and Connie's relationship has progressed to the point where Hart considers marriage. Before Connie can sort this out, she is awarded a Rhodes Scholarship and must choose between going to Europe or staying with Hart. Elsewhere, a new female 1-L moves into the dorm and becomes buddies with Bell, although he would like it to be more than that. (After a six-month hiatus following episode 7, The Paper Chase returned with some major changes. Three new female regular characters were added, and Connie Lehman was written out of the series.)
31	9	"Tempest in a Pothole"	Mark Cullingham	Peter Dixon	May 29, 1984	2-V03
The hapless Willis Bell takes a spill on his bicycle and breaks an arm. He sues the city, alleging negligence in street maintenance. He reluctantly subpoenas Kingsfield, who saw the accident. All of Bell's dorm mates pull for him - all except Soloway, his personal "doubting Thomas". Meanwhile, Mrs. Nottingham, Kingsfield's secretary, feels unappreciated for her more than 30 years of service and accepts a promotion to the dean's office.
32	10	"Labor of Love"	Jack Bender	Paul Eric Myers; Judy Merl	June 5, 1984	2-V01
Hart convinced the all-work/no-play Golden to think about something besides the Law Review and join him for a beer at Ernie's. There Golden and Hart meet Kathleen and Iris, and soon Golden and Kathleen hit it off. She is looking for a future husband, but eventually realizes Golden is married to his work.
33	11	"Burden of Proof"	Corey Allen	Paul L. Ehrmann	June 12, 1984	2-V07
As an intern for the overworked public defender (Gregory Sierra), Hart is assigned to defend the man who mugged Professor Kingsfield.
34	12	"War of the Wonks" "Machine"	Arthur Allan Seidelman	John Jay Osborn, Jr.	June 19, 1984	2-V09
The law students and the "wonks" (computer science students) battle over computer time. Someone gets the bright idea to challenge the computer to prepare a case note faster than a law student, with the loser giving up their computer time. The law students lose, and Kingsfield has to come to the rescue and challenge the computer himself.
35	13	"Limits"	Jack Bender	Robert Lewin	June 26, 1984	2-V05
Ford tries to stop classmates who want to petition for the replacement of a longtime professor (David Opatoshu) they suspect is showing signs of senility. Ford, having witnessed the problem in his own grandfather and enduring his devastation at being removed from the family's firm, has sympathy and wants to find a kinder way to resolve the problem. He goes to Kingsfield for help, who denies it is an issue and chastises him. However, Kingsfield plays chess with Professor Grey and in beating him easily discovers they are right. Eventually he offers him an emeritus position, and Grey resigns from teaching. Hart tries to develop a better relationship with his ultra-competitive (and beautiful) Law Review rival, Harriman.
36	14	"Hart Goes Home"	Jack Bender	Joe S. Landon	July 10, 1984	2-V08
Hart goes home to Minnesota for his sister Vicky's wedding, even though he has real-life work he is doing for Kingsfield. Since Golden has assigned Harriman to cover for Hart, Hart spends a lot of time on the phone with her and not so much time visiting with his family. Although his parents see this is due to his responsibilities, his younger sister views it as his lack of interest in being with his family.
37	15	"Judgment Day" "Tenure"	Nick Havinga	Paul L. Ehrmann; Marshall Goldberg	July 17, 1984	2-V10
Four professors are up for two tenured positions, with various faculty members each jockeying for "their man". Professor Peterson (John Rubinstein) is young, hip, and well-liked by the 3-L students (including Golden), but he lacks the necessary publishing credits. Golden offers to help by publishing Peterson's article in the Law Review, but his submission is not up to the usual standards, even after a re-write.
38	16	"My Dinner with Kingsfield"	Corey Allen	Lee Kalcheim	July 24, 1984	2-V04
A snowstorm strands Kingsfield on his way to the airport. When he knocks on the nearest door to use the phone, Hart answers. When they learn the airport is closed, Kingsfield stays for dinner and conversation. Across town, Mrs. Nottingham steps into Ernie's Tavern, seeking shelter while waiting for the bus. Ford and Bell invite her to their table, and the three of them spend the evening consuming brandy.
39	17	"The Advocates"	Jack Bender	Jack Bender	August 7, 1984	2-V03
Professors Kingsfield and Reese clash over funding for the latter's unconventional course, which teaches courtroom tactics and presentation using video taping. When Hart and his nemesis Harriman are chosen as two of the finalists to represent their school in a national moot court contest, Kiernan advises him that he is too stiff. Hart enrolls in Reese's class, only to find Harriman there as well. Bell takes bets on the outcome. Reese helps Vivian Conway overcome her trouble expressing herself in Kingsfield's class to demonstrate the utility of his course.
40	18	"Not Prince Hamlet" "Rashomon"	Lynn Roth	Lee Kalcheim	August 14, 1984	2-V12
When Marshall Weatherly takes his own life after flunking Kingsfield's test, his grieving lawyer father seeks out Marshall's friends to try to figure out why. He learns that his white son was seriously involved with African-American Conway, but was afraid to tell him. He also speaks with Kiernan, Bell, and Hart, the last people to see his son, trying to decipher Marshall's cryptic suicide message: "Not Prince Hamlet". Finally, Kingsfield recognizes the quotation. Each person the father interviews has a different viewpoint of the same scene, revisited over and over again in flashbacks (a technique notably used in the film Rashomon).
41	19	"Billy Pierce"	Corey Allen	Max Eisenberg	August 21, 1984	2-V11
Nervous first-year students prepare for Kingsfield's exam, among them Billy Pierce (Lynn Swann), a struggling, famous ex-football player. A thief makes off with a copy of the test undetected the night before. Bell tutors Kiernan on the wrong subjects, with disastrous results. She gets a D, while others, including Pierce, get suspiciously high marks. When the theft is discovered, Bell investigates, but is unable to solve the mystery, so a disappointed Kingsfield has no choice but to discard the grades, much to Kiernan's relief. (The secondary opening credits are accompanied by highlights of Pittsburgh Steelers games of the 1970s.)

=== Season 3 (1985) ===
No. overall	No. in season	Title	Directed by	Written by	Original release date	Prod. code
42	1	"Decisions: Parts 1 & 2"	Ralph Senensky	John Jay Osborn, Jr.	May 11, 1985	3-M03
43	2	"Decisions: Parts 1 & 2"	Ralph Senensky	John Jay Osborn, Jr.	May 11, 1985	3-M06
Golden is interviewing for a clerkship at the U.S. Supreme Court but struggles with the task of recommending to Kingsfield his successor as president. Rita Harriman wants the job very badly, but so does Hart. Ford has mixed feelings about whether he wants his "perfect" younger brother to follow him to this school. Kingsfield becomes involved with trying to persuade a former head of the Securities and Exchange Commission to give up her desire to spend more time with her grandchildren and instead join the faculty. Golden has some misgivings about whether clerking at the Supreme Court is really the best direction for his career. At the start of the third year, Hart becomes president of Law Review and proposes a controversial approach to the first issue. He also struggles with leadership issues. His problems are compounded by an article request from Kingsfield that does not fit with the theme of the issue. Professor Tyler begins classes, and clashes with Kingsfield over admitting Bell to her class, since Bell has not completed a prerequisite. Bell becomes dorm advisor to the new group of first-year students. Mature new student Rose struggles to adjust to law school after raising a family. Ford's younger brother Tom is a first-year student, and there is friction, as the brothers have always been very competitive. Harriman is chosen by Hart to run the writing competition, whereby students without the best grades have an alternative method to apply for Law Review. Ford enters the competition, but Harriman finds his submission weak.
44	3	"Pressure"	Alf Kjellin	Irving Pearlberg	June 29, 1985	3-M03
A stressed-out student physically attacks a professor who won't give him an extension on an assignment. When he is expelled, Tom Ford assists with his appeal. Meanwhile, Rose dates Soloway's father.
45	4	"Laura's Struggle"	Sharron Miller	Joe S. Landon	July 6, 1985	3-M04
Laura is having trouble adjusting to the added time commitments of Law Review while keeping up with her regular courses. All her friends are disturbed by the changes in her personality but she denies that anything is wrong except that she's busy. Laura does a poor job in her preparation of a note for the Law Review and Hart convinces other Review members that she should be put on probation instead of kicking her off altogether. Bell tries repeatedly to talk with her and offer help and support, but her protests continue. Hart is forced to redo Laura's work for the Law Review note when she hits bottom. Professor Tyler engages Kingsfield and a visitor from Kingsfield's early days at Oxford in a special seminar which is a debate about whether the American or English view about a certain controversial law is correct.
46	5	"Security"	Ernest A. Losso	Marshall Goldberg	July 13, 1985	3-M12
Hart decides to invite highly distinguished lawyer and legendary Law Review president Jeremy Brooks (John Randolph) to be the keynote speaker at a prestigious banquet. However, Hart discovers that Brooks is retired and uses a wheelchair, due to a stroke, and has been impoverished by medical costs incurred by his late wife. Hart, his pals and Brooks's old friend Kingsfield battle the bureaucracy over Medicare benefits for him. Brooks's pride makes him resent their efforts, but Kingsfield argues that it will benefit many other people in his position, and Brooks becomes actively involved.
47	6	"Free Advice"	Gilbert Moses	Marley Sims, Stephen Schneck	July 20, 1985	3-M07
Tom casually gives some free legal advice to an auto mechanic (John Goodman), which is illegal for law students. The bad advice gets the mechanic evicted, whereupon he gets an opportunistic district attorney to press charges, which could end Tom's legal career. Hart gets Golden to defend Tom.
48	7	"The Day Kingsfield Missed Class"	Ralph Senensky	Bruce Franklin Singer, Max Eisenberg	July 27, 1985	3-M08
Kingsfield stays away from the campus for an entire day without notifying anyone to teach his students about the concept of breach of contract in an unorthodox way. He does not count on a potential major donor to the school showing up a week early to see him, but everything works out in the end.
49	8	"The Source"	Georg Stanford Brown	Paul L. Ehrmann	August 10, 1985	3-M02
A former law student, now a law clerk for a liberal state supreme court justice, tells a Law Review staffer that his boss is voting the way the conservative governor wants in close cases in return for his appointment. Kingsfield vetoes publishing Hart's article about it in Law Review because the source insists on remaining anonymous. Then the justice casts the deciding vote on a death penalty case.
50	9	"The Choice"	Ralph Senensky	Paul Eric Myers, Judy Merl	August 17, 1985	3-M01
Ford's girlfriend discovers she is pregnant. She decides to get an abortion, to avoid missing school and losing her scholarship, but he wants a say in the decision. Some of the law students become uneasy when they are invited to socialize with the faculty at a tea.
51	10	"It's Only a Show"	Lynn Roth	Lee Kalcheim	August 24, 1985	3-M10
Bell takes charge of an annual variety show put on by the law students after one more-qualified person flunks out and another is injured. Laura and Martin Zeiss become romantically involved as they rehearse a comedy skit. Meanwhile, Kingsfield flies to Los Angeles. On the night of the show, Soloway cannot sing the song he wrote, due to over practicing, so Rose takes his place and is a hit. Laura breaks up with Zeiss when he becomes jealous of Rose's success. With a shortage of acts, Bell has to do his impersonation of Kingsfield, unaware until too late that the professor has returned and is in the audience.
52	11	"The Big D"	Ralph Senensky	Susan Miller Lazar	September 3, 1985	3-M11
Rose is stunned and upset when Arnie, her dermatologist husband (Herb Edelman) of 25 years (and three daughters), files for divorce during their trial separation. The law students band together to assist her in representing herself in the proceedings. They discover that Arnie has severely undervalued his declared assets.
53	12	"Lasting Impressions"	John Herzfeld	Mann Rubin	September 10, 1985	3-M09
The senior partner of Golden's law firm brings him aboard a major libel suit on behalf of John Cromwell (William Schallert), an antisemitic client, when the partner's associate undergoes surgery. It is an important assignment for someone as junior as Golden, but Cromwell complains that he is too pushy and unlikable for the jury and wants him off the case. A popular janitor (Scatman Crothers) is eager to enjoy his retirement, but he finds himself missing the students and faculty of the university. Laura and Ford realize his pride will not let him ask for his job back ... without some maneuvering on their part.

=== Season 4 (1986) ===
No. overall	No. in season	Title	Directed by	Written by	Original release date	Prod. code
54	1	"A Wounded Hart"	Ralph Senensky	Eric Cohen	June 28, 1986	4-M01
Harriman suffers two blows to her psyche. First, her long-distance boyfriend shows up unexpectedly and tells her he is marrying someone else. Then Kingsfield agrees with Hart that her note for Law Review is inadequate. Vulnerable, she has a one-night stand with Hart. He is bothered when he discovers that the encounter means more to him than it does to her. Meanwhile, Soloway has insomnia, so he tries therapy. Under hypnosis, he believes he is the reincarnation of St. Thomas More, but he had merely seen the movie A Man for All Seasons recently.
55	2	"Mistaken Identity"	James Stephens	Stephen Schneck	July 5, 1986	4-M02
Ford becomes the victim of identify theft and is arrested by police and jailed. Although friends Hart, Golden, and even Kingsfield rescue him, his brush with reality leaves his presumption of the rectitude of the legal system badly shaken.
56	3	"Honor"	John Herzfeld	John Jay Osborn, Jr.	July 12, 1986	4-M04
Zeiss is upset about not graduating with honors. He finds out that there is a second grading system he was unaware of; in addition to letter grades, there are also numerical ones. Based on the latter, he missed out by the narrowest of margins. After being rejected by a law firm he really wants to work for, he files a lawsuit against the law school over its grading procedures. He loses, but Kingsfield contacts the recruiter, a former student of his, and Zeiss is offered a job. Mrs. Nottingham gets sued. Everyone learns to settle, some with Kingsfield's nudging.
57	4	"Suppressed Desires"	Lynn Roth	Lynne Kelsey	July 19, 1986	4-M03
Tensions mount as finals approach. The law students decide to have a "suppressed desire" party, where everyone dresses up in a costume depicting what they wanted to be in life, just to relieve the pressure. Laura is having second thoughts about becoming a lawyer. A chance encounter with an art professor (Theodore Bikel) and an open art contest (in which she takes third place) reawakens her interest in that area.
58	5	"Graduation: Parts 1 & 2"	Ralph Senensky	Joe S. Landon	August 9, 1986	4-M05
59	6	"Graduation: Parts 1 & 2"	Ralph Senensky	Joe S. Landon	August 9, 1986	4-M06
The soon-to-be graduates ponder their futures after law school. Hart is weighing working for a private firm or accepting a federal court clerkship when Professor Tyler approaches him with a third option: applying for a faculty opening. Kingsfield opposes his nomination because he feels Hart lacks the experience necessary, and ultimately prevails. Bell, after numerous rejections, finally gets a job offer, only to have the firm break up. Later, however, one of the former partners hires him. Laura tells Hart that she will not return for her third year; she is going to be an artist. Tom and Rose's study group breaks up due to the cutthroat nature of another member. Hart gives the commencement speech.
