= Barbara Ras =

American poet, translator and publisher (born 1949)

Barbara Ras (born 1949 in New Bedford, Massachusetts) is an American poet, translator and publisher. Her most recent poetry collection is The Blues of Heaven (University of Pittsburgh Press, 2021), which was preceded by The Last Skin (Penguin Books, 2010), One Hidden Stuff (Penguin Books, 2006), and her first collection Bite Every Sorrow (Louisiana State University Press, 1998).

== Life ==
She graduated from Simmons College, and University of Oregon. She taught writing at Warren Wilson College.

She has been on the editorial staffs of Wesleyan University Press, the University Press of New England, the University of California Press, North Point Press and Sierra Club Books. She was Senior Editor acquiring environmental books for the University of Georgia Press. She was the Director of Trinity University Press in San Antonio, Texas from 2002 to 2015. She lives with her husband; they have a daughter (b. 1984).

She has traveled extensively in Latin America and lived for periods of time in Colombia and Costa Rica.

Her work has appeared in literary journals and magazines including The New Yorker, Boulevard, Massachusetts Review, Prairie Schooner, American Scholar, and Spoon River Poetry Review.

She will be a Featured Presenter at the 2010 AWP.

== Honors and awards ==
- 1997 Walt Whitman Award, chosen by C. K. Williams
- 2009 Guggenheim Fellowship
- Georgia Author of the Year Award for poetry.
- Ascher Montandon Award
- Kate Tufts Discovery Award
- honors from the National Writers Union, Villa Montalvo, San Jose Poetry Center.

== Published works ==
Poetry Collections

- Bite Every Sorrow. Louisiana State University Press. 1998. ISBN 978-0-8071-2264-8.
- One Hidden Stuff. Penguin Books. 2006. ISBN 978-0-14-303785-9.
- The Last Skin. Penguin Books. 2010. ISBN 978-0-14-311697-4.
- The Blues of Heaven. Pittsburgh University Press. 2021. ISBN 978-0-8229-6654-8.

Translations

- Barbara Ras, ed. (1994). Costa Rica: A Traveler's Literary Companion. Whereabouts Press. ISBN 978-1-883513-00-9.
