= Edward Henry Warren =

American law educator (1873–1945)

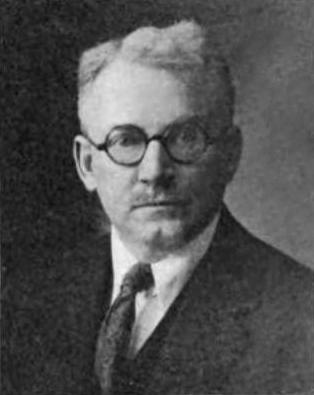
- Born: January 11, 1873; Worcester, Massachusetts, US
- Died: July 24, 1945 (aged 72); Saint Andrews, New Brunswick, Canada
- Education: Worcester Academy; Harvard Law School
- Occupation: Lawyer

Edward Henry Warren (January 11, 1873 – July 24, 1945), nicknamed "Bull", was an American lawyer, the Weld Professor of Law and the Story Professor of Law at Harvard Law School. There he briefly taught second–year equity law and property law until 1908, and then first–year property law for the rest of his academic career and third–year corporate law until 1929. He taught from 1904 to 1929 and 1932 to 1943. He was the acting dean during 1920–1921.

== Early life and education ==
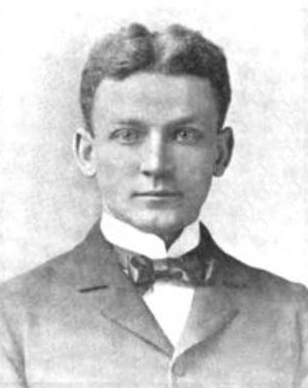
As a Harvard undergraduate, c. 1895

Warren was born in Worcester, Massachusetts. After graduating from Worcester Academy, he entered Harvard College in the class of 1895. There he was the editor-in-chief of The Harvard Crimson. He originally studied sociology and economics, but eventually moved "to the more solid law", due to its more accurate nature. He entered Harvard Law School in 1897. He received an LL.B. in 1900.

== Career ==
Warren practised law in the office of Strong and Cadwalader until 1904, when he became an assistant professor of law at Harvard. He received the title of professor in 1909, Story Professor in 1913, and Weld Professor in 1919. Warren also opened a law office in Boston in 1908 in partnership with Theodore Hoague, Henry James Jr. and Albert F. Bigelow, practising law until 1921. He taught Public Utilities and Evidence in 1914–1919 to help out the school during a time of strain. In 1923 he had a sabbatical year.

Warren lived at the Colonial Club (predecessor of the Faculty Club) until 1910, when he married. In 1929, he retired from Harvard and moved to Norfolk. However, due to underemployment, he moved from this estate back to the United States and resumed teaching. He had a daughter. Bridge, walking, and travel were his primary hobbies. He died in Saint Andrews on July 24, 1945.

Former students described his classes as very rigorous and demanding, where he tended to be sarcastic, yet fair and appreciative of hard work. He was described as hospitable and sincere outside of the classroom. This was in accordance with his belief that law students need "Spartan training" and toughening to become lawyers, as he considered collegiate education to be loose.

He is one of the possible models for the character of Kingsfield in the novel The Paper Chase.

== Bibliography ==
- Select Cases and Other Authorities on the Law of Property (1919)
- Select Cases and Other Authorities on the Law of Private Corporations (1929)
- Corporate Advantages Without Incorporation (1929)
- The Right of Margin Customers Against Wrongdoing Stock-brokers and Some Other Problems in the Modern Law of Pledge (1941)
- Spartan Education (1942) – autobiography
