= The Brothers K =

1992 novel by David James Duncan

- Author: David James Duncan
- Language: English
- Genre: Fiction
- Publication date: 1992
- Publication place: United States
- Media type: Print
- Preceded by: The River Why

The Brothers K is a 1992 novel by David James Duncan, an author, fisherman, and environmental advocate from the Pacific Northwest. It builds on the sporting and spiritual themes of The River Why, Duncan's first book, but on a much larger canvas, focusing on an entire family instead of a single protagonist. Duncan uses multiple points of view to reinforce this effect by including material supposedly written by different family members in the broad narrative by Kincaid Chance. The novel tells the story of the Chance family as they pass through the turbulent waters of Papa Chance's minor league baseball career and the upheavals of the Vietnam War. It is also a deeply religious novel about love and family and spiritual growth and the difference between church and religion. The title is a reference to Dostoevsky's The Brothers Karamazov and to the baseball abbreviation for a strikeout.

== Plot ==
Hugh Chance, known as Papa by his children, is a former MLB pitcher who has settled down with his wife in the mill town of Camas, Washington. They have six children. Everett Chance, the eldest, is a natural politician and powerful speaker whose passionate opposition to the Vietnam war creates much of the family tension in the book. He spends much time and effort pursuing a young Russian literature student named Natasha and finally wins her heart from draft exile in British Columbia by sending her an epic letter/novel. Everett does not have great natural athletic gifts but is a scrappy competitor. Second oldest, Peter Chance, is the intellectual brother who will study at Harvard and then in India. Though a natural athlete, Peter spends most of the book having renounced gifts of the body in his dogged pursuit of spiritual growth. After being kidnapped by con artists on an Indian train he finds enlightenment and he returns to the family in their hour of need. Irwin is an innocent, possessing a childlike devotion to faith. He is sent to the war in Vietnam, where he is changed forever. Kincaid Chance, the youngest brother, narrates the book yet is the member of the family we finally learn the least about.
