= The Paper Chase (film) =

1973 film by James Bridges

- Theatrical release poster
- Directed by: James Bridges
- Screenplay by: James Bridges
- Based on: The Paper Chase; 1971 novel by John Jay Osborn Jr.
- Produced by: Rodrick Paul; Robert C. Thompson
- Starring: Timothy Bottoms; Lindsay Wagner; John Houseman
- Cinematography: Gordon Willis
- Edited by: Walter Thompson
- Music by: John Williams
- Distributed by: 20th Century Fox
- Release date: October 16, 1973
- Running time: 111 minutes
- Country: United States
- Language: English
- Box office: $3.6 million

The Paper Chase is a 1973 American comedy-drama film starring Timothy Bottoms, Lindsay Wagner, and John Houseman, which was directed by James Bridges.

Based on John Jay Osborn Jr.'s 1971 novel The Paper Chase, it tells the story of James Hart, a first-year law student at Harvard Law School, his experiences with Professor Charles Kingsfield, a brilliant and demanding contract law instructor, and his relationship with Kingsfield's daughter. Houseman earned an Academy Award for Best Supporting Actor for his performance as the professor. Houseman later reprised the role in a TV series of the same name that lasted four seasons, following Hart, played by James Stephens, through his three years of law school.

== Plot ==
At Harvard Law School, James T. Hart attends his first day in a contract law course taught by Professor Charles W. Kingsfield Jr. When Kingsfield immediately delves into the material using the Socratic method, Hart is totally unprepared and is humiliated when Kingsfield asks him the first question. After class, Hart throws up in the bathroom.

Hart is invited to join a study group with five others:

- Ford, the fifth generation of Fords at Harvard Law School
- Kevin Brooks, a married man with a photographic memory but lacking in analytical skills
- Anderson
- Bell, who is devoted to property law
- O'Connor

Each member of the group agrees to focus on a specific course and write a synopsis of their notes to share with each other before the final exams. Hart chooses contract law.

While out getting pizza, Hart is asked by a young woman, Susan Fields, to walk her home, as she says she feels uncomfortable about a man who has been following her. Hart returns to her house soon after and asks her on a date, after which they begin a complicated relationship: she resents the time he devotes to his studies and his fascination with Kingsfield, while he expects her to provide him with considerable attention and wants a firm commitment. When Hart and a select few of his classmates are invited to a cocktail party hosted by Kingsfield, he is stunned to discover that Susan is Kingsfield's married daughter. She is, however, separated from her husband and eventually gets a divorce. She and Hart break up and get back together several times.

Hart categorizes his classmates into three groups: those who have given up; those who are trying but fear being called upon in class to respond to Kingsfield's questions; and the "upper echelon" who actively volunteer to answer. Hart strives to move from the second classification to the third, and succeeds as time goes on.

Hart eventually learns of the existence of the "Red Set", the archived and sealed personal notes that Harvard professors wrote when they were students, which are stored in a locked room of the library. Late one night, Hart and Ford break into the library to read Kingsfield's notes.

The mounting pressure gets to everyone as the course nears its end. Brooks attempts suicide and drops out of school. The study group is torn apart by personal bickering, with only three of the six members remaining. With final exams looming, Hart and Ford hole up in a hotel room for three days and study feverishly. On the last day of class, Hart and his classmates give Kingsfield a standing ovation. Later, when Susan brings Hart his mail at the beach, he climbs the highest rock, makes a paper airplane out of the unopened envelope containing his grades and sends it flying into the water.

The film is a faithful adaptation of the novel, although it adds two elements not in the book: Hart's first name and middle initial (James T.), and his final grade in contract law (93, an A).

== Cast ==
- Timothy Bottoms as James T. Hart
- Lindsay Wagner as Susan Fields
- John Houseman as Charles W. Kingsfield Jr.
- Graham Beckel as Ford
- James Naughton as Kevin Brooks
- Edward Herrmann as Anderson
- Craig Richard Nelson as Bell
- Bob Lydiard as O'Connor
- Lenny Baker as William Moss
- David Clennon as Toombs
- Regina Baff as Asheley Brooks
- Blair Brown as Miss Farranti

== Background ==
There are several possible inspirations for the character Charles W. Kingsfield Jr. The late Harvard Law professor Clark Byse is said to have been the inspiration for the character's position at Harvard Law School, though not the character's personality. According to John Houseman, the inspiration for Kingsfield was crusty professor Edward "Bull" Warren, also reflected in The Boston Globe in 2004. Houseman had noted that Kingsfield's behavior is actually a toned-down version of Warren's famous classroom rudeness, as enshrined in classroom lore, and recounted several examples of the professor's putdowns. Richard Alan Gordon, a long-time contracts professor at Georgetown University, is also said to have influenced the role.

James Bridges originally earmarked James Mason for the Kingsfield role, but he was unavailable. After attempts to cast Melvyn Douglas, Edward G. Robinson, John Gielgud, Paul Scofield, and other famous actors in the role, Bridges offered it to Houseman, who agreed to fly to Toronto (where the film's interior sequences were to be shot) for a screen test. Bridges called it "fabulous", and Houseman accepted the part, thus launching his film acting career. He had seldom acted before, but knew Bridges from the time he was a stage manager in Houseman's UCLA Professional Theater Group. Houseman then recommended Bridges as a writer for the television series Alfred Hitchcock Presents, for which Bridges wrote 18 teleplays before establishing himself as a motion picture writer-director.

== Production ==
The exterior shots of the Harvard Law School buildings were filmed on the Harvard Law School campus, and the library shots were filmed in the Harvard Andover library at the Harvard Divinity School. All interiors were shot on stages in Toronto. In a 1999 interview, Gordon Willis said production designer George Jenkins "reproduced the Harvard Law School in The Paper Chase beautifully." The hotel scene was filmed at the Windsor Arms Hotel. The scene of James Hart (Timothy Bottoms) and Ford (Graham Beckel) entering a building to take their final exam near the film's end was shot in front of the Law School's oldest building, iconic Austin Hall. Most of the extras for the Harvard Law School venue scenes were then current Harvard Law students, paid a $25 per diem by 20th Century Fox.

Willis shot The Paper Chase in anamorphic format due to the "schoolroom and the graphics in the film." He also commented on the cinematography, noting that the composition of the scenes with Houseman and Bottoms "related to who had command of the situation. We used huge close-ups of John, and demeaning shots of Timothy. Then as the movie goes along and Timothy begins to get on top of it, you'll notice the shot sizes begin to diminish on John and begin to get a little bit bigger on Timothy—until finally they are equal partners shooting back and forth."

== Reception ==
Vincent Canby wrote that the film "goes slowly soft like a waxwork on a hot day, losing the shape and substance that at the beginning have rightfully engaged our attention;" he concludes "it takes a long while for The Paper Chase to disintegrate, and there are some funny, intelligent sequences along the way, but by the end it has melted into a blob of clichés." Jay Cocks called it a movie of "some incidental pleasures and insights and a great deal of silliness:"

What [writer/director] Bridges catches best is the peculiar tension of the classroom, the cool terror that can be instilled by an academic skilled in psychological warfare. His Ivy League Olympian is Kingsfield, a professor of contract law who passes along scholarship with finely tempered disdain. In an original bit of casting, Kingsfield is played by veteran theater and film producer John Houseman. It is a forbidding, superb performance, catching not only the coldness of such a man but the patrician crustiness that conceals deep and raging contempt.

The University of Chicago Law School called Houseman's rendition of the Socratic method "over-the-top", telling prospective students:

John Houseman may have won an Oscar for his impressive performance, but if anyone ever did teach a law school class like his Professor Kingsfield, no one at Chicago does today. The Socratic Method is a valuable tool used to engage students in discussion and develop critical thinking skills. It is employed at Chicago to foster intellectual approaches to the law, rather than to intimidate or break down new students. Through probing questions, the method helps students delve into the core of the subject matter and encourages them to think critically.

Others disagreed; another reviewer found it accurate:

This is really the only serious flick about law school life. It's brooding and intense, perfectly capturing the dynamic between law professor and student. The movie is worth watching just for actor John Houseman's Academy Award-winning performance as Professor Kingsfield. Every school still has a professor that knows how to absolutely terrify the 1Ls — for us at UChicago, that was Richard "The Hammer" Helmholz. The Paper Chase's Professor Kingsfield is like a distillation every one of these scary arch-villain type professors.

One law professor, Ed Fallone, opined:

From the point of those of us who are law professors, it makes sense to criticize the oppressive law school environment reflected in the movie. However, from the point of view of current law students, the movie illustrates a heroic journey by the protagonist that they would like to emulate.

Roger Ebert gave the movie four stars and singled out the performances of Bottoms and Houseman for praise.

On review aggregator Rotten Tomatoes, the film has an approval rating of 78% based on 32 reviews, with an average rating of 7.1/10. On Metacritic, which sampled seven critic reviews and calculated a weighted average score of 67 out of 100, the film received "generally favorable reviews".

== Awards and nominations ==
Award	Category	Nominee(s)	Result	Ref.
Academy Awards	Best Supporting Actor	John Houseman	Won	
Academy Awards	Best Screenplay – Based on Material from Another Medium	James Bridges	Nominated	
Academy Awards	Best Sound	Donald O. Mitchell and Larry Jost	Nominated	
Golden Globe Awards	Best Supporting Actor – Motion Picture	John Houseman	Won	
National Board of Review Awards	Best Supporting Actor	John Houseman	Won	
New York Film Critics Circle Awards	Best Supporting Actor	John Houseman	Runner-up	
Writers Guild of America Awards	Best Drama – Adapted from Another Medium	James Bridges	Nominated	

- The American Film Institute has placed the film at #91 on its 100 Years...100 Cheers list.

== Television series ==
The film was followed by a television series that ran for one season on CBS (1978–79) and three seasons on Showtime (1983–1986).

== Cases in film ==
- Clark v. Meyer, 188 F. Supp. 2d 416, 2002 WL 338372
- Hawkins v. McGee, 84 N.H. 114 (1929)
- L. Albert & Son v. Armstrong Rubber Co., 178 F.2d 182 (2d Cir. 1949)

== See also ==
- List of American films of 1973
