= The Paper Chase (Osborn novel) =

1971 novel by John Jay Osborn Jr.

- First edition (Houghton Mifflin, 1971)
- Author: John Jay Osborn Jr.
- Language: English
- Publisher: Houghton Mifflin
- Publication date: 1971
- ISBN: 0-395-12670-3 (first edition)
- Dewey Decimal: 813.54
- LC Class: PZ4.O7694 Pap

The Paper Chase is a 1971 novel written by John Jay Osborn Jr.. The book tells the story of Hart, a first-year law student at Harvard, and his experiences with Professor Charles Kingsfield, a brilliant and demanding contracts instructor whom he both idolizes and finds incredibly intimidating.

The novel inspired a 1973 film and then a television series, which ran from 1978 to 1979 and from 1983 to 1986.

Osborn wrote the novel as a third-year student at Harvard Law School. William Alfred, a Harvard humanities professor and playwright, coached him in writing the book.

== Plot ==
The story centers on Hart, a young law student from Minnesota who attends Harvard Law School and becomes obsessed with one of his teachers, Professor Charles W. Kingsfield Jr. Hart becomes an expert on Kingsfield's subject, contracts; he reads everything about the subject, including all of Kingsfield's papers, most of which are not on the reading list. He goes so far as to break into the law library to read Kingsfield's original law school notes. Hart becomes such an expert that Kingsfield asks him to contribute to a paper.

At the same time, he begins a relationship with Susan Field, who turns out to be Kingsfield's daughter. Susan stands aloof from the law school rat race and dismisses all the things Hart cares about most.

After much effort preparing for final exams, Hart's grades are delivered to him, but he simply makes a paper airplane out of the envelope, and sends it sailing into the Atlantic Ocean without looking at it.

== Professor Charles W. Kingsfield Jr ==
Professor Charles W. Kingsfield Jr. is one of the key characters in the novel, film and television series. Kingsfield is an imperious, highly respected (and feared) professor of contracts at Harvard Law School, known for his unrelenting use of the Socratic method on his students. Kingsfield was a law student at Harvard, as shown by the presence of his own class notes in the institution's archives. Kingsfield has a daughter with a fiercely independent personality.

During an event at Harvard Law School to commemorate the fortieth anniversary of the book's release, Osborn said that the character was a composite of several of his professors at Harvard Law School, saying, "It wasn't like it was hard to find role models." Many Harvard Law graduates believe the character to be a composite of Contracts professor Clark Byse and Property Law professor A.J. Casner, legendary intimidating users of the Socratic method. Osborn has stated that Contracts was his favorite law school course. Actor John Houseman, who played the role in the film and television series, said that he based his performance, in part, on stories he was told by former students of Edward Henry Warren, a professor at the law school from 1904 to 1945. Warren, who taught a first-year property law course, was famous at the school for his sarcastic comments during lectures and intimidating manner. Houseman's performance was also based on his experience as a professor and director of the drama department at the Juilliard School.

== 40th-anniversary edition ==
In 2010, a 40th-anniversary edition of The Paper Chase was released by Peninsula Road Press, which contains a new preface. This edition is the only one prepared by the author.

== Adaptations ==
=== Film ===
According to Osborn, the 1973 film is based "almost word for word" on the novel. It starred John Houseman as Kingsfield and Timothy Bottoms as Hart.

=== Television series ===
CBS aired a one-hour drama series in the 1978–1979 season based on the movie. John Houseman reprised his movie role, and James Stephens played Hart. In 1983, pay cable network Showtime brought back the show with both Houseman and Stephens. At the end of three seasons on Showtime, Hart finally graduated.
