= David James Duncan =

American novelist & essayist (born 1952)

- Born: 1952 (age 73–74); Portland, Oregon, U.S.
- Education: Portland State University
- Occupations: Novelist, essayist
- Writing career
- Notable works: The River Why (1983); The Brothers K (1992)

David James Duncan (born 1952) is an American novelist and essayist, best known for his two bestselling novels, The River Why (1983) and The Brothers K (1992). Both novels received the Pacific Northwest Booksellers award; The Brothers K was a New York Times Notable Book in 1992 and won a Best Books Award from the American Library Association. His third novel, Sun House, was released by Little, Brown and Company on August 8, 2023.

== Film adaptation ==
In 2008, The River Why was adapted into a "low-budget film" of the same name starring William Hurt and Amber Heard. On April 30, 2008, the film rights to The River Why became the subject of a lawsuit by Duncan alleging copyright infringement, among other issues. The lawsuit has been settled and Duncan has said, "I engaged in a three-year legal battle against the producers of the film over their handling of my film rights. That battle was settled last fall. My name is off the film, Sierra Club's name is off the film, and the rights have returned to me. I tried to remove my title from their film, too, but the federal magistrate in San Francisco let them keep it".

== Other works ==
Duncan has written a collection of short stories, River Teeth (1996), and a memoir of sorts, My Story As Told By Water (2001). God Laughs and Plays: Churchless Sermons in Response to the Preachments of the Fundamentalist Right was published in 2001. An essay, "Bird Watching as a Blood Sport," appeared in Harper's Magazine in 1998; Duncan wrote the foreword to Thoreau on Water: Reflecting Heaven (2001). An essay, "A Mickey Mantle Koan: The Obstinate Grip of an Autographed Baseball," appeared in Harper's Magazine in 1992.

== Personal life ==
Duncan was born in Portland, Oregon and lives in Missoula, Montana in Missoula County, Montana. He has written op-ed pieces in support of preservation of Montana's Blackfoot River. His papers are held in the Sowell Family Collection in Literature, Community, and the Natural World, part of the Southwest Collection/Special Collections Library at Texas Tech University.
