= ABC Theater =

Television series

- Also known as: ABC Theatre; ABC Theatre of the Month
- Genre: Anthology
- Country of origin: United States
- Original language: English

Original release
- Network: ABC
- Release: December 19, 1972

ABC Theater is an American television anthology series that aired on ABC and featured dramatic presentations over a period of 12 years. Although some sources indicate the series began in 1974, ABC lists the first production in 1972, with irregular broadcasts until 1984.

Directors for the series of television movies included George Schaefer, Stanley Kramer, Joseph Papp, George Cukor, José Quintero, Daniel Petrie, Randal Kleiser and Delbert Mann.

Writers contributing original material for the series included James Costigan, Alice Childress, Lonne Elder III and Loring Mandel.

In 1973, ABC shared in a joint Peabody Award with NBC and CBS "for their outstanding contributions to entertainment through an exceptional year of televised drama." The award particularly noted the ABC Theater productions of The Glass Menagerie and Pueblo.

== Selected episodes ==
Episode	Airdate	Cast	Major Awards	Director	Writer
If You Give a Dance, You Gotta Pay the Band	12/19/1972	Donna M. Bryan, Georgia Burke, Laurence Fishburne, Moses Gunn, Albert Hall		Fred Coe	Stanley L. Gray
Long Day's Journey Into Night	03/10/1973	Laurence Olivier, Constance Cummings, Denis Quilley	Laurence Olivier, Emmy for Outstanding Single Performance by a Lead Actor	Peter Wood	Eugene O'Neill
Pueblo	03/29/1973	Hal Holbrook, Ronny Cox, Andrew Duggan, Stephen Elliott	Hal Holbrook, Emmy for Outstanding Actor in a Drama	Anthony Page	Stanley R. Greenberg
The Glass Menagerie	12/16/1973	Katharine Hepburn, Sam Waterston, Joanna Miles, Michael Moriarty	Joanna Miles, Emmy for Outstanding Supporting Actress in Drama; Michael Moriarty, Emmy for Outstanding Supporting Actor in Drama	Anthony Harvey	Tennessee Williams
F. Scott Fitzgerald and 'The Last of the Belles'	01/07/1974	Richard Chamberlain, Blythe Danner, Susan Sarandon		George Schaefer	James Costigan
Judgment: The Trial of Julius and Ethel Rosenberg	01/28/1974	Allan Arbus, Herschel Bernardi, Barbara Colby		Stanley Kramer	Harry Kleiner
Wedding Band	04/24/1974	Ruby Dee, J.D. Cannon, Eileen Heckart		Joseph Papp	Alice Childress
The Missiles of October	12/18/1974	William Devane, Martin Sheen, Howard Da Silva, Ralph Bellamy		Anthony Page	Stanley R. Greenberg
Ceremonies in Dark Old Men	01/06/1975	J. Eric Bell, Godfrey Cambridge, Rosalind Cash, Robert Hooks, Glynn Turman			
Judgment: The Court Martial of Lieutenant William Calley	01/12/1975	Tony Musante, Richard Basehart, Harrison Ford		Stanley Kramer	Henry Denker
Love Among the Ruins	03/06/1975	Katharine Hepburn, Laurence Olivier, Colin Blakely	Peabody Award; Katharine Hepburn, Emmy for Outstanding Actress in a Special; Laurence Olivier, Emmy for Outstanding Actor in a Special; George Cukor, Emmy for Outstanding Directing in a Special; James Costigan, Emmy for Outstanding Writing in a Special (Original teleplay)	George Cukor	James Costigan
I Will Fight No More Forever	04/14/1975	James Whitmore, Sam Elliott, Ned Romero		Richard T. Heffron	Theodore Strauss
A Moon for the Misbegotten	05/27/1975	Jason Robards, Colleen Dewhurst, Ed Flanders	Ed Flanders, Emmy for Outstanding Single Performance by a Supporting Actor in a Special		
Eleanor and Franklin	01/11 & 01/12/1976	Jane Alexander, Edward Herrmann, Rosemary Murphy	Peabody Award; Emmy for Outstanding Drama Special; Rosemary Murphy, Emmy for Outstanding Single Performance by a Supporting Actress in a Special; Daniel Petrie, Emmy for Outstanding Directing in a Special; James Costigan, Emmy for Outstanding Writing in a Special (Original teleplay)	Daniel Petrie	James Costigan
Green Eyes	01/03/1977	Paul Winfield, Rita Tushingham, Jonathan Goldsmith	Peabody Award; Humanitas Prize	John Erman	David Seltzer
Eleanor and Franklin: The White House Years	03/13/1977	Jane Alexander, Edward Herrmann, Priscilla Pointer, Blair Brown	Emmy for Outstanding Special (Tie with Sybil); Daniel Petrie, Emmy for Outstanding Directing in a Special	Daniel Petrie	James Costigan
Mary White	11/18/1977	Ed Flanders, Fionnula Flanagan, Tim Matheson, Kathleen Beller	Caryl Ledner, Emmy for Outstanding Writing in a Special (Adaptation)	Jud Taylor	Caryl Ledner
The Gathering	12/04/1977	Edward Asner, Maureen Stapleton	Emmy for Outstanding Special	Randal Kleiser	James Poe
Breaking Up	01/02/1978	Lee Remick, Granville Van Dusen		Delbert Mann	Loring Mandel
The Last Tenant	06/25/1978	Tony Lo Bianco, Lee Strasberg, Christine Lahti	George Rubino, Emmy for Outstanding Writing in a Special (Original teleplay)	Jud Taylor	George Rubino
Friendly Fire	04/22/1979	Carol Burnett, Ned Beatty, Sam Waterston, Timothy Hutton	Peabody Award; Emmy for Outstanding Special; Daniel Greene, Emmy for Outstanding Directing in a Limited Series or Special	David Greene	Fay Kanin
Attica	03/02/1980	Charles Durning, Morgan Freeman, George Grizzard	Marvin J. Chomsky, Emmy for Outstanding Directing in a Limited Series or a Special	Marvin J. Chomsky	James S. Henerson
The Women's Room	09/14/1980	Lee Remick, Ted Danson, Colleen Dewhurst, Patty Duke		Glenn Jordan	Carol Sobieski
The Shadow Box	12/28/1980	Joanne Woodward, Christopher Plummer, Valerie Harper, James Broderick	Humanitas Prize; Golden Globe Award for Best Motion Picture Made For Television	Paul Newman	Michael Cristofer
Don't Look Back: The Story of Leroy 'Satchel' Paige	05/31/1981	Louis Gossett Jr., Beverly Todd, Cleavon Little		Richard A. Colla	Ronald Rubin
The Elephant Man	01/04/1982	Philip Anglim, Kevin Conway, Penny Fuller	Penny Fuller, Emmy for Outstanding Supporting Actress in a Limited Series or a Special	Jack Hofsiss	Steve Lawson
Divorce Wars: A Love Story	03/01/1982	Tom Selleck, Jane Curtin, Candice Azzara	Humanitas Prize	Donald Wrye	Donald Wrye
My Body, My Child	04/12/1982	Vanessa Redgrave, Jack Albertson, Joseph Campanella, Stephen Elliott			
The Letter	05/03/1982	Lee Remick, Ronald Pickup, Jack Thompson			
Benny's Place	05/31/1982	Louis Gossett Jr., Cicely Tyson, Terry Alexander			
Who Will Love My Children?	02/14/1983	Ann-Margret, Frederic Forrest, Donald Moffat	Ann-Margret, Golden Globe Award for Best Performance by an Actress in a Mini-Series or Motion Picture Made for Television	John Erman	Michael Bortman
The Day After	11/20/1983	Jason Robards, JoBeth Williams, John Lithgow, Amy Madigan		Nicholas Meyer	Edward Hume
Heart of Steel	12/04/1983	Peter Strauss, Pamela Reed, John Doucette		Donald Wrye	Gary DeVore
Something About Amelia	01/09/1984	Ted Danson, Glenn Close, Roxana Zal	Emmy for Outstanding Drama/Comedy Special; Roxana Zal, Emmy for Outstanding Supporting Actress in a Limited Series or a Special; William Hanley, Emmy for Outstanding Writing in a Limited Series or a Special	Randa Haines	William Hanley
A Streetcar Named Desire	03/04/1984	Ann-Margret, Treat Williams, Beverly D'Angelo		John Erman	Oscar Saul
The Dollmaker	05/13/1984	Jane Fonda, Levon Helm, Amanda Plummer	Humanitas Prize; Jane Fonda, Emmy for Outstanding Actress in a Limited Series or a Special	Daniel Petrie	Susan Cooper; Hume Cronyn
Heartsounds	09/30/1984	James Garner, Mary Tyler Moore, Sam Wanamaker	Peabody Award	Glenn Jordan	Fay Kanin
Consenting Adult	02/04/1985	Martin Sheen, Marlo Thomas		Gilbert Cates	John McGreevey

== ABC Theater Award ==
In 1977, ABC Inc., established the “ABC Theater” Award. The award provided a grant to the National Playwrights Conference of the Eugene O'Neill Theater Center and a cash award of $10,000 to the winning playwright. The playwright's work was then telecast as an ABC Theater Presentation. Winners of the award have included George Rubino for The Last Tenant, Lee Hunkins for Hollow Image, Preston Ransone for King Crab, J. Rufus Caleb for Benny's Place and Phil Penningroth for Ghost Dancing.
