= The Nurses (TV series) =

American television series

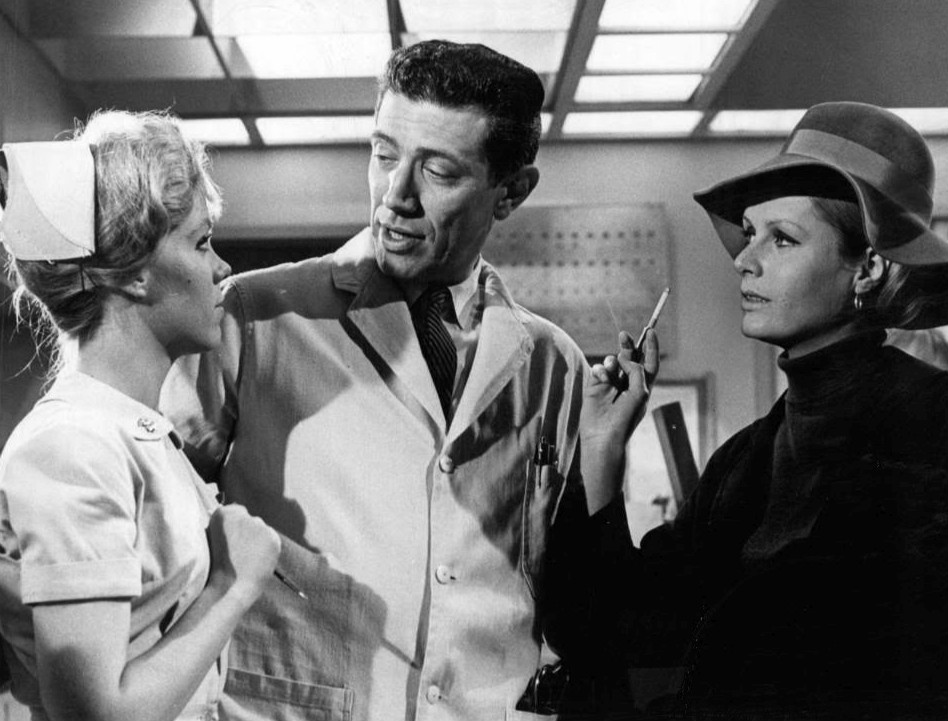
- Zina Bethune, Joseph Campanella, and guest star Diana Hyland in a scene from the program, 1965
- Also known as: The Doctors and the Nurses
- Genre: Medical drama
- Starring: Zina Bethune; Shirl Conway; Edward Binns; Stephen Brooks; Michael Tolan; Joseph Campanella
- Country of origin: United States
- No. of seasons: 3
- No. of episodes: 98

Production
- Executive producer: Herbert Brodkin
- Producers: Arthur Lewis (1962–1964); Arthur Joel Katz (1964–1965)
- Editor: Lyman Hallowell
- Running time: 60 minutes
- Production company: Plautus Productions

Original release
- Network: CBS
- Release: September 27, 1962 – May 11, 1965

The Nurses is a serialized primetime medical drama that was broadcast in the United States on CBS from September 27, 1962, to May 11, 1965. For the third and final season, the title was expanded to The Doctors and the Nurses, and it ran until 1965, when it was transformed into a half-hour daytime soap opera. The soap opera, also called The Nurses, ran on ABC from 1965 to 1967.

The series was spun-off from Arthur Hailey's 1959 CBS television play Diary of a Nurse, with Hailey receiving a royalty of $400 per episode despite doing no work on the series.

== Synopsis ==
The series is set in Alden General Hospital (patterned after Roosevelt Hospital) in New York City, and the primetime program starred Zina Bethune as Gail Lucas, the young nurse, and Shirl Conway as Liz Thorpe, her older nurse mentor.

Unlike most television dramas of the era, save for ABC's police drama Naked City (1958–1963) and the sitcom The Patty Duke Show (1963–1966), the series was filmed in New York City and not Hollywood. The show was mainly filmed at the Filmways and Pathe Studios in Manhattan.

The program was nominated for five Primetime Emmy Awards.

== Cast ==
- Zina Bethune as Gail Lucas
- Shirl Conway as Liz Thorpe
- Michael Tolan as Dr. Alex Tazinski (1964–1965)
- Joseph Campanella as Dr. Ted Steffen (1964–1965)

Other performers who appeared in episodes were Billie Allen, Margaret Barker, John Beal, Lane Bradbury, Sandra Church, Michael Conrad, Ruby Dee, Ivan Dixon, Dana Elcar, Elizabeth Frazier, Robert Gerringer, Arlene Golonka, George Grizzard, Vincent Guardino, Larry Haines, Barbara Harris, Joey Heatherton, William Hickey, Dustin Hoffman, Ellen Holly, Bernard Hughes, Kim Hunter, Diana Hyland, Albert Grant, Lee Grant, Judson Laire, John Lasell, Linda Lavin, Joseph Leon, Vivica Lindfors, Clifton James, Lincoln Kilpatrick, Jan Miner, Kermit Murdock, Peg Murray, Susan Oliver, Estelle Parsons, Jane Rose, Polly Rowles, Diana Sands, Zachary Scott, Fran Sharon, William Shatner, Martin Sheen, Joe Silver, Hilda Simms, Paul Stevens, Inger Stevens, Elaine Stritch, Florence Stanley, Michael Strong, and Dolph Sweet.

== Episodes ==
=== Season 1 (1962–63) ===
No. overall	No. in season	Title	Directed by	Written by	Original release date
1	1	"Night Shift"	David Greene	John Vlahos	September 27, 1962
2	2	"The Walls Came Tumbling Down"	Herbert Hirschman	Andy Lewis	October 4, 1962
3	3	"Fly, Shadow"	Herman Hoffman	Franklin Barton	October 11, 1962
4	4	"The Barbara Bowers Story"	Herman Hoffman	Al Brenner	October 18, 1962
5	5	"Dr. Lillian"	Don Richardson	Leon Tokatyan	October 25, 1962
6	6	"A Private Room"	Don Richardson	Irving Gaynor Neiman	November 1, 1962
7	7	"The Prisoner"	Elliot Silverstein	George Bellak	November 8, 1962
8	8	"A Strange and Distant Place"	Jose Quintero	Alvin Boretz	November 15, 1962
9	9	"Two Black Candles"	Jose Quintero	Norman Lessing	November 22, 1962
10	10	"The Lady Made of Stone"	Herman Hoffman	Alvin Boretz	November 29, 1962
11	11	"Frieda"	Lamont Johnson	Albert Ruben	December 6, 1962
12	12	"The Soft Touch"	Paul Stewart	John Hess	December 13, 1962
13	13	"Image of Angela"	Elliot Silverstein	Franklin Barton & Leon Tokatyan	December 27, 1962
14	14	"A Difference of Years"	Herman Hoffman	Andy Lewis	January 3, 1963
15	15	"Root of Violence"	John Newland	Mel Goldberg	January 10, 1963
16	16	"Many a Sullivan"	Herman Hoffman	Edward Adler & Albert Ruben	January 17, 1963
17	17	"Night Sounds"	Don Richardson	Larry Cohen	January 24, 1963
18	18	"The Third Generation"	Gerald Meyer	Stanley R. Greenberg	February 7, 1963
19	19	"The Life"	Don Richardson	Alvin Sargent	February 14, 1963
20	20	"Circle of Choice"	Gerald Meyer	George Bellak	February 21, 1963
21	21	"The Perfect Nurse"	John Peyser	Leon Tokatyan	February 28, 1963
22	22	"The Thunder of Ernie Bass"	Jose Quintero	Albert Ruben	March 7, 1963
23	23	"The Saturday Evening of Time"	David Greene	Alvin Sargent	March 14, 1963
24	24	"A Question of Mercy"	Stuart Rosenberg	Leon Tokatyan	March 21, 1963
25	25	"Party Girl"	Robert Gist & Stuart Rosenberg	Larry Cohen	March 28, 1963
26	26	"A Dark World"	Don Richardson	George Bellak	April 11, 1963
27	27	"You Could Die Laughing"	Herman Hoffman	George Bellak	April 18, 1963
28	28	"Choice Among Wrongs"	Paul Bogart	Andy Lewis	May 2, 1963
29	29	"Express Stop form Lenox Avenue"	Stuart Rosenberg	Adrian Spies	May 9, 1963
30	30	"Bitter Pill"	Herman Hoffman	Leonard Kanter	May 23, 1963
31	31	"Field of Battle"	Don Richardson	Albert Ruben	May 30, 1963
32	32	"They Are as Lions"	Alex March	Alvin Boretz	June 6, 1963

=== Season 2 (1963–64) ===
No. overall	No. in season	Title	Directed by	Written by	Original release date
33	1	"No Score"	Stuart Rosenberg	Arnold Perl	September 26, 1963
34	2	"Show Just Cause Why You Should Weep"	Lamont Johnson	Andy Lewis	October 3, 1963
35	3	"Escape Route"	Stuart Rosenberg	Richard McCracken	October 10, 1963
36	4	"The Gift"	Alex March	Larry Cohen	October 17, 1963
37	5	"Strike"	Elliot Silverstein	Albert Ruben	October 24, 1963
38	6	"The Horn of Plenty"	Alex March	Ted Apstein	October 31, 1963
39	7	"The Helping Hand"	Dick Donner	Art Wallace	November 7, 1963
40	8	"Ordeal"	Ralph Senensky	Harold Gast	November 14, 1963
41	9	"The Guilt of Molly Kane"	Paul Bogart	Alvin Sargent	November 21, 1963
42	10	"The Unwanted"	Charles S. Dubin	Stanley R. Greenberg	November 28, 1963
43	11	"Disaster Call"	Gerald Meyer	Richard McCracken	December 5, 1963
44	12	"To Spend, to Give, to Want"	Charles S. Dubin	Andy Lewis	December 12, 1963
45	13	"The Witch of the East Wing"	Gerald Meyer	Archie L. Tegland	December 19, 1963
46	14	"Rally Round, My Comrades"	Charles S. Dubin	Alvin Boretz	December 26, 1963
47	15	"The Seeing Heart"	Gerald Meyer	Alvin Boretz	January 2, 1964
48	16	"Credo"	Stuart Rosenberg	Leon Tokatyan	January 9, 1964
49	17	"The Rainbow Ride"	Paul Bogart	Leon Tokatyan	January 16, 1964
50	18	"The Intern Syndrome"	Ralph Senensky	Harold Gast	January 23, 1964
51	19	"Is There Room for Edward?"	Buzz Kulik	Alvin Sargent	January 30, 1964
52	20	"The Roamer"	Gerald Meyer	Harold Gast	February 6, 1964
53	21	"Nurse is a Feminine Noun"	Paul Bogart	Robert Van Scoyk	February 13, 1964
54	22	"The Imperfect Prodigy"	James Sheldon	Albert Ruben	February 20, 1964
55	23	"For the Mice and the Rabbits"	David Greene	Art Wallace	February 27, 1964
56	24	"Climb a Broken Ladder"	Elliot Silverstein	Art Wallace	March 12, 1964
57	25	"The Forever Child"	Paul Bogart	Alvin Boretz	March 19, 1964
58	26	"A King of Loving"	Alex Segal	Leon Tokatyan	April 2, 1964
59	27	"The Leopard Killer"	Tom Gries	Harold Gast	April 9, 1964
60	28	"The Gismo on the EEG"	Paul Bogart	Albert Ruben	April 16, 1964
61	29	"The Human Transaction"	Leonard Horn	Andy Lewis	April 23, 1964
62	30	"To All My Friends on Shore"	Stuart Rosenberg	Allan Sloane	May 7, 1964
63	31	"White on White"	Paul Bogart	Robert Van Scoyk	May 14, 1964
64	32	"A Postcard from Yucatan"	David Greene	Alvin Sargent	May 21, 1964
65	33	"The Bystanders"	Marvin Chomsky	Art Wallace	May 28, 1964
66	34	"Where Park Runs into Vreeland"	Lamont Johnson	Allan Sloane	June 11, 1964
67	35	"The Warrior"	Buzz Kulik	Stanley R. Greenberg	June 18, 1964
68	36	"The Love of a Smart Operator"	Paul Bogart	Harold Gast	June 25, 1964

=== Season 3: The Doctors and the Nurses (1964–65) ===
No. overall	No. in season	Title	Directed by	Written by	Original release date
69	1	"Once Bitten"	Paul Bogart	Ernest Kinoy	September 22, 1964
70	2	"The Suspect: Part 1"	Robert Stevens	Art Wallace	September 29, 1964
71	3	"The Suspect: Part 2"	Robert Stevens	Art Wallace	October 6, 1964
72	4	"Respect of One for Another"	David Greene	Andy Lewis	October 13, 1964
73	5	"No Shadow Where There is No Sun"	Paul Sylbert	Alvin Boretz	October 20, 1964
74	6	"Hildie"	Lamont Johnson	Albert Ruben	October 27, 1964
75	7	"The Outpost"	László Benedek	Alvin Boretz	November 10, 1964
76	8	"The Family Resemblance"	Stuart Rosenberg	Robert Schlitt	November 17, 1964
77	9	"Time for You and Time for Me"	Robert Stevens	Leon Tokatyan	November 24, 1964
78	10	"So Some Girls Play the Cello"	Stuart Rosenberg	Alvin Sargent	December 1, 1964
79	11	"Rites of Spring"	Robert Stevens	Robert Crean	December 8, 1964
80	12	"Next Stop, Valhalla"	László Benedek	Sheldon Stark	December 15, 1964
81	13	"The Skill in These Hands"	Vincent Donehue	Doug Taylor	December 22, 1964
82	14	"A Messenger to Everyone"	Marvin Chomsky	Andy Lewis	December 29, 1964
83	15	"Last Rites of a Rag Doll"	Stuart Rosenberg	Waldo Salt	January 5, 1965
84	16	"The Patient Nurse"	Leonard Horn	Robert Van Scoyk	January 12, 1965
85	17	"A Couple of Dozen Tiny Pills"	David Greene	Edward DeBlasio	January 19, 1965
86	18	"A Question of Murder"	Robert Stevens	Leon Tokatyan	January 26, 1965
87	19	"Night of the Witch"	Paul Bogart	Stanley R. Greenberg	February 2, 1965
88	20	"Sixteen Hours to Chicago"	Paul Bogart	Doug Taylor	February 9, 1965
89	21	"Act of Violence: Part 1"	Daniel Petrie	Albert Ruben	February 16, 1965
Crossover episode with For the People.
90	22	"A Dangerous Silence"	Gerald Meyer	Alvin Boretz	March 2, 1965
91	23	"Where There's Smoke"	Daniel Petrie	Robert Van Scoyk	March 9, 1965
92	24	"The Politicians"	Leonard Horn	Alvin Boretz	March 16, 1965
93	25	"The April Thaw of Dr. Mai"	Paul Bogart	Robert Crean	March 30, 1965
94	26	"Threshold"	Leonard Horn	Edward DeBlasio	April 6, 1965
95	27	"A39846"	Michael Powell	George Bellak	April 20, 1965
96	28	"The Witnesses"	Herschel Daugherty	Irving Gaynor Neiman	April 27, 1965
97	29	"The Heroine"	David Pres	James Yaffe	May 4, 1965
98	30	"An Unweeded Garden"	Marvin Chomsky	Robert Schlitt	May 11, 1965

== ABC TV series ==
The Nurses
- Starring: Mary Fickett; Melinda Cordell; Nicholas Pryor; Paul Stevens; Lesley Woods; Lee Patterson
- Country of origin: United States
- No. of episodes: 395

Production
- Running time: 30 minutes

Original release
- Network: ABC
- Release: September 27, 1965 – March 31, 1967

The Nurses is an American daytime soap opera that aired on ABC from September 27, 1965, to March 31, 1967. The show was a continuation of the CBS primetime drama.

The setting was Alden General Hospital and the main characters included Mary Fickett as Liz Thorpe, RN, and Melinda Cordell as the younger and less experienced Gail Lucas, RN., along with Arthur Franz as Hugh McCloud, Valerie French as Helen Cox, Judson Laire as Jamie McCloud, Lee Patterson as Brad Kirnan, Nicholas Pryor as Ken Alexander, Polly Rowles as Miss Grassberg, Paul Stevens as Dr. Paul Fuller, and Lesley Woods as Vivian Gentry.

=== Production ===
Richard Holland and Gordon Russell were the head writers. The executive producer was Doris Quinlan, who later produced One Life to Live, All My Children, and The Doctors Several of the performers on this show were later on One Life to Live and All My Children. The music for the series was composed by Frank Lewin.
