= Brenner (TV series) =

American TV crime drama (1959–1964)

- Genre: Crime drama
- Created by: Herbert Brodkin
- Written by: Alvin Boretz; George Bellak
- Directed by: Gerald Mayer; Herman Hoffman
- Starring: Edward Binns; James Broderick; Dick O'Neill; Walter Greaza; Sydney Pollack; Crahan Denton; Gene Hackman
- Theme music composer: Frank Lewin
- Composers: Sydney Pollack; Laurence Rosenthal
- Country of origin: United States
- Original language: English
- No. of seasons: 2
- No. of episodes: 25

Production
- Executive producer: Herbert Brodkin
- Producer: Arthur Lewis
- Production locations: New York City, U.S.
- Cinematography: Maurice Hartzband; George Jacobson
- Editors: Sidney Katz; Arline Garson; Earl Booth; Alvin Boretz
- Running time: 30 minutes
- Production company: Plautus Productions

Original release
- Network: CBS
- Release: June 6, 1959 – July 19, 1964

Related
- Playhouse 90; Naked City

Brenner is an American crime drama that began on June 6, 1959, and ended on September 13, 1964.

The series was filmed in New York City focusing on Lieutenant Roy Brenner, a 20-year veteran of the Internal Affairs Department of the NYPD, and his son Ernie, a rookie detective, who travel around the city solving various crimes. The series starred Edward Binns and James Broderick as Lt. Roy Brenner and Det. Ernie Brenner, respectively. Brenner, a perennial summer replacement series, aired new episodes on CBS from June 6, 1959–September 19, 1959 and again from May 17–July 19, 1964. Reruns plus two previously unaired episodes were seen during the summer of 1961, an additional summer of reruns in 1962 and a final set of new and repeat broadcasts from July 26–September 13, 1964.

== Premise ==
The show was centered around the careers of the Brenners, Roy and his son Ernie. Roy (Edward Binns) is a street hardened lieutenant of the Internal Affairs Department of the NYPD. He has been a part of the NYPD for twenty years. His son Ernie (James Broderick) is an idealistic rookie detective also working for the NYPD. Together, the two face, fight and solve crime, as well as face police corruption and all its ugliness, and try to learn from their different views of life, death, and work.

It was somewhat of a challenge for the two to portray a convincing father-and-son duo with Binns only 11 years older than Broderick.

== Synopsis ==
=== Development ===
The series was created by producer Herbert Brodkin, who had already made himself a household name with producing credits on The Philco Television Playhouse, Goodyear Television Playhouse and The Alcoa Hour for NBC, and Studio One and Playhouse 90 for CBS. Brodkin later produced several other well-well-known television series including The Defenders and The Nurses.

Brenner was a transitional project for Brodkin. It was his first independent production, his first series to be shot on film, and (aside from his first producing assignment, CBS's live Charlie Wild, Private Detective) his initial concession to the reality that programs with running characters were quickly supplanting the anthology drama. Like The Defenders and The Nurses, Brenner was based on a one-shot anthology show from Brodkin's catalog, a January 15, 1959 telecast of Playhouse 90 titled "The Blue Men". Edmond O'Brien portrayed Roy Brenner, and Richard LePore played Ernie Brenner. The episode was written by Alvin Boretz. Boretz is not credited as the creator of Brenner, although he did contribute scripts to the series.

=== Season 1 (1959-1961) ===
Brenner premiered on Saturday June 6, 1959 on the CBS Television Network. Ratings were poor from the beginning and after fourteen episodes aired, on September 19, 1959, Brenner was cancelled. Two new episodes produced in 1960 aired in June and September 1961.

=== Season 2 (1964) ===
Sixteen episodes of Brenner aired on CBS between June 6, 1959 and September 11, 1961. Ten addition episodes that were produced between 1959 and 1960 had never aired on television. With reruns airing during the summers of 1961 and 1962, CBS decided that during the summer of 1964, they would air the remaining episodes five years after the initial cancellation and three years after new episodes of the series had last aired. The last of those ten episodes aired on Sunday July 19, 1964 with reruns airing until September 13.

== Cast ==
- Lieutenant Roy Brenner - portrayed by Edward Binns. Lt. Brenner, commonly referred to as just Brenner, is the police lieutenant of the Confidential Squad. Lt. Brenner is a street hardened veteran, as he has been working for the NYPD for twenty years.
- Patrolman Ernie Brenner - portrayed by James Broderick. Ernie Brenner, commonly referred to as Officer Brenner, is an idealistic rookie plainclothesman for the NYPD. He, along with his father Roy, travel around New York City solving crimes.*
- Detective Steve Mason - portrayed by Dick O'Neill
- Inspector Spaud - portrayed by Walter Greaza
- Detective Al Dunn - portrayed by Sydney Pollack
- Detective Tom Cleary - portrayed by Crahan Denton
- Officer Richard Clayburn - portrayed by Gene Hackman°

* In real life, Binns was only 10 years older than his TV son portrayed by Broderick.
° Hackman was not credited for the three appearances as Officer Clayburn.

== Episodes ==
=== Season 1 (1959–61) ===
No. overall	No. in season	Title	Directed by	Written by	Original release date
1	1	"False Witness"	Gerald Meyer	Loring Mandel	June 6, 1959
Officer Ernie Brenner is put under pressure by the District Attorney to change his testimony in a weak case. The young cop's father, Detective Lt. Roy Brenner, has to take action to stop it.
2	2	"Record of Arrest"	Gerald Mayer	Jerome Coopersmith	June 13, 1959
A man is supplying guns to teenagers, and Ernie and another officer named Frank set out to track the criminal down.
3	3	"Family Man"	Unknown	Unknown	June 20, 1959
Detective Brenner is providing police protection for Arnold Joplin, a key witness in a case. Joplin's daughter is also gets much attention, only from Ernie.
4	4	"Blind Spot"	Unknown	Unknown	June 27, 1959
Lt. Brenner forgets all the codes of conduct he demands others to follow when his son Ernie is shot in the line of duty.
5	5	"Loan Shark"	Unknown	Unknown	July 4, 1959
Brenner has begun surveillance on a furniture store suspected of being a front for loan-sharks. A more disturbing fact is that police officers have been seen regularly going in and out of the store.
6	6	"Word of Honor"	Unknown	Unknown	July 11, 1959
Officers Paul Harris and Ernie Brenner round up and arrest a group of young hoodlums when an accidental discharge from Harris' gun kills one of the young men. Since the youth was not armed, a vendetta from the newspapers screams of police brutality.
7	7	"I, Executioner"	Gerald Mayer	Alvin Boretz	July 18, 1959
Ernie has just had to do what all police officers hope they never will; he has killed a man in the line of duty. Now so bothered by the fact that he's taken a life, he doesn't know if he'll be able to use a gun again and fears his career in law enforcement is over.
8	8	"The Bluff"	Unknown	Unknown	July 25, 1959
A woman yells for a police officer's help, only to have him turn and walk away. Detective Brenner now has the job of finding the cop who turned his back on his duty.
9	9	"Small Take"	Herman Hoffman	Henry Kane	August 1, 1959
Detective Brenner is investigating one case, while son Ernie, a patrol officer, is sent to another case, yet they both end up with the same criminals: counterfeiters.
10	10	"One of Our Own"	Unknown	Unknown	August 8, 1959
11	11	"Man in the Middle"	Unknown	Unknown	August 15, 1959
Lt. Brenner runs across an old flame, as he delves into the arrest of a group of young men for trivial offenses, who appear to be covering up their real criminal activities.
12	12	"Thin Ice"	Herman Hoffman	Story by : Sheldon Stark; Teleplay by : Sheldon Stark & George Bellak	August 22, 1959
Brenner sets out to investigate a rash of calls concerning school children who, instead of eating, are spending their lunch money playing on a pinball machine in a nearby candy store.
13	13	"Crime Wave"	Unknown	Unknown	August 29, 1959
A wave of criminal activity is seemingly running rampant in a certain part of town. Detective Lt. Roy Brenner leads a task force to see why that is, and why the local precinct is not able to stop it.
14	14	"Monopoly On Fear"	Gerald Mayer	Jerome Coopersmith	September 19, 1959
Police officer Morgan is about to retire to sunny Florida, complete with a government pension. Feeling kind hearted, he lets a crook go, but the crook is not feeling so generous.
15	15	"The Thin Line"	Unknown	Unknown	June 16, 1961
Detective Lt. Roy Brenner comes up with a scheme to bust a numbers outfit, and his son, Officer Ernie Brenner, goes undercover to infiltrate the gambling ring.
16	16	"Good Friend"	Gerald Mayer	George Bellak	September 11, 1961
A man who attempts a fur heist looks a lot like Robbie Matthews, one of Ernie's best friends since childhood. Ernie can't believe his buddy would do something like that, but learns Robbie may be in trouble with loan sharks.

=== Season 2 (1964) ===
No. overall	No. in season	Title	Directed by	Written by	Original release date
17	1	"The Long Reach"	Unknown	Unknown	May 17, 1964
18	2	"Laney's Boy"	James Sheldon	Peter Stone	May 24, 1964
Police Captain Laney's son Ben has had run-ins with the law before. Brenner discovers a long-held secret: that the officers in Captain Laney's precinct have kept his son's escapades under wraps, and this has led to Ben planning a serious offense.
19	3	"The Vigilantes"	Jack Gage	Alvin Boretz	May 31, 1964
After a crime spree, the citizens of a small neighborhood decide to take matters into their own hands even though Brenner has the precinct working around the clock to catch the criminals.
20	4	"Departmental Trial"	Gerald Mayer	Alvin Boretz	June 7, 1964
21	5	"Point of Law"	Herman Hoffman	Douglas Taylor	June 14, 1964
Away from his job, Brenner tries to help out underprivileged youths by coaching a basketball team. Only one of his best players is now wanted for being involved in a brutal armed robbery.
22	6	TBA	Unknown	Unknown	June 21, 1964
23	7	"Unwritten Law"	Jack Gage	George Bellak	July 5, 1964
Brenner is assigned to find the missing chauffeur of a murdered mobster, which leads right to the door of a decorated police officer, the son of the murdered man.
24	8	"The Plain Truth"	James Sheldon	Story by : Abram Ginnes; Teleplay by : Abram Ginnes & Sheldon Stark	July 12, 1964
Brenner looks into the case of a veteran cop who was convicted of a hit-and-run, even though he swore he didn't do it. As evidence begins to support his story, the trail leads back home, apparently to his wife's lover as the driver.
25	9	"Crisis"	Gerald Mayer	Steven Gethers	July 19, 1964
Detective Lt. Brenner is in love with Laura Hagen and wants to make her his bride. However, she is hesitant about marrying a police officer.
26	10	"Charlie Paradise: The Tragic Flute"	Gerald Mayer	Story by : Peter Stone & James Yaffee; Teleplay by : Peter Stone	N/A
Brenner enlists the help of an old friend, Charlie Paradise, who is known as the Mayor of Greenwich Village, after an old blind woman and an artist are murdered in that area of New York.

== Broadcast history ==
NOTE: The most frequent time slot for the series is in bold text.

- Saturday at 9-9:30 pm Eastern Time on CBS: **June 6, 1959- October 10, 1959**
- Monday at 10:30-11 pm E. T. on CBS: June 19, 1961 - September 1961 Reruns of original episodes sponsored by Procter & Gamble
- Thursday at 9-9:30 pm E. T. on CBS: June - September 1962
- Sunday at 9:30-10 pm E. T. on CBS: May - September 1964
