= Murrow (film) =

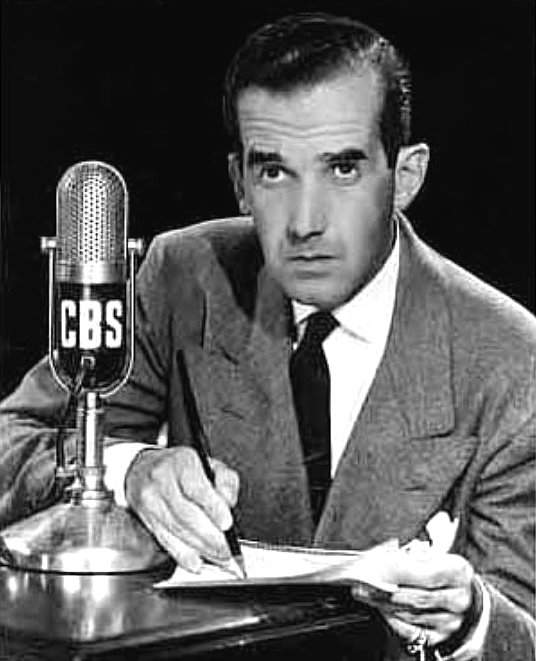
- Genre: Biography, drama
- Written by: Ernest Kinoy
- Directed by: Jack Gold
- Starring: Daniel J. Travanti; Stephen Churchett; Robert Vaughn
- Music by: Carl Davis
- Country of origin: United Kingdom; United States
- Original language: English

Production
- Executive producer: Herbert Brodkin
- Producers: Dickie Bamber; Robert Berger
- Production locations: New York City, London
- Cinematography: Brian West
- Editor: Keith Palmer
- Running time: 114 minutes
- Production companies: HBO Premiere Films; TAFT Entertainment Pictures; TVS Films

Original release
- Network: HBO
- Release: January 19, 1986

Murrow is a 1986 biographical drama television film directed by Jack Gold, written by Ernest Kinoy, and originally broadcast by HBO. Daniel J. Travanti played the title role of American broadcast journalist Edward R. Murrow, and Robert Vaughn co-starred in the supporting role of Franklin D. Roosevelt. The cast also featured Dabney Coleman as CBS President William Paley.

== Plot ==
The movie begins during the early days of World War II when Murrow was a combat correspondent in London broadcasting to the United States. Murrow courageously reports from the front lines and even goes on bombing missions. During a White House visit after Pearl Harbor, President Roosevelt tells Murrow he is the most influential American in England.

After the war, Murrow continues his radio career and eventually expands into television with his popular See It Now show. He eventually makes his most famous broadcast attacking Wisconsin Senator Joseph McCarthy and his brutal tactics. He is credited with helping topple McCarthy. Throughout all of this, Murrow is a man of unimpeachable honor and integrity. This brings him into conflict with his network superiors who care more about profits and ratings.

Murrow eventually leaves television and becomes the Director of the United States Information Agency. A heavy chain-smoker, he contracts lung cancer and dies at the age of 57.

== Cast ==
- Daniel J. Travanti as Edward R. Murrow
- Dabney Coleman as CBS Chairman William S. Paley
- John McMartin as CBS President Frank Stanton
- Edward Herrmann as Fred Friendly
- Stephen Churchett as BBC Technician
- Robert Vaughn as President Franklin D. Roosevelt
- Kathryn Leigh Scott as Janet Murrow
- Martyn Stanbridge as Lancaster Captain
- Philip Voss as Censor
- Lorelei King as Waitress

== Reception ==
The Los Angeles Times described it as "provocative", and Time described a "storm of protest" concerning its portrayal of CBS executives.
