= Skokie (film) =

1981 American drama TV film

- Genre: Drama
- Written by: Ernest Kinoy
- Directed by: Herbert Wise
- Starring: Brian Dennehy; Eli Wallach; Danny Kaye
- Theme music composer: Ralph Berliner
- Country of origin: United States
- Original language: English

Production
- Executive producers: Bernard Sofronski; Herbert Brodkin
- Producer: Robert Berger
- Cinematography: Alex Thomson
- Editor: Stephen A. Rotter
- Running time: 125 minutes
- Production company: Titus Productions

Original release
- Network: CBS
- Release: November 17, 1981

Skokie is a 1981 television film directed by Herbert Wise, based on a real life controversy in Skokie, Illinois, involving the National Socialist Party of America. This controversy would be fought in court and reach the level of the United States Supreme Court in National Socialist Party of America v. Village of Skokie.

The film premiered in the US on November 17, 1981. It was shown on the Israeli Educational television in the 1980s and on German television on March 3, 1997.

== Plot summary ==
The peace of Skokie, a comfortable suburban village located just north of Chicago, is threatened when Frank Collin, a politically astute neo-Nazi organizer, selects the place as the site of his next rally. Close to 40 percent of the village's population is Jewish, and many of them are survivors of the Holocaust. They see the march as a warning and reminder of their days as concentration camp prisoners.

The Jewish community decides to stand against the rally at all costs to make sure that the Holocaust will never be forgotten or allowed to happen again.

Moderate leaders Bert Silverman and Abbot Rosen advise the Jewish community to ignore the neo-Nazis; the strategy they put forward is "quarantine", isolating the meeting by totally ignoring the neo-Nazi presence and refusing to be provoked. They see their logic as simple: if the Jewish community refuses to acknowledge the rally and thus refuses to feed the media any publicity, the meeting will be futile and eventually forgotten.

However, one citizen challenges their argument. A Holocaust survivor, Max Feldman, says that he was told to ignore the Nazis nearly 40 years ago in Germany, and before he knew it he was in a concentration camp. He says this time he will take action, and he is ready to shed blood if necessary. Led by this de facto spokesman, most members of the community agree to protest.

== Cast ==
- Danny Kaye as Max Feldman
- John Rubinstein as Herb Lewisohn
- Kim Hunter as Bertha Feldman
- Eli Wallach as Bert Silverman
- Carl Reiner as Abbot Rosen
- Marin Kanter as Janet Feldman
- George Dzundza as Frank Collin
- Brian Dennehy as Police Chief Arthur Buchanan
- Ed Flanders as Mayor Albert G. Smith
- Charles Levin as Rabbi Steinburg
- Lee Strasberg as Morton Weisman
- Robin Bartlett as JDL Girl

== Historicity ==
The film intermixes real and fictional characters and events, including fictionalizing aspects of some of the main characters. For example, American Civil Liberties Union (ACLU) lawyer "Herb Lewisohn" (played by actor John Rubinstein) is fictional, apparently based on attorney (and later law professor) David A. Goldberger who argued the case in real life, while ACLU national lawyer Aryeh Neier (played by actor Stephen D. Newman) is a real person. Similarly, Holocaust survivor "Max Feldman" is fictional, while Holocaust survivor Sol Goldstein (played by actor David Hurst) is a real person.
