= Coronet Blue =

American television series

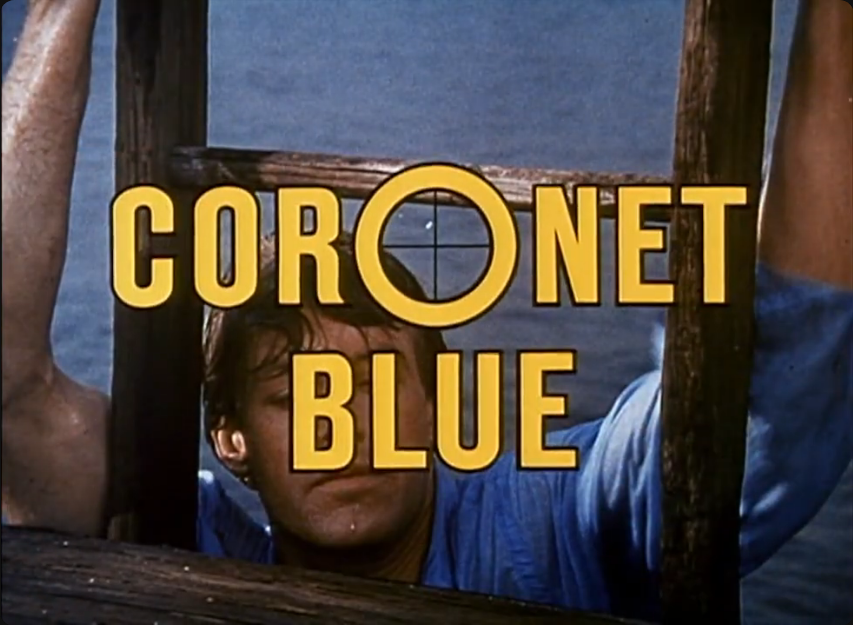
- Title card with Frank Converse as Michael Alden
- Created by: Larry Cohen
- Starring: Frank Converse; Brian Bedford
- Opening theme: "Coronet Blue" performed by Lenny Welch
- Composer: Laurence Rosenthal
- Country of origin: United States
- Original language: English
- No. of seasons: 1
- No. of episodes: 13 (2 unaired)

Production
- Executive producer: Herbert Brodkin
- Running time: 60 minutes
- Production company: Plautus Productions

Original release
- Network: CBS
- Release: May 29 – September 4, 1967

Coronet Blue is an American adventure drama series that ran on CBS from May 29 until September 4, 1967.

It starred Frank Converse as Michael Alden, an amnesiac in search of his identity. Brian Bedford co-starred. The show's 13 episodes were filmed in 1965 and were originally intended to be shown during the 1965–66 television season, but CBS put the show on hiatus when they reversed an earlier decision to cancel the drama Slattery's People. The network had plans to show Coronet Blue the following year, and CBS head of programming Michael Dann said, "there still is enormous enthusiasm" for it, but it would take another full year before the network aired it as a summer replacement.

It proved moderately popular and developed a cult following. According to Converse, CBS wanted to renew it but by then Converse had signed to do another series for ABC, N.Y.P.D., which premiered the day after the last airing of Coronet Blue.

Due to a number of pre-emptions, only 11 of the 13 episodes were shown during the initial run. The theme song was performed by rhythm and blues singer Lenny Welch.

== Plot details ==
In an introductory sequence in the first episode, Frank Converse's character is aboard a passenger ship docked in New York, and is briefly addressed as "Gigot". Lured to a secluded spot on deck, he is told by a woman and two men that they know his intentions and that he has—somehow—betrayed them. They drug him, strip him of all identification, and dump him in the river.

Later, he manages to pull himself ashore, and the only words he says are "Coronet Blue". He can't remember his name, and there are no clues to his identity, as there is no record of anyone with his fingerprints.

Suffering from amnesia, possibly due to the effects of the drug, the mysterious near-drowning victim adopts the name "Michael Alden," a combination of the name of his doctor and the name of the hospital where he was taken to recover. After checking out of the hospital against medical advice, Alden tries to unravel the mystery using the only clue he has—by checking out any business or enterprise that is named "Blue Coronet", "Blue Crown", or any other similar name he can think of. He discovers that there is a more pressing issue: he has been targeted for assassination by the same mysterious group that dumped him in the river. Over the remaining episodes, "Michael Alden" attempts to discover his identity and the identities of his assailants, who are referred to in one episode as "Greybeards." During this, he discovers that he speaks fluent Spanish and French, but he has no idea how or why he learned these languages. He also discovers that he can play the piano and has some martial arts skill.

During his travels Alden befriends Max Spier (Joe Silver), owner of The Seeing I, a restaurant where Alden sometimes works as a dishwasher. Alden also befriends a monk, Brother Anthony (Brian Bedford). Both are recurring characters; they are not seen in every episode. The Greybeards are even more rarely glimpsed, but the credits identify two recurring Greybeards (seen only fairly fleetingly in two episodes) as Vincent (Robert Burr) and Margaret (Bernice Massi).

The series ended before the solution to the mystery of Michael Alden's identity was revealed, but series creator Larry Cohen later told his biographer:

...Converse was not really an American at all. He was a Russian who had been trained to appear like an American and was sent to the U.S. as a spy. He belonged to a spy unit called "Coronet Blue." He decided to defect, so the Russians tried to kill him before he could give away the identities of the other Soviet agents. And nobody could really identify him because he didn't exist as an American. Coronet Blue was actually an outgrowth of 'The Traitor' episode of The Defenders.

== Episodes ==
No.	Title	Directed by	Written by	Original release date	Prod. code
1	"A Time to Be Born"	Paul Bogart	Albert Ruben	May 29, 1967	001
A man called "Gigot" by an assailant is pulled from a river, but has no memory of his past except two words--"Coronet Blue". He is rehabilitated and gives himself the name "Michael Alden" and begins his trek to "find his past" but soon realizes he is targeted for assassination. Guest stars: Susan Hampshire, Chester Morris, Jane Holzer and Jon Cypher.
2	"The Assassins"	Lamont Johnson	Albert Ruben	June 12, 1967	006
Alden is reunited with people who claim to be his parents and fiance. But when certain things do not add up, he begins to wonder if they "really are" who they say they are. Guest stars: Janet Margolin, Signe Hasso and Edward Binns.
3	"The Rebels"	Sam Wanamaker	Robert Van Scoyk	June 19, 1967	011
At a college in New York, Alden is the focus of experiments to overcome amnesia, but he must share a dorm room with students and earn his keep by working shifts at campus security, but this puts him in conflict with protesting students. Guest stars: Richard Kiley, David Carradine, Jon Voight, Candice Bergen, Ray Middleton and Addison Powell.
4	"A Dozen Demons"	David Greene	Robert J. Crean	July 3, 1967	003
Brother Anthony (Brian Bedford) is a young monk who may hold a clue to Michael Alden's real identity after he sees Alden's likeness in a painting. (NOTE: This episode is edited on the DVD release to remove a copyrighted poem recited near the end of the episode.) Guest stars: John Beal, Lynda Day George, Donald Moffat and House Jameson.
5	"Faces"	Robert Stevens	Alvin Sargent	July 10, 1967	004
A mysterious photograph of a funeral reception for a murdered girl shows Alden present. Though a young man was convicted, and Alden has no memory of the event, he suspects he might be the actual killer. Guest stars: Mitchell Ryan, Hal Holbrook, Marisa Berenson, Joanna Roos and Phyllis Thaxter.
6	"Man Running"	Sam Wanamaker	Art Wallace	July 17, 1967	008
Alden unwittingly gets caught up in a plot to kill a political figure and his daughter. Guest stars: Denholm Elliott, René Enríquez and Juliet Mills.
7	"A Charade for Murder"	David Pressman	Andy Lewis	July 24, 1967	009
Anthony is lured to a strange apartment by a naval officer, where he finds a girl in a harem costume. Police later accuse him of murder, when the officer's body is found in the same room where his fingerprints are also found. Guest stars: Jack Cassidy, Brenda Vaccaro, Roy Scheider, Richard Bright and Paul Sparer.
8	"Saturday"	David Greene	Alvin Sargent	July 31, 1967	012
Alden makes arrangements to pay a man $2000 for his true identity, but both are pursued by ruthless hit men. A troubled boy joins him hiding out in Central Park, unable to face home responsibilities after his father dies. Guest stars: Neva Patterson, Miles Chapin, Charles Randall and David Hartman.
9	"The Presence of Evil"	Sam Wanamaker	Robert Crean	August 7, 1967	013
A reluctant girl is used as a medium in a magic act, and a blue coronet is part of her costume. This intrigues Alden and Anthony, who are then unexpectedly drawn into a strange plot. Guest stars: Viveca Lindfors, Leonard Elliott, Judi West, and Joseph Wiseman.
10	"Six Months to Mars"	David Greene	Stanley R. Greenberg	August 14, 1967	005
Feds want to exploit Alden's amnesia for simulating a mission to Mars. Brainwashed, he and a partner are placed into a drug-induced simulator. His partner's breakdown aborts the mission, just as Michael begins to remember parts of his past. Guest stars: Alan Alda, Patrick O'Neal, Billy Dee Williams and Dennis Patrick.
11	"The Flip Side of Timmy Devon"	David Greene	Albert Ruben; Sherman Yellen	September 4, 1967	010
Alden hears a pop tune on the radio, supposedly from a dead singer, yet never released until that moment-but he somehow knows the lyrics already, and surmises that he had to have been present at the recording session. Guest stars: Peter Duchin, Sally Kellerman, Dick Clark, Murray the K, Bruce Scott, Pamela Toll and Jesse Colin Young.
12	"Where You From and What You Done?"	Sam Wanamaker	Edward DeBlasio	UNAIRED	002
In North Carolina, Alden is befriended by a cheery, ditzy blonde aspiring folk singer. Her imaginative fabrications gradually become strange and sinister, and he's forced to find out who she is. Guest stars: Laura Devon, Vincent Gardenia, Haila Stoddard and Martha Greenhouse.
13	"Tomoyo"	David Greene	Waldo Salt	UNAIRED	007
Michael spies an Asian girl whom he believes he met with in his forgotten past. Following her leads to brutes, discovering he knows karate, a dojo instructor who mentors him, confused and cleared memories, with a martial arts finish. Guest stars: Sab Shimono, Daniel J. Travanti, Cely Carillo and Keye Luke.

== Home media ==
Kino Lorber released all 13 episodes on DVD on July 18, 2017.
