= Plautus (disambiguation) =

Plautus (Titus Maccius Plautus; c. 254–184 BC) was a Roman comic playwright.

Plautus may also refer to:

- Rubellius Plautus (33–62 AD), a Roman noble and a political rival of Emperor Nero
- Plautus Productions, 1960s American television production company
- Plautus, an obsolete genus comprising auk species:
  - Great auk (Plautus impennis, now Pinguinus impennis)
  - Little auk (Plautus alle, now Alle alle)
