= Lusitania (disambiguation) =

Lusitania was an ancient Roman province corresponding to most of modern Portugal. It also refers to an infamous disaster in 1915 involving the RMS Lusitania

Lusitania, Lusitan, Lusitanian, and Lusitanic may also refer to:

== Cultures and peoples ==
- Lusitanians, the original Indo-European inhabitants of Lusitania (Proto-Celt)
- Lusitanian language, an extinct Indo-European Paleohispanic language
- Lusitanian mythology, the mythology of the Lusitanians
- Judaeo-Portuguese, an extinct Jewish language

== Places ==
- Kingdom of Northern Lusitania, proposed by Napoleon for the king of Etruria in Northwestern Portugal
- New Lusitania, a Portuguese colony in Brazil

== Science ==
- Lusitania (alga), a genus of green algae
- Lusitanian distribution, a disjunct distribution of a species
- HD 45652, a star named Lusitania

== Sport ==
- S.C. Lusitânia (basketball), an Azorean basketball team
- Lusitânia F.C., Portuguese football club

== Other uses ==
- List of ships named Lusitania
- Lusitania (album), by Fairweather, 2003
- Lusitania, a size of cigar of the Partagás brand
- Lusitania, the name of a British Rail Class 40 locomotive

== See also ==
- Lusitano (disambiguation)
- Lusatia, a historical region in Central Europe
- Lusitanian War, between the Lusitanians and Ancient Rome
