= For the People (1965 TV series) =

American TV crime drama series (1965)

- Genre: Legal drama
- Created by: Stuart Rosenberg
- Country of origin: United States
- Original language: English
- No. of seasons: 1
- No. of episodes: 13

Production
- Producer: Arthur Joel Katz
- Camera setup: Andy Lazlo
- Running time: 60 minutes
- Production companies: Plautus Productions; Titus Productions

Original release
- Network: CBS
- Release: January 31 – May 9, 1965

For the People is an American legal drama that aired on CBS from January 31 until May 9, 1965. The series starred William Shatner as a New York City prosecutor. It was shot on location in New York.

== Premise ==
In his first continuing starring role on TV, William Shatner played assistant district attorney David Koster in New York City.

Koster encountered conflicts with criminals and with his superiors as he sought justice with "obsessive dedication". His immediate supervisor, bureau chief Anthony Celese, admired Koster's passion but tried to keep him under close control. Detective Frank Malloy worked with Koster to bring criminals to justice. Besides his conflicts at work, Koster sometimes encountered conflicts with his wife, Phyllis. As a classical viola player, she had her own priorities in life.

The series went beyond legal matters and dealt with personal problems among the characters.

== Cast ==
- William Shatner as David Koster, an assistant district attorney
- Howard Da Silva as Anthony Celese, a district attorney and Koster's boss
- Lonny Chapman as Frank Malloy, a police detective
- Jessica Walter as Phyllis Koster, David's wife

== Episodes ==
No.	Title	Directed by	Written by	Original release date
1	"To Prosecute All Crimes"	David Greene	Ernest Kinoy and Albert Sanders	January 31, 1965
"Koster becomes obsessed with the idea of indicting a big-time racketeer, despite stiff opposition from his bureau chief."
2	"Guilt Shall Not Escape or Innocence Suffer"	Stuart Rosenberg	Ernest Kinoy	February 14, 1965
A vagrant is arrested for burglary and assault, he admits to the assault but denies the theft.
3	"The Influence of Fear"	Stuart Rosenberg	Art Wallace	February 21, 1965
The public wants the death sentence for a Puerto Rican boy who is charged with the murder of an elderly woman.
4	"Act of Violence: Part 2"	Daniel Petrie	Albert Ruben	February 28, 1965
A man kills his teacher after an argument. (Crossover episode with The Doctors and the Nurses.)
5	"Between Candor and Shame"	Tom Gries	Leon Tokatyan	March 7, 1965
Koster deals with the conflict between freedom of expression and shielding people from obscenity.
6	"The Killing of One Human Being"	Stuart Rosenberg	Ernest Kinoy	March 14, 1965
Koster and Cahane disagree about the future of a woman who is charged with first-degree murder.
7	"Dangerous to the Public Peace and Safety"	Stuart Rosenberg	Robert Thom	March 21, 1965
An emotionally disturbed teenager is a suspect in the killing of six girls.
8	"Secure Any Special Privileger or Advantage"	Herbert Hirschman	Al Sargent	March 28, 1965
An actor is arrested for impersonating an officer.
9	"The Right to Kill"	Unknown	Unknown	April 4, 1965
A prison guard is suspected of murder, but he claims it was in self defence.
10	"With Intent to influence"	Unknown	Unknown	April 11, 1965
A high official hides evidence about an old political scandal.
11	"Seized, Confined and Detained"	Paul Almond	Art Wallace	April 25, 1965
A diabetic boy is kidnapped.
12	"Any Benevolent Purpose"	Howard Da Silva	Harold Gast	May 2, 1965
A con man accuses the executive director of a charity of taking bribes.
13	"A Competent Witness"	Unknown	Harold Gast	May 9, 1965
An ex-convict has identified a cop killer, but Koster doesn't think he will be trusted in court.

== Production ==
For the People was broadcast on Sundays from 9 to 10 p.m. Eastern Time. It was "rushed on the air Jan. 31 as part of the network's sweeping realignment of programming" after having been scheduled to debut the following fall. The series was canceled after its first season. The cancellation left Shatner free to accept the role of Captain James T. Kirk on Star Trek.

Herbert Brodkin was the executive producer, and Joel Katz was the producer. Directors included Tom Gries, Daniel Petrie, Stuart Rosenberg, Robert Stevens, and Sam Wanamaker. Writers included David Davidson, Harold Gast, Ernest Kinoy, Andy Lewis, Albert Ruben, Albert Sanders, Alvin Sargent, Leon Tokatyan, and Art Wallace.

The series was the first to use the "active camera" concept, in which the camera went beyond recording to participate in the action, providing "the effect of immediacy".

== Cancellation ==
Brodkin and CBS programming executive Mike Dann had contrasting views about the series's cancellation after 13 weeks. Brodkin said that CBS initially asked him to prepare the show in six weeks to be shown either on Friday nights (replacing The Reporter) or on Saturday nights (replacing Mr. Broadway). "To our horror," Brodkin said, "we discovered that our time period was opposite Bonanza." He added that in that time slot "we didn't have a chance".

Dann refused to blame the time slot, noting that The Ed Sullivan Show was the lead-in, with Candid Camera following For the People. "People who usually stay right through that sequence of programming went to the trouble to switch it off," he said.
