= Pueblo (film) =

- Genre: Drama; War
- Written by: Stanley R. Greenberg
- Directed by: Anthony Page
- Starring: Hal Holbrook; Ronny Cox; Andrew Duggan
- Music by: Laurence Rosenthal
- Country of origin: United States
- Original language: English

Production
- Producer: Herbert Brodkin
- Cinematography: Roz Bigelow; Everett Melosh
- Editor: Alfred Muller
- Running time: 100 minutes
- Production company: Titus Productions

Original release
- Network: ABC
- Release: March 29, 1973

Pueblo is a 1973 American made-for-television war drama film starring Hal Holbrook, Ronny Cox and Andrew Duggan. It originally aired on ABC on March 29, 1973 as part of the network's ABC Theater series. Essentially a videotaped stage production, Pueblo was the story of the capture and imprisonment of the crew of USS Pueblo, a US Navy vessel captured while spying off the coast of North Korea, in 1968.

The production starred Hal Holbrook as Captain Lloyd Bucher, commanding officer of Pueblo. The structure of the play consists of Captain Bucher answering questions of two tribunals, with the scene switching back and forth between his interrogations by the North Koreans and the inquiry by the US Navy (after his return) into his possible misconduct in the Pueblo Incident. As Bucher describes incidents during the capture of the ship and during the crew's subsequent captivity, the viewer is shown re-enactments of the same.

At the 26th Primetime Emmy Awards, the program and its performers were nominated for seven awards and at the ceremony on May 28, 1974, won five. Holbrook won two Emmy Awards for his performance in Pueblo, one as Best Lead Actor in a Drama and another for Actor of the Year. Director Anthony Page was nominated for Best Director in Drama a Single Program but did not win. The program won technical awards for Film Sound Editing, Film or Tape Sound Mixing, Video Tape Editing, and was nominated for Technical Direction and Electronic Camerawork. Pueblo received critical praise, with the New York Times stating, "Pueblo succeeds powerfully as television".
