= Jonathan Segal =

Jonathan Segal may refer to:

- Jonathan Segal (director), film director and producer
- Jonathan Segal (actor), American television actor

== See also ==
- Jonathan Segel, American composer and multi-instrumentalist
