= Plautus Productions =

American production company (1959–1967)

- Type: Television subsidiary
- Industry: Motion pictures, television programs
- Founded: 1959
- Founder: Herbert Brodkin
- Defunct: 1967
- Headquarters: Los Angeles, California,
- Parent: Paramount Pictures (1963-1967)

Plautus Productions was an American television and film production company during the 1960s. The company was founded by producer and director Herbert Brodkin.

Plautus Productions was best known as the production company for some of CBS's popular crime dramas including Brenner, The Defenders, The Nurses (also known as The Doctors and the Nurses), and Coronet Blue, along with NBC's Espionage, the only Plautus production produced for a network other than CBS.

Plautus Productions was a television subsidiary of Paramount Pictures, who acquired it in 1963.

== History ==
Plautus Productions was formed in 1959 by producer Herbert Brodkin and Paramount Pictures. The main sole purpose of the company at time of its founding was to provide production and distribution services to Brodkin's new series Brenner which premiered on CBS that same year.

After finding success with Brenner, Brodkin, who served as the president of the company, used that company to produce some of his other television series.

The company closed in 1967, two years after Brodkin, along with fellow producer and business associate Robert "Buzz" Berger founded Titus Productions which took most of Brodkin's attention away from Plautus and made its first show, Shane, at Paramount Pictures.

== Ownership and distribution of television properties ==
Brenner, The Defenders, The Nurses, For the People and Coronet Blue all ran on CBS and are presently owned and distributed by CBS Media Ventures.

Espionage, which ran for one season on NBC, was co-produced by ATV, an ITV contractor in the United Kingdom. Though distributed by the now defunct ITC Entertainment outside of the United Kingdom, the program's distribution rights are now with Metro-Goldwyn-Mayer, which also owns the program.

== Productions by Plautus ==
Film
Year	Film	Notes
1961	The Young Lovers	
1961	Killer Instinct	TV movie
1962	The Broken Barrelhead	
1962	Night Shift	
1962	The Naked Heiress	
1962	The Image of Angela	
1962	The Last Six Months	
1962	The Voices of the Death	
1962	The Locked Room	
1963	Judgment Eve	
1967	A Time to Be Born, A Time to Die	
Television
Year	Title	Notes
1959-1964	Brenner	Produced for CBS
1961-1965	The Defenders	Produced for CBS
1962-1965	The Nurses	Produced for CBS; Also known as The Doctors and the Nurses
1964-1965	Espionage	Produced for NBC (United States) and ATV (United Kingdom)
1965	For the People	Produced for CBS
1967	Coronet Blue	Produced for CBS
