= Crawlspace (1972 film) =

- Genre: Horror; Thriller
- Based on: Crawlspace by Herbert Lieberman
- Teleplay by: Ernest Kinoy
- Directed by: John Newland; Buzz Kulik
- Starring: Tom Happer; Arthur Kennedy; Teresa Wright
- Theme music composer: Jerry Goldsmith
- Country of origin: United States
- Original language: English

Production
- Executive producer: Herbert Brodkin
- Producer: Robert Berger
- Production location: Norwich, Connecticut
- Cinematography: Urs Furrer
- Editors: Carl Lerner; Len Saltzberg
- Running time: 74 minutes
- Production company: Titus Productions

Original release
- Network: CBS
- Release: February 11, 1972

Crawlspace is a 1972 American made-for-television horror film and thriller directed by John Newland and Buzz Kulik, produced by Herbert Brodkin and Robert Berger, and written by Ernest Kinoy. The movie starred Arthur Kennedy, Teresa Wright, and Tom Happer. The movie aired on February 11, 1972.

== Origins ==
The film is based on the novel Crawlspace, written by Herbert Lieberman. The plot of the novel revolves around the relationship between an elderly couple, Albert and Alice Graves, and a young heating oil delivery man named Richard. When Richard comes by to refill their furnace, Alice invites the young man to stay for dinner. This innocent invitation proves to be a fateful decision for the Graves. The novel was published on January 1, 1971.

== Plot ==
Elderly couple Albert Graves, (Arthur Kennedy) and his wife Alice (Teresa Wright) have just moved from the city to a small country town to help Albert recuperate from a heart attack.

After they discover a problem with the furnace in their basement, they call for a repairman to come out and service it. The repair company sends a boy named Richard Atlee (Tom Happer) to the house. The couple takes an interest in Richard, so they invite him to stay for dinner.

A few days later, Albert awakens to hear noise coming from under the house. To Albert's shock and bewilderment, he finds that the boy, Richard, has taken residence in the crawlspace of the house. Albert and Alice have longed for a child of their own for years, so they decide to take Richard in and more or less raise him. But Richard refuses to sleep in the main part of the house, and insists on staying in the crawlspace. Even after being warned about Richard's instability by the sheriff, Sheriff Birge (Eugene Roche), the couple continue to develop a close bond with the boy.

Sheriff Birge's suspicions are confirmed when Richard begins acting out violently toward the Graves and the town. Richard even resorts to crime. During one of his violent outbursts, he smashes up a section of the town's general store.

The film resolves in violence and tragedy.

== Cast ==
- Tom Happer as Richard Roy Atlee
- Arthur Kennedy as Albert Graves
- Teresa Wright as Alice Graves
- Eugene Roche as Sheriff Emil Birge
- Matthew Cowles as Dave Freeman
- Dan Morgan as Dr. Harlow
- Roger Serbagi as Davalos
- Louise Campbell as Miz Gerard
- Fleet Emerson as Wheeler

== DVD release ==
Crawlspace was released on DVD on October 1, 2007, by Wild Eye Releasing.
