= Herbert Lieberman =

American novelist

- Born: Herbert Henry Lieberman; September 22, 1933
- Died: May 30, 2023 (aged 89); New Rochelle, New York, U.S.
- Education: City College of New York (AB); Columbia University (AM)
- Occupations: Novelist; playwright
- Spouse: Judith Barsky
- Children: 1
- Parent: Abraham Lieberman (father)

Herbert Henry Lieberman (September 22, 1933 – May 30, 2023) was an American mystery/crime novelist and playwright.

Liberman's mother was an orphan who fled Romania and came over to America on the Lusitania. She married Abraham Lieberman, of New Rochelle, New York.

He received his AB from City College of New York and his AM from Columbia University. In 1977 he won the Grand Prix de Littérature Policière's International Prize for City of the Dead. He is a former managing editor of the Reader's Digest Book Club.

== Personal life ==
Lieberman married Judith Barsky, and they have one daughter, and twin granddaughters.

Lierberman, as a teenager, used to work at a soda pop shop. When he grew up, he worked at the New York Reader's Digest Book Club. In his later years, he lived in California with his wife, and his wire-haired dachshund, Henry.

His horror novels were based upon nightmares which he had. Lieberman died on May 30, 2023, at the age of 89.

== Novels ==
- The Adventures of Dolphin Green (1967)
- Crawlspace (1971)
- The Eighth Square (1973)
- Brilliant Kids (1975)
- City of the Dead (1976)
- The Climate of Hell (1978)
- Night Call from a Distant Time Zone (1982)
- Nightbloom (1984)
- The Green Train (1986)
- Shadow Dancers (1989)
- Sandman, Sleep (1993)
- The Girl with the Botticelli Eyes (1996)
- The Concierge (1998)
- The Vagabond of Holmby Park (2003)

== Plays produced and cinematography ==
- Matty, the Moron, and Madonna, directed by Jose Quintero at The Orpheum Theatre (Manhattan), won the University of Chicago Charles E. Sergel Drama Award.
- Tigers in Red Weather, produced by the Minnesota Theatre Company
- Crawlspace was a TV movie, adapted from Lieberman's novel. It was directed by John Newland and Buzz Kulik, and it starred Arthur Kennedy, Teresa Wright, and Tom Happer.
