= Tom Fitzsimmons =

Tom Fitzsimmons may refer to:

- Tom Fitzsimmons (baseball)
- Tom Fitzsimmons (actor)
