= Stephen A. Rotter =

American film editor

- Other names: Steven Rotter; Stephen Rotter; Steven A. Rotter
- Occupation: Film editor
- Years active: 1969–present

Stephen A. Rotter is a film editor who won at the 56th Academy Awards in the category of Best Film Editing. He was one of the five film editors to win for the film The Right Stuff. He shared it with Glenn Farr, Lisa Fruchtman, Tom Rolf and Douglas Stewart.

He has worked on over 30 films as an editor.

In addition, Rotter has also won an Emmy for the mini-series Holocaust. Which he shared with Alan Heim, Craig McKay, Robert M. Reitano and Brian Smedley-Aston.

== Selected filmography ==
Editor
Year	Film	Director	Notes
1973	The Seven-Ups	Philip D'Antoni	
1975	Night Moves	Arthur Penn	Fourth collaboration with Arthur Penn
1976	The Missouri Breaks	Arthur Penn	Fifth collaboration with Arthur Penn
1982	The World According to Garp	George Roy Hill	Second collaboration with George Roy Hill
1983	The Right Stuff	Philip Kaufman	First collaboration with Philip Kaufman
1985	Heaven Help Us	Michael Dinner	
1985	Target	Arthur Penn	Sixth collaboration with Arthur Penn
1987	Ishtar	Elaine May	
1988	Dirty Rotten Scoundrels	Frank Oz	
1989	An Innocent Man	Peter Yates	
1990	My Blue Heaven	Herbert Ross	First collaboration with Herbert Ross
1991	True Colors	Herbert Ross	Second collaboration with Herbert Ross
1992	Prelude to a Kiss	Norman René	
1993	Rising Sun	Philip Kaufman	Second collaboration with Philip Kaufman
1994	Cops & Robbersons	Michael Ritchie	
1995	Father of the Bride Part II	Charles Shyer	
1996	The Preacher's Wife	Penny Marshall	
1998	The Parent Trap	Nancy Meyers	First collaboration with Nancy Meyers
2000	Down to You	Kris Isacsson	
2000	What Women Want	Nancy Meyers	Second collaboration with Nancy Meyers
2001	America's Sweethearts	Joe Roth	
2003	Head of State	Chris Rock	
2005	Yours, Mine & Ours	Raja Gosnell	
2007	Enchanted	Kevin Lima	
2011	A Little Bit of Heaven	Nicole Kassell	

Editorial department
Year	Film	Director	Role	Notes
1969	Alice's Restaurant	Arthur Penn	Assistant editor	First collaboration with Arthur Penn
1970	Little Big Man	Arthur Penn	Assistant editor	Second collaboration with Arthur Penn
1972	Slaughterhouse-Five	George Roy Hill	Assistant film editor	First collaboration with George Roy Hill
1994	Baby's Day Out	Patrick Read Johnson	Additional editor	
1997	Flubber	Les Mayfield	Additional editor	
2003	Something's Gotta Give	Nancy Meyers	Additional film editor	Third collaboration with Nancy Meyers
2006	The Ex	Jesse Peretz	Additional editor	
2008	Nim's Island	Jennifer Flackett; Mark Levin	Additional film editor	

Sound department
Year	Film	Director	Role
1975	Dog Day Afternoon	Sidney Lumet	Sound editor

Documentaries

Editorial department
Year	Film	Director	Role	Notes
1973	Visions of Eight	Miloš Forman; Claude Lelouch; Yuri Ozerov; Mai Zetterling; Kon Ichikawa; John Schlesinger; Arthur Penn; Michael Pfleghar	Assistant editor	Third collaboration with Arthur Penn

TV movies

Editor
Year	Film	Director
1977	Johnny, We Hardly Knew Ye	Gilbert Cates
1977	The Deadliest Season	Robert Markowitz
1978	Holocaust	Marvin J. Chomsky
1978	Siege	Richard Pearce
1981	Skokie	Herbert Wise

Editorial department
Year	Film	Director	Role
1978	Holocaust	Marvin J. Chomsky	Supervising editor

Producer
Year	Film	Director	Credit
1979	Hollow Image	Marvin J. Chomsky	Producer
1980	Doctor Franken	Marvin J. Chomsky; Jeff Lieberman	Associate producer
1980	Death Penalty	Waris Hussein	Associate producer
1980	The Henderson Monster	Waris Hussein	Associate producer
1980	King Crab	Marvin J. Chomsky	Producer

TV series

Editor
Year	Title	Notes
1975	The American Parade	1 episode
1978	Holocaust	3 episodes

Editorial department
Year	Title	Role
1978	Holocaust	Supervising editor
