= Holocaust (miniseries) =

1978 American television miniseries initially aired on NBC

- Promotional poster
- Genre: Miniseries; Drama
- Created by: Gerald Green
- Written by: Gerald Green
- Directed by: Marvin J. Chomsky
- Starring: Joseph Bottoms; Tovah Feldshuh; Michael Moriarty; Meryl Streep; Rosemary Harris; James Woods; David Warner; Fritz Weaver; Sam Wanamaker; George Rose
- Theme music composer: Morton Gould
- Country of origin: United States
- Original language: English
- No. of seasons: 1
- No. of episodes: 4

Production
- Executive producer: Herbert Brodkin
- Producers: Robert Berger; Herbert Brodkin
- Cinematography: Brian West
- Editors: Craig McKay; Stephen A. Rotter
- Camera setup: Jimmy Turrell
- Running time: 475 minutes
- Production company: Titus Productions

Original release
- Network: National Broadcasting Company (NBC)
- Release: April 16 – April 20, 1978

Holocaust (full title: Holocaust: The Story of the Family Weiss; 1978) is an American television miniseries which aired on NBC over five nights, from April 16 to 20, 1978.

It dramatizes the Holocaust from the perspective of the Weiss family, fictional Berlin Jews Dr. Josef Weiss (Fritz Weaver), his wife Berta (Rosemary Harris), and their three children—Karl (James Woods), an artist married to Inga (Meryl Streep), a Christian woman; Rudi (Joseph Bottoms); and teenage Anna (Blanche Baker). It also follows Erik Dorf (Michael Moriarty), a fictional "Aryan" lawyer who becomes a Nazi out of economic necessity, rising within the SS and gradually becoming a war criminal.

Holocaust highlights numerous events which occurred both up to and during World War II, such as Kristallnacht, the construction of Jewish ghettos, the Nazi T4 Euthanasia Program, and, later, the construction of death camps and the use of gas chambers.

The miniseries won several awards and received positive reviews, but was also criticized. In The New York Times, Holocaust survivor and political activist Elie Wiesel wrote that it was "Untrue, offensive, cheap: As a TV production, the film is an insult to those who perished and to those who survived." However, the series played a major role in public debates on the Holocaust in West Germany after its showing in 1979, and its impact has been described as "enormous".

The series has been widely credited with bringing the term "Holocaust" into popular usage to describe the extermination of the European Jews.

== Plot summary ==
=== Part 1: The Gathering Darkness ===
1935: Karl and Inga celebrate their wedding in Berlin. Erik Dorf gets a job in the SS as right-hand man to top-level Nazi Reinhard Heydrich (David Warner).

1938: Dorf warns Dr. Weiss to leave Germany. Berta is adamant about staying. During Kristallnacht, Berta's father is attacked. Dorf impresses Heydrich by orchestrating the pogrom and gets promoted. Karl is arrested and sent to Buchenwald concentration camp. As a Polish citizen, Dr. Weiss is deported to Warsaw. The Weiss home is seized by a Nazi. Berta and the children move in with Inga's Nazi-supporting family. Rudi runs away.

1939: Dorf rises within Nazi society as he helps Heydrich plan the transport of Jews to occupied Poland. In Warsaw, Dr. Weiss serves as an Elder in the Judenrat (Jewish council) and works as a doctor serving the Jewish community.

=== Part 2: The Road to Babi Yar ===
1940: On New Year's Eve, a distraught Anna runs away and is soon gang raped by three SA stormtroopers in the street. Catatonic afterwards, Inga takes her to a doctor for help. He informs her that Anna's problems are best left to professionals and arranges her commitment to the Hadamar killing centre, where she and others suffering mental illness are gassed under the Nazi Aktion T4. Berta and Inga receive a letter from Hadamar falsely claiming they gave Anna every care; and that she died of pneumonia and malnutrition on June 3 after a period of refusing food or medicine. The letter informs the two women that they took the liberty of cremating Anna's body and buried her near the hospital. Rudi reaches German-occupied Prague. He falls in love with shopkeeper Helena (Tovah Feldshuh) after she saves him from SS troops. They make love in her shop and decide to run away together.

1941: Berta is transported to the Warsaw Ghetto. Reunited with Dr. Weiss, she becomes a schoolteacher. Inga travels to Buchenwald, where family friend Müller (Tony Haygarth) is an officer. In exchange for transferring Karl from the quarry, where he is being worked to death, Inga consents to have sex with Müller. Heydrich and Dorf order the commanders of the Einsatzgruppen to the Soviet Union to begin massacring Jews. Dorf finds himself forced to participate in an execution. After one of Dr. Weiss's nurses is executed for smuggling food for the ghetto's children, his brother Moses joins a Zionist resistance group. In occupied Kyiv, Rudi and Helena witness the Babi Yar massacre, along with Dorf. Dr. Weiss and the ghetto elders learn from a spy that the Nazis are exterminating the Jews. Dorf and family enjoy Christmas around Berta's stolen piano. They find Weiss family photos hidden in it. Dorf tells his daughter to burn them. Müller torments Karl with the knowledge that he extorts sex from Inga once a month, in exchange for passing her letters to Karl.

1942: Heydrich and Dorf convene the Wannsee Conference, at which the "Final Solution" is planned. Rudi and Helena join up with Jewish partisans.

=== Part 3: The Final Solution ===
1942: Karl is transferred to the propaganda art studio at Theresienstadt, the paradise ghetto in Czechoslovakia, maintained by the Nazis to fool Red Cross and neutral observers. Karl and the other artists secretly sketch the brutal reality of the camp. While living among the partisans, Rudi marries Helena. Dorf and Heydrich accompany Himmler to a mass shooting. Disgusted by how grisly it is, Himmler demands a more efficient murder method be found. Dorf attends a demonstration of a gas van. The partisans ambush a group of Ukrainian Trawnikis. Rudi is traumatized when he must kill one. Moses smuggles guns into the Warsaw ghetto. Himmler, Heydrich and Dorf plan the expansion of Auschwitz into a mass killing center. Inga convinces Müller, who has fallen in love with her, to denounce her and have her sent to Theresienstadt, where she joins Karl. After Heydrich's assassination, Dorf oversees construction of the death camps, choosing the pesticide Zyklon B for mass extermination. Some of Karl's sketches are discovered by the Nazis. Dorf has Karl and the other artists tortured, but they refuse to reveal where the rest of their sketches are. Dr. Weiss and the ghetto elders are ordered to select 6000 Jews a day for transport to Treblinka for extermination.

=== Part 4: The Saving Remnant ===
1942: Dorf asks for a transfer back to Berlin, which is denied. His wife Marta reassures him that what he is doing is right. Dorf tours Auschwitz and observes the murder of Jews in the gas chambers. Dr. Weiss is caught saving Jews from the transport trains by falsely claiming they have contagious illnesses. He and Berta are sent to Auschwitz. Rudi is injured when the partisans attack a German barracks. Karl learns Inga is pregnant, just before he is sent to Auschwitz.

1943: Moses and the Zionists start the Warsaw Ghetto Uprising. Berta and the women of her barracks are gassed. After three weeks of resistance, the Uprising is suppressed. Moses and the survivors are shot to death. Dorf learns his uncle is protecting Jews on a road construction project. Dorf has them all, including Dr. Weiss, sent to the gas chamber. Most of the partisans, including Helena, are killed during a botched attack on German troops. Rudi is sent to Sobibór death camp. He escapes during the Sobibór uprising.

1945: As Auschwitz is evacuated, Karl is found dead in his barracks, slumped over one final sketch. Dorf is captured by the United States Army. Told he will be tried for war crimes, he says he was only following orders. Confronted by photographic evidence of the atrocities, he commits suicide by taking a cyanide pill. Rudi finds Inga in Theresienstadt after its liberation. She introduces him to her baby with Karl. She has named him Josef, after Dr. Weiss. She shows Rudi Karl's drawings, which she hid from the SS. They are to be given to a museum in Prague as a record of the Holocaust for future generations. Rudi joins a group smuggling Jewish orphans into Palestine.

== Cast ==
Starring

- Tom Bell as Adolf Eichmann (eps. 1–4)
- Joseph Bottoms as Rudi Weiss
- Tovah Feldshuh as Helena Slomova
- Marius Goring as Heinrich Palitz (ep. 1)
- Rosemary Harris as Berta Palitz Weiss
- Tony Haygarth as Heinz Müller
- Ian Holm as Heinrich Himmler (eps. 3–4)
- Lee Montague as Uncle Sasha (eps. 2–4)
- Michael Moriarty as Erik Dorf
- Deborah Norton as Marta Dorf
- George Rose as Franz Lowy
- Robert Stephens as Uncle Kurt Dorf (eps. 1–2, 4)
- Meryl Streep as Inga Helms Weiss
- Sam Wanamaker as Moses Weiss
- David Warner as Reinhard Heydrich (eps. 1–3)
- Fritz Weaver as Dr. Josef Weiss
- James Woods as Karl Weiss

Also starring

- Blanche Baker as Anna Weiss
- Michael Beck as Hans Helms
- T. P. McKenna as SS Standartenführer Paul Blobel
- Cyril Shaps as KZ Inmate Weinberg

== Production ==
Holocaust was produced by Robert Berger and filmed on location in Austria and West Berlin. It was broadcast in five parts, from April 16 to April 20, 1978. The series earned a 49% market share. It was also well received in Europe.

The 9 1/2-hour program starred Fritz Weaver, Meryl Streep, James Woods, and Michael Moriarty, as well as a large supporting cast. It was directed by Marvin J. Chomsky, whose credits included ABC's miniseries Roots (1977). The teleplay was written by novelist-producer Gerald Green, who later adapted the script as a novel.

Artworks seen during the series's closing credits were created by Lithuanian–Jewish artist Arbit Blatas. Karl's paintings were created by Austrian painter Georg Eisler.

The miniseries was rebroadcast on NBC from September 10 to September 13, 1979.

== Home media ==
In the U.S., Holocaust was released as a Region 1 DVD by Paramount Pictures and CBS Home Entertainment on May 27, 2008. The release of the Region 2 DVD followed on 15 August 2010. A disclaimer on the DVD packaging states that it may be edited from the original network broadcast version, and it is shorter at 446 mins. The Region 4 DVD is unusually in native NTSC format, not having been converted to PAL. No information about the cut in footage has been released.

In the U.S. and Canada, a 452-minute version was released as a two-disc Blu-ray set on September 24, 2019.

== Reception ==
Holocaust was watched by an estimated 120 million viewers in the United States when it was first broadcast in 1978.

Some critics accused the miniseries of trivializing the Holocaust, "turning genocide into a soap opera, and tragedy into popular entertainment".

The television critic Clive James commended the production. Writing in The Observer (reprinted in his collection The Crystal Bucket), he commented:

The German Jews were the most assimilated in Europe. They were vital to Germany's culture—which, indeed, has never recovered from their extinction. They couldn't see they were hated in direct proportion to their learning, vitality and success. The aridity of the Nazi mind was the biggest poser the authors had to face. In creating Erik Dorf they went some way towards overcoming it. Played with spellbinding creepiness by Michael Moriarty, Erik spoke his murderous euphemisms in a voice as juiceless as Hitler's prose or Speer's architecture. Hitler's dream of the racially pure future was of an abstract landscape tended by chain-gangs of shadows and crisscrossed with highways bearing truckloads of Aryans endlessly speeding to somewhere undefined. Dorf sounded just like that: his dead mackerel eyes were dully alight with a limitless vision of banality.

The historian Tony Judt described the series as "the purest product of American commercial television — its story simple, its characters mostly two-dimensional, its narrative structured for maximum emotional impact" and he also wrote that, when it is shown in Continental Europe, it was "execrated and abominated by European cinéastes from Edgar Reitz to Claude Lanzmann" and he responded to these negative reviews of the miniseries by noting that "these very limitations account for the show's impact", especially in West Germany, where it was aired over four consecutive nights in January 1979 and coincided with public interest in the Majdanek trials.

Georg Leber and other SPD politicians viewed the US broadcast of the miniseries. Leber praised it after returning home, and his party urged its broadcast in Germany. Broadcast on WDR, the viewership was estimated to consist of up to 15 million households or 20 million people, approximately 50% of West Germany's entire adult population. Judt described the public interest as "enormous". 32% of all West German televisions showed the first episode, and 39% the last. Trade union meetings were canceled "so that people could see it, because otherwise they would disappear at nine o'clock anyway", DGB said. University seminars discussed the series. Single people gathered to watch it together "because they would not have been able to stand it alone at home", a pastor said.

Before the first episode of Holocaust, education departments distributed brochures and organized seminars. After each part was aired, a companion show was aired in which a panel of historians answered viewers' questions by telephone. Thousands of shocked and outraged Germans called the panels. The German historian Alf Lüdtke wrote that the historians "could not cope" because thousands of angry viewers asked how such acts had happened. Despite the late broadcasting times almost half the audience of the miniseries watched the panels, and 30,000 callers—four times the amount during similar programs in the United States—overwhelmed stations' telephone lines.

During an introductory documentary, Final Solution, that preceded the first broadcast of the series in Germany, bomb attacks were made on transmission towers near Koblenz and Münster. Security increased at television stations and towers, and the publicity reportedly increased viewership of the miniseries. Peter Naumann, a right-wing terrorist with two accomplices, was responsible. At the Koblenz transmitter, the supply cables were damaged, and the transmitter failed for one hour. Several hundred thousand television viewers could not see the program during this time. Naumann later became a politician with the NPD. American neo-Nazis initially demanded that NBC cancel the series from airing (calling it "libelous" towards German Americans) and then requested that the network give them the same primetime slots and hours to provide an "alternative" (pro-Nazi) view of WWII; NBC ignored both demands, but after some newspapers reported on neo-Nazi claims that the violent and harrowing material of the miniseries would damage viewers, a "parental discretion advised" card was included before each of the four airing nights.

The Polish community in the United States found the miniseries controversial and inaccurate. It argued against the portrayal of soldiers as Polish military who supervised transports of Jews and killed them during the Warsaw Ghetto Uprising. It noted that many Poles were also killed in the concentration and death camps.

In 1982, during the rule of the military dictatorship of Chile, the series was censored by Televisión Nacional de Chile, beginning a dispute that ended when its programming director Antonio Vodanovic renounced the channel.

== Awards ==
Holocaust won Emmy Awards for Outstanding Limited Series, as well as acting awards for Meryl Streep, Moriarty, and Blanche Baker. Morton Gould's music score was nominated for an Emmy and a Grammy Award for Best Album of Original Score for a Movie or a Television Program. Co-stars David Warner, Sam Wanamaker, Tovah Feldshuh, Fritz Weaver, and Rosemary Harris were all nominated for, but did not win, Emmys. However, Harris won a Golden Globe Award (for Best TV Actress – Drama) for her performance, as did Moriarty (for Best TV Actor – Drama).

== Influence ==
The series has been widely credited with bringing the term holocaust into popular usage to describe the extermination of the European Jews. Heinz Werner Hübner of WDR stated that while many works had depicted the extermination ("broadcasters had filmed dozens of books ... [claiming that] the topic played no role in the media between 1950 and 1979 is simply wrong"), he was among the majority of Germans who before the miniseries did not know of the word as a name for the event. After its broadcast, Der Spiegel said, the American import word "was on everyone's lips, right up to Helmut Schmidt and Helmut Kohl". The Gesellschaft für deutsche Sprache ranked the term "Holocaust" as the German Word of the Year for the publicity associated with it.

After the German broadcast in 1979, the West German parliament removed the statute of limitations on war crimes. The series is credited with educating many Germans, particularly what was then the younger generation, about the scale of common people's participation in the Holocaust. Der Spiegel stated that Holocaust "managed to do what hundreds of books, plays, films and TV broadcasts, thousands of documents and all concentration camp trials in three decades of postwar history had failed to do: to inform Germans about the crimes committed against the Jews in their name in such a way that millions were shaken".

On its fortieth anniversary, in January 2019, the series was rebroadcast on German television, in connection with Alice Agneskirchner's documentary, How the Holocaust Came to TV, which described the impact of the broadcast on the original German audience. A survey at the time of the article showed that fewer than half of all German school children had any knowledge of the Auschwitz concentration camp.

The Canadian author Malcolm Gladwell has suggested that the airing of the miniseries was a tipping point for wider public awareness, discussion, and acknowledgement of The Holocaust. There were few museums on the subject in North America but several more soon followed.

== See also ==
- List of Holocaust films
- Warsaw Ghetto Uprising
