= The Paper Chase (TV series) =

American drama television series

- Title screen
- Genre: Drama
- Based on: The Paper Chase by John Jay Osborn Jr.
- Developed by: James Bridges
- Starring: John Houseman; James Stephens; Tom Fitzsimmons; Robert Ginty; James Keane; Jonathan Segal; Francine Tacker; Deka Beaudine; Jane Kaczmarek; Michael Tucci
- Composers: Stephen Seretan (1.0, 1.1, 1.5, 1.7, 1.8, 1.15, 1.16, 1.17, 1.18, 1.19, 1.20); Charles Fox (1.2, 1.3); Thomas Newman (1.21); Richard Shores (1.4, 1.6, 1.7, 1.9, 1.10, 1.11, 1.12)
- Country of origin: United States
- Original language: English
- No. of seasons: 4
- No. of episodes: 59 (list of episodes)

Production
- Executive producers: Lynn Roth; Robert C. Thompson
- Producers: Albert Aley; Robert Lewin; Ernest A. Losso
- Cinematography: Gene A. Talvin
- Editors: Axel Hubert Sr.; Rod Stephens
- Running time: 60 minutes
- Production company: 20th Century Fox Television

Original release
- Network: CBS
- Release: September 9, 1978 – April 24, 1979
- Network: Showtime
- Release: April 15, 1983 – August 9, 1986

The Paper Chase is a 1978 American drama television series based on the 1971 novel of the same title by John Jay Osborn Jr., and a 1973 film adaptation. It follows the lives of law student James T. Hart and his classmates at an unnamed law school, modeled on Harvard Law School.

== Plot overview ==
=== Season 1 ===
James T. Hart is a law student from rural Minnesota who enters the intensely competitive environment of a prestigious law school specifically to study with Professor Charles W. Kingsfield, the world's leading authority on contract law. Kingsfield inspires both awe and fear in his students in his unremitting determination to prepare them for the practice of law.

To cope with the heavy workload, Hart joins a study group organized by Franklin Ford III. Ford is under immense pressure to succeed. His family has produced an unbroken string of outstanding lawyers going back generations, culminating in his demanding father, the senior partner in a very prestigious Wall Street law firm. The study group includes smooth woman-chaser Thomas Craig Anderson, slob Willis Bell, idealistic activist Elizabeth Logan, and struggling Jonathan Brooks, who is married to Asheley. Brooks drops out after he voluntarily confesses to cheating.

Hart works part-time at Ernie's Tavern to help pay his way through school. In the pilot, a waitress (Marilu Henner) shows him the ropes.

There was a four-year hiatus between the end of the first season and the start of the second.

=== Season 2 ===
Hart survives the first year with flying colors and joins the staff of the student-published Law Review (an honor reserved for the top students), under the leadership of Gerald Golden. He becomes romantically involved with first-year law student Connie Lehman, only to lose her when she wins a Rhodes Scholarship and goes to Oxford University. Later, he repeatedly clashes with Law Review rival Rita Harriman, herself a brilliant student, though he admits to Ford that he is perversely attracted to her.

=== Season 3 ===
Hart is now the president of the Law Review. The new students include Ford's younger brother Tom and former housewife Rose Samuels. The Ford brothers have to come to terms with their sibling rivalry. Rose deals with a surprise divorce and being so much older than her classmates.

=== Season 4 ===
This season consists of only six episodes, including a two-part finale in which Hart has to decide between taking a federal court clerkship or a position in a small private firm with idealistic goals after graduation. His decision is further complicated when he is invited to apply for a newly vacant faculty position at the school, an option opposed by Kingsfield, who believes he lacks the necessary experience. Hart, the top student in the graduating class, gives the commencement speech, bringing the series to a close.

== Cast ==
Ordered by number of credited episodes; only actors with eight or more episodes are listed.

Character	Actor	Notes	Seasons
James T. Hart	James Stephens	A brilliant and hardworking Minnesota-born law student who greatly admires Professor Kingsfield.	1–4
Prof. Charles W. Kingsfield Jr.	John Houseman	A professor of contract law, regarded as one of the legal field's foremost minds but acerbic and demanding of his students. Houseman appeared in all but one of the episodes, the exception being "A Case of Détente".	1–4
Franklin Ford III	Tom Fitzsimmons	Hart's closest friend in law school and the leader of his study group. Ford belongs to a multigenerational family of distinguished lawyers and feels pressured to live up to their example.	1–4
Willis Thomas Bell	James Keane	An abrasive member of Hart's study group.	1–4
Mrs. Nottingham	Betty Harford	Kingsfield's longtime secretary.	1–4
Gerald Golden	Michael Tucci	The top student in the class ahead of Hart's, and the president of the Law Review.	2–4
Vivian Conway	Penny Johnson	An African-American law student.	2–4
Rita Harriman	Clare Kirkconnell	A law student and Hart's fiercest competitor.	2–4
Laura Kiernan	Andra Millian	A law student.	2–4
Thomas Craig Anderson	Robert Ginty	A member of Hart's study group.	1
Elizabeth Logan	Francine Tacker	A member of Hart's study group with radical political views.	1
Martin Zeiss	Wortham Krimmer	A law student. Krimmer actually became a lawyer after his acting career ended.	2–4
Tom Ford	Peter Nelson	A law student and Franklin Ford's younger brother.	3–4
Rose Samuels	Lainie Kazan	An older law student.	3–4
Professor Tyler	Diana Douglas	A law professor, former head of the Securities and Exchange Commission.	3–4
Ernie	Charles Hallahan	Proprietor of Ernie's Tavern, where Hart works.	1
Jonathan Brooks	Jonathan Segal	A struggling member of Hart's study group.	1
Asheley Brooks	Deka Beaudine	Jonathan Brooks' wife.	1
Gagarian	Stanley DeSantis	A law student.	1
William James Stotz	Steve Levitt	A law student.	2–4
Eugene Soloway	Steven Peterman	A nerdy law student.	2–4
Dean Perry	Michael Prince	Dean of the law school.	2–4
Connie Lehman	Jane Kaczmarek	A law student and Hart's love interest.	2

== Production ==
=== Development ===
The CBS television network aired the series in the 1978–1979 season. John Houseman reprised his movie role, and James Stephens played Hart. Despite extensive critical praise, ratings were low and it was cancelled after one year; PBS subsequently rebroadcast all of the episodes. In 1983, cable network Showtime brought back the show with both Houseman and Stephens, as well as some other members of the original television cast. At the end of the fourth season, Hart finally graduates from law school.

=== Theme music ===
In the first year, the theme song was "The First Years", written by Norman Gimbel and Charles Fox, and performed by Seals and Crofts. In the pilot, the opening used an instrumental version, and the ending used a different vocal version. Starting in the second year, a classical instrumental piece replaced it.

=== Opening narrative ===
In the first year, the program opens with Professor Kingsfield, in class, saying, "The study of law is something new and unfamiliar to most of you—unlike any other schooling you have ever known before." After the theme song, he continues: "You teach yourselves the law but I train your minds. You come in here with a skull full of mush, and, if you survive, you leave thinking like a lawyer."

=== Pilot episode ===
The pilot episode had a different opening credits sequence which featured an instrumental version of the theme song, omitted Professor Kingsfield's opening narrative, and introduced the characters through the use of the class seating chart. It also featured a different female character, Linda O'Connor (played by Katharine Dunfee Clarke).

== Episodes ==
Season	Episodes	Network	Premiere	Finale	DVD release date
1	22	CBS	September 9, 1978	April 24, 1979	April 7, 2009
2	19	Showtime	April 15, 1983	August 21, 1984	December 15, 2009
3	12	Showtime	May 11, 1985	September 10, 1985	September 26, 2017
4	6	Showtime	June 28, 1986	August 9, 1986	January 23, 2018

== Awards ==
The show won the CableACE Award for Best Dramatic Series in 1985 and 1987.

== Home media ==
Shout! Factory has released the four seasons on DVD in Region 1.

DVD name	Ep#	Release date
Season One	22	April 7, 2009
Season Two	19	December 15, 2009
Season Three	12	September 26, 2017
Season Four	6	January 23, 2018

== Broadcast ==
=== Syndication ===
In the late 1980s, The Family Channel rebroadcast the entire series in a late-night time slot, at midnight Eastern Time. The series was later seen in the early 1990s on A&E, and in the early 2000s on GoodLife Television.

=== International broadcast ===
The series aired in the UK on BBC Two, in Venezuela (Alma Mater) and Colombia. The series aired on CBC TV 8 in Barbados in the 1980s. The series aired in South Africa, around the early 80's. It was dubbed into Afrikaans, and titled "Beste Professor", which, in English, means "Dear Professor".
