= Welcome Home, Johnny Bristol =

- Title card
- Written by: Stanley R. Greenberg
- Directed by: George McCowan
- Starring: Martin Landau; Jane Alexander; Brock Peters; Martin Sheen; Pat O'Brien; Forrest Tucker
- Music by: Lalo Schiffrin
- Country of origin: United States
- Original language: English

Production
- Producer: Arthur Katz
- Cinematography: Russell Morrison
- Editor: Carroll Sax
- Running time: 100 minutes
- Production company: Cinema Center 100 Productions

Original release
- Network: CBS
- Release: January 30, 1972

Welcome Home, Johnny Bristol is a 1972 television film written by Stanley R. Greenberg, directed by George McCowan and starring Martin Landau and Jane Alexander. The screenplay concerns a soldier returning from Vietnam, where he was a POW, who finds his home town missing. It is one of the earliest films to depict post traumatic stress disorder.

== Plot ==
Johnny Bristol, is a Vietnam veteran who, as a prisoner, kept his sanity by remembering his home town of Charles, Vermont. He recalls a happy town with picnics and band concerts in a small town atmosphere. All the while suffering in a cage from abuse, poor food and neglect. After he is rescued, he is sent to a VA hospital to recuperate. During therapy he and his nurse, Anne Palmer become engaged. The couple want to go to his home town, but when he tries to go there, he is told there is no such place as Charles, Vermont. When he insists there is such a place, he is treated as a crazy vet. Anne tries to help him find an explanation. Bristol becomes convinced that somehow the government is responsible for his home town's disappearance. Finally the real cause of his problem is found to be a repressed childhood memory of his parents being murdered right in front of him. In the closing scene Johnny and Anne visit Johnny’s childhood home, the place where his parents were murdered on the front steps. As the camera pulls back we see that it is located at the corner of Charles and Vermont streets.

== Cast ==
- Martin Landau as Johnny Bristol
  - Jean-Michel Michenaud as Young Johnny Bristol
- Jane Alexander as Anne Palmer
- Brock Peters as Berdahl
- Martin Sheen as Graytak
- Pat O'Brien as Sergeant McGil
- Forrest Tucker as Harry McMartin
- Mona Freeman aa Mrs. Bristol
- Jane Elliot as Sister Theresa
- Simon Scott as Colonel Anderson
- Alan Bergmann as Shusler
- James McEachin as Loughton
- John Hoyt as Minister
- Richard Evans as Franks
- Mark Roberts as Mr. Bristol
- Claudia Bryar as Mrs. Thysen
- David Fresco as Dr. Farraday
- Kathy Hilton as Virginia (uncredited)

== Legacy ==
From the outset Bristol is depicted as unwell, and his suspicions of a government conspiracy are considered preposterous and later proven untrue. Later films, especially in the 1980s (such as the similarly-named Welcome Home), presented stories in which the characters who make such claims are credible and proven true.
