= Espionage (TV series) =

British TV spy anthology series (1963–1964)

- 1963 title screenshot.
- Genre: Anthology
- Written by: Raymond Bowers; Norman Borisoff; John Furia Jr. David Greene; Donald Jonson; Ernest Kinoy; Albert Ruben; Halsted Welles
- Directed by: Robert Butler; Fielder Cook; David Greene; Ray Herbert; Herbert Hirschman; Seth Holt; Ken Hughes; William T. Kotcheff; Anton M. Leader; Michael Powell; Stuart Rosenberg; James Sheldon
- Composers: Malcolm Arnold; Benjamin Frankel
- Countries of origin: United Kingdom; United States
- Original language: English
- No. of series: 1
- No. of episodes: 24

Production
- Executive producer: Herbert Hirschman
- Producer: George Justin
- Running time: 48 min.
- Production companies: ATV; ITC Productions

Original release
- Network: ITV (UK); NBC (USA)
- Release: 2 October 1963 – 20 May 1964

Espionage is a British TV spy anthology series broadcast on the ITV network in the UK and on NBC in the USA for a single series in the autumn of 1963. Its American run lasted from October 2, 1963, until September 2, 1964.

== Synopsis ==
Made from actual case histories, episodes used newsreel and documented narratives to show the activities of spies from various countries as far back as the American Revolution and as recent as the Cold War.

== Guest cast ==
Featured guest stars included:

- Martin Balsam
- David Kossoff
- Dennis Hopper
- Patricia Neal
- Joan Hickson
- Patrick Troughton
- Billie Whitelaw
- Patrick Cargill
- Jill Bennett
- Millicent Martin
- Anthony Quayle – a real-life "spy" with the Special Operations Executive during World War II.

== Production ==
Herbert Hirschman and Herbert Brodkin were the producers.

In the United States, the series was broadcast from 9 to 10 p.m. Eastern Time on Wednesday nights.

== Episode list ==
This list is in NBC's airdate order.

Title	Air date (NBC)	Air date (ITV)	Director	Stars
A Covenant with Death	2 October 1963	12 October 1963	Stuart Rosenberg	David Kossoff, Aubrey Morris, George Roubicek, John G. Heller, David Davies
The Weakling	9 October 1963	19 October 1963	Stuart Rosenberg	John Gregson, Dennis Hopper, Patricia Neal, Steve Plytas, Roger Avon
The Incurable One	16 October 1963	5 October 1963	Stuart Rosenberg	Ingrid Thulin, Steven Hill, Frederick Schiller, Martin Miller, Norman Mitchell, Andrew Sachs
The Gentle Spies	23 October 1963	26 October 1963	David Greene	Barry Foster, Angela Douglas, Godfrey Quigley, Joan Hickson, Michael Hordern, Eric Pohlmann
He Rises on Sunday and We on Monday	30 October 1963	2 November 1963	David Greene	T. P. McKenna, Patrick Troughton, Billie Whitelaw, Andrew Keir, Maurice Good
To the Very End	6 November 1963	16 November 1963	David Greene	James Fox, Michael Anderson Jr., Clifford Evans, Robert Cawdron, Roy Patrick
The Dragon Slayer	13 November 1963	9 November 1963	William T. Kotcheff	Sam Kydd, Patrick Cargill, Thorley Walters, Peter Dyneley, Alan Tilvern, Cyril Shaps, Ric Young, Stephen Jack, Michael Chow, Kristopher Kum, Milton Reid
The Whistling Shrimp	20 November 1963	21 December 1963	Stuart Rosenberg	Dana Elcar
The Light of a Friendly Star	4 December 1963	30 November 1963	James Sheldon	Carl Schell, Loretta Parry, Ronald Howard, Donald Pickering, George Pravda, John Herrington, Ian Fleming
Festival of Pawns	11 December 1963	14 December 1963	James Sheldon	Diane Cilento, Sam Wanamaker, Peter Howell, Dennis Edwards, Mark Hardy
A Camel to Ride	18 December 1963	28 March 1964	Fielder Cook	Bill Travers, Marne Maitland, Roger Delgado, Sandor Elès, Vernon Dobtcheff, Derek Sydney, Anthony Jacobs, Edward Underdown, Gertan Klauber, Tracy Connell
Never Turn Your Back on a Friend	1 January 1964	4 January 1964	Michael Powell	Mark Eden, Donald Madden, Julian Glover, Pamela Brown
Medal for a Turned Coat	15 January 1964	11 January 1964	David Greene	Nigel Stock, Fritz Weaver, Joseph Fürst, Sylvia Kay, Richard Carpenter, Michael Wolf, Carl Conway, David Blake Kelly
The Final Decision	22 January 1964	18 January 1964	Ray Herbert	Martin Balsam, Alan Gifford, Ann Lynn, Richard Marner, James Maxwell, Gordon Sterne
Do You Remember Leo Winters?	29 January 1964	25 January 1964 (Note: This episode appears to have also aired in the UK on 29 February 1964. Either this is a repeat or the earlier showing was pulled and hence rescheduled.)	Robert Butler	George A. Cooper, Peter Madden, Cyril Luckham, Rhoda Lewis, Brian Peck, Mostyn Evans, Alan Haywood, David Healy
We the Hunted	5 February 1964	29 February 1964	Ken Hughes	Joseph Campanella, Anthony Dawson
The Frantick Rebel	12 February 1964	1 February 1964	Michael Powell	Roger Livesey, Stanley Baxter, Jill Bennett, Bernard Bresslaw, Max Adrian, Graham Crowden, Gordon Gostelow, Edward Jewesbury, Declan Mulholland, Edna Doré, Patsy Byrne, Pauline Boty
Castles in Spain	19 February 1964	8 February 1964	Anton M. Leader	Roland Culver, David Spenser
Snow on Mount Kama	26 February 1964	15 February 1964	David Greene	Bernard Lee, Nigel Davenport, Geoffrey Chater, Howard Lang, Ilario Bisi-Pedro
Once a Spy ...	4 March 1964	22 February 1964	David Greene	Peter Vaughan, Millicent Martin, Earl Cameron, William Lucas, Basil Dignam, Harry Landis, Eric Thompson, Shay Gorman, Glynn Edwards, Dickie Owen, Tom Bowman
The Liberators	11 March 1964	7 March 1964	Seth Holt	Donald Pleasence, Leonard Sachs, Jeremy Spenser, John Bennett, Robert Webber
Some Other Kind of World	18 March 1964	14 March 1964	Herbert Hirschman	John Hollis, Alan Tilvern, George Pastell, Jeffry Wickham, David Healy, Bruce Boa, John Tillinger, Richard Marner
A Free Agent	21 March 1964	21 March 1964	Michael Powell	Anthony Quayle, Siân Phillips, Norman Foster, John Abineri, Gertan Klauber
A Tiny Drop of Poison	20 May 1964	7 December 1963	Herbert Hirschman	Louise Sorel, Jim Backus, Jack May, Charles Lloyd-Pack

== Critical response ==
Cynthia Lowry, in a review of the premiere episode for the Associated Press, wrote, "It was well produced and had a fine cast of actors". She added that the series "promises to be a most interesting addition to the network schedule."
