= Lusitano (disambiguation) =

Lusitano is a Portuguese horse breed.

Lusitano may also refer to:

== People ==
- Vicente Lusitano, Portuguese composer
- Vieira Lusitano, Portuguese painter
- Amato Lusitano, Portuguese physician

== Sports ==
- US Créteil-Lusitanos, French football club
- US Lusitanos Saint-Maur, French football club
- Lusitano F.C. (Portugal), Portuguese football club
- Lusitano F.C. (South Africa), a team from Johannesburg
- Lusitano FCV, Portuguese football club
- Luzitano Futebol Clube, Brazilian football club
- Lusitano G.C., Portuguese football club
- Gremio Lusitano, American soccer team
- Ludlow Lusitano, American soccer team
- Lusitanos XV, Portuguese rugby union club

== See also ==
- Lusitania (disambiguation)
- Lusitanops, a genus of sea snails
- Lusitanosaurus, dinosaur
- Integralismo Lusitano, Portuguese political movement
