= Center Stage (TV series) =

American TV anthology series (1954)

- Genre: Dramatic anthology
- Country of origin: United States
- Original language: English
- No. of seasons: 1

Production
- Executive producer: Herbert Brodkin

Original release
- Network: ABC
- Release: June 1 – September 21, 1954

Center Stage is an American television anthology series that aired from June 1, 1954 to September 21, 1954, on the American Broadcasting Company as a summer replacement for The Motorola Television Hour. It aired on alternate weeks, swapping airings with the U.S. Steel Hour. The series was produced by Herbert Brodkin. There were nine episodes, one of which was written by Rod Serling. Among its stars were Walter Matthau, Charles Coburn, Lee Marvin, Barbara Nichols and Vivian Blaine, and Frank Wilson. Don Richardson was the director.

The premiere episode was "Chivalry At Howling Creek", starring Henry Hull, Cathy O'Donnell, and Jack Warden.
