= Eugene Roche =

American actor (1928–2004)

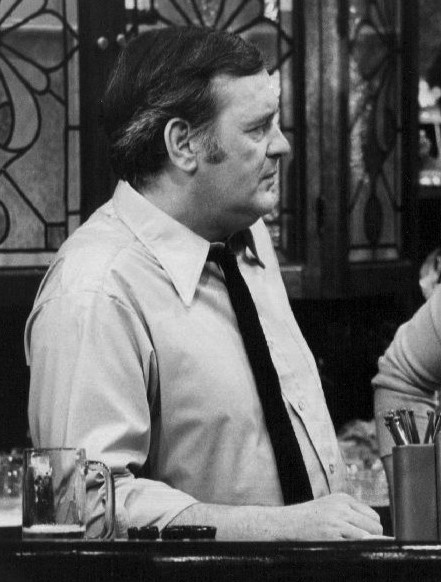
- Roche in a scene from The Corner Bar in 1973.
- Born: Eugene Harrison Roche; September 22, 1928; Boston, Massachusetts, U.S.
- Died: July 28, 2004 (aged 75); Encino, California, U.S.
- Occupations: Actor, commercial pitchman
- Years active: 1953–2004
- Spouses: Marjory Perkins (m. 1953; div. 1981); Anntoni Bratman (m. 1982)
- Children: 9

Eugene Harrison Roche (September 22, 1928 – July 28, 2004) was an American actor and the original "Ajax Man" in 1970s television commercials.

== Personal life ==
Eugene Harrison Roche was born on September 22, 1928 and raised in Boston, Massachusetts, the son of Mary M. (née Finnegan) and Robert F. Roche, who was at the time serving in the U.S. Navy. He served in the U.S. Army after graduating from high school.

He married Marjory Perkins in 1953. The couple had nine children, including actor Eamonn Roche and Emmy Award-winning writer/producer Sean Roche. They divorced in 1981. Eugene Roche remarried in 1982 and remained married to his second wife, Anntoni C. Roche (née Bratman), until his death in 2004.

== Career ==
After playing theater on various stages since 1953, Roche made his Broadway debut in 1961 as a bit player in the play Blood, Sweat and Stanley Poole with Darren McGavin and went on to appear in Mother Courage with Anne Bancroft in 1963, and in The White House with Helen Hayes in 1964. Television comedy became his forte with recurring roles on Soap, as Christine Sullivan's father on Night Court, Webster, and Larry Appleton's abusive boss on Perfect Strangers. Roche appeared as Pinky Peterson, one of Archie Bunker's buddies, on several episodes of All in the Family, in mostly comedic episodes. After a memorable performance as a prisoner of war who meets a shocking and sudden end in the film Slaughterhouse Five (1972), he had supporting parts in such feature films as The Late Show (1977), Foul Play (1978), and Corvette Summer (1978).

Roche played dramatic supporting roles as well, often playing deceptively ordinary men who are shown to be capable of ruthlessness, menacing violence or disturbing perversity. In Murder, She Wrote, he played a bad cop who attempts to kill Jessica Fletcher, and as a criminal mastermind posing as a Catholic bishop in the film Foul Play. He appeared in two episodes of Kojak. In 1977, he appeared in "Never Con a Killer" (the pilot episode for The Feather and Father Gang). He played alien Jor Brel in an episode of Star Trek: Voyager titled "Remember".

He made two appearances on Airwolf (once as Senator William Dietz in the pilot episode "Shadow of the Hawke", and again as Eddie in the episode "Firestorm" in season 2). Roche appeared in five episodes of Magnum, P.I. as Luther Gillis, an old style private eye. He is remembered for his recurring role as the Ajax Dishwasher in a series of television commercials and print advertisements.

He also made a guest appearance in the Honey, I Shrunk the Kids: The TV Show as Grandpa Murdock in the first episode, in which he swallowed everyone by accident.

== Death ==
Roche died on July 28, 2004, aged 75, at a hospital in Encino, California, from a heart attack.

== Selected filmography ==
- Splendor in the Grass (1961) .... Private Detective (uncredited)
- The Happening (1967) .... First Motorcycle Officer
- Cotton Comes to Harlem (1970) .... Lt. Anderson
- They Might Be Giants (1971) .... Policeman
- Crawlspace (1972, TV Movie) .... Sheriff Emil Birge
- Ironside (1972, TV Series) .... Marty, law school janitor
- Slaughterhouse-Five (1972) .... Edgar Derby
- Egan (1973) ... Detective Eddie Egan
- Newman's Law (1974) .... Reardon
- W (1974) .... Charles Jasper
- Hawaii Five-O (1975, TV Series) .... Ed Hudson
- Mr. Ricco (1975) .... Detective George Cronyn
- Kojak (1975, TV series) .... Patrolman Lyle 'Sandy' Beach / Seymore Haywood
- The Streets of San Francisco (1976, TV Series) .... Charlie Springer
- All in the Family (1976–1978, TV Series) .... Pinky Petersen
- The Late Show (1977) .... Ronnie Birdwell
- Quinn Martin's Tales of the Unexpected (1977, TV Series) .... Major Jim Langston
- Soap (1977–1981, TV Series) .... E. Ronald Mallu, Esq.
- The Ghost of Flight 401 (1978, TV Movie) .... Andrews
- Corvette Summer (1978) .... Ed McGrath
- Foul Play (1978) .... Archbishop Thorncrest
- The New Maverick (1978, TV Movie) .... Judge Austin Crupper, President 1st National Bank of Deming Texas
- Good Time Harry (1980, TV Series) .... Jimmy Hughes
- Alone at Last (1980, television pilot) .... Larry Elliot
- Rape and Marriage: The Rideout Case (1980, TV Movie) .... Gary Gortmaker
- Miracle on Ice (1981, TV Movie) .... Don Craig
- Taxi (1982, TV Series) .... Jack
- Magnum, P.I. (1983–1988, TV Series) .... Luther Gillis
- Off Sides (Pigs vs. Freaks) (1984, TV Movie) .... Chief Frank Brockmeyer
- Webster (1984–1986, TV Series) .... Bill Parker
- Airwolf (1984, TV Series) .... Eddie Donahough / Senator William Dietz
- Oh, God! You Devil (1984) .... Charlie Gray
- Night Court (1984–1988, TV Series) .... Jack Sullivan
- Hardcastle and McCormick (1985, TV Series) .... Joseph Allen Murphy
- Stranded (1986, TV Movie) .... Sullivan
- Highway To Heaven (1986, TV Series) .... Clancy
- Murder, She Wrote (1986, 1988, 1989, 1991, TV Series) .... Billy Simms / Lt. Aloysius Jarvis / Franklin Mayberry / Lt. Jack Boyle
- Take Five (1987, TV Series) .... Max Davis
- Perfect Strangers (1987–1988, TV Series) .... Harry Burns
- Eternity (1990) .... Ridley / Governor
- Lenny (1990, TV Series) .... Pat
- The Last Halloween (1991, TV Short) .... Grandpa
- Julie (1992, TV Series) .... I.F. 'Wooley' Woolstein
- Batman: The Animated Series (1992–1993, TV Series) .... Arnold Stromwell
- When a Man Loves a Woman (1994) .... Walter
- Roswell (1994, TV Movie) .... James Forrestal
- A Friend to Die For (1994, TV Movie) .... Priest
- Executive Decision (1996) .... Admiral Lewis
- Honey, I Shrunk the Kids (1997, TV Series) .... Grandpa Matthew Murdock
- The Woman Chaser (1999) .... Used Car Dealer
- Dancing at the Harvest Moon (2002, TV Movie) .... Gil Finnigan
