= F. Scott Fitzgerald and 'The Last of the Belles' =

1974 television film

- DVD cover
- Genre: Biography; Drama; Romance
- Based on: The Last of the Belles by F. Scott Fitzgerald
- Screenplay by: James Costigan
- Directed by: George Schaefer
- Starring: Susan Sarandon; Blythe Danner; Richard Chamberlain
- Theme music composer: Don Sebesky
- Country of origin: United States
- Original language: English

Production
- Executive producer: Herbert Brodkin
- Producer: Robert Berger
- Production location: Savannah, Georgia
- Cinematography: Edward R. Brown
- Editor: Sidney Katz
- Camera setup: Panavision Cameras and Lenses
- Running time: 98 minutes
- Production company: Titus Productions

Original release
- Network: ABC
- Release: January 7, 1974

F. Scott Fitzgerald and 'The Last of the Belles' is a 1974 American made-for-television biographical romance drama film directed by George Schaefer and starring Susan Sarandon, Blythe Danner and Richard Chamberlain. The film, which is known as The Last of the Belles in Australia, was written by James Costigan based on F. Scott Fitzgerald's 1929 short story "The Last of the Belles".

== Cast ==
- Richard Chamberlain as F. Scott Fitzgerald
- Blythe Danner as Zelda Fitzgerald
- Susan Sarandon as Ailie Calhoun
- David Huffman as Andy McKenna
- Ernest Thompson as Earl Shoen
- Richard Hatch as Bill Knowles
- James Naughton as Captain John Haines
- Albert Stratton as John Biggs
- Alex Sheafe as Philippe
- Sasha von Scherler as Jeanette
- Thomas A. Stewart as Horace Canby
- Norman Barrs as Waiter
- Earl Sydnor as Oliver
- Brooke Adams as Kitty Preston
- Cynthia Woll as Mary Bly Harwood
- Tom Fitzsimmons as Don Cameron
