= If You Give a Dance, You Gotta Pay the Band =

- Genre: Drama
- Written by: Stanley L. Gray
- Directed by: Fred Coe
- Starring: Donna M. Bryan; James Broderick; Georgia Burke
- Country of origin: United States
- Original language: English

Production
- Producer: David Susskind
- Cinematography: Mike Liberman; Jake Ostroff
- Editor: Arline Garson
- Running time: 73 minutes

Original release
- Release: December 19, 1972

If You Give a Dance You Gotta Pay the Band is a 1972 American TV movie. It was the first program shown under the umbrella ABC Theater.

The production (at the time referred to as a "dramatic special" or "teleplay" rather than a made-for-TV movie) was the first screen credit for Laurence Fishburne and led to him getting a role later on in the soap opera One Life to Live.

The teleplay first aired on ABC at 8:30pm ET on Tuesday, December 19, 1972 and was rerun on Wednesday, June 6, 1973 at 9:00pm ET. In TV listings of the era, the title was generally given as If You Give a Dance You Gotta Pay the Band without a comma.

== Plot ==
The story of ghetto boy and girl trying to raise money for the girl to visit her father in prison. It was shot on videotape in November 1972.
