= Herbert Brodkin =

American producer and director

- Born: November 9, 1912; New York City, U.S.
- Died: October 29, 1990 (aged 77); New York City, U.S.
- Education: University of Michigan; Yale School of Drama
- Occupations: Director, producer
- Years active: 1940s-1990
- Spouse: Patricia M. Brodkin (1917-1983)

Herbert Brodkin (November 9, 1912 – October 29, 1990) was an American producer and director of film and television.

Brodkin was best known as the producer of the television shows Playhouse 90, The Defenders, the miniseries Holocaust and the short-lived series Coronet Blue.

Brodkin was also the founder and president of Plautus Productions and also the co-founder of Titus Productions with Robert Berger in 1965.

== Early life and education ==
Brodkin was born to a Jewish family on November 9, 1912, in New York City, the youngest of six children born to parents Adolph (1873 – 1946) and Rose (Gutner) Brodkin. Brodkin's parents were both born in Russia. His father immigrated from Russia in 1887 and his mother in 1894. Brodkin had two older brothers; Nathanal and Milton (1904–1970), and three older sisters; Gertrude, Ethel, and Beatrice.

Brodkin graduated from the University of Michigan with a B.A. in 1934 and from the Yale School of Drama in 1940.

== Career ==
=== Broadway ===
Brodkin started his career as a scenic designer of the 1947 Broadway drama O'Daniel. He was also the scenic designer of many other plays. Eventually, Brodkin would be the production manager of the plays Texas, Li'l Darlin, (1949), and Something About a Soldier, (1962).

=== Television ===
Brodkin began his career in television in 1950 as a set designer at CBS. Brodkin achieved recognition a few years later and became a producer for many anthology programs of the 1950s including Center Stage, The Elgin Hour, The Alcoa Hour, Goodyear Television Playhouse, and Studio One.

Playhouse 90 was one of Brodkin's most memorable production credits. Beginning in 1956, the series was able to put Brodkin's expertise in the theatrical arts at work. The series ended in 1960. Another one of Brodkin's memorable production credits was the 1960s courtroom drama The Defenders. The series starred E.G. Marshall and Robert Reed as a father-and-son defense attorney team who, under the production of Brodkin, dealt with subjects such as euthanasia and blacklisting, subjects which, at the time, were very touchy for television. Brodkin also became famous for his use of close-ups and fast cuts in the series.

Some of the other television series that Brodkin produced were Brenner, The Nurses, For the People, and Coronet Blue, (all for CBS), Shane (for ABC), and Espionage (for NBC).

=== Film ===
Brodkin also produced several films throughout his career.

One of those films include the 1981 movie Skokie. Skokie was the true story of constitutional rights in Illinois. The movie's plot was based on the real life NSPA Controversy of Skokie, Illinois, in the late 1970s which involved the National Socialist Party of America. The movie starred Danny Kaye.

=== Plautus Productions/Titus Productions ===
In 1959, Brodkin founded and became the president of Plautus Productions. The company was responsible for series such as Brenner, The Defenders, The Nurses, Espionage, For the People, and Coronet Blue. In 1963, the company was sold to Paramount Pictures. The production company closed in 1967.

In 1965, Brodkin, along with producer Robert Berger founded Titus Productions. Titus Productions served as the production company for many of the TV shows and films that Brodkin produced including the miniseries Holocaust in 1978 and Doubletake in 1985, and the movies Skokie and Mandela. The company was acquired by the Taft Entertainment Company in 1981. The studio defunct in 1989.

== Personal life ==
Brodkin was married once to Patricia M. Brodkin (May 3, 1917–April 1, 1983).

== Death ==
Brodkin died on October 29, 1990, in New York City, New York at the Mount Sinai Hospital. He died of an aneurysm at the age of 77. He was eleven days shy of his 78th birthday.

He was preceded in death by his wife, Patricia Brodkin. He was survived by his two daughters; Lucinda D. and Brigit A. Brodkin. He was also survived by two older sisters; Pat Cutler, and Beatrice Forrest.

== Legacy and Honors ==
At Brodkin's alma mater, Yale School of Drama there are two scholarship and graduate programs established by Brodkin. They are The Herbert H. and Patricia M. Brodkin Scholarship and The Patricia M. Brodkin Memorial Scholarship.

The Herbert H. and Patricia M. Brodkin Scholarship was established by Herbert and Patricia Brodkin in 1963. The program is given to an outstanding student selected by the faculty of the school. The Patricia M. Brodkin Memorial Scholarship was established in 1983 by Herbert Brodkin, associates and friends in memory of his recently deceased wife Patricia. The program is awarded to a student of the school.

Brodkin was posthumously inducted into the Television Academy Hall of Fame in 1999. Other inductees that year included Carl Reiner, Fred Rogers, and Fred Silverman.

== Awards and nominations ==
- 1956: Nominated Emmy as Best Producer of a Live Television Series for The Alcoa Hour and Goodyear Television Playhouse (NBC).
- 1968: Nominated Emmy as Outstanding Dramatic Program for CBS Playhouse (CBS).
- 1969: Nominated Emmy as Outstanding Dramatic Program for CBS Playhouse (CBS).
- 1975: Nominated Emmy as Outstanding Special - Drama or Comedy for The Missiles of October. Shared with Irv Wilson and Robert Berger (ABC).
- 1978: Won Emmy as Outstanding Producer of a Limited Series for Holocaust. Shared with Robert Berger (NBC).
- 1982: Nominated Emmy as Outstanding Drama Special for Skokie (CBS).
- 1987: Won ACE as Movie or Miniseries for Murrow.
- 1989: Nominated ACE as Movie or Miniseries for Mandela (HBO).

== Filmography ==
=== Film ===
- Sebastian (1968) (Producer)
- The People Next Door (1970) (Producer)

=== Television ===
Year	Title	Role	Notes
1950-1951	Charlie Wild, Private Detective	Producer	2 episodes
1953	ABC Album	Producer	2 episodes
1954	The Motorola Television Hour	Producer	1 episode
1954	Center Stage	Executive Producer	Produced all episodes
1954-1955	The Elgin Hour	Producer	2 episodes
1955	The Philco Television Playhouse	Producer	1 episode
1955-1956	Alcoa-Goodyear Playhouse	Producer	3 episodes
1957	Studio One	Producer	4 episodes
1959-1960	Playhouse 90	Producer	6 episodes
1959-1964	Brenner	Executive Producer	
1961-1965	The Defenders	Executive Producer	
1962-1965	The Doctors and the Nurses	Executive Producer	
1965	For the People	Producer	
1966	Shane	Producer	
1967	Coronet Blue	Executive Producer	
1967	CBS Playhouse	Producer	Episode - Dear Friends
1968	CBS Playhouse	Producer	Episode - The People Next Door
1972	Lights Out	Producer	TV movie
1972	Crawlspace	Producer	TV movie
1973	Pueblo	Producer	TV movie
1973	Rx for the Defense	Producer	TV movie
1974	F. Scott Fitzgerald and 'The Last of the Belles'	Executive Producer	TV movie
1974	The Missiles of October	Producer	TV movie
1975	F. Scott Fitzgerald in Hollywood	Executive Producer	TV movie
1976	The Land of Hope	Executive Producer	TV movie
1977	The Deadliest Season	Executive Producer	TV movie
1978	Holocaust	Executive Producer	Miniseries
1978	Siege	Executive Producer	TV movie
1978	The Last Tenant	Executive Producer	TV movie
1979	Hollow Image	Executive Producer	TV movie
1980	Doctor Franken	Executive Producer	TV movie
1980	Death Penalty	Executive Producer	TV movie
1980	F.D.R.: The Last Year	Executive Producer	TV movie
1980	The Henderson Monster	Executive Producer	TV movie
1980	King Crab	Executive Producer	TV movie
1981	Skokie	Executive Producer	TV movie
1982	My Body, My Child	Executive Producer	TV movie
1982	Benny's Place	Executive Producer	TV movie
1983	Ghost Dancing	Executive Producer	TV movie
1984	Sakharov	Executive Producer	TV movie
1986	Murrow	Executive Producer	TV movie
1987	Night of Courage	Executive Producer	TV movie
1987	Mandela	Executive Producer	TV movie
1988	Stones for Ibarra	Executive Producer	TV movie
1988	Doubletake	Executive Producer	TV movie
1990	Murder in Black and White	Executive Producer	TV movie
1990	Murder Times Seven	Executive Producer	TV movie
