= Jonathan Segal (actor) =

American television actor

- Born: Jonathan Martin Segal; July 8, 1953; New York, U.S.
- Died: November 10, 1999 (aged 46); Pacific Palisades, California, U.S.
- Occupation: Television actor
- Years active: 1973–1999
- Parent: Alex Segal (father)

Jonathan Martin Segal (July 8, 1953 – November 10, 1999) was an American television actor. He was known for playing the role of Jonathan Brooks in the American drama television series The Paper Chase. He also played the recurring role of laboratory technician Jeff Sellers in the medical drama television series Quincy, M.E.
