= Tom Fitzsimmons (actor) =

American television actor

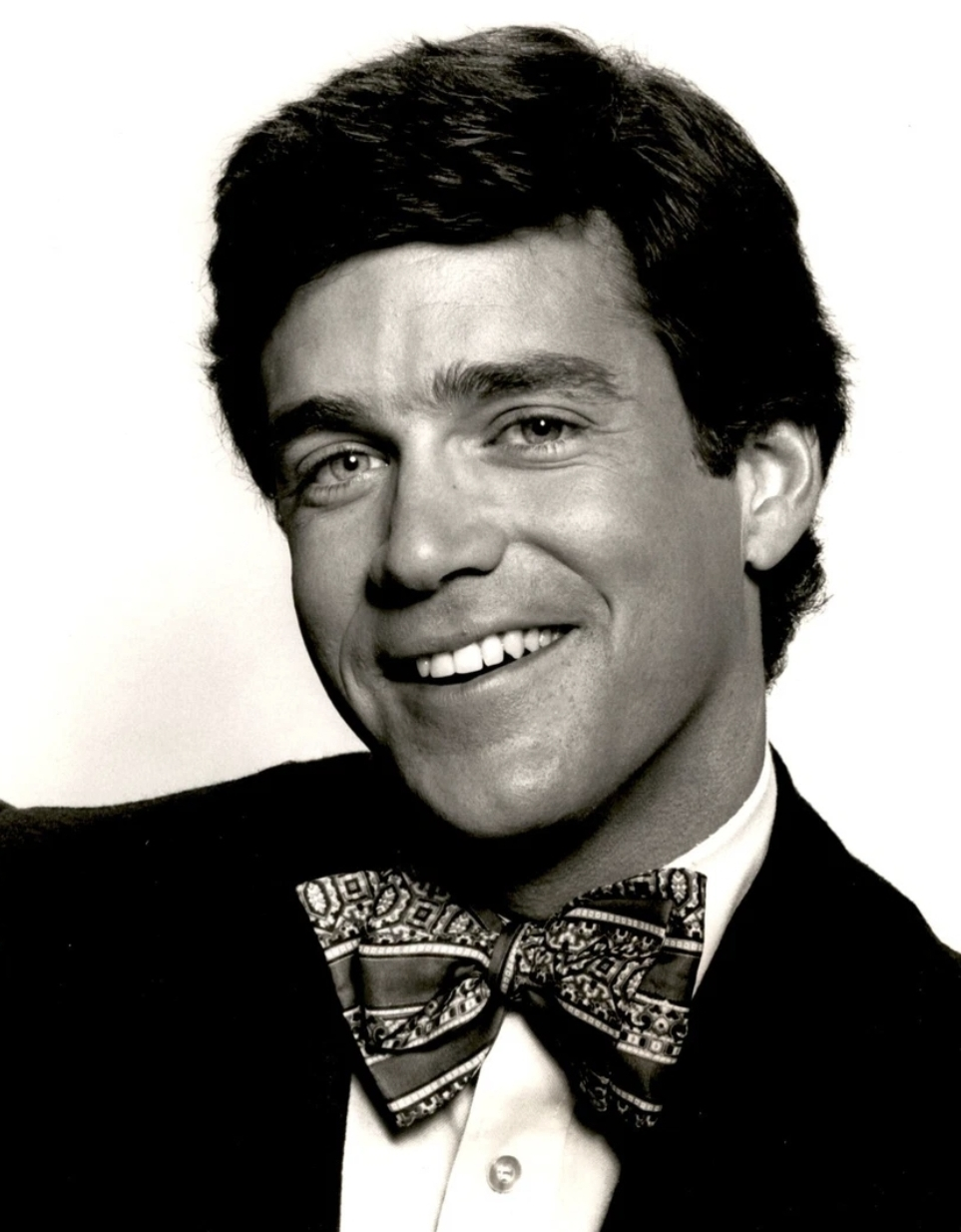
- Fitzsimmons in The Paper Chase, 1978
- Born: October 28, 1947 (age 78); San Francisco, California, U.S.
- Education: Fairfield College Preparatory School; Yale University (MFA)
- Occupation: Television actor
- Years active: 1974–2000
- Known for: The Paper Chase
- Partner: Tim Donoghue

Tom Fitzsimmons (born October 28, 1947) is an American television actor. He is known for playing Franklin Ford III in the American drama television series The Paper Chase.

== Life and career ==
Fitzsimmons was born in San Francisco, California. He attended Fairfield College Preparatory School. He then attended at Yale University, where he earned his Master of Fine Arts degree. After earning his degree, Fitzsimmons made his theatre debut in the Broadway play Scapino. He began his television career in 1974, where he first appeared in the soap opera television series Love of Life, where Fitzsimmons played Price Madden. Fitzsimmons guest-starred in television programs including The Bob Newhart Show, One Day at a Time, Baa Baa Black Sheep, Dallas, The Facts of Life, Murder, She Wrote and All in the Family.

In 1978, Fitzsimmons joined the cast of the CBS drama television series The Paper Chase, where he played Franklin Ford III. In 1980, he had an audition having his hair curled, in which according to The Republic he was a model. He played Dr. Meeker in All My Children. His last television credit was from the legal drama and police procedural television series Law & Order. But he did continue to act on stage into the late 1990s, such as in the 1999 play "Bedroom Farce" with his real-life partner Tim Donoghue.

== Personal life ==
Fitzsimmons is openly gay, and he lives with his partner, actor Tim Donoghue, in Roxbury, Connecticut.

== Filmography ==
=== Film ===
Year	Title	Role	Notes
1976	Swashbuckler	Corporal	Action adventure film
1984	Zombie Island Massacre	Ed	Horror film

=== Television ===
Year	Title	Role	Notes
1974	Love of Life	Price Madden	
1974	F. Scott Fitzgerald and 'The Last of the Belles'	Don Cameron	television film
1974	Great Performances	Fred Stevens	Episode: "June Moon"
1975	First Ladies Diaries: Martha Washington	Jackey	television film
1975	The Bob Newhart Show	Webb Franklyn	Episode: "What's It All About, Albert?"
1977	All in the Family	Frank	Episode: "Mike Goes Skiing"
1977	One Day at a Time	Dr. Ronnie Blanchard	Episode: "Julie's Operation"
1977	Black Sheep Squadron	2nd Lieutenant	Episode: "The 200 Pound Gorilla"
1981	The Facts of Life	Alex Garrett	Episode: "Free Spirit"
1981	Dream House	Arthur	television film
1986	Dallas	Doctor	Episode: "Blame It on Bogota"
1978-1986	The Paper Chase	Franklin Ford III	58 episodes
1987	Murder, She Wrote	Lewis Framm	Episode: "Trouble in Eden"
1995	All My Children	Dr. Meeker	
2000	Law & Order	Phil Amurski	Episode: "Mega"
