= List of ships named Lusitania =

Numerous vessels have borne the name Lusitania, named after Lusitania, an ancient Roman province corresponding to most of modern Portugal. The most famous was:

- RMS Lusitania (launched 1906), a British ocean liner operated by the Cunard Steamship Company, that a German U-boat sank in 1915 during World War I with the loss of 1,199 lives.

Other vessels include:

- Lusitania (1805 ship) that a French frigate captured in 1813 and released, and that between 1826 and 1830 made a whaling voyage to Timor and the waters around Papua New Guinea.
- SS Lusitania (1853) was a steamship built by John Laird at Birkenhead and launched in August 1853.
- SS Lusitania (1871) was an Orient Steam Navigation Company ocean liner wrecked off Nova Scotia in 1901
- SS Lusitania (1906), a Portuguese liner wrecked on Bellows Rock, Cape Point on 18 April 1911
- HMS Lusitania, the badly damaged sloop HMS Chanticleer, was a base ship at Horta, Azores from 1943 to 1945
