= My Body, My Child =

1982 television film directed by Marvin J. Chomsky

- Genre: Drama
- Based on: My Body, My Child by Louisa Burns-Bisogno
- Written by: Louisa Burns-Bisogno
- Directed by: Marvin J. Chomsky
- Starring: Vanessa Redgrave; Jack Albertson; Joseph Campanella; Stephen Elliott; James Naughton
- Theme music composer: Charles Gross
- Country of origin: United States
- Original language: English

Production
- Executive producer: Herbert Brodkin
- Producer: Thomas De Wolfe
- Production locations: Hendersonville, Tennessee; Nashville, Tennessee
- Cinematography: Tony Imi
- Editors: Robert M. Reitano; Ronald Roose
- Running time: 100 minutes
- Production company: Titus Productions

Original release
- Network: ABC
- Release: April 12, 1982

My Body, My Child is a 1982 American made-for-television drama film directed by Marvin J. Chomsky and starring Vanessa Redgrave. It was adapted by Louisa Burns-Bisogno from her play of the same name. The film premiered on ABC on 12 April 1982. It includes early performances by future Sex and the City co-stars, Sarah Jessica Parker and Cynthia Nixon. It is also the final television role of Jack Albertson, who was subsequently nominated posthumously for the Primetime Emmy Award for Outstanding Supporting Actor in a Miniseries or a Movie.

== Plot ==
Leenie is a middle-aged Irish-American schoolteacher with three grown daughters. She unexpectedly finds herself pregnant again and is delighted. However, her doctor rejects this possibility because of an unreliable blood test and her age. Thus her symptoms such as troubled sleeping and sickness are misdiagnosed as psychogenic. She is prescribed a host of medications to cope with these difficulties. It later turns out that she is in fact pregnant, and that these medications have been causing irreversible damage to her unborn baby. Faced with the truth that her child will be born with defects, she faces a decision to keep the baby or go against her religious beliefs and have an abortion.

== Cast ==
- Vanessa Redgrave as Leenie Cabrezi
- Jack Albertson as Poppa MacMahon
- Joseph Campanella as Joe Cabrezi
- Stephen Elliott as Dr. Gallagher
- James Naughton as Dr. Dan Berensen
- Gail Strickland as Adele
- Maia Danziger as Barbara "Bo"
- Kenneth Kimmins as Bill
- Stephen D. Newman as Dr. Fialkin
- Sarah Jessica Parker as Katy
- Cynthia Nixon as Nancy
- Alexandra Borrie as Jana
- Leon B. Stevens as Dr. Butler
- Charles Kahlenberg as Dr. Spoke
- Mavis Ray as Aunt Beasey

== Critical reception ==
John J. O'Connor of The New York Times praised the talent involved, but lamented that Burns-Bisogno's play was expanded from a small personal drama into a wider story with "tangential plots and subtexts, most of them having to do with the greed and sheer incompetence of the medical profession". He also noted that characters besides the protagonist are thinly sketched.

== See also ==
- Catholicism and abortion
