= Herbert Hirschman =

American television producer and director (1914–1985)

- Born: April 13, 1914
- Died: July 3, 1985 (aged 71)
- Occupation(s): Television producer, director

Herbert Hirschman (April 13, 1914 – July 3, 1985) was an American television producer and director. He produced shows as Perry Mason and the fourth season of The Twilight Zone. Hirschman died in July 1985 of an illness, at the age of 71.

== Filmography ==
Year	Title	Role	Notes
1979	The Scarlet Letter	Producer	PBS miniseries
1980	Stir Crazy	Man at Dinner Party	
1983	Brainstorm	Dr. Graf	(final film role)
