= Stanley R. Greenberg =

American screenwriter

Stanley R. Greenberg (1927—2002) was an American playwright and screenwriter. He was an important pioneer in the format of docudrama.

He was born in Chicago, served in World War II and graduated from Brown University. He got his start in television writing for the series The Defenders and The Nurses.

== Selected filmography ==
- Skyjacked (1972)
- Welcome Home, Johnny Bristol (1972)
- Soylent Green (1973)
- Pueblo (1973) (TV movie)
- The Missiles of October (1974) (TV movie)
- Blind Ambition (1979) (TV movie)
