= Marvin J. Chomsky =

American television and film director (1929–2022)

- Born: Marvin Joseph Chomsky; May 23, 1929; New York City, U.S.
- Died: March 28, 2022 (aged 92); Santa Monica, California, U.S.
- Education: Syracuse University; Stanford University
- Occupations: Director; producer
- Spouse(s): Tobye Kaplan (divorced); Christa Baum (separated)
- Children: 3
- Relatives: Noam Chomsky (cousin)

Marvin Joseph Chomsky (May 23, 1929 – March 28, 2022) was an American director and producer who worked both in television and film.

== Early life and career ==
Chomsky, born in the Bronx, is the son of Jewish parents who immigrated from the Russian Empire. He attended Stuyvesant High School in Manhattan, during which time he began working in radio, and later on, for a television show aimed at teenagers, while the medium was still in its early stages. He was graduated from Syracuse University with a bachelor's degree in speech in 1950, and from Stanford University with a master's degree in drama the following year. He also served in the U.S. Army, before pursuing a career in film and television. His early jobs included work as an art director, set decorator, and producer.

Chomsky was a prolific television director, and his career spanned from 1964 to 1995. During the late 1960s, Chomsky directed episodes of The Wild Wild West. He also directed episodes of Star Trek, Gunsmoke, and Hawaii Five-O. He also directed made-for-TV movies such as The Wacky Zoo of Morgan City (1970), Brink's: The Great Robbery (1976), Victory at Entebbe (1976), Attica (1980) and Billionaire Boys Club (1987). During the 1970s, Chomsky served as one of the directors for the miniseries Roots (1977), and he worked on other miniseries such as Holocaust (1978), Inside the Third Reich (1982) and Peter the Great (1986). He directed Vanessa Redgrave in the 1982 TV movie, My Body, My Child, the miniseries The Brotherhood of the Rose (1989) with Robert Mitchum, Peter Strauss and David Morse, and the TV movie Catherine the Great (1995), starring Catherine Zeta-Jones.

His feature film directing credits include Evel Knievel (1971), Live A Little, Steal A Lot (1975), Mackintosh and T.J. (1976), Good Luck, Miss Wyckoff (1979) and Tank (1984).

== Awards ==
Chomsky was the winner of Four Emmy Awards: Outstanding Directing for a Drama Series for Holocaust in 1978; Outstanding Directing for a Miniseries, Movie or Dramatic Special for Attica in 1980 and for Inside the Third Reich in 1982, and Outstanding Miniseries Peter the Great in 1986. (NATAS, IMDb)

== Personal life ==
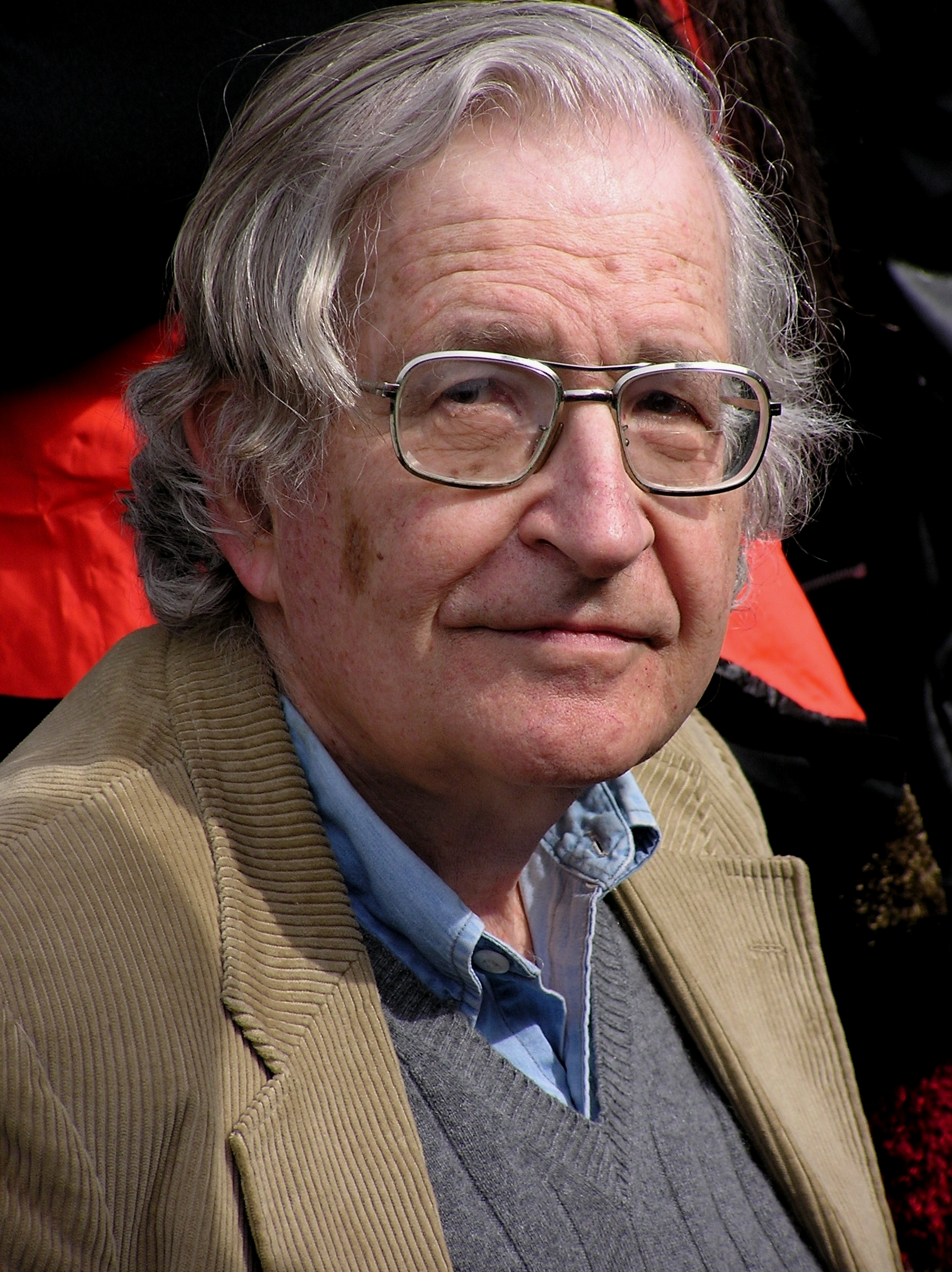
Noam Chomsky cousin of Marvin Chomsky

Chomsky was married twice, first to Tobye Kaplan, until their divorce, and then to Christa Baum, from whom he was separated at the time of his death. He had three sons, including Peter Chomsky, who is also a television producer. He was a cousin of linguist Noam Chomsky.

Chomsky died under hospice care in Santa Monica, California, on March 28, 2022, aged 92.
