= Robert Berger (producer) =

American film producer

Robert "Buzz" Berger (born February 9, 1934, in Chicago) is an American film producer.

Among other films, he was the producer for the Emmy Award-winning TV miniseries Holocaust.

== Partial filmography ==
- 1974 The Missiles of October
- 1978 Holocaust
- 1982 My Body, My Child
- 1987 Mandela (a film about Nelson Mandela)
- 1997 The House of Yes

== See also ==
- 1974 in film
