= Patricia Bosworth =

American journalist (1933–2020)

- Publicity Photo of Patricia Bosworth
- Born: Patricia Crum; April 24, 1933; Oakland, California, U.S.
- Died: April 2, 2020 (aged 86); New York City, U.S.
- Occupations: Biographer; journalist; memoirist; actress
- Spouses: Mel Arrighi (m. 1966; died 1986) Tom Palumbo (m. 2000; died 2008)
- Writing career
- Years active: 1958–2020
- Genres: Journalism, biography

Patricia Bosworth (née Crum, April 24, 1933 – April 2, 2020) was an American journalist, biographer, memoirist, and actress. She was a faculty member of Columbia University’s school of journalism as well as Barnard College, and was a winner of the Front Page Award for her journalistic achievement in writing about the Hollywood Blacklist.

== Early life ==
Born Patricia Crum in Oakland, California, Bosworth was the daughter of prominent attorney Bartley Crum and novelist Anna Gertrude Bosworth. She grew up especially close to her younger brother, Bartley Crum Jr. Their father was active in politics as a confidant to Wendell Willkie during the 1940 U.S. presidential election, and he served on the 1945 Anglo-American Committee of Inquiry into Palestine that advised President Harry Truman to support the creation of a Jewish state. The elder Crum gained renown for being one of the six lawyers who defended the Hollywood Ten during the Red Scare at the start of the Cold War in 1947. His career suffered during the fallout from the Blacklist, and the family moved from California to New York in late 1948.

In California, Bosworth was educated at Miss Burke's School and the Convent of the Sacred Heart. At age 13, intending to become an actress, she adopted her mother's maiden name as her surname. When the family moved to New York, Bosworth first attended the Chapin School; later, she went to the Ecole International in Geneva, Switzerland. Bosworth studied at Sarah Lawrence College, graduating in 1955 with a major in dance and writing.

== Career ==
=== Acting ===
While still a student at Sarah Lawrence, Bosworth began modeling for the John Robert Powers Agency. She was hired by Diane and Allan Arbus to pose for a magazine ad for the Greyhound bus company. Allan drove everyone, including his and Diane's assistant Tad Yamashiro (who later became an exhibited photographer himself), from Manhattan to the Ardsley Acres section of Ardsley, New York for the photo shoot.

Shortly after her college graduation, Bosworth became a member of the Actors Studio in Manhattan, where she studied under Lee Strasberg. Arthur Penn cast her as the lead in her first professional play, a pre-Broadway tryout of James Leo Herlihy’s Blue Denim, about the consequences of teenage pregnancy and abortion. Bosworth appeared in several Broadway shows during the 1950s and 1960s, including Inherit the Wind, Small War on Murray Hill (directed by Garson Kanin), and Jean Kerr's Mary, Mary (where she understudied from 1961 to 1965 before being cast as the lead for the end of the play's run). She played Elaine Stritch's sister in the drama The Sin of Pat Muldoon and a motormouthed teen based on the young Nora Ephron in Phoebe Ephron's comedy Howie. During this period, Bosworth toured in The Glass Menagerie, playing Laura to Helen Hayes's Amanda and Remains to be Seen with Tommy Sands. She worked regularly on popular television series, including Naked City, Kraft Theater (The Man That Didn't Fly - 1958) The Secret Storm, Young Dr. Malone, and The Patty Duke Show. Bosworth can be seen in the film Four Boys and a Gun as James Franciscus's wife and as a disgruntled redhead in the audience of Bert Stern’s 1960 cult documentary Jazz on a Summer's Day, about the 1958 Newport Jazz Festival.

As an actress, Bosworth is perhaps best known for playing Sister Simone, the young friend of Audrey Hepburn's character Sister Luke, in The Nun's Story (1959). Directed by Fred Zinnemann, the film was a box-office success and nominated for multiple Academy Awards. In 1958, upon learning she was cast in The Nun's Story, she learned she was pregnant. She received an abortion at an underground abortionist in Manhattan. Shortly after, she boarded a plane to Rome to meet Fred Zinnemann, where she began to hemorrhage. In Rome, she was sent to a hospital convent where she was to learn about being a nun. The nun discovered she wasn't feeling well due to the abortion and rushed her to the hospital for care. The film was delayed for her recovery.

=== Journalist ===
In the mid-1960s, Bosworth left acting to become a journalist. She gained notice as a writer with several Broadway-focused features and interviews published in New York magazine and The New York Times. In November 1965, she was one of three people on the staff of Screen Stars magazine. Subsequently she worked at Magazine Management Company with Mario Puzo, who was then beginning drafts of his novel The Godfather. From 1969 to 1972, Bosworth was senior editor of McCall's; she served as managing editor of Harper's Bazaar from 1972 to 1974. Penthouse founder Bob Guccione hired Bosworth as executive editor of the erotic women's magazine Viva from 1974 to 1976. During the 1970s and 1980s, Bosworth reviewed numerous books for The New York Times, wrote freelance art pieces for the Times, Time Life, and other national magazines, and she contributed a monthly column on arts and entertainment to Working Woman magazine.

Bosworth was an editor at Mirabella from 1993 to 1995. She was first hired as a contributing editor at Vanity Fair in 1984 under Tina Brown’s editorship of the magazine, and she served in this capacity until 1991. She continued to freelance for the magazine until 1997 when she rejoined as contributing editor under Graydon Carter’s leadership, a position she held to the end of her life. Her profile of Elia Kazan and his reflections on the Hollywood Blacklist, published in a spring 1999 issue of Vanity Fair, won Bosworth the Front Page Award from the Newswomen's Club of New York.

=== Author ===
Bosworth was the author of bestselling biographies on Montgomery Clift (1978), Diane Arbus (1984), Marlon Brando (2000) and Jane Fonda (2011). Her book, Montgomery Clift: A Biography explores how the actor's introverted approach to his craft influenced James Dean and many others. Bosworth, whose father had been Clift's lawyer in the late 1940s, had total access to Clift's family while doing research for the project. She also spoke to many of Clift's close friends and colleagues. Conversations between Bosworth and Brooks Clift appeared in Montgomery Clift's nephew’s documentary Making Montgomery Clift.

Bosworth's biography of Arbus, a photographer known for her poetic approach to eccentric and abnormal subjects, was a nuanced appraisal of the artist that also investigated the lurid details of her life, culminating in Arbus's 1971 suicide. The book was critically acclaimed. Andrew Holleran of New York magazine said it was "a biography that seems to have...more than enough material for several art legends...Patricia Bosworth has created a spellbinding portrait." Washington Post Book World reviewed it as "fascinating" and "a compelling biography.. as valuable in its insights into the cultural history of the 50s and 60s as its understanding of the special place Arbus occupies in it." However, the book proved to be extremely controversial, and it did not receive formal approval from the Arbus estate. Bosworth's work is still widely considered to be the definitive biography of Arbus; it was the inspiration for Steven Shainberg’s 2006 film Fur, which starred Nicole Kidman as Diane Arbus and Ty Burrell and Robert Downey Jr. as her husband and lover respectively.

According to Publishers Weekly, Bosworth's biography on Marlon Brando "offers a vivid reminder of the personal and professional highlights of Brando's life...[It is] an informative biography of Brando that, because of the limited format of the Penguin Lives series, hints at but cannot do justice to the great unruliness of Brando's career and life. She provides a fine, detailed sketch of his New York days when he took acting classes with Harry Belafonte, Elaine Stritch, Gene Saks, Shelley Winters, Rod Steiger and Kim Stanley, and presents a great portrait of the craziness on the set of Last Tango in Paris (co-star Maria Schneider announced that they got along 'because we're both bisexual')", but in only 228 pages, the author "can't approach the complexity of her earlier work."

Bosworth spent 10 years completing a biography of Jane Fonda, with whom she had attended sessions at the Actors Studio in the 1950s and 1960s. Fonda granted Bosworth total access; they met frequently throughout the research process for the book. Bosworth's biography Jane Fonda: The Private Life of a Public Woman was on the New York Times bestseller list in 2011 and was named one of Kirkus Reviews’ Best Six Books of the Year.

In addition to her biographies, Bosworth was the author of two memoirs. The first, Anything Your Little Heart Desires: An American Family Story, was published by Simon & Schuster in 1997. It tells the story of Bosworth's father Bartley Crum and how his decision to defend the Hollywood Ten at the height of McCarthyism destroyed his career, ultimately leading to his suicide. Anything was featured on the front page of the New York Times Book Review, and it was named a Notable Book of the Year in 1997. Following publication of this memoir, Bosworth became an active spokeswoman for suicide survivors and suicide prevention. She received the American Foundation for Suicide Prevention’s Lifesavers Award in 1998.

Her book The Men in My Life: A Memoir of Love and Art in 1950s Manhattan was published by HarperCollins in 2017. It examines Bosworth's career as an actress, her early transition into journalism, her first and second marriages, and ways she survived the suicides of both her brother and father.

In 2018, Bosworth released Dreamer with a Thousand Thrills: The Rediscovered Photographs of Tom Palumbo, published by powerHouse Books. The book features Palumbo's fashion photographs and celebrity portraits from the 1950s and 1960s as well as several works that never were published during his lifetime.

Bosworth was working on Protest Song at the time of her death. Protest Song (Farrar, Straus, & Giroux) is about Paul Robeson's work to create federal anti-lynching legislation, which her father collaborated, and J. Edgar Hoover's successful campaign to blacklist Robeson. Similar anti-lynching legislation to that proposed by Robeson and Crum was passed by the U.S. House of Representatives on February 26, 2020.

== Personal life ==
During Bosworth's sophomore year at Sarah Lawrence, her brother Bart Jr. committed suicide in 1953 at Reed College in Portland, Oregon. This event, and their father's suicide six years later in 1959, informed Bosworth's work throughout her life.

During her first year at Sarah Lawrence, Bosworth eloped with an art student. The marriage turned abusive, and it was annulled after 16 months. Bosworth married novelist and playwright Mel Arrighi in 1966; the two collaborated on several projects outside of their individual work. Arrighi died due to cardiac arrest and complications from emphysema on September 17, 1986.

Bosworth learned that she was pregnant on the same day that she was cast as Simone for the film The Nun's Story (released 1959). She underwent an underground abortion immediately before leaving for Rome and began to hemorrhage while on the plane. Production of the film was delayed as she recovered.

In the late 1980s, Bosworth was reintroduced to photographer Tom Palumbo, whom she had met decades earlier when Palumbo had been on staff at Harper's Bazaar and Vogue. Palumbo was then moving from photography into directing theatre. He and Bosworth worked on a number of plays together for the Actors Studio and Lincoln Center, including a production of The Seagull starring Laura Linney as Nina and Tammy Grimes as Arkadina. They married in 2000. Palumbo died due to complications from Lewy Body Dementia on October 13, 2008. After Palumbo's death, Bosworth joined the board of the Lewy Body Dementia Resource Center.

== Death ==
Bosworth died from pneumonia and complications of COVID-19 at Mount Sinai West hospital in New York City on April 2, 2020.

== Filmography ==
Year	Title	Role	Notes
1957	Four Boys and a Gun	Elizabeth	
1959	The Nun's Story	Simone	(postulant who changed her mind)

== Bibliography ==
- Montgomery Clift: A Biography. New York: Harcourt Brace and Bantam, 1978. (Reissued by Limelight Press, 1980)
- Diane Arbus. New York: Alfred Knopf and Avon, 1984. (Reissued by W.W. Norton, 1995 and 2005)
- Making Contact (play) in Best One-Act Plays of 1991-1992. New York: Applause Books, 1992
- Anything Your Little Heart Desires: An American Family Story. New York: Simon and Schuster, 1997. (Reissued by Touchstone, 1998)
- Marlon Brando. New York: Viking/Penguin, 2001. (Part of the Lives series)
- Jane Fonda: The Private Life of a Public Woman. New York: Houghton Mifflin Harcourt, 2011
- John Wayne: The Legend and the Man: An Exclusive Look Inside Duke's Archive. John Wayne Enterprises, with contributions by Bosworth, Ron Howard, Ronald Reagan, and Martin Scorsese. New York: PowerHouse Books, 2012
- The Men in My Life: Love and Art in 1950s Manhattan. New York: HarperCollins, 2017
- Dreamer with a Thousand Thrills: The Rediscovered Photographs of Tom Palumbo. New York: powerHouse Books, 2018
