= Metropolis (comics) =

City in the DC Universe

- First appearance: Action Comics #16 (September 1939)
- Created by: Jerry Siegel; Joe Shuster

In-universe information
- Locations: Ace o' Clubs; Daily Planet; Daily Star; Galaxy Communications; LexCorp; Project Cadmus; S.T.A.R. Labs
- Character: List: Agent Liberty; Argent; Atom (Ray Palmer); Black Lightning; Booster Gold; Bizarro; Bibbo Bibbowski; Bruno Mannheim; Cat Grant; Clark Kent/Superman; Dan Turpin; Morgan Edge; Funky Flashman; Mercy Graves; Professor Hamilton; Hank Henshaw/Cyborg Superman; Natasha Irons; Krypto; Conner Kent; Lex Luthor; Lena Luthor; Lois Lane; Lucy Lane; Lana Lang; Livewire; Metallo; Newsboy Legion; Neutron; Jimmy Olsen; Parasite; Pete Ross; Prankster; Professor Potter; Rampage; Maggie Sawyer; Silver Banshee; Steve Lombard; Steel (John Henry Irons); Streaky the Supercat; Supergirl (Kara Zor-El); Eve Teschmacher; Titano; Ron Troupe; George Taylor; Toyman; Perry White
- Publisher: DC Comics

Metropolis is a fictional city appearing in American comic books published by DC Comics, best known as the home of Superman, his closest allies and some of his foes. First appearing by name in Action Comics #16 (September 1939), Metropolis is depicted as the largest and most prosperous city in the United States, somewhere in the Northeastern part of the country. In recent years, it has been stated to be located in Delaware. The co-creator and original artist of Superman, Joe Shuster, modeled the Metropolis skyline after Toronto, where he was born and lived until he was ten. Since then, however, the look and feel of Metropolis has been greatly influenced by New York City.

Within the DC Universe, Metropolis is depicted as being one of the largest and wealthiest cities in the world, having a population of 11 million citizens.

In addition to Superman, the city is also home to other superheroes, such as Black Lightning, Booster Gold, Thorn, Gangbuster, Hawkgirl and others.

== Creation ==
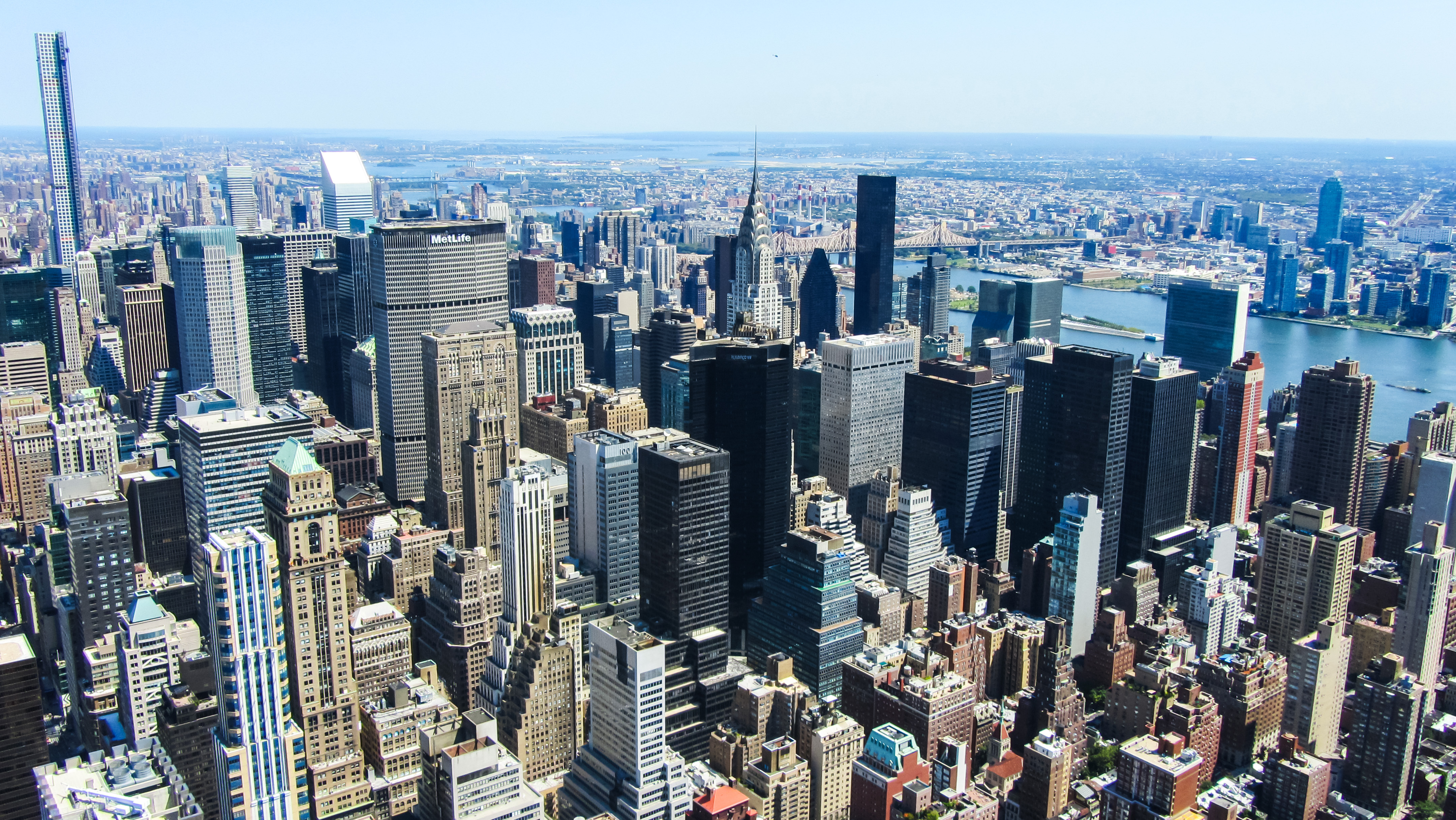
New York City is often cited as a real-life equivalent of Metropolis, and the landmarks in Metropolis are based on real places in Manhattan.

Like many other fictional cities in DC Comics, the location of Metropolis has varied over the years but is usually portrayed as a major city in the Northeast, sharing various qualities with New York City. Superman co-creator Joe Shuster moved to Cleveland at age ten, where he met co-creator and Ohio native Jerry Siegel.

Originally intending to sell the Superman strips to a Cleveland newspaper, they decided to set the stories there, but when the strips were re-used for the comic books, they changed the location to the fictional Metropolis. Shuster was quoted as having modeled his Metropolis cityscape on that of his hometown, Toronto, and in the early versions of Superman, Clark Kent worked for a newspaper called the Daily Star, modeled after the real-life Toronto Star. Action Comics #2, however, mistakenly portrays Clark Kent as a reporter for the Cleveland Evening News.

== Geography ==
In Superman #2 (Fall 1939), Metropolis was placed in the U.S. state of New York, making it the earliest specific reference to the location of Metropolis. In that issue, Clark Kent (Superman) sends a telegram to George Taylor, the editor of the Daily Star (the antecedent to the Daily Planet), addressed to "Metropolis, N.Y."

In the 1940s Superman cartoons, produced by Paramount Pictures, Fleischer Studios and Famous Studios, Superman is said to live on the island of Manhattan. In the seventh cartoon of the series, Electric Earthquake (1942), a Native American mad scientist claims that his people are the rightful owners of Manhattan, thus placing these cartoons on the island. In the fifth cartoon in the series, The Bulleteers (1942), the name of the city is identified as Metropolis, as the Bulleteers address in that cartoon the population of Superman's city as "citizens of Metropolis"; and in the thirteenth cartoon Destruction, Inc. (1942), Metropolis is even seen spelled out twice on the Metropolis Munition Works.

In a 1970s edition of "Ask the Answer Man", a column that ran occasionally in DC publications, it was stated that Metropolis and Gotham City were adjacent to New York City; across the harbor from each other. That same column stated that Green Arrow's home, Star City, was in Connecticut, Flash's Central City was in Ohio, and Hawkman's Midway City was in Michigan. An earlier issue of DC's fanzine Amazing World of DC Comics, however, stated that Metropolis was located in Delaware, while Gotham was placed in New Jersey. The 1990 Atlas of the DC Universe role playing game supplement, published by Mayfair Games, states that Metropolis is in Delaware.

In June 1976, Superman #300 featured an out-of-canon story about the infant Kal-El arriving on Earth in that year, triggering an increase in Cold War tensions between the United States and the Soviet Union. In that story's version of the year 2001, passing reference is made to the merging of the eastern seaboard cities from Boston to Washington, D.C., into a "newly incorporated urban center" called "Metropolis".

In his 1978 work, The Great Superman Book, an encyclopedia of the first forty years of the Superman comics, author Michael Fleisher cites many examples which demonstrate that Metropolis equates with New York City. The most blatant of these might be the statement he cites from Action Comics #143 (April 1950), which states that the Statue of Liberty stands in "Metropolis Harbor". The Statue of Liberty, in fact, stands in New York Harbor.

In the pre-Crisis on Infinite Earths comics, Smallville was often shown as being within driving distance of Metropolis, although with no definitive location. John Byrne's 1986 revamp of Superman cited the city as being in Kansas.

The 1992 "The Death of Superman" storyline depicts Doomsday on a path from Ohio through the state of New York, ending in Metropolis, and the 2005 comic Countdown to Infinite Crisis also places Metropolis in the state of New York.

The 2003 DC Comics/Marvel Comics crossover mini-series JLA/Avengers depicts the city as along the multi-state Interstate 95, which is the main highway on the East Coast of the United States, and portrays the corresponding location in the Marvel Universe as forests and fields, explaining that Marvel's Earth and DC's Earth have different surface areas to account for their different geography (no Metropolis on Marvel's Earth, no Latveria on DC's Earth, and so on).

On the television series Superman: The Animated Series, the second part of the episode titled "Little Girl Lost" depicts Darkseid's forces using a machine hidden in or around Metropolis to attempt to pull a comet into the earth. The beam from that machine is depicted originating from the area of the mid-western United States where Kansas is located.

Frank Miller has said that "Metropolis is New York in the daytime; Gotham City is New York at night." Gotham City is home to Batman, whose activities are more often nocturnal, while Metropolis is home to Superman, who usually operates during the day. In terms of atmosphere, Batman writer and editor Dennis O'Neil has said that, figuratively, "Batman's Gotham City is Manhattan below 14th Street at eleven minutes past midnight on the coldest night in November, and Metropolis is Manhattan between 14th and 110th Streets on the brightest, sunniest July day of the year". New York City has been more recently used as a locale in the DC Universe, like the Marvel Universe, in which it exists as a separate city from Metropolis and Gotham City. The Justice Society of America, for example, is based in New York, as were the Teen Titans.

In the DC Universe film franchise, Metropolis is located in Delaware, as confirmed by James Gunn, the writer and director of Superman (2025).

=== In relation to Gotham City ===
Superman flies over Metropolis. Artwork by Alex Ross.

Metropolis is frequently depicted as being within driving distance of Gotham City, home of Batman. This happens, for example, in the three-issue 1990 mini-series of World's Finest Comics by Dave Gibbons, Steve Rude, and Karl Kesel. The distance between the two cities has varied greatly over the years, ranging from being hundreds of miles apart to Gotham and Metropolis being twin cities on opposite sides of Delaware Bay, with Metropolis in Delaware and Gotham City being in New Jersey.

In Bronze Age stories that depicted Metropolis and Gotham City as twin cities, the Metro-Narrows Bridge was said to be the main route connecting Metropolis to Gotham City. Stated as being the longest suspension bridge in the world, the Metro-Narrows Bridge is likely based on the Verrazzano–Narrows Bridge, which stretches between Staten Island and Brooklyn in New York City.

In The World's Greatest Superheroes newspaper comic strip, a 1978 Sunday strip shows a map of the east coast of the United States; the map places Metropolis in Delaware and Gotham City across Delaware Bay in New Jersey, with the Metro-Narrows Bridge linking the two cities. A similar map appeared in The New Adventures of Superboy #22 (October 1981), with Smallville shown within driving distance of both cities (in post-Crisis comics, Smallville was officially relocated to Kansas). 1990's The Atlas of the DC Universe also places Metropolis in Delaware and Gotham City in New Jersey.

However, the exact location of the two cities has varied. A map of the United States in the Secret Files & Origins Guide to the DC Universe 2000 depicts Metropolis and Gotham City (alongside Blüdhaven) as being somewhere in New York's Tri-State area.

In the TV series Lois & Clark: The New Adventures of Superman, when Lois finds out about Superman's secret identity and yells at Clark about how he's been hiding his secretly being Superman, he responds, "A little louder, Lois. I don't think they could hear you in Gotham City." In the TV series Smallville, Linda Lake, a columnist for the Daily Planet, once boasted that she could see Gotham City from her new office. In Superman: The Animated Series, Bruce Wayne is shown taking his private jet aircraft to Metropolis, indicating that the two cities have at least some distance between them.

In the 2016 film Batman v Superman: Dawn of Justice, director Zack Snyder confirmed that Metropolis and Gotham City would be portrayed as geographically situated right next to each other, on the opposite sides of a bay, similar to Jersey City and Manhattan.

== History ==
A Native American tribe sold Metropolis Island to the first European settlers in 1644, similar to the history of New York City, in which Native Americans sold Manhattan Island to Dutch settlers in 1626.

== Features ==
Over the years, Metropolis' features have greatly changed in the comics; however, Metropolis is always presented as being a global city. It is often referred to as "The Big Apricot" just as New York City is nicknamed "The Big Apple". It is commonly portrayed as having an Art Deco style of architecture, much like New York City. The skyline and many of the notable landmarks in Metropolis are based on real-life landmarks in New York City. Frank Miller has said that "Metropolis is New York in the daytime; Gotham City is New York at night."

Metropolis' features became more defined and more obviously based on New York following both 1985's Crisis on Infinite Earths miniseries and John Byrne's subsequent revamping of Superman, including the late 1980s comic special The World of Metropolis.

According to Action Comics #143 (April 1950), the Statue of Liberty is said to stand in "Metropolis Harbor", while the real-life Statue of Liberty stands in New York Harbor. However, most stories indicate the Statue of Liberty is actually in New York City, which also exists in the DC Universe as a separate city from Metropolis.

The map of Metropolis designed for Mayfair Games' first edition of the DC Heroes Role-Playing Game resembled that of Manhattan.

=== Districts and boroughs ===
Metropolis is made up of six boroughs, the largest being New Troy. Each of the boroughs has its own distinct character and feel, which resemble and mimic New York City's boroughs.

==== New Troy ====
New Troy is the largest borough in Metropolis. Resembling Manhattan, New Troy is a skyscraper island bustling with commerce and business. The concrete and steel canyons of the city rise to dizzying heights. "1930s architecture stretched like a rubber band" as cited in the Art of Superman Returns book.

The Daily Planet Building is the most recognizable landmark in the Metropolis skyline, much like the Empire State Building for New York City. Located in "Planet Square", it is particularly known for the Daily Planet globe atop the building. Other prominent skyscrapers include the Emperor Building (a reference to the Empire State Building), the Newstime Building (home of the national Newstime magazine, a reference to and combination of Newsweek and Time) which is secretly owned for several years by Lord Satanus posing as "Colin Thornton", and the Twin Towered LexCorp Tower, (a reference to the former twin towers of the World Trade Center), headquarters for Lex Luthor's company.

Lex Luthor stands before the Superman and Superboy memorials in Centennial Park, based on New York's Central Park.

Besides the Financial District, notable areas of New Troy include:

- Chinatown – Metropolis' Asian District.
- Little Bohemia – The arts capital of Metropolis and a reference to Little Italy and Greenwich Village in Manhattan.
- Glenmorgan Square – An area that is based on Times Square.

Famous streets in New Troy include Fifth Avenue, Bessolo Boulevard, and Topaz Lane. The latter two are Metropolis' versions of Broadway in New York City. Bessolo Boulevard's name is derived from Adventures of Superman lead actor George Reeves' legal name before entering films. Other Metropolis boulevards in the New Troy borough are similarly named for other actors from that series and from its radio predecessor of the same name, such as Coates, Larson, and Collyer.

Centennial Park (sometimes labeled as Metropolis Park) is Metropolis' largest city park and is based on real life Central Park of New York City. Its most noteworthy feature is a statue of Superman with an American bald eagle erected after his apparent death fighting Doomsday. A statue of Superboy (Conner Kent) was built next to it after Conner's death during Infinite Crisis.

In 1990s and 2000s stories, the married Clark Kent and Lois Lane live in an apartment in New Troy, at 1938 Sullivan Lane, which is a tribute to the year Superman first appeared. The apartment was a wedding gift to the couple by Bruce Wayne, who owned the building. Clark Kent's traditional address of 344 Clinton Street, Apartment 3D, was usually described as being located in midtown Metropolis.

===== Suicide Slum =====
In northwestern New Troy is the impoverished and crime-infested neighborhood of Southside also known by its occupants as Suicide Slum, best known for the 1940s adventures of the Guardian and his street urchin companions the Newsboy Legion and in more contemporary times with Gangbuster. Although the northwestern location is similar to the relationship of Harlem to midtown Manhattan, the neighborhood bears more physical and cultural resemblance to Manhattan's Lower East Side. The Ace o' Clubs is a bar owned by Bibbo Bibbowski in Suicide Slum.

===== Other locations in New Troy =====
Other notable places and their NYC inspirations in New Troy include:

- Wireless City Movie Theater – A spoof of Radio City Music Hall.
- Metropolis International Airport – A spoof of LaGuardia Airport.
- Halldorf Hotel – A spoof of Waldorf Astoria.
- Lacey's Department Store – A spoof of Macy's.
- Stacey's Department Store – Another homage of Macy's.
- Spiffany's Jewelry Store – A spoof of Tiffany's.

==== Boroughs and suburbs ====
New Troy is separated from the suburban boroughs by the West River and Hobb's River, based on New York's East River and Hudson River, respectively.

===== Midvale =====
Midvale is a suburb of Metropolis, more well known as the home of Supergirl and the site of the Midvale Orphanage prior to the events of Crisis on Infinite Earths. It is located 60 miles northwest of Metropolis.

===== Bakerline =====
Bakerline is another borough of Metropolis. Located north of New Troy, Bakerline is the home of newspaper reporter Jimmy Olsen and appears to be based on The Bronx in New York City.

===== Other boroughs and suburbs =====
Other boroughs and suburban areas, almost all of which are based on real places in New York City, include Queensland Park (a reference to Queens), Hell's Gate (a reference to Hell Gate Bridge), St. Martin's Island (a reference to Staten Island), Park Ridge (a reference to Park Slope), Metrodale, and Highville.

== Cultural, educational, and research institutions ==
The exterior of the Superman Museum. From Superman #286, April 1975. Art by Curt Swan.

In the Silver Age and Bronze Age comics, a major Metropolis landmark is the Superman Museum. The Superman Museum features various exhibits dedicated to Metropolis' favorite superhero, similar to the Flash Museum in Central City. The Museum's exhibits were responsible for the origin of the Composite Superman. Members of the criminal organization the 100 at one point secretly used the Superman Museum as their base of operations, which was discovered by the superhero Black Lightning and his nemesis Tobias Whale. Superman, under the effects of hypnosis, once went on a rampage and wrecked several pieces at the museum. The Superman Museum, like the Flash Museum, is also usually shown as existing well into the Legion of Super-Heroes' era.

The central branch of S.T.A.R. Labs, a major scientific research institution, is also located in Metropolis.

The Metropolis Museum of Natural History was featured in the film Superman Returns.

=== Education ===
Metropolis University, Clark Kent's alma mater, is located in the city of Metropolis; Clark graduated with a degree in journalism. The college has a floating aquarium anchored just offshore called the "Ark".

=== Other landmarks, institutions and businesses ===
- Centennial Hotel - A hotel with views across Centennial Park.
- Centennial Park - Activities in the wooded acres include horseback riding, boating, and golfing.
- 1938 Sullivan - Owned by Wayne Enterprises, Lois Lane and Clark Kent's apartment building is one of the city's oldest buildings.
- University of Metropolis - Clark Kent's alma mater, this Ivy League institution boasts well-respected schools of journalism, law, and business.
- S.T.A.R. Labs - A scientific think-tank with branches across the United States, including Metropolis.
- Steelworks - John Henry Irons' foundry in the Old Hook Basin district of Suicide Slum includes a variety of advanced technology to aid Superman.
- Suicide Slum - A section of Metropolis known for its high levels of crime and poverty. Suicide Slum is the site of Ace O' Clubs, Bibbo Bibbowski's bar.
- Special Crimes Unit Precinct - Metropolis' S.C.U's upgraded headquarters houses offices, armories, and holding cells.
- Stryker's Island Penitentiary - A maximum security prison possesses high-tech detention facilities designed to accommodate metahuman villains. Located near New Troy's West River.
- Union Station - Location in the heart of the city, Union Station links the national railroad network to Metropolis' commuter grid.
- Metropolis City Hospital - A medical center that maintains a privileges-sharing program with S.T.A.R. Labs.
- Jules Verne Extra-Terrestrial Museum - The museum exhibits artifacts from alien worlds and presents guest lectures by interplanetary heroes.
- Lena Luthor Science Explorarium - An advanced interactive museum.
- City Hall - The administrative center of Metropolis.
- S.A.I. Dam - Hydroelectric waterworks control the flow of the twin rivers and the recycling of the city reservoir.
- Hypersector - The business and financial center of Metropolis.
- Hotel Metropolis - A five-star luxury hotel in the heart of Downtown.
- Shuster Hall - Metropolis' premier theater. It is named for Superman co-creator Joe Shuster.
- GBS Building - The corporate hub of Galaxy Communications' media conglomerate.
- Daily Planet Building - The home of the Daily Planet. The Daily Planet Building, with its distinctive hologram globe, is one of the city's most important landmarks.
- Metropolis Museum of Art - Galleries include important historical and contemporary artistic works.
- LexCorp Towers - Designed to form a double L, Lex Luthor's 307-story citadels are Metropolis tallest skyscraper.

== Industry ==
LexCorp, founded by Lex Luthor, is interested in all aspects of technology, communication, medical science, technical science, architectural engineering, future technology, and more.

Steelworks is the laboratory of John Henry Irons and in post-Crisis continuity, it came to rival LexCorp as its reach expanded into many different industries. John Henry renamed Steelworks Ironworks to further himself from his superhero life as Steel.

== Law and government ==
=== Mayors ===
At least four mayors are considered part of Metropolis' history:

- Mayor Frank Berkowitz - Mayor Frank Berkowitz began his term prior to Superman's first known public meeting with Lex Luthor as depicted in the Man of Steel #4 mini-series by John Byrne. Superman was given a choice: join Luthor and receive a generous check from him as first payment for his services, or arrest Luthor for the events in #4 as Berkowitz asked him to. Superman's decision made Lex Luthor his deadliest enemy to this day. Some years later, Frank Berkowitz was killed by a sniper hired by Lex Luthor.
  - Frank Berkowitz appeared in the Lois & Clark: The New Adventures of Superman episode "The Man of Steel Bars", portrayed by Sonny Bono.
- Mayor "Buck" Sackett - "Buck" Sackett was elected as Berkowitz's successor. He was covertly Lex Luthor's "puppet".
- Mayor Fleming - Mayor Fleming is an African-American female who has been introduced in Nick Spencer's Jimmy Olsen back-ups.
- Mayor Rob Morrisroe - Mayor Rob Morrisroe is the mayor of Metropolis in the first issue of Superman (vol. 3), as of DC's 2011 New 52 reboot.
- Mayor Perry White - In the "DC All In" publishing line, Perry White stepped down as editor of the Daily Planet and ran for mayor of Metropolis, ultimately winning the position of mayor.

=== Metropolis Police Department ===
The Metropolis Police Department headed by Commissioner David Corporon possesses a Special Crimes Unit dedicated to defending the city against superhuman menaces in case Superman is absent. The unit is headed by Maggie Sawyer and Dan Turpin, both of whom maintain frequent contact with the Man of Steel. Another of Superman's police contacts over the years has been Inspector William Henderson, who is currently the Metropolis police commissioner. The police unit is featured in a 1994–1995 limited series, Metropolis SCU. At some point during the missing year following Infinite Crisis, the division of the Metropolis Police Department dedicated to superhuman crime was renamed the Science Police.

Stryker's Island Penitentiary (based on New York's Riker's Island) is Metropolis' largest prison facility, as well as the name of the island on which it sits.

=== Metropolis Fire Department ===
Post-Crisis, Fireman Farrell is shown to be a member of the Metropolis fire department. In Batman & Superman: World's Finest #4 (July 1999), Farrell is a captain in the Metropolis FD.

== Media ==
Metropolis' premier newspaper is the Daily Planet, one of the most renowned news organizations in the DC Universe. The city is also home to the national Newstime magazine, where Clark Kent held the position of editor during the Eradicator story arc until he was fired by his superior, Collin Thornton, in The Adventures of Superman #465, for his increasingly strange behavior due to the Eradicator (including firing of some employees).

Other major media located in Metropolis include WGBS-TV, flagship station of the Galaxy Broadcasting System (GBS) television network, both subsidiaries of media conglomerate Galaxy Communications. Popular shows included The Midnight Show Starring Johnny Nevada (a fictional version of NBC's The Tonight Show, with Johnny Nevada being an analogue of Johnny Carson).

Between the early 1970s and mid-1980s, both Clark Kent and Lois Lane worked for WGBS after Galaxy Communications purchased the Daily Planet in a 1971 storyline, with Clark as the anchorman for the WGBS evening news. He was eventually joined by Lana Lang as a co-anchor. After John Byrne's revamp of Superman's origins, though, Clark and Lois were reverted to working at the Daily Planet once again. Galaxy Broadcasting and WGBS-TV still exist post-Crisis, however, and are usually used in any story where a television station or network is needed or shown. Post-Crisis, Clark, Lois and Lana never worked for the station. During the 1990s however, both Jimmy Olsen and Cat Grant did work there.

== People and culture ==
The people of Metropolis are depicted as a diverse group of large city-dwellers within the comics. They live in one of the world's largest, wealthiest, and most important cities.

=== Sports ===
As befitting any world city, Metropolis is represented by teams in all major-league sports. Like New York City, it is home to two teams in baseball and football. Of the two baseball teams, the Metropolis Monarchs are Clark Kent's favorite, while the other team, the Metropolis Meteors, is mentioned in 52 as having a rivalry with the St. Louis Cardinals.

In American football, Metropolis is home to the Metropolis Metros and the Metropolis Meteors. The latter football team (sharing the same name as the above baseball team) once featured Steve Lombard as its star quarterback. On the TV show Smallville, there is a football team called the Metropolis Sharks.

The city is also home to the Metropolis Generals basketball team, who play in Shuster Sports Arena, presumably named for Superman co-creator Joe Shuster.

Professional ice hockey is also present in Metropolis; its NHL team is the Metropolis Mammoths.

Several sports stadiums have been mentioned over the years. One such stadium is Metropolis Stadium, which was built in 1940. (Pre-Crisis, Metropolis Stadium had an Earth-Two counterpart, which was named "Sportsman's Stadium".) This was perhaps influenced by the real-life Sportsman's Park in St. Louis, for many years the shared home of baseball's St. Louis Cardinals and St. Louis Browns.

== Legion-Era Metropolis ==
Metropolis is traditionally depicted as continuing to survive, thrive and expand well into the 30th- and 31st-century timeframe of the Legion of Super-Heroes.

During the original incarnation of the series, Metropolis would be depicted as covering anything ranging from the entire Atlantic American coast to a more narrowed jurisdiction – according to one map officially published during Paul Levitz and Keith Giffen's initial partnership on the series, in Legion of Super-Heroes (vol. 2) #313 (July 1984) – covering most of Massachusetts, all of Rhode Island and Connecticut, New York State from Long Island's eastern tip up into the Catskills, and a large portion of northern New Jersey. In one imaginary Superman tale published in 1976 and partly set in then-futuristic 2001, "Metropolis" is the name of the new megalopolis of the Eastern seaboard corridor, comprising the cities of Washington, D.C., Philadelphia, New York and Boston and all the territory in between (Superman #300, June 1976).

Whatever version was used, it was generally viewed as given that the original city, as well as Gotham City, were considered within Legion-era Metropolis' boundaries, from the mid-1960s until the events of Zero Hour: Crisis in Time!.

The first post-Infinite Crisis version of the series as published in the "Threeboot" edition has described Metropolis as having expanded over the intervening millennium up the "entire Atlantic seaboard" of North America in one issue. In Final Crisis: Legion of 3 Worlds, it is revealed that this version of Metropolis belongs to Earth-Prime.

In Adventure Comics (vol. 2) #12, Metropolis during the Legion's first year is described by Brainiac 5 as having a population of "78 million sentient inhabitants in the urban zone before you reach the greenbelt".

== In other media ==
=== Television ===
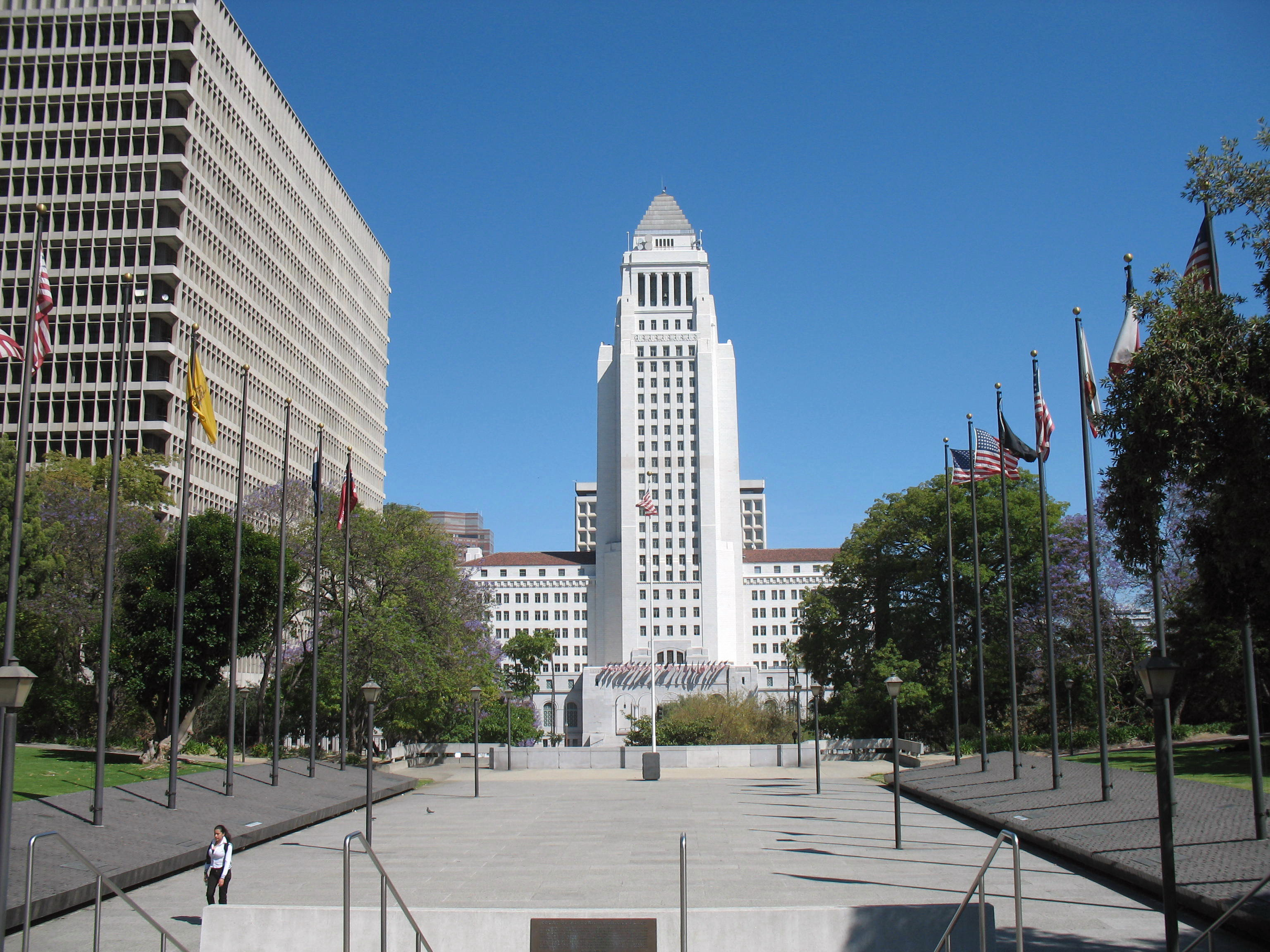
In the TV series Adventures of Superman, Los Angeles stood in place for Metropolis. The Los Angeles City Hall was depicted as the Daily Planet building in later seasons.

- Metropolis appears in Adventures of Superman.
- Metropolis appears in The New Adventures of Superman, as well as the 1980s Superman TV series.

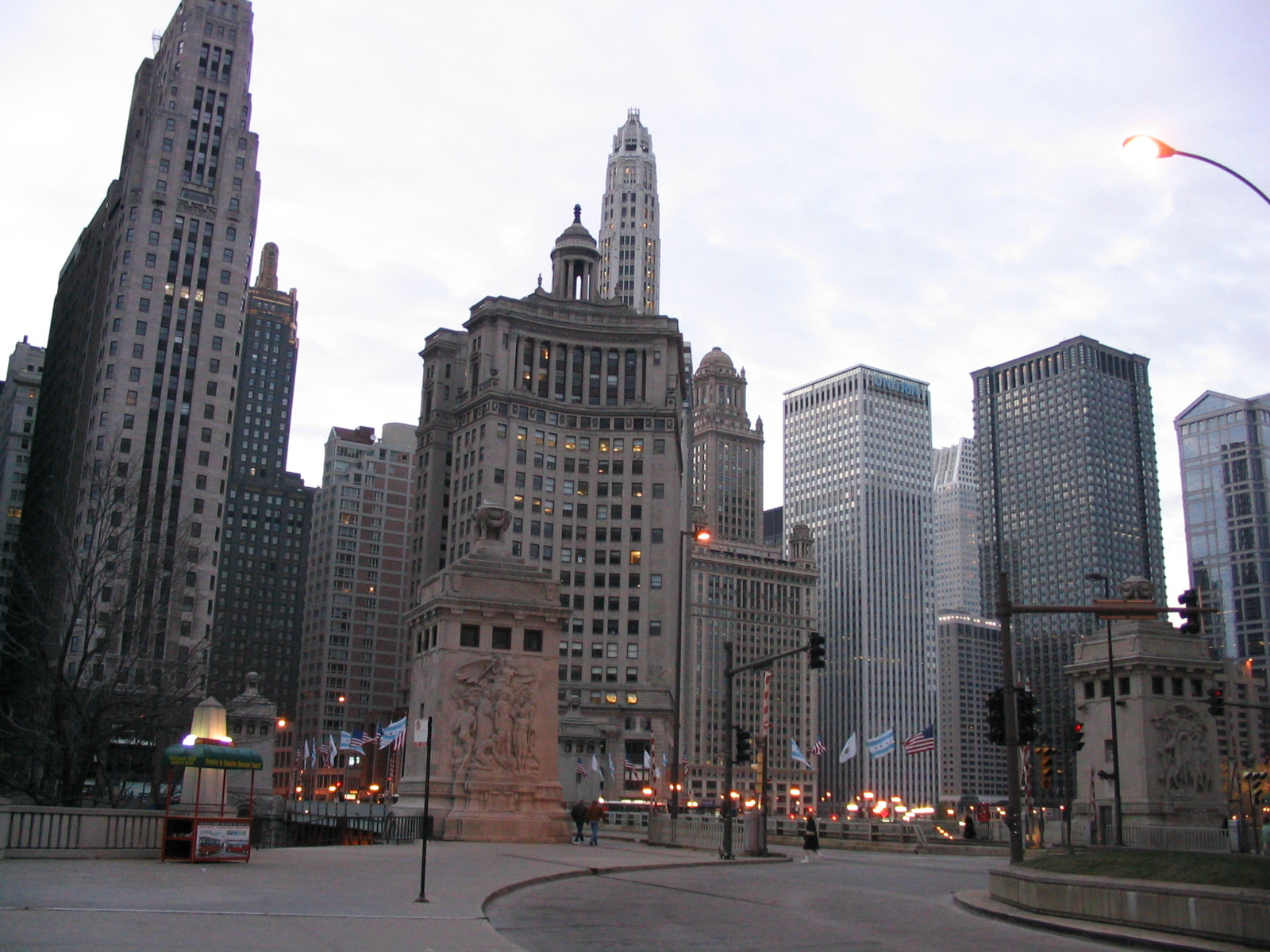
In the TV series Lois and Clark: The New Adventures of Superman, Chicago stood in place for Metropolis.

- Metropolis appears in Lois & Clark: The New Adventures of Superman. This version does not have a definitive location, although it has been implied to be in Illinois and Pennsylvania.
- Metropolis appears in series set in the DC Animated Universe (DCAU). This version is a coastal city with a retrofuturistic motif.

Metropolis Skyline, as seen in Smallville. The Daily Planet Building and LuthorCorp Tower are seen as the two tallest skyscrapers. On Smallville, Vancouver, British Columbia, Canada, stands in as Metropolis.

- Metropolis appears in Smallville. This version is located in western Kansas, near Dodge City. In filming the series, Vancouver and Surrey, British Columbia stand in for Metropolis. For example, the Marine Building in Vancouver stands in as the Daily Planet Building and the Central City Building in Surrey stands in as LuthorCorp.
- Metropolis appears in The Batman episode "The Batman/Superman Story".
- Metropolis appears in the animated series Legion of Super Heroes.
- Metropolis appears in Batman: The Brave and the Bold episode "Battle of the Superheroes!".
- In the animated TV series Young Justice, Metropolis is shown on a map at roughly the real-life location of New Haven, Connecticut.
- Metropolis appears in series set in the Arrowverse. This version is located in Pennsylvania, in close proximity to the Delaware and Maryland border and to Philadelphia.
- Gotham executive producers John Stephens and Danny Cannon announced in 2018 they were developing a TV series titled Metropolis, following Lois Lane and Lex Luthor as they investigate the city of Metropolis. The project was later cancelled in 2019.
- Metropolis is the main setting of the DC Super Hero Girls television series; the major characters are students at Metropolis High School.
- Metropolis appears in the television series Superman & Lois.
- Metropolis is the primary setting of the animated television series My Adventures with Superman. A map of the city in the first episode, "Adventures of a Normal Man", suggests Metropolis is located near San Francisco, California.
- Metropolis appears in the animated series Harley Quinn. The city is heavily focused in season 5 when Harley and Poison Ivy move to Metropolis.

=== Film ===
- In 1978's Superman and its sequels, Metropolis is shown as taking the place of New York City. The original film series made no attempt to hide this similarity, as prominent New York landmarks are seen throughout the films, including the Statue of Liberty, the World Trade Center, the Chrysler Building, Rockefeller Center, the United Nations Headquarters, the Empire State Building, the Brooklyn Bridge, Grand Central Terminal, and the New York Daily News offices. However, in Superman IV: The Quest for Peace, in the scene involving a runaway train in the Metropolis "Metro City Transit" subway system, an advertising poster on the subway station wall soliciting public donations for the then-ongoing Statue of Liberty restoration effort urges the donations be sent to "The Lady, P.O. Box 1986, New York 10018" - implying that Metropolis and New York are separate. In Superman III, some Calgary, Alberta landmarks can be seen, including the Calgary Tower and the St. Louis Hotel, as parts of the film were filmed there.

The Daily Planet Building at Planet Square with the Financial District, in 2006's Superman Returns

Another shot of Metropolis, which actually is Lower Manhattan with minor edits, like the removal of the modern 17 State Street and replaced with an older looking tower. The Daily Planet Building and others can be seen.

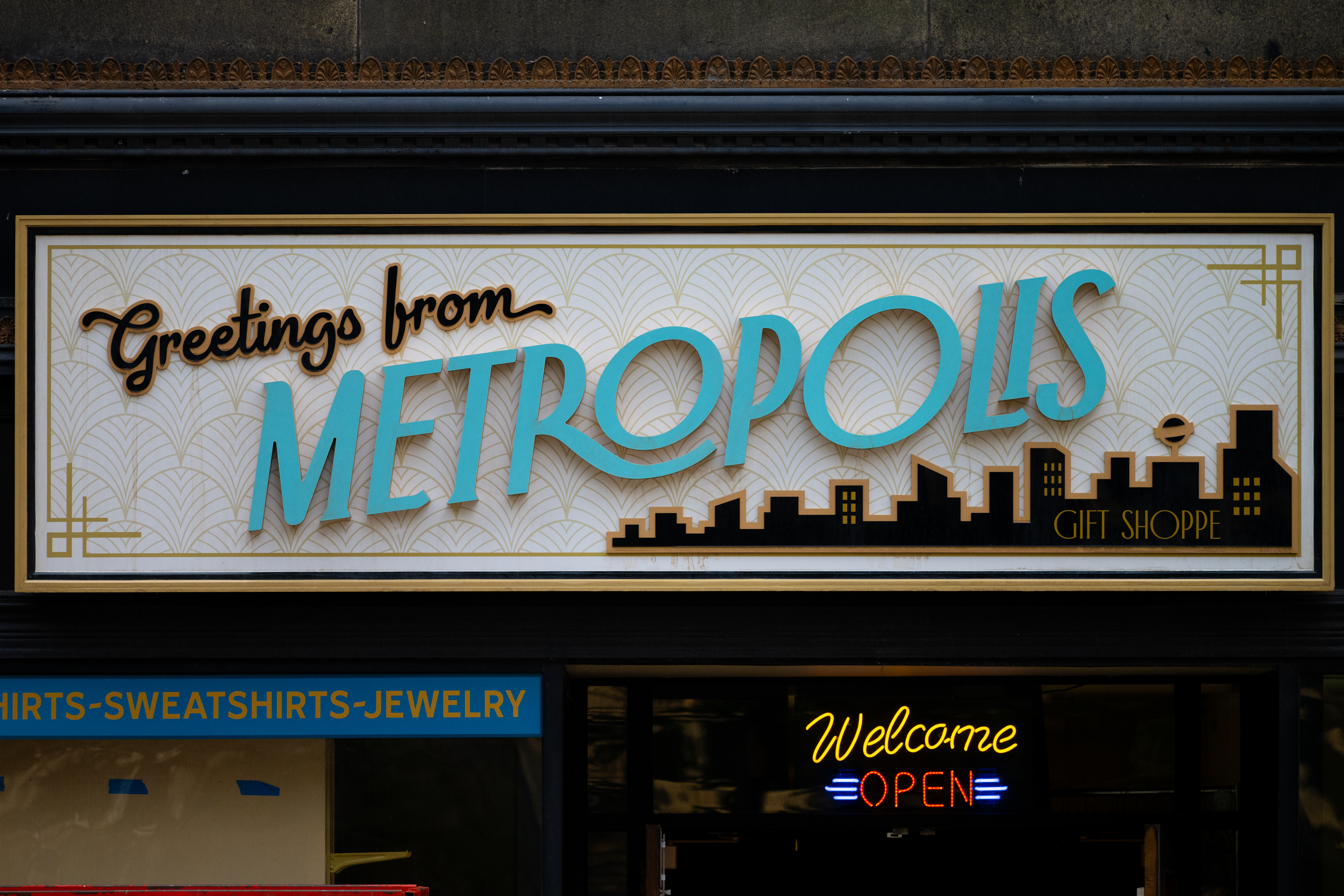
A welcome sign to Metropolis in the 2025 Superman film

- Superman Returns director Bryan Singer intended his version of Metropolis to be a stylistic cross between 1930s New York and current New York. The many shots of Superman flying high above the city establish that although Metropolis has a rectangular park reminiscent of Central Park, the city overall has a slightly different shape from New York City. Several New York City landmarks, such as the American International Building, Battery Park, the MetLife Building, the Woolworth Building, World Financial Center, 7 World Trade Center, and the Brooklyn Bridge, were clearly shown, as was the street grid of lower Manhattan, with a fictional bridge inserted north of Battery Park City and a fictional pier in the middle of Battery Park. The map of Metropolis shown in this article, however, tries to make the city's form as different as possible from New York City's, given the scenery shown. Photographs of some automobiles used in filming show license plates bearing the phrase "New York State" along the bottom, although the featured vehicles (including Lois Lane's car) are shown in the film to have license plates reading "The First State" Lex Luthor's map onscreen portrays the city as directly in the location of New York City. Senior production designer Guy Dyas said in The Art of Superman Returns (Chronicle Books, 2006): "We wiped out, I think, half of New Jersey to put in Metropolis." The map showed Metropolis clearly being in place for New York City but in New York State. Long Island was not shown. Midtown Manhattan was only shown twice, both in brief high aerial shots of the city at night. The first had the Empire State Building and Chrysler Building obstructed by clouds while the GE Building was visible. The second, all three buildings would appear but very briefly. License Plates show the Daily Planet Building as the main symbol for Metropolis. With no World Trade Center due to the September 11, 2001 attacks (which took place during Superman's five-year departure from Earth), the real life Empire State Building, or in this case the Emperor Building as named in the comics, would be the tallest in Metropolis. In past Superman films, Metropolis was suggested to be New York City itself. Landmarks like the World Trade Center and Statue of Liberty were seen on film. In Superman Returns, Metropolis is New York City with minor changes. The film focused primarily on Lower Manhattan with Midtown Manhattan only shown twice in the distance. 17 State Street, which is a recognizable glass tower at the tip of the island was replaced by an older looking tower and the tops of the two World Financial Center Towers were removed. A small cluster of tall Art-Deco Towers along with the Daily Planet building were added to the skyline near the Civic Center. The LexCorp Tower never appeared in the film; comics suggest LexCorp had a Twin Towered Headquarters, which suggests that if they still existed, the World Trade Center North and South towers were the LexCorp Towers, but being 2006, unlike the older Superman films, the World Trade Center's Twin Towers, did not appear, being that the setting is after the September 11, 2001 attacks. It is implied that 9/11 happened shortly after Superman's five-year departure from Earth, as in 2006, five years ago it was 2001 where the world was in no major wars until the events of 9/11. Despite this, one aerial shot showed several small buildings over the site, probably suggesting that they never existed, yet a quick scene showed footage of the war on terror on television news. Parts of Superman Returns was filmed in Sydney, Australia, and some minor landmarks in Sydney can be identified such as Martin Place, when Superman catches the car. License plates on cars that state the first state may also refer to NSW license plates.

Metropolis as seen in the DC Extended Universe. In this image, portions of Millennium Park in Chicago were used to model the fictional city.

- Metropolis appears extensively the DC Extended Universe, first appearing in Man of Steel (2013) and later Batman v Superman: Dawn of Justice (2016) and Justice League (2017). Areas of Vancouver, downtown Chicago and Detroit have been used as filming locations for the city, with several fictional buildings being added. Much of Metropolis is destroyed during the fight between Superman and General Zod in the first film's climax. It also appears to be a federal district similar to Washington, DC, with a ZIP code of 33866. Director Zack Snyder confirmed that Metropolis and Gotham City are portrayed as being in close geographical proximity to each other but are separated by Delaware Bay. In Justice League it is revealed there is a tunnel connecting the two, constructed as part of the abandoned 'Metropolis Project' in 1929 to connect the two cities. There are multiple islands located in the bay also, with one of them being named Braxton Island. During Super Bowl 50, an advertisement for Turkish Airlines showcased a rebuilt Metropolis, with Lex Luthor declaring the city open for business again. A "Gotham City" version of the ad, starring Bruce Wayne and sharing an identical theme, also aired during the game.
- Metropolis also appears in most of the DC Comics animated films in which Superman makes an appearance, namely Superman: Brainiac Attacks, Superman: Doomsday, Superman/Batman: Public Enemies, Superman/Batman: Apocalypse, All-Star Superman, Justice League: Crisis on Two Earths, Justice League: Doom, Superman vs The Elite, Superman: Unbound, and DC League of Super-Pets. It additionally appears in the live action/animated hybrid film Space Jam: A New Legacy.
- Metropolis appears extensively the DC Universe (DCU), first appearing in the film Superman (2025), later Supergirl (2026) and will appear in the film Man of Tomorrow (2027). This version was filmed mainly in the Ohio cities of Cleveland and Cincinnati, but is strongly implied to be in Delaware due to various buildings flying Delaware state flags, as well as Lois Lane's car having a Delaware license plate.

=== Video games ===
Metropolis appears in several video games, including Superman, Superman: Shadow of Apokolips, Superman: The Man of Steel, Superman Returns, Mortal Kombat vs. DC Universe, where it is shown partially in ruins following the Justice League's fight with Darkseid, and it appears in DC Universe Online.

Metropolis appears in the game Injustice: Gods Among Us, in two different forms- a Prime Earth version, in which the Joker attempts and fails to destroy the city with an atomic bomb, and an alternate universe Earth version, which occurs as a result of the Joker succeeding in his plot, which also killed Lois Lane and Superman's unborn son. The alternate universe, or "Regime" Metropolis is used as a playable fighting stage. Here, it has been rebuilt into a more dystopian city, which is where the "prime" Batman and Joker end up when they are accidentally transported there. The Prime Earth version, however, is not a playable stage in the game, and is only shown as a cameo in the game's story mode. One notable feature in each version of Metropolis is a statue depicting Superman with a globe. In the Prime universe, the statue depicts Superman standing below the globe, carrying it above his head, symbolizing that he follows the world's rules. On the other hand, in the Regime universe, the statue depicts Superman standing above the globe with his arms folded, symbolizing that the world follows his rules, as he has become a tyrant following the destruction of the original Metropolis and the deaths of Lois Lane and their unborn son. Metropolis is the only stage in the game to have three sections: the city streets, the top of the Daily Planet, and a museum featuring past superhero costumes and weapons.

Metropolis appears in Lego Dimensions, where it is taken over by Sauron from The Lord of the Rings franchise, With Superman being sucked into an alternate dimension, Batman, Gandalf, and Wyldstyle oppose Sauron.

Metropolis appears as a playable stage in Injustice 2. The two sections consist of Memorial Station (which contains statues of Superman and his downfall and Lex Luthor's opposition) and the Ace O' Clubs bar. In the story mode, Metropolis is one of the cities Superman fails to restore on Brainiac's ship.

In Lego DC Super-Villains, part of the open world is Metropolis. LexCorp Tower, the Daily Planet, and S.T.A.R. Labs are featured.

An open-world Metropolis is the main setting of Suicide Squad: Kill the Justice League, with Brainiac taking over the Justice League through mind control and having them capture and destroy the city, so he can rebuild it new.

=== Theme parks ===
Metropolis appears in the Justice League: Alien Invasion 3D dark ride designed and created by Sally Corporation for Warner Bros. Movie World in Gold Coast, Australia. The city also appears in the Justice League: Battle for Metropolis dark ride created by Sally Corporation and is located at several Six Flags theme parks. A section of Warner Bros. World Abu Dhabi is themed after Metropolis, with major landmarks serving as entrances to attractions such as the Daily Planet for a Superman attraction, the Hall of Justice for a Justice League ride, and the Metropolis Observatory for a Green Lantern attraction. Patrons can also eat at a restaurant themed after Big Belly Burger.

== Metropolis, Illinois ==
The real town of Metropolis, Illinois, has been proclaimed the "hometown of Superman" by the Illinois State Legislature, and the town celebrates its "local hero". Among the ways it celebrates the character include a large Superman statue in the city, a Superman museum, an annual Superman festival, and its local newspaper The Metropolis Planet, a name inspired by the major newspaper in fictional Metropolis, the Daily Planet. A version of the town has appeared in the comics itself, as a city whose citizens idolize the hero who lives in their 'sister' city.
