= Collin Wilcox (actress) =

American actress (1935–2009)

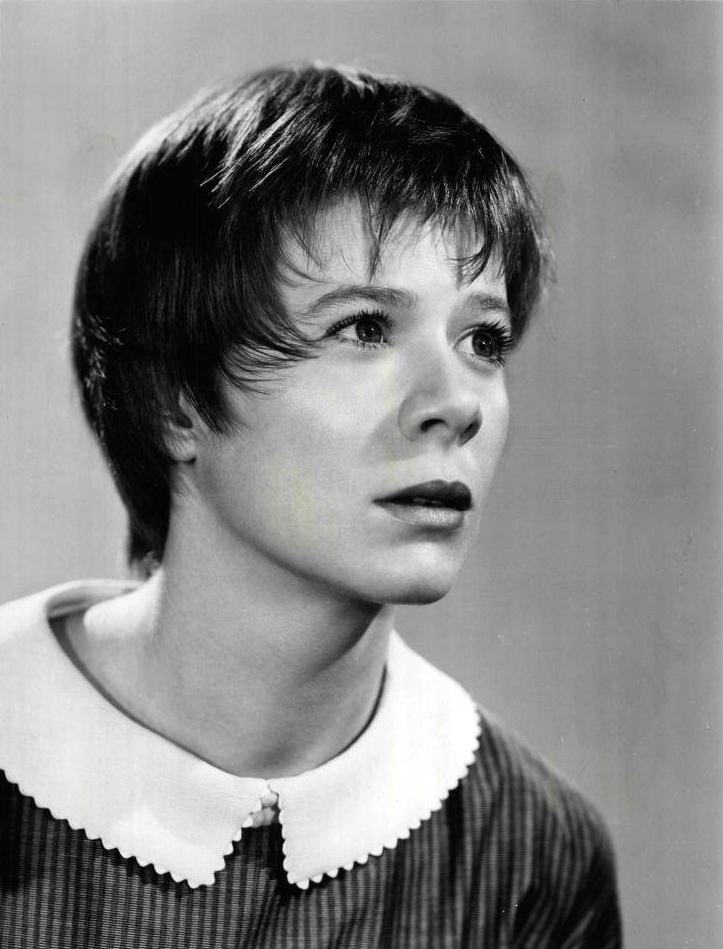
- Wilcox in 1958
- Born: Collin Randall Wilcox; February 4, 1935; Cincinnati, Ohio, U.S.
- Died: October 14, 2009 (aged 74); Highlands, North Carolina, U.S.
- Occupation: Actress
- Years active: 1953–2003
- Spouses: Walter Beakel (m. 1957, divorced) Geoffrey Horne (m. 1963; div. 1977) Scott Paxton (m. 1979)
- Children: 3

Collin Randall Wilcox (February 4, 1935 – October 14, 2009) was an American film, stage and television actress. Over her career, she was also credited as Collin Wilcox-Horne or Collin Wilcox-Paxton. Wilcox may be best known for her role in To Kill a Mockingbird (1962), in which she played Mayella Violet Ewell, whose father falsely claimed she had been raped by a black man, which sparks the trial at the center of the film.

== Early years ==
Wilcox was born in Cincinnati, Ohio, and moved with her family to Highlands, North Carolina, as a baby. Her interest in theater was sparked by her parents, Jack H. and Virginia Wilcox, who founded the Highlands Community Theater (now known as the Highlands Playhouse) in 1939.

She attended the University of Tennessee, where she studied drama.

== Career ==
Wilcox made her professional debut in Chicago as part of the improvisational group, The Compass Players, which included Mike Nichols, Elaine May, and Shelley Berman.

Playing opposite Richard Basehart, Kevin McCarthy, and William Hansen, Wilcox won the Clarence Derwent Award for her performance in The Day The Money Stopped by Maxwell Anderson and Brendan Gill, which lasted only three nights on Broadway in 1958. She starred in the 1961 play Look, We've Come Through with Burt Reynolds on Broadway. She replaced Jane Fonda as Madeline Arnold in the 1963 revival of Eugene O'Neill's Strange Interlude and then went on to do the 1965 play The Family Way, both on Broadway.

A life member of The Actors Studio, Wilcox is perhaps best known for her role in the 1962 film To Kill a Mockingbird, in which she played Mayella Violet Ewell, who falsely accuses Tom Robinson (Brock Peters) of raping her. Following that cinematic acting success, she performed two very memorable roles for television in 1964: The Twilight Zone episode "Number 12 Looks Just Like You" and The Alfred Hitchcock Hour episode "The Jar", based on the Ray Bradbury short story.

She appeared as Bess Frye in a 1972 episode of Gunsmoke titled "Jubilee". In 1974, she co-starred with Peter Falk and Robert Conrad in the Columbo episode "An Exercise in Fatality" as Ruth Stafford. She remained active, performing both on television and in films. Her final role was that of Mrs. Kline in the movie A Touch of Fate, which was released in 2003, six years before her death.

== Civil rights activism ==
She recalled receiving "unfriendly looks" when she showed up at an NAACP conference in Monterey, California, because in the film To Kill a Mockingbird, she played a white woman who falsely accused Tom Robinson, a black man, of raping her. An official had to remind participants: "Collin is here at this conference because she believes in the cause. She is not the character in the film."

== Death ==
On October 14, 2009, Wilcox died from brain cancer, aged 74, at her home in Highlands, North Carolina. She was cremated and her ashes returned to her family.

== Filmography ==
- Twice Upon a Time (1953) - Ian
- To Kill a Mockingbird (1962) - Mayella Violet Ewell
- The Name of the Game Is Kill! (1968) - Diz Terry
- The Sound of Anger (1968, TV Movie) - Ann Kochek
- Catch-22 (1970) - Nurse Cramer
- The Revolutionary (1970) - Ann
- The Baby Maker (1970) - Suzanne
- Jump (1971) - April Mae
- The Man Who Could Talk to Kids (1973, TV Movie) - Honor Lassiter
- The Autobiography of Miss Jane Pittman (1974, TV Movie) - Mistress Bryant
- A Cry in the Wilderness (1974, TV Movie) - Bess Millard
- The Lives of Jenny Dolan (1975, TV Movie) - Mrs. Owens
- September 30, 1955 (1977) - Jimmy J.'s Mother
- Jaws 2 (1978) - Dr. Elkins
- Under This Sky (1979, TV Movie) - Susan B. Anthony
- Marie (1985) - Virginia
- Foxfire (1987, TV Movie) - Madge Burton
- Wildflower (1991, TV Movie) - Bessie Morgan
- The Portrait (1993, TV Movie) - Chancellor
- Fluke (1995) - Bella
- The Journey of August King (1996) - Mina
- Twisted Desire (1996, TV Movie) - Rose Stanton
- Midnight in the Garden of Good and Evil (1997) - Woman at Party
- A Touch of Fate (2003) - Mrs. Kline (final film role)

== Selected television appearances ==
- The Untouchables
  - (Season 3 Episode 17: "Takeover") (March 3, 1962) as Ann Gratzner
  - (Season 3 Episode 26: "Pressure") (1962) as Francie Pavanos
- Route 66 (January 1964) (Season 4 Episode 14: "Is it True There Are Poxies at the Bottom of Landfair Lake?") as Diana
- The Twilight Zone (1964) (Season 5 Episode 17: "Number 12 Looks Just Like You") as Marilyn Cuberle
- Alfred Hitchcock Presents (1959) (Season 5 Episode 4: "Coyote Moon") as Julie (episode aired originally on October 18)
- The Alfred Hitchcock Hour (1964-1965)
  - (Season 2 Episode 17: "The Jar") (episode originally aired February 14, 1964) as Thedy Sue Hill
  - (Season 3 Episode 26: "The Monkey's Paw: A Retelling") (episode aired originally on April 19, 1965) as Selina
- Perry Mason (1964) (Season 8 Episode 1: "The Case of the Missing Button")
- The Fugitive (1965-1966)
  - (Season 3 Episode 13: "The Good Guys and the Bad Guys") (December 14, 1965) as Laura McElvey
  - (Season 4 Episode 9: "Approach with Care") (November 15, 1966) as Mary Turner
- The F.B.I. (1966-1967)
  - (Season 1 Episode 22: "The Baby Sitter") (1966) as Stella
  - (Season 2 Episode 16: "Passage into Fear") (January 8, 1967) as Hanna
- The Virginian (December 6, 1967) (Season 6 Episode 12: "The Barren Ground") as Sarah Keogh
- Death Valley Days (October 1, 1968) (Season 17 Episode 4: "The Sage Hen") as Sage Madison
- The Immortal (October 22, 1970) (Season 1 Episode 5: "The Rainbow Butcher") as Clarice Evans
- Medical Center (October 27, 1971) (Season 3 Episode 7: "The Shattered Man") as Claudia Welsley
- The Waltons (October 26, 1972) (Season 1, Episode 7: "The Sinner") as Reverend Ethel Prissom
- The Streets of San Francisco (September 20, 1973) (Season 2 Episode 2: "Betrayed") as Katherine 'Kate' Evans
- Columbo (September 15, 1974) (Season 4 Episode 1: "An Exercise in Fatality") as Ruth Stafford
- Little House on the Prairie (October 31, 1977) (Season 4 Episode 7: "To Run and Hide") as Beth Novak
