= The Baby Maker =

1970 film

- Theatrical release poster
- Directed by: James Bridges
- Written by: James Bridges
- Produced by: Richard Goldstone; Jack Larson
- Starring: Barbara Hershey; Scott Glenn; Collin Wilcox-Horne; Sam Groom
- Cinematography: Charles Rosher Jr.
- Edited by: Walter Thompson
- Music by: Fred Karlin
- Production company: Robert Wise Productions
- Distributed by: National General Pictures
- Release date: October 1, 1970
- Running time: 109 minutes
- Country: United States
- Language: English

The Baby Maker is a 1970 American drama film that was directed and co-written by James Bridges and released by National General Pictures.

== Plot ==
Tish Gray is a flower child who is hired to have the baby of a middle-class couple, Suzanne and Jay Wilcox. The film exposes the clash of values between Tish, her boyfriend Tad Jacks, and the couple. It also deals with the emotional turmoil all four characters go through.

== Cast ==
- Barbara Hershey as Tish Gray
- Collin Wilcox Paxton as Suzanne Wilcox (credited as Collin Wilcox-Horne)
- Sam Groom as Jay Wilcox
- Scott Glenn as Tad Jacks
- Jeannie Berlin as Charlotte
- Lili Valenty as Mrs. Culnick
- Helena Kallianiotes as Wanda
- Jeff Siggins as Dexter
- Phyllis Coates as Tish's Mother
- Madge Kennedy as Tish's Grandmother
- Ray Hemphill as The Toy Store 'Killer'
- Paul Linke as Sam
- Bobby Pickett as Dr. Sims
- Samuel Francis as The Single Wing Turquoise Bird
- Alan Keesling as The Single Wing Turquoise Bird (2)

== Release ==
The film had its premiere on October 1, 1970 at the Plaza and New Embassy Theatres in New York.

== Reception ==
Criticizing the directing and writing of James Bridges, critic Shirley Rigby said of the "bizarre" film, "Only the performances in the film save it from being a total travesty." Rigby went on to say, "Barbara Hershey is a great little actress, much, much more than just another pretty face." John Simon called The Baby Maker "insufferable". The film received an Academy Award nomination at the 43rd Academy Awards for Best Original Song Score.

== Home media ==
The Baby Maker was released to DVD by Warner Home Video on March 23, 2009, via the Warner Archives DVD-on-demand service as a Region 1 DVD.

== See also ==
- List of American films of 1970
- Immediate Family
- Juno
- Surrogacy
