= George Taylor (DC Comics) =

- George Taylor in Action Comics (vol. 2) #8 (April 2012). Art by Rags Morales (penciller and co-colorist) Rick Bryant (inker) and Brad Anderson (co-colorist)

Publication information
- Publisher: DC Comics
- First appearance: Action Comics #1 (June 1938)
- Created by: Jerry Siegel; Joe Shuster

In-story information
- Species: Human
- Team affiliations: Daily Star; Daily Planet
- Supporting character of: Superman; Clark Kent; Lois Lane

George Taylor is a fictional character appearing in Superman comic books published by DC Comics. He is the editor-in-chief of the Metropolis newspaper the Daily Star. An early Superman supporting character, he was created by Jerry Siegel and Joe Shuster as the unnamed editor who gave Clark Kent his first job as a reporter in Action Comics #1 (June 1938). His name was later revealed in Superman #2 (1939). Perry White replaced him as the Editor-in-Chief of the Daily Planet in Superman #7 (October 1940). In the New 52 the character is once again running the Daily Star.

== Fictional character biography ==
=== Golden Age ===
Virtually nothing is known about the background of this version of the character, but his personality as a newspaper editor was well defined. He was irascible, yelling at his reporters when angry or excited, but he was also a model of courage, loyalty, and integrity. When the superintendent of a labor camp claimed that reports about him in the Daily Star were libelous, Taylor would not apologize, saying that the information they had obtained was authoritative, and he dared the superintendent to sue. He also defended the reporter's pledge not to reveal the source of information.

Taylor at first refused to hire the inexperienced Clark Kent as a reporter, but later changed his mind when Kent brought in the story of an attempted lynching. He shortly made it Kent's steady assignment to cover the reports about Superman. However, when Lois Lane, the Star's "lonelyhearts" column writer, claimed the next day to have met Superman, Taylor did not believe her, asking if she had actually seen pink elephants. This was indicative of the difference in Taylor's attitude toward Kent and Lane: he was supportive of Clark, giving him a variety of assignments including South American war correspondent, but if Lois asked for an important story she was told by her editor that it was "no job for a girl!" To be fair, Kent received his share of abuse, as when Taylor called him a "brainless idiot" and fired him for flubbing an assignment. But the editor gave Clark his job back when he brought in the story, and he softened toward Lois over time. Taylor also admitted it when he was wrong, as he did when he accused Kent of betraying his confidential source for cowardly reasons.

In the spring of 1940, the newspaper Taylor edited inexplicably changed its name to the Daily Planet. He retained his position until November, after which time a new editor, Perry White, was introduced.

==== Earth-Two ====
When DC Comics created the multiverse, the Superman of Earth-Two was assigned all the characteristics and baggage of the early Golden Age version of the character, and this included the Daily Star and George Taylor, who was still editor when Clark Kent and Lois Lane got married. Upon announcing his retirement in the early 1950s, Taylor chose his successor by way of a competition between Kent and senior reporter Perry White. By solving a famous missing-person case, White proved the superior reporter, but lost the editor's job to Kent because Taylor felt that the better reporter should not be locked to a desk. Sometime after retiring, Taylor discovered a filmstrip depicting Kent changing to Superman, but he promised Clark that he would not reveal his secret identity. However, corrupt reporter Rod Pilgrim overheard the conversation and murdered Taylor to acquire the filmstrip. Superman confronted Pilgrim, convinced him that the images were part of a gag film, and turned the killer over to police.

=== Earth-One ===
In Superman #366 (December 1981), George Taylor was shown to be the editor of the Daily Planet on Earth-One before Perry White. Taylor, who had succeeded a man named Morton, chose White to replace him when he retired at age sixty-five, an event that coincided with Clark Kent's junior year at Metropolis University. George Taylor's son George Taylor Jr. became editor of the Daily Star in Star City and continuously tried to prove that Oliver Queen was the masked hero Green Arrow. George Taylor's grandson George Taylor III was a record-breaking pole vaulter.

=== Post-Crisis ===
After the Crisis on Infinite Earths wiped out the multiverse and replaced it with one Earth, the Metropolis Daily Star with George Taylor as editor was a rival paper to the Daily Planet, which was edited by Perry White. Taylor was still in his position as late as 2002. When Superman was cast into a Golden-Age reality during the "Dominus Effect" storyline of 1998, the original Taylor briefly reappeared.

=== The New 52 ===
In 2011, "The New 52" rebooted the DC universe. George Taylor was reintroduced in Action Comics (vol. 2) #8 as the publisher of the Daily Star.

== In other media ==
=== Television ===
- George Taylor appears in the Adventures of Superman episode "The Evil Three". This version is a hotel manager who is murdered by his nephew, who sought to gain his fortune.
- George Taylor appears in the Smallville episode "Delete", portrayed by Jim Thorburn. This version is a Daily Planet editor who is killed by his assistant, who had been brainwashed by Molly Griggs.
- George Taylor makes a cameo appearance in the My Adventures with Superman episode "Most Eligible Superman", voiced by an uncredited actor. This version is a reporter for the Metropolis Star.

=== Film ===
George Taylor appears in Superman: Red Son, voiced by Jim Ward.
