= Montgomery Clift =

American actor (1920–1966)

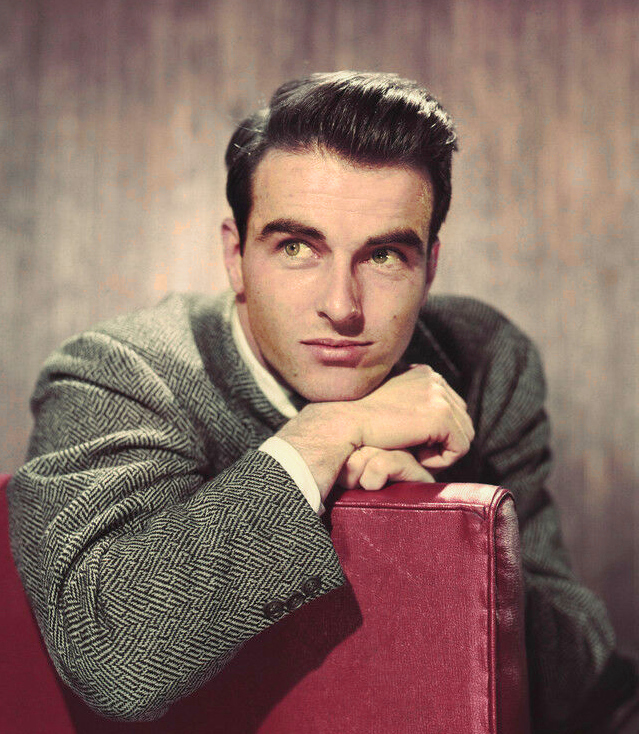
- Studio publicity photograph, c. 1948
- Born: Edward Montgomery Clift; October 17, 1920; Omaha, Nebraska, U.S.
- Died: July 23, 1966 (aged 45); New York City, U.S.
- Other name: Monty Clift
- Occupation: Actor
- Years active: 1934–1966

Edward Montgomery Clift (October 17, 1920 – July 23, 1966) was an American actor. A four-time Academy Award nominee, he was known for his portrayal of "moody, sensitive young men", according to The New York Times.

He is best remembered for his roles in Howard Hawks's Red River (1948), George Stevens's A Place in the Sun (1951), Fred Zinnemann's From Here to Eternity (1953), Stanley Kramer's Judgment at Nuremberg (1961), and John Huston's The Misfits (1961).

Along with Marlon Brando and James Dean, Clift was considered one of the original method actors in Hollywood (though Clift distanced himself from the term); he was one of the first actors to be invited to study in the Actors Studio with Lee Strasberg and Elia Kazan. Clift's decision to sign a contract only after his first two films were a success created "a power differential that would go on to structure the star–studio relationship for the next 40 years".

== Early life ==
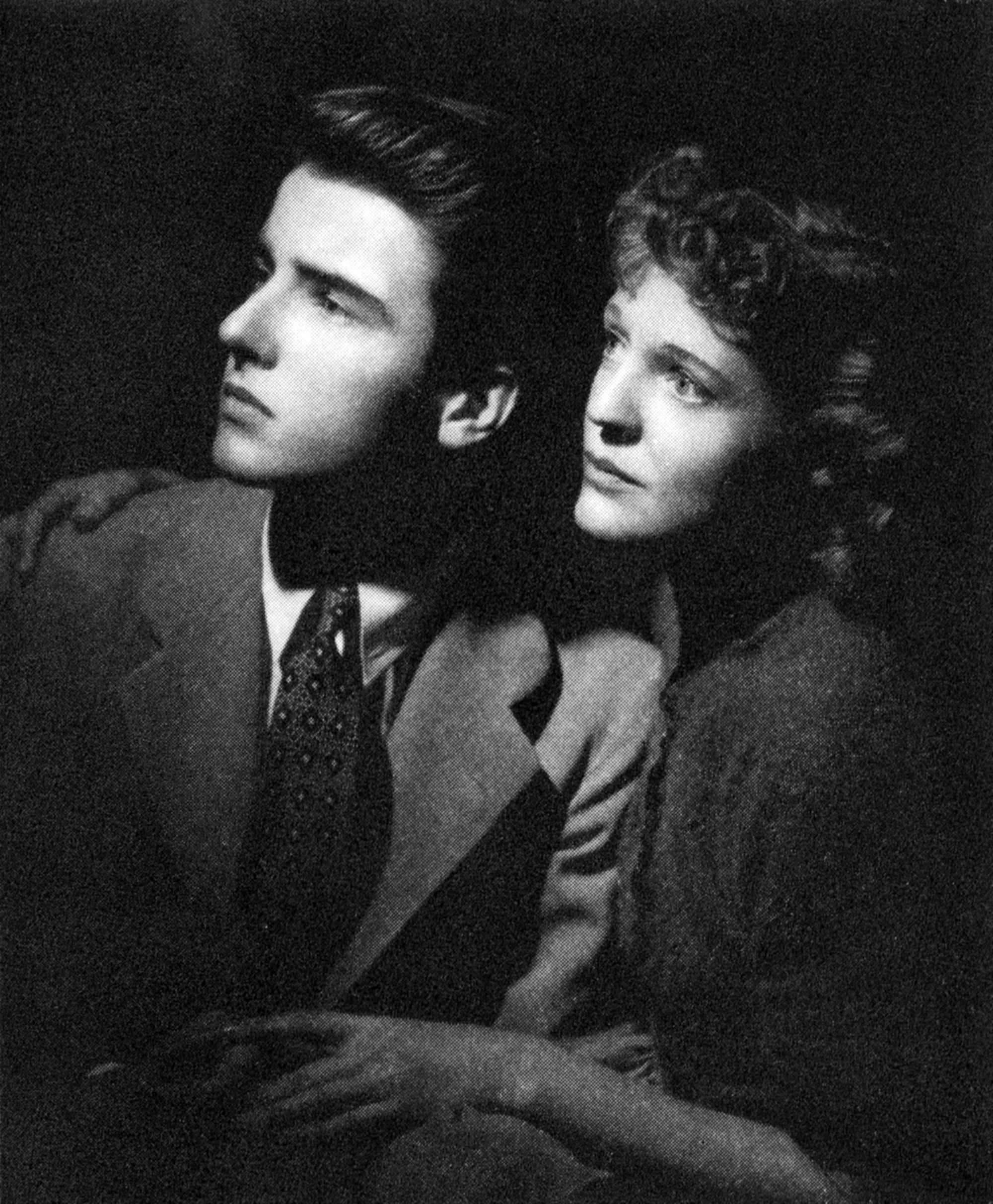
Clift and Lois Hall in the Broadway production of Patricia Collinge's Dame Nature (1938)

Edward Montgomery Clift was born on October 17, 1920, in Omaha, Nebraska, into a wealthy family. His father, William Brooks "Bill" Clift (1886–1964), was the vice-president of Omaha National Trust Company. His mother was Ethel Fogg "Sunny" Clift (née Anderson; 1888–1988). His parents were Quakers and met as students at Cornell University, marrying in 1914. Clift had a twin sister, Roberta (who later went by "Ethel"), who survived him by 48 years, and an older brother, William Brooks Clift, Jr. (1919–1986), known as "Brooks", who had a son with actress Kim Stanley and was later married to political reporter Eleanor Clift. Clift had English and Scots Irish ancestry on his father's side, wealthy relatives who hailed from Chattanooga, Tennessee. His mother, Sunny, was adopted; she maintained that Clift's true maternal great-grandfathers were the US postmaster-general Montgomery Blair and Union commander Robert Anderson, a part of her lineage that was clarified to her (when she came of age) by Dr. Edward Montgomery, the family doctor who delivered her. She spent the rest of her life trying to gain the recognition of her alleged relations.

Part of Clift's mother's effort was her determination that her children should be brought up in the style of aristocrats. Thus, as long as Clift's father was able to pay for it, he and his siblings were privately tutored, travelled extensively in America and Europe, became fluent in German and French, and led a protected life, sheltered from the destitution and communicable diseases that became legion following the First World War. At age 7, while aboard a European ship, a boy forced Clift's head underwater in the swimming pool for so long that a gland in his neck burst from his struggle to breathe; he had a long scar from the resulting infection and operation. The Wall Street crash of 1929 and the Great Depression of the 1930s ruined Clift's father financially; Bill was forced to downsize and move to Chicago to take a new job while Sunny continued traveling with the children. In a 1957 issue of McCall's magazine, Clift quipped, "My childhood was hobgoblin, my parents traveled a lot...That's all I can remember."

=== Early theater career: 1934–1946 ===
Clift had shown an interest in acting and theatrics as a child living in Switzerland and France but did not take the initiative to go out for a part in a local production until age 13, when his family was forced to downsize and relocate from Chicago to Sarasota, Florida. He had a small non-paying role.

Close to a year later the family moved again, settling in New York City. Clift debuted on Broadway at age 14 as Harmer Masters in the comedy Fly Away Home, which ran from January to July 1935 at the 48th Street Theatre. The New York World-Telegram noticed Clift's "amazing poise and dexterity" while producer Theo Bamberger commended him for what he called a "natural histrionic instinct."

Clift spent a short time at the Dalton School in Manhattan but struggled with traditional schooling. He continued to flourish onstage and appeared in works by Moss Hart and Cole Porter, Robert Sherwood, Lillian Hellman, Tennessee Williams, and Thornton Wilder, creating the part of Henry in the original production of The Skin of Our Teeth.

Clift proved to be a successful young stage actor working with, among others, Dame May Whitty, Alla Nazimova, Mary Boland, Cornelia Otis Skinner, Fredric March, Tallulah Bankhead, Alfred Lunt, and Lynn Fontanne. In 1939, as a member of the cast of the 1939 Broadway production of Noël Coward's Hay Fever, Clift participated in one of the first television broadcasts in the United States. The Hay Fever performance was broadcast by NBC's New York television station W2XBS (the forerunner of WNBC) and was aired during the 1939 New York World's Fair. At age 20, he appeared in the Broadway production of There Shall Be No Night, a work that won the 1941 Pulitzer Prize for Drama.

Clift also participated in radio broadcasts early in his career, though, according to one critic, he hated the medium. On May 24, 1944, he was part of the cast of Eugene O'Neill's Ah, Wilderness! for The Theatre Guild on the Air.

In 1949, as part of the promotional campaign for the film The Heiress, he played Heathcliff in the one-hour version of Wuthering Heights for Ford Theatre. In January 1951, he participated in the episode "The Metal in the Moon" for the series Cavalcade of America, sponsored by the chemical company DuPont Company. Also in 1951, Clift was cast for the first time as Tom in the radio world premiere of Tennessee Williams' The Glass Menagerie, with Helen Hayes (Amanda) and Karl Malden (the Gentleman Caller), for The Theatre Guild on the Air.

Clift did not serve during World War II, having been given 4-F status after suffering dysentery in 1942. Immediately following the end of the war in September 1945 (in what would be Clift's penultimate Broadway performance,) he starred in the stage adaptation of D.H. Lawrence's short story You Touched Me. He and actor Kevin McCarthy later wrote a screenplay for a film adaptation that was never made.

By this time, Clift had developed what would come to be regarded as his signature acting style and biggest impact on the future of modern film acting, as told by biographer Robert LaGuardia:

He managed to convince the audience that he was unmitigated male sexuality without making a vulgar display of himself, as most other actors of his age and type would have. How? He used inner silence, unusual pauses in his speeches, awkward body movements. He spoke so quietly that at times he was practically inaudible. He shifted his moods erratically, from a brooding pose to a bursting smile. These were extremely unorthodox, risky procedures, and had the effect of involving the audience with him, an exceedingly selfish aim if one thinks only in terms of the play, but a daring and stupendously courageous maneuver when one thinks of the ground he was breaking.

== Career ==
=== Rise to film stardom: 1946–1956 ===
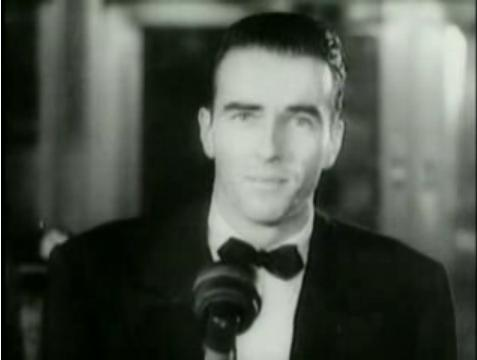
Clift at the premiere of A Place in the Sun (1951)

At age 25, Clift's first Hollywood film role was opposite John Wayne in the Western film Red River; director Howard Hawks was impressed by his recent stage performance and was willing to sign him with no strings attached, which greatly appealed to Clift's sense of independence. Although filmed in 1946, the film was delayed release until August 1948. A critical and commercial success, the film was nominated for two Academy Awards.

Clift's second film role (though it premiered first that same year) was The Search, which earned him his first nomination for an Academy Award for Best Actor. Clift's naturalistic performance led to director Fred Zinnemann's being asked, "Where did you find a soldier who can act so well?" Clift was unhappy with the quality of the script, and reworked it himself. The film was awarded a screenwriting Academy Award for the credited writers. MGM distributed the film nationwide as magazines generated massive attention for Clift.

Paramount Pictures ended up offering him the best of any incoming studio offer (which he accepted): a three-film deal (down from the typical seven-year contract) that came with the freedom to turn down any script and any director, as well as the right for either himself or the studio to terminate the agreement at any time.

Every major Hollywood studio wanted to make a deal with Clift and was collectively shocked that a young actor could command such leverage after the release of a single film: "the death knell of the producers and the moguls, and the birth of Actor Power." Clift was on the cover of Life magazine by December 1948. Look magazine gave him its Achievement Award and called him "the most promising star on the Hollywood horizon."

Clift's first film for Paramount was The Heiress (1949). While director William Wyler notably had difficulty with his poor posture, co-star Olivia de Havilland expressed difficulty with his seriousness, saying that "Monty was painstaking and I liked that about him, but I had a sense that Monty was thinking almost entirely of himself and leaving me out of the scene."

He tended to funnel most of his energy into intense rehearsals with acting coach Mira Rostova who accompanied him on set. Overall he ended up unhappy with his performance and left early during the film's premiere.

The following summer in 1949, Clift shot The Big Lift in Berlin. It was intended to be more of a semi-documentary, pro-America wartime film and less an acting vehicle, but was still a welcome opportunity for Clift to portray a U.S. soldier. Clift, having toured Europe before the war, was shocked by the 'unbelievable conditions' of rubble in Berlin.

Clift's next role as the drifter George Eastman in A Place in the Sun (1951) is regarded as one of his signature method acting performances. He worked extensively on his character, and was again nominated for an Academy Award for Best Actor. For his character's scenes in jail, Clift spent a night in a real state prison.

His main acting rival (and fellow Omaha native), Marlon Brando, was so moved by Clift's performance that he voted for Clift to win the Academy Award for Best Actor, sure that he would win, while Clift voted for Brando in A Streetcar Named Desire.

A Place in the Sun was critically acclaimed; Charlie Chaplin called it "the greatest movie made about America". The film received added media attention due to the rumors that Clift and co-star Elizabeth Taylor were dating in real life.

After a break, Clift committed himself to three more films, all of which premiered during 1953: I Confess to be directed by Alfred Hitchcock, Vittorio De Sica's Terminal Station, and Fred Zinnemann's From Here to Eternity, which earned Clift his third Academy Award nomination (the second of two nominations for films directed by Zinnemann). For the latter, Clift committed to building strength and endurance by jogging laps around Hollywood High School, learning boxing from Mushy Callahan and author James Jones, and how to imitate playing the bugle and reading sheet music from trumpeter Mannie Klein for the role of middleweight boxer and bugle-playing soldier Private Robert E. Lee Prewitt. During the casting of From Here to Eternity, Harry Cohn opposed Clift for the part of Prewitt, opting for John Derek or Aldo Ray instead. However, Jones and Zinnemann preferred Clift and personally campaigned for him for the role. Clift visited Jones several times at his homes in Arizona and Illinois and modeled the character after Jones himself. After seeing the film, Jones commended Clift for his portrayal of Prewitt. Clift supported and mentored Frank Sinatra in his role as Private Angelo Maggio. Sinatra later said, "I learned more about acting from him than I ever knew before".

=== Car crash ===
On the evening of May 12, 1956, while filming Raintree County, Clift was involved in a serious car crash after leaving a dinner party in Beverly Hills, California, hosted by Elizabeth Taylor and her then husband, Michael Wilding. Clift had veered off one of the twisting hairpin turns and smashed into a telephone pole and the surrounding cliffside. Alerted by friend Kevin McCarthy, who witnessed the collision, Taylor found Clift under the shattered dashboard, conscious but with his face bleeding and swelling rapidly. She pulled out a hanging tooth that was cutting into his tongue before accompanying him into the ambulance.

He suffered a concussion, broken jaw and nose, fractured sinuses and cheekbones, and several facial lacerations that required plastic surgery. In a filmed interview years later in 1963, Clift described his injuries in detail, including how his broken nose could be snapped back into place.

After a two-month recovery period, Clift returned to the set to finish the film. Despite the studio's concerns over profits, Clift correctly predicted the film would do well, if only because moviegoers would flock to see the difference in his facial appearance before and after the crash.

Although the results of Clift's plastic surgeries were remarkable for the time in leaving no visible scars, the differences in his facial appearance were noticeable, particularly the left side of his face, which was nearly immobile.

Continued pain from his injuries led him to rely on alcohol and pills for relief, as he had done after an earlier bout with dysentery left him with chronic intestinal problems. As a result, Clift's health and physical appearance deteriorated.

=== Later film career: 1957–1966 ===
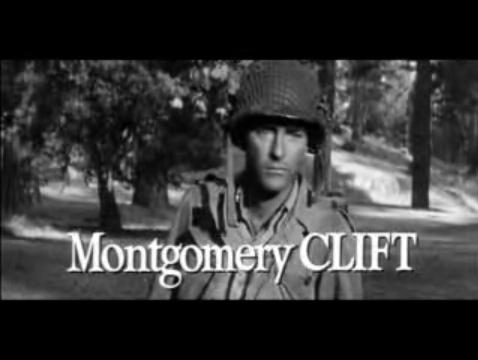
Clift in the trailer for The Young Lions (1958)

For the next nine years, Clift made nearly as many films after his traumatic car accident as he had previously. Still, the last half of his 20-year career has been referred to as the "longest suicide in Hollywood history" by acting teacher Robert Lewis because of Clift's subsequent abuse of painkillers and alcohol. He began to behave erratically in public, which embarrassed his friends. His next four films were The Young Lions (1958), which is the only film featuring both Clift and Marlon Brando, Lonelyhearts (1958), Suddenly, Last Summer (1959), and Elia Kazan's Wild River, released in 1960.

With his next two films, The Misfits (1961) and Judgment at Nuremberg (1961), Clift pivoted to somewhat smaller supporting or cameo roles that required less overall screen time, while still delivering demanding performances. Playing the faded rodeo rider Perce Howland in The Misfits, his first, introductory scene, performed inside a phone booth, only took two hours of the scheduled two shooting days, which impressed cast and crew. Marilyn Monroe (in what was to be her last filmed role) was also having emotional and substance-abuse problems at the time; she described Clift in a 1961 interview as "the only person I know who is in even worse shape than I am".

In his 12-minute cameo scene in Judgment at Nuremberg (1961), Clift played a developmentally disabled German baker who had been a victim of the Nazi sterilisation programme testifying at the Nuremberg trials. Clift was willing to waive his fee entirely, accepting the supporting part with minimum compensation. His anguished performance (which earned him his fourth Academy Award nomination) was often thought to be due to his own nervous breakdown. Director Stanley Kramer later wrote in his memoirs that Clift "wasn't always close to the script, but whatever he said fitted in perfectly" and that he suggested Clift turn to Spencer Tracy to "ad lib something" when he struggled to remember his lines for his one scene. In nephew Robert Anderson Clift's 2018 documentary, superimposed pages of Clift's own heavily annotated original script show that the actor was actually deliberately and consciously performing with his own rewritten dialogue as opposed to confused improvisation. On a taped phone call, Clift said that he played the character in a way that "holds onto himself, in spite of himself" with dignity.

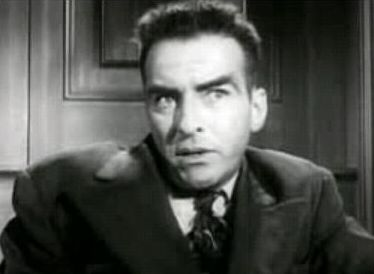
Clift in Judgment at Nuremberg (1961)

After completing John Huston's Freud: The Secret Passion (1962), Universal Studios sued him for his frequent absences that caused the film to go over budget. Clift countersued with the assertion that he struggled to keep up with an overwhelming volume of last-minute script revisions and that an accidental blow to both eyes on set gave him cataracts. The case was later settled out of court with evidence in Clift's favor, but the damage to Clift's reputation as unreliable and troublesome endured. As a consequence, he was unable to find film work for four years. The film's success at the box office brought numerous awards for screenwriting and directing, but none for Clift himself.

On January 13, 1963, a few weeks after the initial release of Freud, Clift appeared on the live television discussion program The Hy Gardner Show, where he spoke at length about the release of his current film, his film career, and his treatment by the press. He also talked publicly for the first time about his 1956 car accident, the injuries he received, and its after-effects on his appearance. During the interview, Gardner jokingly mentioned that it is "the first and last appearance on a television interview program for Montgomery Clift".

Barred from feature films, Clift turned to voice work. In 1964, he recorded for Caedmon Records The Glass Menagerie, with Jessica Tandy, Julie Harris, and David Wayne. In 1965, he gave voice to William Faulkner's writings in the television documentary William Faulkner's Mississippi, which aired in April 1965.

During this time, Peter Bogdanovich was working at a cinema in New York City when Clift came to see a revival screening of one of his early films – I Confess (1953) – and decided to show him the guestbook where a cinema patron had written down a film request for "Anything with Montgomery Clift!"

Elizabeth Taylor put her salary on the line as insurance to have Clift cast as her co-star in Reflections in a Golden Eye, to be directed by John Huston. In preparation for the shooting of this film, Clift accepted the role of James Bower in the French Cold War thriller The Defector, which was filmed in West Germany from February to April 1966. He insisted on performing his stunts himself, including swimming in the River Elbe in March. The schedule for Reflections in a Golden Eye was then set for August 1966, but Clift died in July 1966. Marlon Brando was cast as his replacement.

== Personal life ==
Clift is said to have valued privacy and ambiguity in his personal life, though he was known to be friendly and affectionate, blurring the emotions of platonic love and sexual attraction, particularly with close friend Elizabeth Taylor. Paramount Pictures arranged for her to attend the Los Angeles premiere of The Heiress as Clift's date to generate publicity. Paramount executive Luigi Luraschi remembered that Taylor, like many American teenagers, seemed "unmistakably in love" with Clift around the time of filming A Place in the Sun, which commenced soon after that premiere outing.

Throughout the 1950s, Clift and Taylor starred together as romantic leads in three films: A Place in the Sun, Raintree County, and Suddenly, Last Summer. Their romantic scenes in A Place in the Sun received considerable acclaim for their naturalness and authentic appearance. Taylor remained a loyal friend to Clift until his death.

In 2000, at the GLAAD Media Awards, where Taylor was honored for her work for the LGBT community, she made the first public declaration by anyone that Clift was gay and called him her closest friend and confidant. Clift's brother claimed he was bisexual. When Clift began therapy in late 1950, he told his psychiatrist, "he thought he was homosexual and he wanted to know how to deal with it." After his death, in a taped telephone conversation with his brother, Clift's mother stated that she had known early on that Clift was homosexual.

Many of Clift's biographers cite his relationships with men and a few women based on friends' accounts and interviews. He was linked to actresses Libby Holman and Phyllis Thaxter. However, Clift's longest relationships were with men. He was involved with Adventures of Superman actor Jack Larson and theater actor William LeMassena, with whom he had a three-year relationship. LeMassena remained a close friend to Clift until his death. He described their relationship with fondness and kept taped film reels of Clift and the company of There Shall Be No Night enjoying leisure time together.

Clift was deeply and intensely involved with Broadway choreographer Jerome Robbins; "few associates were aware of how intimate and emotionally charged the relationship between Clift and Robbins was." They camouflaged their relationship by dating women. In 1948, when Clift left Robbins to pursue a movie career in Hollywood, the announcement devastated Robbins. He told Clift, "I could make you love me," at the end of their two-year affair.

Robbins is said to have conceived the basic plot of West Side Story after Clift shared the idea with him, according to actor Russ Tamblyn. In 2021, Tamblyn recalled that Robbins "told us on the set one day that the idea really came from Montgomery Clift, who was Jerry's boyfriend at the time... He said that he was with Monty at a party on Fire Island... [and Clift said] 'I've got an idea for a musical. Why not have a musical about Romeo and Juliet, but make it with gangs in New York?' And Jerry said that he just couldn't get it out of his head." Robbins called Clift a "theatrical genius" early on in their affair.

In the early 1950s, Barney Balaban (the president of Paramount Pictures) invited Clift on one of the Balaban family vacations to Nassau in the Bahamas. Judy Balaban, his daughter, claimed that she had an immediate connection with Clift and the two were "joined at the hip", dating for many months following. She attended the New York premiere of A Place in the Sun in August 1951 as his date.

Before his relationship with Balaban, Clift had received a barrage of blackmail phone calls at his residence, threatening to out him as homosexual, which resulted in Clift having to repeatedly change his number.

While the press assumed that Balaban and Clift were an item, Clift secretly dated British actor Roddy McDowall. According to Balaban, she was naïve about Clift's sexual orientation and his romantic involvement with McDowall, who would occasionally accompany them on public outings. McDowall was introduced to Clift by his Lassie Come Home co-star Elizabeth Taylor. During the two and a half years that Clift stayed away from films, McDowall's career was nonexistent. He devoted himself entirely to Clift and moved from Los Angeles to New York City to be closer to his idol. Reportedly, McDowall attempted suicide after their breakup. Nevertheless, he showed no bitterness and also remained one of Clift's loyal friends. McDowall starred with Clift in his final picture, The Defector. Clift later stated that he could never have finished the film without McDowall's moral support.

While filming for Vittorio De Sica in Italy, Clift had a romance with Truman Capote. Author James Jones and Clift became very close during the filming of From Here to Eternity. Jones publicly stated, "I would have had an affair with him, but he never asked me." One of Clift's first intimate relationships was with composer Lehman Engel. He was also involved with Donald Windham and his partner Sandy Campbell. In his memoir, Arthur Laurents suggests that Clift had a fling with Farley Granger.

Clift was also friends with Marlon Brando, who dropped by his home offering to accompany him to Alcoholics Anonymous meetings.

Clift supported Adlai Stevenson in the 1952 United States presidential election.

A documentary titled Making Montgomery Clift was made by his nephew, Robert Anderson Clift, in 2018, to clarify myths that were created about the actor.

== Death ==
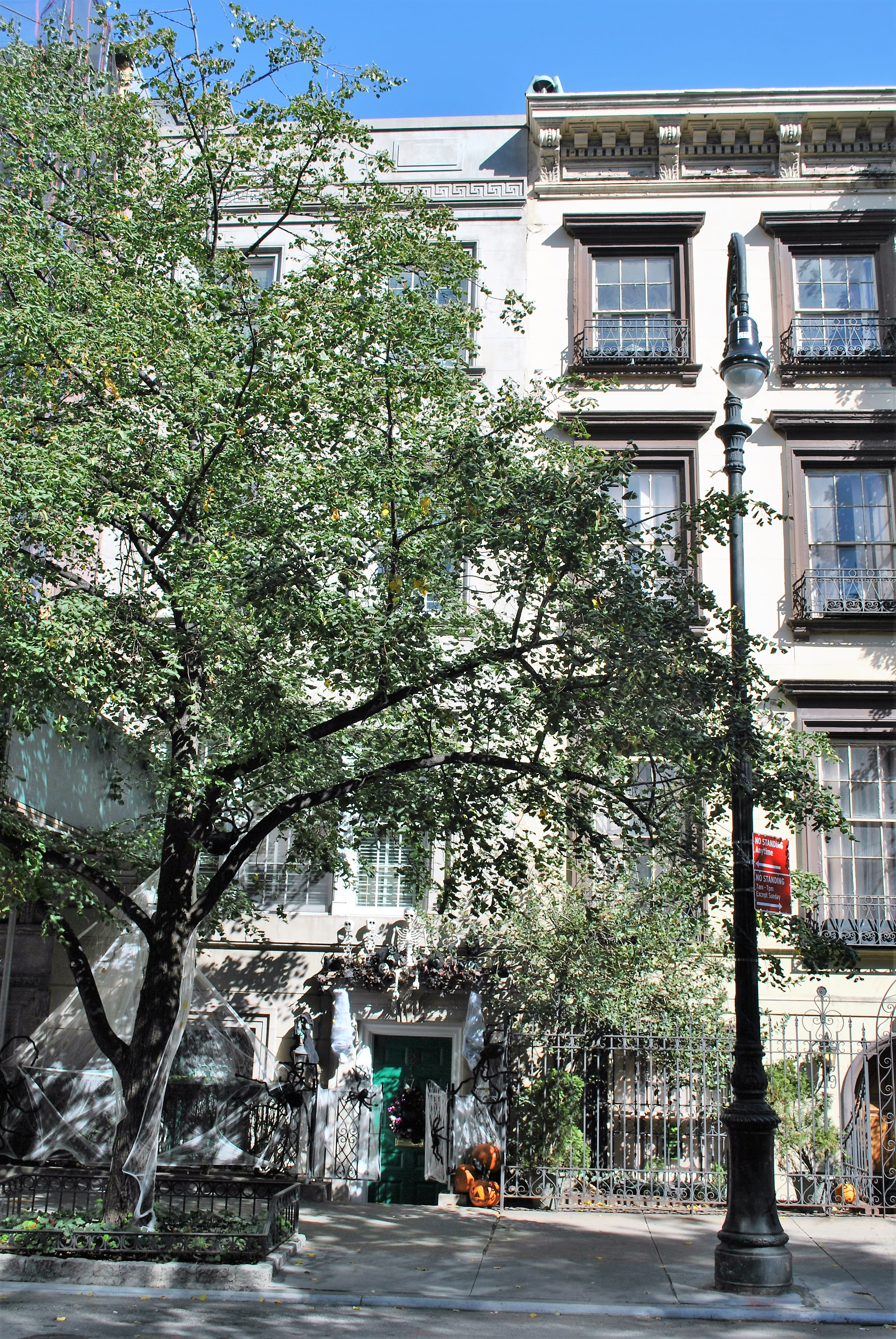
Montgomery Clift's former townhouse with green painted front door, where he died, located at 217 East 61st Street, Manhattan, New York City.

On July 22, 1966, Clift spent most of the day in his New York City townhouse, located at 217 East 61st Street. His private nurse and companion, Lorenzo James, said he had not spoken much all day. Reportedly, between midnight and 1 a.m., James asked Clift, who was in his bed and reading a book, whether he would be interested in viewing a rebroadcast of The Misfits that was airing as a late-night movie. "Absolutely not!" exclaimed Clift, and James went to his own bedroom to sleep, without saying another word to Clift.

At 6:30 a.m., James woke up and went to wake Clift, but found the bedroom door closed and locked. Concerned and unable to break the door down, James ran down to the back garden and climbed up a ladder to enter through the second-floor bedroom window. Inside, he found Clift dead; he was undressed, lying in his bed still wearing his eyeglasses and with both fists clenched by his side. James used the bedroom telephone to call some of Clift's personal physicians and the medical examiner's office before an ambulance arrived.

Clift's body was taken to the city morgue. The subsequent autopsy report cited the cause of death as a heart attack brought on by "occlusive coronary artery disease". No evidence was found to suggest foul play or suicide.

Drug addiction is commonly believed to have been responsible for Clift's many health problems and his death. In addition to lingering effects of dysentery and chronic colitis, an underactive thyroid was later revealed during the autopsy. The condition — among other things — lowers blood pressure; it could have caused Clift to appear drunk or drugged when he was sober.

Following a 15-minute funeral at St. James' Church on Madison Avenue in Manhattan, which was attended by 150 guests, including Lauren Bacall, Frank Sinatra, and Nancy Walker, Clift was buried in the Friends Quaker Cemetery, Prospect Park, Brooklyn. Elizabeth Taylor, who was in Rome, sent flowers, as did Roddy McDowall, Judy Garland, Myrna Loy, and Lew Wasserman.

== Filmography ==
=== Film ===
Year	Title	Role	Director	Notes
1948	The Search	Ralph "Steve" Stevenson	Fred Zinnemann	
1948	Red River	Matthew "Matt" Garth	Howard Hawks	
1949	The Heiress	Morris Townsend	William Wyler	
1950	The Big Lift	Danny MacCullough	George Seaton	
1951	A Place in the Sun	George Eastman	George Stevens	
1953	I Confess	Fr. Michael William Logan	Alfred Hitchcock	
1953	Terminal Station	Giovanni Doria	Vittorio De Sica	(re-edited and rereleased in the United States as Indiscretion of an American Wife)
1953	From Here to Eternity	Robert E. Lee "Prew" Prewitt	Fred Zinnemann	
1957	Raintree County	John Wickliff Shawnessy	Edward Dmytryk	
1958	The Young Lions	Noah Ackerman	Edward Dmytryk	
1958	Lonelyhearts	Adam White	Vincent J. Donehue	
1959	Suddenly, Last Summer	Dr. John Cukrowicz	Joseph L. Mankiewicz	
1960	Wild River	Chuck Glover	Elia Kazan	
1961	The Misfits	Perce Howland	John Huston	
1961	Judgment at Nuremberg	Rudolph Petersen	Stanley Kramer	
1962	Freud: The Secret Passion	Sigmund Freud	John Huston	
1966	The Defector	Prof. James Bower	Raoul Lévy	Posthumous release

=== Film roles declined ===
Clift received and declined offers for roles in the following films:

- The Adventures of Tom Sawyer (1938) – Tommy Kelly was later cast
- Mrs. Miniver (1942) – Richard Ney was later cast
- Rope (1948) – John Dall was later cast
- Sunset Boulevard (1950) – exited contract before filming; was replaced by William Holden
- High Noon (1952) – Gary Cooper was later cast
- Act of Love (1953) – Kirk Douglas was later cast
- Shane (1953) – Alan Ladd was later cast
- Désirée (1954) – Marlon Brando was later cast
- On the Waterfront (1954) – Marlon Brando was later cast
- Suddenly (1954) Frank Sinatra was later cast.
- A Star Is Born (1954) – James Mason was later cast
- East of Eden (1955) – Richard Davalos was later cast
- Not as a Stranger (1955) – Robert Mitchum was later cast
- Prince of Players (1955) – Richard Burton was later cast
- War and Peace (1956) – Henry Fonda was later cast
- Friendly Persuasion (1956) – Anthony Perkins was later cast
- The Bridge on the River Kwai (1957) – Geoffrey Horne was later cast
- Cat on a Hot Tin Roof (1958) – Paul Newman was later cast
- Rio Bravo (1959) – Dean Martin was later cast
- Sons and Lovers (1960) – exited contract before filming; Dean Stockwell was later cast
- Fahrenheit 451 (1966) – Oskar Werner was later cast

=== Television ===
Year	Title	Role	Notes
1939	Hay Fever	Performer	Television Movie
1963	What's My Line?	Mystery Guest	Episode: Montgomery Clift
1963	The Merv Griffin Show	Self	Season 1 - Episode: 86
1965	William Faulkner's Mississippi	Narrator	Television Documentary

=== Theatre ===
Year	Title	Role	Venue
1933	As Husbands Go	Performer	Sarasota, Florida
1935	Fly Away Home	Harmer Masters	48th Street Theatre, Broadway
1935	Jubilee	Prince Peter	Imperial Theatre, Broadway
1938	Yr. Obedient Husband	Lord Finch	Broadhurst Theatre, Broadway
1938	Eye On the Sparrow	Philip Thomas	Vanderbilt Theatre, Broadway
1938	The Wind and the Rain	Charles Tritton	Millbrook Theatre, New York
1938	Dame Nature	Andre Brisac	Booth Theatre, Broadway
1939	The Mother	Tony	Lyceum Theatre, Broadway
1940	There Shall Be No Night	Erik Valkonen	Alvin Theatre, Broadway
1941	Out of the Frying Pan	Performer	Country Theater, Suffern
1942	Mexican Mural	Lalo Brito	Chain Auditorium, New York
1942	The Skin of Our Teeth	Henry	Plymouth Theatre, Broadway
1944	Our Town	George Gibbs	City Center, Broadway
1944	The Searching Wind	Samuel Hazen	Fulton Theatre, Broadway
1945	Foxhole in the Parlor	Dennis Patterson	Ethel Barrymore Theatre, Broadway
1945	You Touched Me	Hadrian	Booth Theatre, Broadway
1954	The Seagull	Constantin Treplev	Phoenix Theatre, Off-Broadway

=== Radio ===
Year	Programme	Episode	Ref.
1951	Theatre Guild on the Air	The Glass Menagerie	

== Awards and nominations ==
Year	Awards	Category	Project	Award	Ref.
1948	Academy Awards	Best Actor	The Search	Nominated	
1951	Academy Awards	Best Actor	A Place in the Sun	Nominated	
1953	Academy Awards	Best Actor	From Here to Eternity	Nominated	
1961	Academy Awards	Best Supporting Actor	Judgment at Nuremberg	Nominated	
1961	British Academy Film Awards	Best Foreign Actor	Judgment at Nuremberg	Nominated	
1961	Golden Globe Awards	Best Supporting Actor – Motion Picture	Judgment at Nuremberg	Nominated	
1965	New York Emmy Awards	Individuals	Faulkner's Mississippi	Won	

In 1960, Clift was honored with a star on the Hollywood Walk of Fame at 6104 Hollywood Boulevard.

== In popular culture ==
The song "The Right Profile" by the English punk rock band the Clash, from their album London Calling, is about the later life of Clift. The song alludes to his car crash and drug abuse, as well as the movies A Place in the Sun, Red River, From Here to Eternity, and The Misfits, before closing with what Rolling Stone magazine describes as "a grudging admiration that becomes unexpectedly and astonishingly moving." "Monty Got a Raw Deal" by rock band R.E.M. is also about him. The song "Montgomery Clift" by British band Random Hold concerns the legend that Clift enjoyed hanging from the window ledges of tall buildings.

In the 2007 novel Zeroville and its 2019 film adaptation, the main character, Vikar, is fascinated by Clift. He has a tattoo of Clift and Elizabeth Taylor on his shaved head. Clift, portrayed by Dave Franco, appears briefly in the movie.

Clift (portrayed by Gavin Adams) was a major supporting character in the 2020 feature film As Long As I'm Famous, which explored his intimate relationship with a young Sidney Lumet during the summer of 1948. In 1978, Lumet purchased the rights to Patricia Bosworth's recently published biography, from which he planned to extract biopics of both Clift's mother and the actor himself. Although reports of the project persisted as late as December of the following year (including reports of actor Gregory Rozakis being considered for the lead role), no further progress was reported and neither film ever materialized.

== See also ==
- List of actors with Academy Award nominations
- List of actors with two or more Academy Award nominations in acting categories
- List of LGBT Academy Award winners and nominees

== Works cited ==
- Bosworth, Patricia (1978). Montgomery Clift: A Biography. Hal Leonard Corporation, 2007. N.B.: Also published in mass-market pbk. ed. (New York: Bantam Books, 1978); originally published by Harcourt, 1978. ISBN 0-87910-135-0 (H. Leonard), ISBN 0-553-12455-2 (Bantam)
- Capua, Michelangelo (2002). Montgomery Clift: A Biography. McFarland. ISBN 978-0-7864-1432-1
- Casillo, Charles (2021). Elizabeth and Monty: The Untold Story of Their Intimate Friendship. Kensington Books. ISBN 978-1-4967-2481-6.
- Clift, Robert Anderson; Demmon, Hillary (2018). Making Montgomery Clift. 1091 Pictures.
- Girelli, Elisabetta (2013) "Montgomery Clift Queer Star", Wayne University Press. ISBN 9780814335147
- Kramer, Stanley and Thomas M. Coffey (1997). A Mad, Mad, Mad, Mad World: A Life in Hollywood. ISBN 0-15-154958-3
- LaGuardia, Robert (1977). Monty: A Biography of Montgomery Clift. New York, Avon Books. ISBN 0-380-01887-X (paperback edition)
- Lawrence, Amy (2010) "The Passion of Montgomery Clift", Berkeley and Los Angeles, University of California Press. ISBN 9780520260474
- McCann, Graham (1991). Rebel Males: Clift, Brando and Dean. H. Hamilton. ISBN 978-0-241-12884-8
- Pearson, Joseph (2025). Sweet Victory: How the Berlin Airlift Divided East and West. New York: Pegasus Books. ISBN 9781639368587.
