= James Bridges =

American film director (1936–1993)

Jimmy Bridges
- Born: James McKeen Bridges; February 3, 1936; Little Rock, Arkansas, U.S.
- Died: June 6, 1993 (aged 57); Los Angeles, California, U.S.
- Occupations: Screenwriter; film director; film producer; actor
- Partner: Jack Larson (1958—1993; Bridges' death)

James McKeen Bridges (February 3, 1936 – June 6, 1993) was an American screenwriter, film director, producer, and actor. He was a two-time Oscar nominee: once for Best Original Screenplay for The China Syndrome and once for Best Adapted Screenplay for The Paper Chase.

== Personal life ==
James McKeen Bridges was born on February 3, 1936 in Little Rock, Arkansas and grew up in Paris, Arkansas. (Some sources indicate he was born in Paris.) He was born to teenaged parents, Doy Eugene Bridges (1917–1989) and Mary Celestine (née McKeen) Bridges (1918–2002). His parents' marriage ended when Bridges was a youngster. His mother later married Melvin Floyd Wiggins and had a daughter, Mary Ann Wiggins. Bridges was nicknamed "Jimmy Mac" or "Jimmy Mack" by his schoolmates.

Bridges' life partner from 1958 until his death was actor, librettist, screenwriter, and producer Jack Larson.

== Career ==
Bridges got his start as a writer for Alfred Hitchcock Presents after catching the attention of Norman Lloyd, a producer for the series. One of his episodes, "An Unlocked Window", earned him a 1966 Edgar Award from the Mystery Writers of America for Best Episode in a TV Series.

Bridges wrote and directed a number of notable films, including The Baby Maker; The Paper Chase; September 30, 1955; The China Syndrome; Urban Cowboy; Mike's Murder; Perfect; and Bright Lights, Big City. Bridges was a mentor to actress Debra Winger.

== Death ==
In 1990, Bridges was diagnosed with intestinal cancer, which he battled for three years. He died at the UCLA Medical Center on June 6, 1993, aged 57, with the immediate cause of death being kidney failure stemming from cancer. He was buried at Oakwood Cemetery in his hometown of Paris, Arkansas.

The James Bridges Theater at the University of California, Los Angeles was named in his honor in November 1999.

== Filmography ==
Film

Year	Title	Director	Writer	Producer
1966	The Appaloosa		Yes	
1970	Colossus: The Forbin Project		Yes	
1970	The Baby Maker	Yes	Yes	
1972	Limbo		Yes	
1973	The Paper Chase	Yes	Yes	
1977	September 30, 1955	Yes	Yes	
1979	The China Syndrome	Yes	Yes	
1980	Urban Cowboy	Yes	Yes	
1984	Mike's Murder	Yes	Yes	Yes
1985	Perfect	Yes	Yes	Yes
1986	Palimos ng pag-ibig		Yes	
1988	Bright Lights, Big City	Yes		
1990	White Hunter Black Heart		Yes	

TV writer

Year	Title	Notes
1963	The Great Adventure	Episode "Go Down, Moses"
1963–1965	The Alfred Hitchcock Hour	Episodes: "A Tangled Web"; "The Star Juror"; "Death and the Joyful Woman"; "Dear Uncle George"; "Run for Doom"; "The Cadaver"; "The Jar"; "Murder Case"; "Beast in View"; "The Gentleman Caller"; "Bed of Roses"; "Return of Verge Likens"; "Where the Woodbine Twineth"; "An Unlocked Window"; "Death Scene"; "Power of Attorney"
1969	The Flim-Flam Man	TV movie
1972	When Michael Calls	TV movie
1973	Carola	TV movie
1985	Alfred Hitchcock Presents	Episode "An Unlocked Window"
1978–1986	The Paper Chase	Episodes "The Paper Chase" and "The Seating Chart"
2007	SineSerye	Episode "Palimos ng pag-ibig"

Acting roles

Year	Title	Role	Notes
1957	Invasion of the Saucer Men	Bobby	
1957	Johnny Trouble	Ike	
1957–1958	Dragnet	—N/a	Episodes "The Big License Plates" and "The Big Hype"
1958	Mackenzie's Raiders	Private Lewis	Episode "Mackenzie's Raiders"
1958	Flight	—N/a	Episode "Experiment Oxygen"
1958	Shirley Temple's Storybook	—N/a	Episode "The Legend of Sleepy Hollow"
1958	Joy Ride	Dirk	
1964	Tarzan And Jane Regained... Sort Of	Lord of the forest	Andy Warhol film
1968	Faces	Extra	
