= Making Montgomery Clift =

- Theatrical release poster
- Directed by: Robert Anderson Clift; Hillary Demmon
- Cinematography: Robert Clift
- Edited by: Hillary Demmon
- Production company: Limbic Productions
- Release date: September 23, 2018
- Running time: 88 minutes
- Country: United States
- Language: English

Making Montgomery Clift is a 2018 American documentary film by directors Robert Anderson Clift and Hillary Demmon chronicling the life of actor Montgomery Clift until his death in 1966. It shows a different side of Clift, portraying him as a man who enjoyed life and love, and as comfortable with being a gay man.

The documentary was released at the Los Angeles Film Festival and was praised by the critics.

== Synopsis ==
Between the 1940s and 1960s Montgomery Clift saw highs and lows in both his career and personal life. In virtue of these, many myths were created mostly involving his repressed homosexuality and his depression due to a car accident that left severe facial lacerations requiring plastic surgery.

Directed by his nephew Robert Clift and Hillary Demmon, the film examines the inconsistent narratives from countless biographies which reduced his legacy and created labels like “tragically self-destructive” and “tormented”. The documentary shows Clift family and friends—including Jack Larson, who played Jimmy Olsen on the TV show Adventures of Superman—who attest to his joy and humor, and also Tucker Tooley, Michael Easton, Patricia Bosworth, and Vincent Newman.

== Critical reception ==
Making Montgomery Clift received widespread critical praise for reexamining the life of actor Montgomery Clift and challenging the long-standing image of him as a tragic figure. Critics highlighted the film's personal perspective and its thoughtful approach to biography.

Michael Schulman of The New Yorker called it “a fascinating study of the ethics of biography,” adding that the film “turns the act of biographical revision into a broader investigation of how truth is constructed.”

Film scholar David Bordwell described the documentary as “an alternative to standard celebrity portraiture,” noting that it “makes biography an essay, an argument, and an act of criticism.”

Sheri Linden of The Hollywood Reporter wrote that the film “strips away the myths...to reveal a portrait that feels both refreshingly authentic and long overdue.”

Writing for The Advocate, Trudy Ring noted that the film “reveals a side of Clift that had been hidden or distorted,” showing his wit and agency as a queer actor in Hollywood.

Chase Burns of The Stranger wrote, “Finally, someone gets Montgomery Clift’s biography right.”

Dan Callahan of TheWrap called the film “a more realistic picture of this committed, very loving and sophisticated artist who was forced to make very few compromises.” He described the title as “provocative” for its double meaning—referring both to posthumous myth-making and to old slang meaning “to sleep with someone.” He praised the film for clearing away decades of reductive psychological interpretations.

Ben Sachs of the Chicago Reader was more critical, noting that the film focuses more on correcting Clift's biography than exploring his film career, which he found “frustrating.” Still, he concluded that “his nephew does an admirable job assembling the truth.”

The film holds a 100% rating on Rotten Tomatoes based on positive reviews praising both its emotional depth and its approach to biography.

== Home media ==
The movie was released in digital, on demand, and DVD.
