= September 30, 1955 =

1977 film by James Bridges

- Directed by: James Bridges
- Written by: James Bridges
- Produced by: Jerry Weintraub
- Starring: Richard Thomas; Susan Tyrrell; Collin Wilcox
- Cinematography: Gordon Willis
- Edited by: Jeff Gourson
- Music by: Leonard Rosenman
- Distributed by: Universal Pictures
- Release dates: August 1977 (Montréal Film Festival); January 6, 1978 (wide release)
- Running time: 101 minutes
- Country: United States
- Language: English

September 30, 1955 (originally titled 9/30/55) is a 1977 drama film written and directed by James Bridges and starring Richard Thomas.

== Plot ==
On the evening of September 30, 1955 in Conway, Arkansas, college student Jimmy J. watches the film East of Eden alone in a theater. The next day at football practice, he hears that the film's star, James Dean, was killed in a road accident in California around the same time that Jimmy J. was viewing the film. He runs to the local radio station, desperate to learn the details. The radio disk jockey, while reading the morning news on-air, makes a brief announcement of James Dean's death.

Jimmy J. calls his friend Billie Jean Turner, a working-class girl who also admires Dean. Jimmy J. takes his girlfriend Charlotte Smith, his roommate Hanley and another college couple, Frank and his girlfriend Pat, off-campus in Jimmy J's car. They buy some food at a local grocery store and Jimmy J. steals some liquor. They have a party on the banks of Arkansas River, where Jimmy J. grows upset that his friends do not understand the depth of his grief. When Frank belittles Jimmy J. for caring so much about someone whom he has never met, Jimmy J. explains that he has seen East of Eden four times, and that the absent Billie Jean has seen it 22 times, and they have been anticipating the release of Dean's Rebel Without a Cause later that month.

Jimmy J. sculpts an Academy Award statuette out of mud, strips to his underwear, covers himself in dirt and wet sand, and conducts a ceremony to summon Dean's spirit. He perceives a dog barking in the distance as a sign. The police arrive, but the group escapes back to town, where Frank and Pat tell Jimmy J. that he is disturbed. Charlotte agrees to let Jimmy J. continue the séance at her house later.

Returning to his dormitory, Jimmy J. is surprised that his mother, little brother Dickie and aunt Ethel have come to take him to a movie. His mother is disappointed by his dirty appearance and worries that he will end up a loser like his estranged father. Jimmy J. calls Billie Jean and invites her to Charlotte's house that evening for the séance. Coach Haynes arrives at the dorm to confront Jimmy J., disciplining him for leaving football practice that morning.

Fellow student Eugene joins Jimmy J. and Hanley as they leave the campus once again, and they stop to pick up Billie Jean, finding her dressed like the character Vampira (a real-life paramour of James Dean), wearing heavy makeup and a black cape. She attempts to seduce Jimmy J., but he rebuffs her. At Charlotte's house, Billie Jean darkens the room, lights candles and clears the furniture. When Charlotte and Jimmy J. are alone, she confronts him about Billie Jean, but he states that, though he is untrustworthy like his father, he has not had sex with Billie Jean. When the group uses a Ouija board to contact Dean, only Jimmy J. and Billie Jean feel his presence.

That night, the group wreaks havoc at the local cemetery, but when the police arrive, Billie Jean drops a candelabrum and her cape catches on fire, leaving her badly burned.

Three weeks later at the homecoming parade, Jimmy J. arrives on a motorcycle, sees Charlotte riding a float and climbs aboard to speak with her. He confronts her for breaking up with him, kisses her, and climbs down. Hanley spots Jimmy J. and greets him warmly as Frank and Pat ride past in the parade, with Frank yelling that he thought that Jimmy J. had been kicked out of school. Eugene is also at the parade as part of the marching band and waves to Jimmy J.

Jimmy J. visits Billie Jean, who is home from the hospital and has not spoken since the accident. She is nearly covered in bandages. Jimmy J. confesses that he went to see Rebel Without a Cause the previous night, watching it four times so that he could tell her all the details. He recounts how the movie parallels his own life and explains that he is responsible for Billie Jean's injuries in the same way that Dean's character Jim Stark is responsible for Sal Mineo's character Plato Crawford's death. He asks her forgiveness, as he is leaving for California to visit the spot where Dean died, and begs her to speak, since her mother, Melba Lou, has expressed her intentions to send her to a sanitorium for electroshock treatment in the hope of ending her muteness. Speaking for the first time, Billie Jean yells at him to "stop it," begs not to be sent to the sanitorium, and demands that he shatter her mirrors so that she cannot see her scarred body. He obliges her and breaks the mirrors. Melba Lou enters, sees the damaged furniture, and upon hearing Billie Jean's cries not to be committed, gets mad that Jimmy J. has revealed her intentions, and joins her daughter in telling Jimmy J. that life is not a movie. Jimmy J. leaves.

Watching the homecoming football game from a distance, Jimmy J. watches Charlotte's coronation as football queen. He then rides off on his motorcycle, headed to California.

== Cast ==
- Richard Thomas as Jimmy "Jimmy J"
- Susan Tyrrell as Melba Lou Turner
- Deborah Benson as Charlotte Smith
- Lisa Blount as Billie Jean Turner
- Thomas Hulce as Hanley
- Dennis Quaid as Frank
- Mary Kai Clark as Pat
- Dennis Christopher as Eugene
- Collin Wilcox as Jimmy's Mother
- Ben Fuhrman as Coach Haynes
- Tom Bonner as DJ
- Bryan White as Dickie
- Ouida White as Ethel

== Production ==
Filming was delayed for a year after Richard Thomas broke his ankle in a motorcycle accident. The original cast included some Arkansas-based actors, such as an actor assigned to the part of Eugene, but with the delay in filming the actor had grown out of the part and he was recast with Dennis Christopher.

== Critical reception ==
Vincent Canby of The New York Times called the film "... funny, solemn, dead-on-accurate." While he said that the film, "lacks the edge of satire that can make the difference between a good film and a great one, between a film that is somehow in thrall to its sentiments instead of being in charm of them," he also states that the characterization of Jimmy J. (Thomas) "says something (and scary) about the influence of what are sometimes called the popular arts ... [and makes the film] so interesting."

Ryan Keefer of DVD Talk, reviewing the Blu-ray edition released by Kino Lorber, stated that:

There are moments when September 30, 1955 comes off as more of an After School Special, but it's intentions are heartfelt and its execution almost meets it. But it doesn't have much of a ceiling past lonely stray thoughts of a country teenager (and perhaps a little warped if the final moments are any indication), but it serves as a nice view into what a death symbolize for a young person, even if the young person is John–Boy.
