= The Atlas of the DC Universe =

- Author: Paul Kupperberg
- Illustrator: Paris Cullins, John Stracuzzi, Chris Ferguson
- Language: English
- Genre: Superhero fiction, Atlas
- Publisher: Mayfair Games
- Publication date: 1990
- Publication place: United States
- Media type: Paperback
- ISBN: 978-0-923763-19-0

The Atlas of the DC Universe by Paul Kupperberg was published in 1990 by Mayfair Games as a supplement to its DC Heroes role-playing game. It includes maps and information about locations in the DC Universe; for example, it places Metropolis in Delaware and Gotham City in New Jersey.

== Content ==
The Atlas of the DC Universe was designed to serve both as a gaming material for the DC Heroes role-playing game, published by Mayfair, and a standalone "in-universe" reference book for the fans of DC Comics. Many of the cities, such as Metropolis and Star City, were given exact locations on maps provided within the book.

Maps of the galaxy, and other important planets within the DC universe are also included.

== Reception ==
Gene Alloway reviewed The Atlas of the DC Universe in White Wolf #31 (May/June, 1992), rating it a 3 out of 5 and stated that "The Atlas is a good product, despite some areas that might need some added information. The layout is straightforward, clear, and not flashy, but sufficient. I recommend this one highly for the one-stop shopping for geography it offers alone."
