= Jack Larson =

American actor and writer (1928–2015)

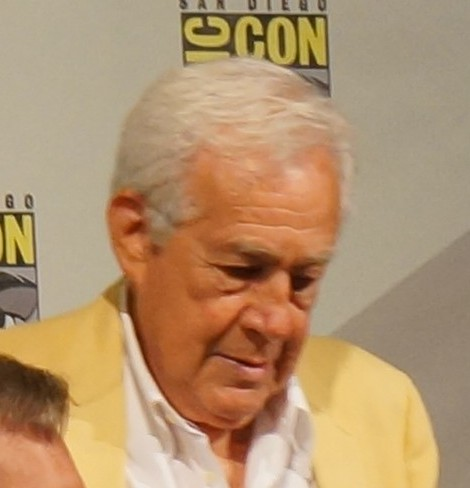
- Larson at the 2013 San Diego Comic-Con
- Born: Jack Edward Larson; February 8, 1928; Los Angeles, California, U.S.
- Died: September 20, 2015 (aged 87); Los Angeles, California, U.S.
- Occupations: Actor, librettist, screenwriter, producer
- Years active: 1948–2011
- Partner: James Bridges (1958–1993; Bridges' death)
- Awards: Inkpot Award (2013)

Jack Edward Larson (February 8, 1928 – September 20, 2015) was an American actor, librettist, screenwriter and producer best known for his portrayal of photographer/cub reporter Jimmy Olsen on the television series Adventures of Superman from 1952 to 1958, a role he once reprised on Lois & Clark: The New Adventures of Superman in 1996.

== Life and career ==
Larson was born on February 8, 1928 in Los Angeles, the son of Anita (Calacoff), a Western Union clerk, and George Larson, a milk truck driver. His father was of English and Swedish descent and his mother was from a Jewish family (from Germany and Russia). He was raised in Pasadena. He graduated from Montebello High School in 1945, aged 17 and at times claimed 1933 as his birth year. His first film appearance was in junior high, in a short about ten pin bowling.

He found the role of cub reporter Jimmy Olsen on The Adventures of Superman to be a handicap, because he became typecast as a naive young man. This caused him to do little acting after the show ended in 1958, and he turned to writing and production, with an output that included plays, a libretto, texts for classical music, and movies such as The Baby Maker. In later years his attitude towards the Jimmy Olsen role warmed, as he focused more on the love people had for the character. Larson was always willing to sit for interviews about the Superman series and his connection to it, and began having a number of cameos that paid subtle tribute to his character and the series, including a 1991 episode of the TV series Superboy, alongside Noel Neill, who played Lois Lane in Adventures of Superman, and an episode of Lois & Clark: The New Adventures of Superman as an aged Jimmy Olsen in the episode "Brutal Youth", first broadcast on October 20, 1996.

Larson had a cameo in a late-1990s American Express card commercial, The Adventures of Seinfeld & Superman. He and Neill provided commentary on several Adventures of Superman episodes for the January 2006 DVD release of the 1953 season, and in 2006, he appeared in Bryan Singer's film Superman Returns in a cameo role as "Bo the Bartender". Bo wore a bowtie, a trademark of Larson's depiction of Jimmy Olsen. Larson and Neill appeared together at the premiere of Superman Returns.

Larson appeared as a corporal in the first episode of the second season of Gomer Pyle - USMC in which the title character struggles to become a PFC. This was Larson's last television appearance in a series until a Law & Order: Special Victims Unit episode "Quickie", which aired on the NBC network on January 6, 2010.

He was interviewed extensively for the movie Making Montgomery Clift, in which he verified the claim of Clift's nephew (director Robert Anderson Clift) that Clift was not a dark, tragically depressed figure, but someone who loved life and the people who loved him in return.

Among his other work, Larson wrote the libretto to the opera Lord Byron to music by Virgil Thomson.

== Personal life ==
Larson was the life partner of director James Bridges from 1958 until Bridges' death on June 6, 1993. Prior to that, he was the companion of actor Montgomery Clift.

Larson owned and resided in the Frank Lloyd Wright–designed George Sturges House in the Brentwood section of Los Angeles, California, until his death.

He died on September 20, 2015, at the age of 87. His interment was at Rose Hills Memorial Park in Whittier, California.

== Filmography ==
=== Film ===
- 1948: Fighter Squadron – Lt. 'Shorty' Kirk
- 1949: Flame of Youth – Boy (uncredited)
- 1950: Redwood Forest Trail – Tommy (uncredited)
- 1950: Trial Without Jury – Dusty (uncredited)
- 1951: A Wonderful Life (short) – Richard Wood (age 16)
- 1951: Fighting Coast Guard – Newsboy (uncredited)
- 1951: On the Loose – Charleston Bit (uncredited)
- 1951: Starlift – Will (uncredited)
- 1952: Kid Monk Baroni – Angelo
- 1952: Belles on Their Toes – Packy Talbot (uncredited)
- 1952: Battle Zone – Cpl. James O'Doole
- 1952: Flat Top – "Scuttlebutt" Sailor
- 1953: Star of Texas – Henchman John Jenkins
- 1953: Three Sailors and a Girl – Sailor (uncredited)
- 1953: Man Crazy – Bob
- 1954: Stamp Day for Superman (Short) – Jimmy Olsen
- 1954: About Mrs. Leslie – Buddy Boyd
- 1957: Johnny Trouble – Eddie Landis
- 1981: Superman (1978 film) (Director's Cut) - Passenger on train
- 2006: Superman Returns – Bo the Bartender
- 2009: Bob's New Suit – Edward McIntyre
- 2016: Surge of Power: Revenge of the Sequel – Uncle Jimmy Williamson (Released posthumously, final film role)
- 2019: Making Montgomery Clift - Himself

=== Television ===
- 1952-1958: Adventures of Superman – Jimmy Olsen / Collins
- 1955: Navy Log – Gordon / Freddie / John Crawford / Herbie
- 1960: The Millionaire – Buzz
- 1965: Gomer Pyle, U.S.M.C. – Tommy
- 1991: Superboy – Lou Lamont
- 1996: Lois & Clark: The New Adventures of Superman – Old Jimmy Olsen
- 2002: Teamo Supremo - B. Barry Beryllium
- 2010: Law & Order: Special Victims Unit – Dewey Butler
