= Charles Casillo =

- Born: New York City, New York, U.S.
- Writing career
- Genres: Historical fiction, Literary fiction
- Subject: Biographies

Charles Casillo is an American author, screenwriter, and journalist known for his explorations of iconic Hollywood figures and complex human relationships.

== Life ==
Born in New York City, Casillo studied acting at the American Academy of Dramatic Arts and HB Studios, where he trained under Sandy Dennis. His early experiences in acting and the vibrant cultural scene of New York have significantly influenced his writing style and subject matter.

Casillo has authored biographies including Marilyn Monroe: The Private Life of a Public Icon (2018) and Elizabeth and Monty: The Untold Story of Their Intimate Friendship (2021). In these works, he delves into the personal lives of his subjects, offering readers an intimate look at their relationships and inner struggles. His biography Outlaw: The Lives and Careers of John Rechy examines the life of the groundbreaking gay writer and hustler.

In addition to biographies, Casillo has written fiction that often reflects his fascination with fame and its discontents. His novel The Marilyn Diaries (2014) is a fictional recreation of Marilyn Monroe's lost diaries, written in her imagined voice. Another novel, The Fame Game, explores the lives of three Hollywood hopefuls entangled in a web of ambition and deceit.

Casillo's journalism and creative writing have appeared The New York Times, The Los Angeles Times, New York Magazine, and The Los Angeles Review of Books. He has also contributed to documentaries about Marilyn Monroe, including Behind the Headlines: Marilyn and Her Men and Scandalous: The Death of Marilyn Monroe.

Currently, Casillo divides his time between New York, Los Angeles, and Palm Springs, continuing to write and engage with subjects that explore the complexities of fame, identity, and human connection.
