= Laurence Fishburne filmography =

Filmography

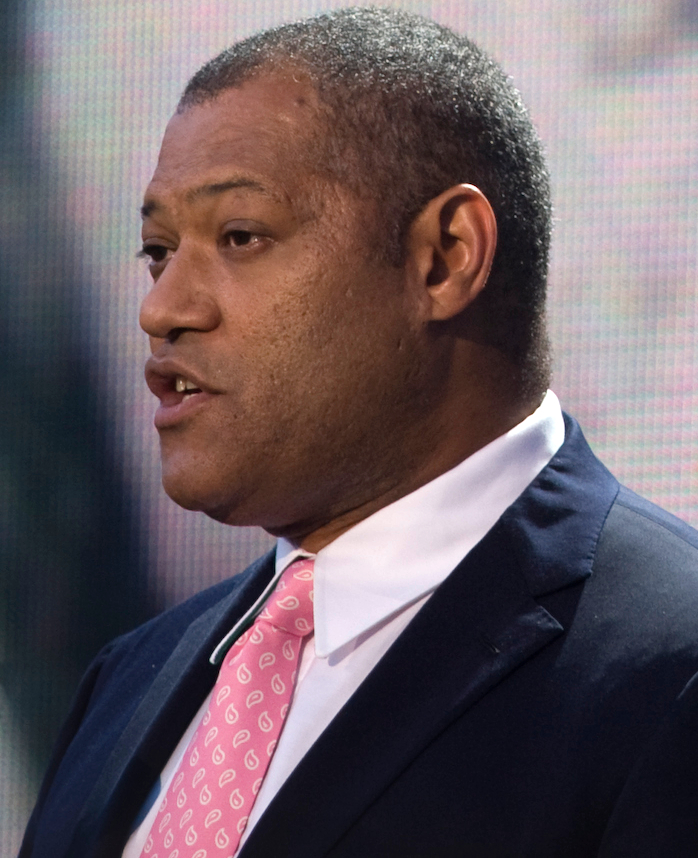
Fishburne in 2009

Here is a comprehensive list of Laurence Fishburne's stage, film, television, video game, music video, and audiobook credits.

== Stage ==
Year	Title	Role	Ref(s)
1976	Eden	Solomon Barton	
1980	Contributions	Ronald	
1985	Short Eyes	John "Ice" Wicker	
1988	Urban Blight	Performer	
1988	Loose Ends	Doug	
1992	Two Trains Running	Sterling Johnson	
1995	Riff Raff	Mike	
1999	The Lion in Winter	Henry II	
2006	Fences	Troy Maxson	
2006	Without Walls	Morocco	
2008	Thurgood	Thurgood Marshall	
2022	American Buffalo	Donny	
2024	Like They Do In the Movie	Himself	

== Film ==
Key
†	Denotes works that have not yet been released

Year	Title	Role	Notes	Ref(s)
1975	Cornbread, Earl and Me	Wilford Robinson	Credited as Laurence Fishburne III	
1979	Fast Break	Street Kid	Credited as Laurence Fishburne III	
1979	Apocalypse Now	Tyrone 'Mr. Clean' Miller	Credited as Larry Fishburne	
1980	Willie & Phil	Wilson	Credited as Laurence Fishburne III	
1982	Death Wish II	'Cutter'	Credited as Laurence Fishburne III	
1983	Rumble Fish	'Midget'	Credited as Larry Fishburne	
1984	The Cotton Club	'Bumpy' Rhodes	Credited as Larry Fishburne	
1985	The Color Purple	Swain	Credited as Larry Fishburne	
1986	Quicksilver	'Voodoo'	Credited as Larry Fishburne	
1986	Band of the Hand	'Cream'	Credited as Larry Fishburne	
1987	A Nightmare on Elm Street 3: Dream Warriors	Max	Credited as Larry Fishburne	
1987	Gardens of Stone	Sergeant Flanagan	Credited as Larry Fishburne	
1988	Cherry 2000	Glu Glu Lawyer	Credited as Larry Fishburne	
1988	School Daze	Vaughn 'Dap' Dunlap	Credited as Larry Fishburne	
1988	Red Heat	Lieutenant Charlie Stobbs	Credited as Larry Fishburne	
1990	King of New York	Jimmy 'Jump'	Credited as Larry Fishburne	
1990	Cadence	Stokes	Credited as Larry Fishburne	
1991	Class Action	Nick Holbrook	Credited as Larry Fishburne	
1991	Boyz n the Hood	Jason 'Furious' Styles	Credited as Larry Fishburne	
1992	Deep Cover	Officer Russell Stevens Jr. / John Hull	Credited as Larry Fishburne	
1993	What's Love Got to Do with It	Ike Turner, Sr.		
1993	Searching for Bobby Fischer	Vinnie		
1995	Higher Learning	Professor Maurice Phipps		
1995	Bad Company	Nelson Crowe		
1995	Just Cause	Sheriff Tanny Brown		
1995	Othello	Othello		
1996	Fled	John Piper		
1997	Event Horizon	Captain Miller		
1997	Hoodlum	Bumpy Johnson	Also executive producer	
1998	Welcome to Hollywood	Himself		
1999	The Matrix	Morpheus		
2000	Michael Jordan to the Max	Narrator	Voice; Documentary	
2000	Once in the Life	20/20 Mike	Also director, writer and producer	
2001	Osmosis Jones	Thrax	Voice	
2003	Biker Boyz	Eric 'Smoke'		
2003	The Matrix Reloaded	Morpheus		
2003	Mystic River	Sergeant 'Whitey' Powers		
2003	The Matrix Revolutions	Morpheus		
2005	Assault on Precinct 13	Marion Bishop		
2005	Ashes and Snow	Narrator	Voice	
2005	Kiss Kiss Bang Bang	Bear in Genaros Beer Commercial	Voice cameo	
2006	Akeelah and the Bee	Dr. Larabee	Also producer	
2006	Mission: Impossible III	IMF Director Theodore Brassel		
2006	Five Fingers	Ahmat	Also producer	
2006	Bobby	Edward		
2007	TMNT	Narrator	Voice	
2007	The Death and Life of Bobby Z	Tad Gruzsa		
2007	Fantastic Four: Rise of the Silver Surfer	Norrin Radd / Silver Surfer	Voice	
2008	21	Cole Williams		
2008	Tortured	Archie Green		
2008	Days of Wrath	Mr. Stafford		
2009	Armored	Baines		
2009	Black Water Transit	Jack		
2010	Predators	Ronald Noland		
2010	Predators: Moments of Extraction	Ronald Noland	Voice; Short film	
2011	Contagion	Dr. Ellis Cheever		
2013	The Colony	Briggs		
2013	Man of Steel	Perry White		
2013	Khumba	Seko The Zebra	Voice	
2014	Ride Along	Omar		
2014	The Signal	Damon		
2014	Rudderless	Del		
2016	Standoff	Sade	Also executive producer	
2016	Batman v Superman: Dawn of Justice	Perry White		
2016	Passengers	Gus Mancuso		
2017	John Wick: Chapter 2	'The Bowery King'		
2017	Last Flag Flying	Reverend Richard Mueller		
2018	Ant-Man and the Wasp	Dr. Bill Foster		
2018	Imprisoned	Daniel Calvin		
2018	The Mule	Warren Lewis		
2019	John Wick: Chapter 3 – Parabellum	'The Bowery King'		
2019	Where'd You Go, Bernadette	Paul Jellinek		
2019	Running with the Devil	The Man		
2021	Under the Stadium Lights	Harold Christian		
2021	The Ice Road	Jim Goldenrod		
2022	All the Old Knives	Vick Wallinger		
2022	The School for Good and Evil	The School Master		
2023	John Wick: Chapter 4	'The Bowery King'		
2024	Megalopolis	Fundi Romaine		
2024	Slingshot	Captain Franks		
2024	Transformers One	Alpha Trion	Voice	
2024	Cellar Door	Emmett		
2025	The Astronaut	General William Harris	Also executive producer	
2025	Sneaks	The Collector	Voice; also producer	
2025	The Amateur	Robert Henderson		
2027	Gatto †	Rocco	Voice	
2027	The Exorcist: Martyrs †	Father Nichol	Post-production	

== Television ==
Year	Title	Role	Notes	Ref(s)
1972	If You Give a Dance, You Gotta Pay the Band	Fish	Television film	
1973–1976	One Life to Live	Josh Hall	Credited as Larry Fishburne	
1980	The Six O'Clock Follies	Robby Robinson	Credited as Larry Fishburne	
1980	A Rumor of War	Lightbulb	Credited as Larry Fishburne; Television film	
1981	Trapper John, M.D.	Hobie	Credited as Larry Fishburne; Episode: "Finders Keepers"	
1982	M*A*S*H	Corporal Dorsey	Credited as Larry Fishburne; Episode: "The Tooth Shall Set You Free"	
1982	Strike Force	F.T.	Credited as Larry Fishburne; Episode: "Humiliation"	
1982	I Take These Men	Hank Johnson	Credited as Larry Fishburne; Television film	
1983	For Us the Living: The Medgar Evers Story	Jimbo Collins	Credited as Larry Fishburne; Television film	
1986	Hill Street Blues	Maurice Haynes	Episode: "Look Homeward, Ninja"	
1986	Miami Vice	Prison Guard Keller	Credited as Larry Fishburne; Episode: "Walk-Alone"	
1986–1990	Pee-wee's Playhouse	Cowboy Curtis	17 episodes	
1987	Spenser: For Hire	David Mukende	Credited as Larry Fishburne; Episode: "Personal Demons"	
1989	The Equalizer	Casey Taylor	Episode: "Race Traitors"	
1990	Decoration Day	Michael Waring	Credited as Larry Fishburne; Television film	
1991	American Experience	Martin Delany	Voice; Episode: "The Massachusetts 54th Colored Infantry"	
1993	TriBeCa	Martin	Episode: "The Box"	
1995	The Tuskegee Airmen	Hannibal Lee	Television film	
1997	Miss Evers' Boys	Caleb Humphries	Television film; also producer	
1998	Always Outnumbered	Socrates Fortlow	Television film; also producer	
2008–2011	CSI: Crime Scene Investigation	Dr. Raymond Langston	Guest: Season 9 (episodes 9-10) Main: Seasons 9-11 (season 9, episodes 11-24) 60 episodes	
2009	CSI: Miami	Dr. Raymond Langston	Episode: "Bone Voyage"	
2009	CSI: NY	Dr. Raymond Langston	Episode: "Hammer Down"	
2011	Have a Little Faith	Henry Covington	Television film	
2013–2015	Hannibal	Jack Crawford	36 episodes	
2014–2022	Black-ish	Earl "Pops" Johnson	89 episodes; also executive producer	
2015	The Muppets	Himself	Episode: "Hostile Makeover"	
2016	Roots	Alex Haley	3 episodes	
2017	Madiba	Nelson Mandela	3 episodes	
2019–2022	Grown-ish	Earl "Pops" Johnson	3 episodes; also executive producer	
2019–2021	Mixed-ish	—N/a	Executive producer	
2020	#FreeRayshawn	Lt. Steven Poincy	15 episodes	
2020	Death to 2020	Narrator	Voice; Television special	
2020	History's Greatest Mysteries	Himself (host)	6 seasons 2020 to present	
2021	MacGruber	General Barrett Fasoose	7 episodes	
2021	Death to 2021	Narrator	Voice; Television special	
2023–2025	Moon Girl and Devil Dinosaur	Beyonder / Bill Foster	Voice, 19 episodes; also executive producer	
2023–2024	What If...?	Dr. Bill Foster / Goliath	Voice; 2 episodes	
2024	Clipped	Doc Rivers	6 episodes	
2025	The Witcher	Emiel Regis Rohellec Terzieff-Godefroy		

== Audio dramas ==
Year	Title	Voice role	Notes	Ref(s)
2017–2021	Bronzeville	Curtis Randolph	15 episodes	

== Video games ==
Year	Title	Voice role	Notes	Ref(s)
2003	Enter the Matrix	Morpheus		
2005	The Matrix Online	Morpheus		
2005	The Matrix: Path of Neo	Morpheus		
2005	True Crime: New York City	Isaiah Reed		
2009	CSI: Deadly Intent	Dr. Raymond Langston		
2010	CSI: Fatal Conspiracy	Dr. Raymond Langston		

== Music videos ==
Year	Song	Artist	Ref(s)
1983	"White Lines (Don't Do It)"	Grandmaster Flash and Melle Mel	
1985	"Attack Me with Your Love"	Cameo	
1986	"Growing Up"	Whodini	
1986	"Come to Me"	Robert Brookins	
2000	"Things I've Seen "	Spooks	

== Audiobooks ==
Year	Title	Voice role	Ref(s)
2020	The Autobiography of Malcolm X	Malcolm X	

== See also ==
- List of awards and nominations received by Laurence Fishburne
