= List of awards and nominations received by Laurence Fishburne =

Laurence Fishburne awards and nominations
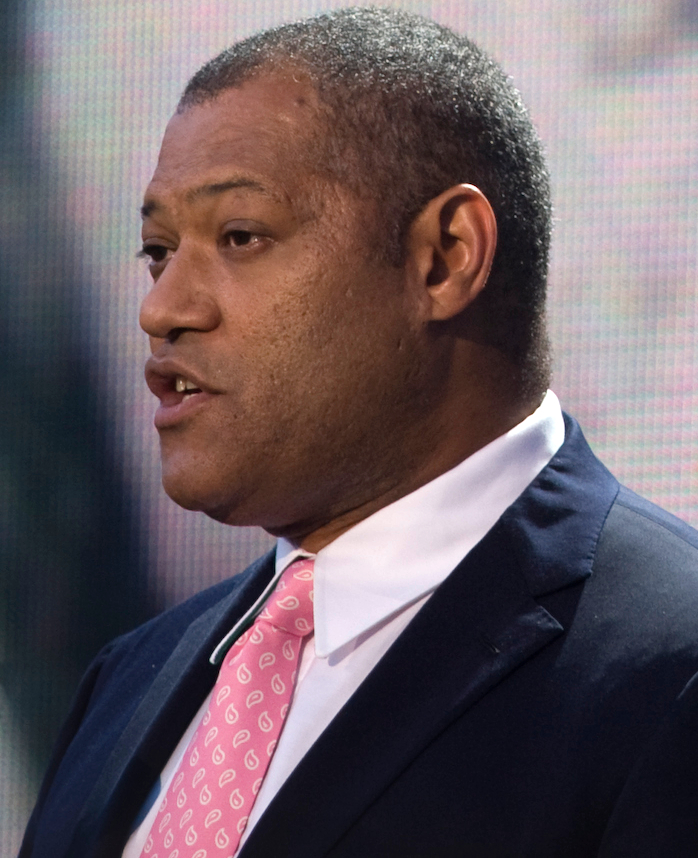
- Fishburne in 2009
Awards and nominations
Award	Wins	Nominations
Academy Awards	0	1
Actor Awards	0	5
Emmy Awards	6	16
Golden Globes	0	1
Tony Awards	1	2

Totals (Note: Certain award groups do not simply award one winner. They acknowledge several different recipients, have runners-up, and have third place. Since this is a specific recognition and is different from losing an award, runner-up mentions are considered wins in this award tally. For simplification and to avoid errors, each award in this list has been presumed to have had a prior nomination.)
- Wins: 5
- Nominations: 18

Laurence Fishburne is an American actor of the stage and screen. He has received various accolades including six Primetime Emmy Awards and a Tony Awards as well as nominations for an Academy Award, five Actor Awards, and a Golden Globe Award.

Fishburne earned acclaim for his role as a special agent in the thriller Deep Cover (1992) for which he was nominated for the Independent Spirit Award for Best Male Lead. The following year he portrayed Ike Turner in the drama film What's Love Got to Do with It (1993) for which he received a nomination for the Academy Award for Best Actor. He also acted in the Clint Eastwood drama Mystic River (2003) and the drama film Bobby (2006) for which he was nominated for the Actor Award for Outstanding Performance by a Cast in a Motion Picture.

On television, he portrayed a flight cadet in the HBO television film The Tuskegee Airmen (1995) for which he was nominated for the Primetime Emmy Award for Outstanding Lead Actor in a Limited or Anthology Series or Movie, the Golden Globe Award for Best Actor – Miniseries or Television Film and the Actor Award for Outstanding Performance by a Male Actor in a Miniseries or Television Movie. Fishburne has won the Primetime Emmy Award thrice for Outstanding Guest Actor in a Drama Series for TriBeCa (1993), Outstanding Made for Television Movie as a producer of Miss Evers' Boys (1997), and Outstanding Actor in a Short Form Comedy or Drama Series for #FreeRayshawn (2017).

On stage, he has received the Tony Award for Best Featured Actor in a Play for his role as a young man recently released from prison in the August Wilson play Two Trains Running (1992). He was Tony-nominated for his role as Thurgood Marshall in the play Thurgood (2008). He reprised his role in the 2011 film of the same name earning nominations for the Primetime Emmy Award for Outstanding Lead Actor in a Limited or Anthology Series or Movie and the Actor Award for Outstanding Performance by a Male Actor in a Miniseries or Television Movie.

== Major associations ==
=== Academy Award ===
Year	Category	Nominated work	Result	Ref.
1994	Best Actor in a Leading Role	What's Love Got to Do with It	Nominated	

=== Actor Awards ===
Year	Category	Nominated work	Result	Ref.
1996	Outstanding Lead Actor in a Miniseries or Movie	The Tuskegee Airmen	Nominated	
2004	Outstanding Ensemble Cast in a Motion Picture	Mystic River	Nominated	
2007	Outstanding Ensemble Cast in a Motion Picture	Bobby	Nominated	
2012	Outstanding Lead Actor in a Miniseries or Movie	Thurgood	Nominated	
2017	Outstanding Ensemble Cast in a Comedy Series	Black-ish	Nominated	
2018	Outstanding Ensemble Cast in a Comedy Series	Black-ish	Nominated	

=== Emmy Awards ===
Year	Category	Nominated work	Result	Ref.
Primetime Emmy Awards
1993	Outstanding Guest Actor in a Drama Series	TriBeCa: The Box	Won	
1996	Outstanding Lead Actor in a Miniseries or a Special	The Tuskegee Airmen	Nominated	
1997	Outstanding Lead Actor in a Miniseries or a Special	Miss Evers' Boys	Nominated	
1997	Outstanding Made for Television Movie	Miss Evers' Boys	Won	
2011	Outstanding Lead Actor in a Miniseries or Movie	Thurgood	Nominated	
2016	Outstanding Comedy Series	Black-ish	Nominated	
2016	Outstanding Narrator	Roots	Nominated	
2017	Outstanding Comedy Series	Black-ish	Nominated	
2018	Outstanding Comedy Series	Black-ish	Nominated	
2018	Outstanding Narrator	Year Million: Homo Sapien 2.0	Nominated	
2020	Outstanding Actor in a Short Form Series	#FreeRayshawn	Won	
Daytime Emmy Awards
2017	Outstanding Pre-School Children's Animated Program	The Snowy Day	Won	
Children's and Family Emmy Awards
2023	Outstanding Voice Performance in an Animated Program	Moon Girl and Devil Dinosaur	Nominated	
2023	Outstanding Animated Special	Moon Girl and Devil Dinosaur	Won	
2023	Outstanding Children's or Young Teen Animated Series	Moon Girl and Devil Dinosaur	Nominated	
2024	Outstanding Children's or Young Teen Animated Series	Moon Girl and Devil Dinosaur	Won	

=== Golden Globe Awards ===
Year	Category	Nominated work	Result	Ref.
1996	Best Actor in a Miniseries or Movie	The Tuskegee Airmen	Nominated	

=== Independent Spirit Awards ===
Year	Category	Nominated work	Result	Ref.
1992	Best Male Lead	Deep Cover	Nominated	

=== Tony Awards ===
Year	Category	Nominated work	Result	Ref.
1992	Best Featured Actor in a Play	Two Trains Running	Won	
2008	Best Actor in a Play	Thurgood	Nominated	

== Miscellaneous awards ==
=== Saturn Awards ===
Year	Category	Nominated work	Result	Ref.
2000	Best Supporting Actor	The Matrix	Nominated	
2015	Best Supporting Actor on Television	Hannibal	Won	

=== Acapulco Black Film Festival ===
Year	Category	Nominated work	Result	Ref.
1997	Best Actor	Hoodlum	Nominated	

=== BET Awards ===
Year	Category	Nominated work	Result	Ref.
BET Film Awards
2004	Best Actor	The Matrix Reloaded; The Matrix Revolutions; Mystic River	Nominated	

=== Black Movie Awards ===
Year	Category	Nominated work	Result	Ref.
2006	Outstanding Motion Picture (Producer)	Akeelah and the Bee	Nominated	
2006	Outstanding Actor in a Supporting Role	Akeelah and the Bee	Won	

=== Black Reel Awards ===
Year	Category	Nominated work	Result	Ref.
2000	Best Actor	The Matrix	Nominated	
2007	Best Supporting Actor	Akeelah and the Bee	Nominated	
2007	Best Motion Picture (Producer)	Akeelah and the Bee	Nominated	

=== MTV Movie Awards ===
Year	Category	Nominated work	Result	Ref.
2000	Best Fight (shared with Keanu Reeves)	The Matrix	Won	
2000	Best On-Screen Duo (shared with Keanu Reeves)	The Matrix	Nominated	

=== NAACP Image Award ===
Year	Category	Nominated work	Result	Ref.
NAACP Film Award
1994	Outstanding Actor in a Motion Picture	What's Love Got to Do with It	Nominated	
1995	Outstanding Supporting Actor in a Motion Picture	Higher Learning	Won	
1996	Outstanding Actor in a Motion Picture	Othello	Nominated	
1998	Outstanding Actor in a Motion Picture	Hoodlum	Nominated	
2000	Outstanding Actor in a Motion Picture	The Matrix	Nominated	
2004	Outstanding Actor in a Motion Picture	The Matrix Revolutions	Nominated	
2006	Outstanding Actor in a Motion Picture	Assault on Precinct 13	Nominated	
2007	Outstanding Actor in a Motion Picture	Akeelah and the Bee	Nominated	
2012	Outstanding Actor in a Motion Picture	Contagion	Nominated	
NAACP Television Award
1996	Outstanding Lead Actor in a Television Movie or Mini-Series	The Tuskegee Airmen	Won	
1998	Outstanding Lead Actor in a Television Movie or Mini-Series	Miss Evers' Boys	Won	
1999	Outstanding Lead Actor in a Television Movie or Mini-Series	Always Outnumbered	Nominated	
2009	Outstanding Supporting Actor in a Drama Series	CSI: Crime Scene Investigation	Nominated	
2010	Outstanding Actor in a Drama Series	CSI: Crime Scene Investigation	Nominated	
2011	Outstanding Actor in a Drama Series	CSI: Crime Scene Investigation	Nominated	
2021	Outstanding Supporting Actor in a Comedy Series	Black-ish	Nominated	
2021	Outstanding Performance in a Short-Form Series	#FreeRayshawn	Won	
NAACP Theatre Awards
2005	Lifetime Achievement Award		Won	
2007	Best Male Lead – Equity	Without Walls	Won	

=== San Diego Film Festival ===
Year	Category	Nominated work	Result	Ref.
2019	Gregory Peck Award	Lifetime Achievement	Awarded	

=== Theatre World Award ===
Year	Category	Nominated work	Result	Ref.
1992	Theatre World Award	Two Trains Running	Won	
