= Langston Fishburne =

American actor and ballet dancer

- Born: February 29, 1988 (age 38); Brooklyn, New York City, U.S.
- Education: Boston University
- Occupations: Actor, dancer
- Years active: 2006–present
- Parents: Laurence Fishburne (father); Hajna O. Moss (mother)

Langston Fishburne (born February 29, 1988) is an American actor.

== Life and career ==
Fishburne is the son of actor Laurence Fishburne and his first wife Hajna O. Moss, a casting director. Langston studied ballet while in New York City and began attending Boston University. Langston entered acting himself and had a recurring role in the web series Vanessa & Jan on WIGS. He appeared in the 2018 film Ant-Man and the Wasp as a younger version of Bill Foster, with the older version played by his father.

== Filmography ==
=== Film ===
Year	Title	Role	Notes
2011	Have a Little Faith	Henry at 20	TV movie
2015	Tiny Ocean	Sembene	Short
2015	The Neverlands	Khalil	Short
2016	Roger	Roger Belmondo	Short
2017	Romeo and Juliet in Harlem	Tybalt	
2017	Exorcist Academy	Vinny	Short
2017	The Dunning Man	Jerrod	
2018	Bounce	Lee Brooks	Short
2018	Tantalum	-	TV movie
2018	Ant-Man and the Wasp	Young Bill Foster	
2018	Assassin Behind the Glass	Sean	
2018	Bear	Norman	Short
2019	Lillith	Professor Hardy	
2020	86 Melrose Avenue	Dwayne	
2020	Exorcist Academy	Vinny	Short
2021	Deadlock	Armen	Short
2022	Zodiac	Flynn	TV movie
2022	Discontinued	The Guide	
2023	If You Were the Last	NASA Administrator	

=== Music videos ===
Year	Title	Artist	Role
2017	Citizen Kane	Nightmares on Wax	Lead

=== Podcasts ===
Year	Title	Role	Episodes
2024	Safe Society	W	5 Episodes

=== Television ===
Year	Title	Role	Notes
2012	Vanessa & Jan	Malcolm	Recurring cast
2016	Family Time	Mr. Hobson	Episode: "Daddie Donnie"
2018	NCIS: New Orleans	Security Officer	Episode: "High Stakes"
2018	Claws	Federal Agent	Episode: "Crossroads"
2020	Made in Rhode Island	Anthony Rocco	Episode: "Pilot"
2021	Leverage: Redemption	Exec	Episode: "The Harry Wilson Job"

=== Theatre ===
Year	Show	Role	Theatre
2016	The Maltese Falcon (Live Read)	Wilmer	Los Angeles County Museum of Art
2024	Othello	Othello	Stan Hywet Hall and Gardens
