= Ant-Man and the Wasp =

2018 Marvel Studios film

- Theatrical release poster
- Directed by: Peyton Reed
- Written by: Chris McKenna; Erik Sommers; Paul Rudd; Andrew Barrer; Gabriel Ferrari
- Based on: Ant-Man by: Stan Lee; Larry Lieber; Jack Kirby
- Produced by: Kevin Feige; Stephen Broussard
- Starring: Paul Rudd; Evangeline Lilly; Michael Peña; Walton Goggins; Hannah John-Kamen; David Dastmalchian; Tip "T.I." Harris; Judy Greer; Bobby Cannavale; Randall Park; Abby Ryder Fortson; Michelle Pfeiffer; Laurence Fishburne; Michael Douglas
- Cinematography: Dante Spinotti
- Edited by: Dan Lebental; Craig Wood
- Music by: Christophe Beck
- Production company: Marvel Studios
- Distributed by: Walt Disney Studios Motion Pictures
- Release dates: June 25, 2018 (El Capitan Theatre); July 6, 2018 (United States)
- Running time: 118 minutes
- Country: United States
- Language: English
- Budget: $130–195 million
- Box office: $622.7 million

Ant-Man and the Wasp is a 2018 American superhero film based on Marvel Comics featuring the characters Scott Lang / Ant-Man and Hope Pym / Wasp. Produced by Marvel Studios and distributed by Walt Disney Studios Motion Pictures, it is the sequel to Ant-Man (2015) and the 20th film in the Marvel Cinematic Universe (MCU). The film was directed by Peyton Reed and written by the writing teams of Chris McKenna and Erik Sommers, and Paul Rudd, Andrew Barrer and Gabriel Ferrari. It stars Rudd as Lang and Evangeline Lilly as Hope van Dyne, alongside Michael Peña, Walton Goggins, Hannah John-Kamen, David Dastmalchian, Tip "T.I." Harris, Judy Greer, Bobby Cannavale, Randall Park, Abby Ryder Fortson, Michelle Pfeiffer, Laurence Fishburne, and Michael Douglas. In the film, the titular pair work with Hank Pym (Douglas) to retrieve Janet van Dyne (Pfeiffer) from the Quantum Realm.

Talks for a sequel to Ant-Man began shortly after that film was released. Ant-Man and the Wasp was officially announced in October 2015, with Rudd and Lilly returning to reprise their roles. A month later, Ant-Man director Reed was officially set to return. He had joined the first film later in its production and was excited to develop this one from the beginning. He also looked forward to introducing Hope van Dyne as the Wasp in this film, and insisted on treating Lang and her as equals. Filming took place from August to November 2017, at Pinewood Atlanta Studios in Fayette County, Georgia, as well as Metro Atlanta; San Francisco; Savannah, Georgia; and Hawaii.

Ant-Man and the Wasp had its world premiere in Hollywood, Los Angeles, on June 25, 2018, and was released in the United States on July 6, 2018, as part of Phase Three of the MCU. The film was a critical and commercial success, receiving praise for its performances (particularly those of Rudd and Lilly), humor, and levity, and grossing over $622 million worldwide. A sequel, Ant-Man and the Wasp: Quantumania, was released in February 2023.

== Plot ==
Two years after Scott Lang was placed under house arrest due to his involvement with the Avengers, in violation of the Sokovia Accords, (Note: As depicted in Captain America: Civil War (2016)) Hank Pym and his daughter Hope van Dyne briefly manage to open a tunnel to the Quantum Realm. They believe Pym's wife, Janet van Dyne, might be trapped there after shrinking to sub-atomic levels in 1987. When he had previously visited the Quantum Realm, Lang had unknowingly become quantumly entangled with Janet, and now he receives an apparent message from her.

With only days left of house arrest, Lang contacts Pym about Janet, despite the strained relationship they have because of Lang's actions with the Avengers. Hope and Pym kidnap Lang, leaving a large ant with Lang's ankle-monitor on as a decoy so as not to arouse the suspicions of FBI agent Jimmy Woo. Believing the message from Janet is confirmation that she is alive, the trio work to build a stable quantum tunnel so they can take a vehicle to the Quantum Realm and retrieve her. They arrange to buy a part needed for the tunnel from black-market dealer Sonny Burch, but Burch realizes the potential profit to be made from Pym's research and double-crosses them. Donning the Wasp outfit, Hope fights off Burch and his men until she is attacked by a quantumly unstable masked woman. Lang tries to help fight off the "ghost", but the woman escapes with Pym's lab, which has been shrunk down to the size of a suitcase.

Pym reluctantly takes Hope and Lang to visit his estranged former partner Bill Foster, who gives them a way to locate the lab. After they find it, the "ghost" captures the trio and reveals herself to be Ava Starr. Her father, Elihas, was another of Pym's former partners. Elihas and his wife died during an experiment that caused Ava's unstable state. Foster enters and reveals that Ava is dying and in constant pain as a result of her condition. They plan to cure her using Janet's quantum energy. Believing that this will kill Janet, Pym refuses to help them and escapes with Hope, Lang, and the lab.

Opening a stable version of the tunnel, Pym, Hope, and Lang are able to contact Janet, who gives them a precise location to find her but warns that they only have two hours before the unstable nature of the Quantum Realm separates them for a century. Using a truth serum, Burch learns the trio's location from Lang's business partners Luis, Dave, and Kurt, and informs a contact at the FBI. Luis warns Lang, who rushes home before Woo can see that he is violating his house arrest. Pym and Hope are arrested by the FBI, allowing Ava to take the lab.

Lang is soon able to help Pym and Hope escape custody, and they find the lab. Lang and Hope distract Ava while Pym enters the Quantum Realm to retrieve Janet, whom he finds alive. Meanwhile, Lang and Hope are confronted by Burch and his men, and following a lengthy chase across San Francisco, Ava regains control of the lab, allowing her to begin taking Janet's energy by force. Luis, Dave, and Kurt incapacitate Burch and his men so that Lang and Hope can stop Ava. Pym and Janet return safely from the Quantum Realm, and Janet voluntarily gives some of her energy to Ava to temporarily stabilize her. Lang returns home once again, in time for a now-suspicious Woo to release him at the end of his house arrest. Ava and Foster go into hiding while Burch and his men are arrested and confess due to being injected with Burch's truth serum.

In a mid-credits scene, Pym, Hope, and Janet send Lang into the Quantum Realm to harvest quantum energy in a plan to help Ava remain stable. Before they can retrieve Lang, the other three turn to dust. (Note: Due to the Blip which began at the end of Avengers: Infinity War (2018).)

== Cast ==
- Paul Rudd as Scott Lang / Ant-Man:
  A former petty criminal who acquired a suit that allows him to shrink or grow in scale while also increasing in strength. Following the events of the Marvel Cinematic Universe (MCU) film Captain America: Civil War (2016), in which Lang escapes from the Raft prison, director Peyton Reed said that "he's a fugitive in most of the first Ant-Man (2015) movie. He's just a bigger fugitive now." Rudd was interested in Lang being a regular person rather than "innately heroic or super", and to be driven by his desire to be a responsible parent.
- Evangeline Lilly as Hope van Dyne / Wasp:
  The daughter of Hank Pym and Janet van Dyne who is handed down a similar suit and the Wasp mantle from her mother. The writers were excited to be able to give the character a proper introduction as the Wasp, showing her "power set, how she fights, and what are the injustices that matter to her". Lilly felt the character receives "incredible satisfaction" from becoming the Wasp, "something that she has been waiting for her whole life, which is essentially an affirmation from her father." Her relationship with Lang is more complicated than in the first film, and includes anger towards his actions during Captain America: Civil War. Lilly felt it was important that Hope "be an extremely empathetic and compassionate person" and that she should "always push for feminine qualities to be apparent when she is dealing with situations." In her fight sequences, Lilly wanted to move away from the more masculine Muay Thai and MMA-style of fighting that she had learned for the first film, noting that Hope moves differently from a man, so her fights should have "elegance, grace and femininity" with "a signature style" young girls could enjoy and emulate. Lilly worked with the writers to help ensure that Hope was able to "represent a modern woman" without becoming the stereotype of a motherly figure. Madeleine McGraw portrays a young Hope van Dyne.
- Michael Peña as Luis:
  Lang's former cellmate and a member of his X-Con Security crew. There was less opportunity for Peña to improvise compared to the first film, where he and Rudd were still developing the character during filming. The creative team wanted to feature another scene of Luis "riffing a long story" as he did in the first film, but did not want to repeat themselves; they were able to take a different approach by giving the character truth serum in a scene for this film.
- Walton Goggins as Sonny Burch: A "low-level criminal-type" who wants Pym's technology to sell on the black market.
- Hannah John-Kamen as Ava Starr / Ghost:
  A woman with molecular instability, who can phase through objects; she is only considered a "villain" because her attempts at survival clash with the heroes' goals. The character is traditionally portrayed as male in the comics, but the creative team believed that the character's gender was irrelevant, and felt that casting a woman would be more interesting. It also allowed them to continue the fathers-and-daughters theme that embraced other characters in the film. Selected by Reed for the role after receiving an endorsement letter from Steven Spielberg who praised her work with him in the film Ready Player One (2018), John-Kamen enjoyed the "blank-slate" situation, which allowed her to make the character her own. Producer Stephen Broussard said that they wanted to cast a lesser-known actress to help maintain the mystery of the character, and John-Kamen "blew us away". RaeLynn Bratten portrays a young Ava Starr.
- David Dastmalchian as Kurt: A member of Lang's X-Con Security crew. Dastmalchian stated that the character's last name is Goreshter.
- Tip "T.I." Harris as Dave: A member of Lang's X-Con Security crew.
- Judy Greer as Maggie: Lang's former wife.
- Bobby Cannavale as Jim Paxton: A police officer, who is now Maggie's second husband and Cassie's stepfather.
- Randall Park as Jimmy Woo: An FBI agent and Lang's parole officer.
- Abby Ryder Fortson as Cassie: The daughter of Lang and Maggie.
- Michelle Pfeiffer as Janet van Dyne:
  Pym's wife, Hope's mother, and the original Wasp, who is lost in the Quantum Realm. Pfeiffer was Reed's dream casting for the role when he was working on the first film and he ensured that he received her input on the character. He noted that the character has spent 30 years in the quantum realm, so there is a question regarding how that has affected her. Producer Kevin Feige explained that the character ages over those 30 years, even though time works differently in the quantum realm, to avoid any "sci-fi weirdness" that could take away from the emotional reunions with Pym and Hope in the film. Michelle Pfeiffer was de-aged to portray young Janet van Dyne, with Hayley Lovitt acting as a reference double. Lovitt portrayed Janet in the first film, before Pfeiffer became involved with the franchise. Reed explained that Lovitt had been cast for the first film because of her "saucer-like, Michelle Pfeiffer eyes."
- Laurence Fishburne as Bill Foster:
  An old friend of Pym, who was once his assistant on Project Goliath. Fishburne approached Marvel about joining the MCU, pitching them a few ideas about whom he could portray, before Marvel offered him the role of Foster in this film. Fishburne had already played Perry White for the DC Extended Universe (DCEU), but he said that he had always fantasized about being in an MCU film, admitting that he considers himself a "Marvel [Comics] guy". Reed likened the rivalry between Foster and Pym to that of Steve Jobs and Bill Gates, and wanted an actor who could go "toe-to-toe" with Michael Douglas. Laurence Fishburne was de-aged to portray young Bill Foster, with Langston Fishburne, Laurence's son, acting as a reference double.
- Michael Douglas as Hank Pym:
  An entomologist, physicist, and former S.H.I.E.L.D. agent, who became the original Ant-Man after discovering the subatomic particles that make the transformation possible. Pym has grown a lot closer to his daughter Hope since the first film, and according to Feige, he has "that joy of fatherhood" in watching her become a superhero in her own right. Reed was attracted to the "morally dubious" decisions Pym sometimes makes. Douglas was de-aged to portray young Hank Pym, with Dax Griffin acting as a reference double, having done so for the first film as well.

Additionally, Stan Lee, co-creator of the titular heroes, has a cameo in the film as a man whose car is shrunk by accident. Michael Cerveris appears as Ava's father Elihas Starr, while Riann Steele plays his wife and Ava's mother Catherine. Tim Heidecker and Brian Huskey appear in cameos as a whale boat captain named Daniel Gooobler and a teacher at Cassie's school, respectively. Sonny Burch's team of men includes Divian Ladwa as Uzman, Goran Kostić as Anitolov, and Rob Archer as Knox, while Sean Kleier portrays Stoltz, Burch's FBI inside man and Jimmy Woo's subordinate. Tom Scharpling and Jon Wurster of The Best Show were planned to make brief appearances as Burch's SUV drivers, but their scene was ultimately cut.

== Production ==
=== Development ===
It's such a no-brainer that there needs to be female heroes ... In the '60s comics, the Janet van Dyne Wasp was clearly written by all men and was pretty one-dimensional. She's gotten much more dimensionalized since then. That's one of those things that I think is going to be really exciting [in this film].

— Director Peyton Reed on the Wasp's inclusion in the film

In June 2015, Ant-Man director Peyton Reed expressed interest in returning for a sequel or prequel to that film, saying that he had "really fallen in love with these characters" and felt "there's a lot of story to tell with Hank Pym". A month later, Pym actor Michael Douglas said he was not signed for any additional films, but "would look forward to more if it comes my way", and expressed the desire to have his wife Catherine Zeta-Jones cast as Janet van Dyne for a potential follow-up. Evangeline Lilly—who played the daughter of Pym and Van Dyne, Hope van Dyne—wanted to see Michelle Pfeiffer in the role. Producer Kevin Feige revealed that the studio had a "supercool idea" for the next Ant-Man film, and "if audiences want it, we'll find a place to do it." Reed also mentioned that there had been talks of making a standalone adventure with Hank Pym as Ant-Man, possibly including the original opening to Ant-Man featuring Jordi Mollà which was cut from the final film. Eric Eisenberg of CinemaBlend opined that a standalone adventure with Pym and the cut sequence would be a good candidate to revive the Marvel One-Shots short film series. By the end of July, David Dastmalchian expressed interest in returning for a sequel as Kurt.

In October 2015, Marvel Studios confirmed the sequel, titled Ant-Man and the Wasp, with a scheduled release date of July 6, 2018. Reed was in negotiations to direct the sequel by the end of the month, and announced his return in November, along with the confirmation of Paul Rudd and Lilly returning as Scott Lang / Ant-Man and Hope van Dyne / Wasp, respectively. Despite being offered the chance to direct sequels in the past, Reed had never done so out of a lack of interest, but was excited to work on Ant-Man and the Wasp because there was "a lot more story to tell with these characters that I have a genuine affection and kind of protective feeling about". He was also able to build the sequel "from the ground up", as he joined the first film late in the process following the departure of original writer and director Edgar Wright, and wanted to explore elements that he had set up in the first film. He first began work on an outline for the sequel, which he thought could be "weird, unique and different" now that the characters' origins had been established. On being the first MCU film to have a female character in the title with the Wasp, Reed called it "organic" and noted the Wasp's final line in Ant-Man—'It's about damn time'—as "very much about her specific character and arc in that movie, but it is absolutely about a larger thing. It's about damn time: We're going to have a fully realized, very very complicated hero in the next movie who happens to be a woman." Reed would push to ensure the Wasp received equal publicity and merchandise for the film, and wanted to explore the backstory of Janet van Dyne as well. He had "definite ideas" of who should portray that character. Reed said the alternate title Wasp and the Ant-Man was briefly considered, but was not chosen due to fan expectation given the comics history of the phrase "Ant-Man and the Wasp". That month, Adam McKay, one of the writers of Ant-Man, expressed interest in returning to write the film, and Douglas confirmed that he was in talks to return as well.

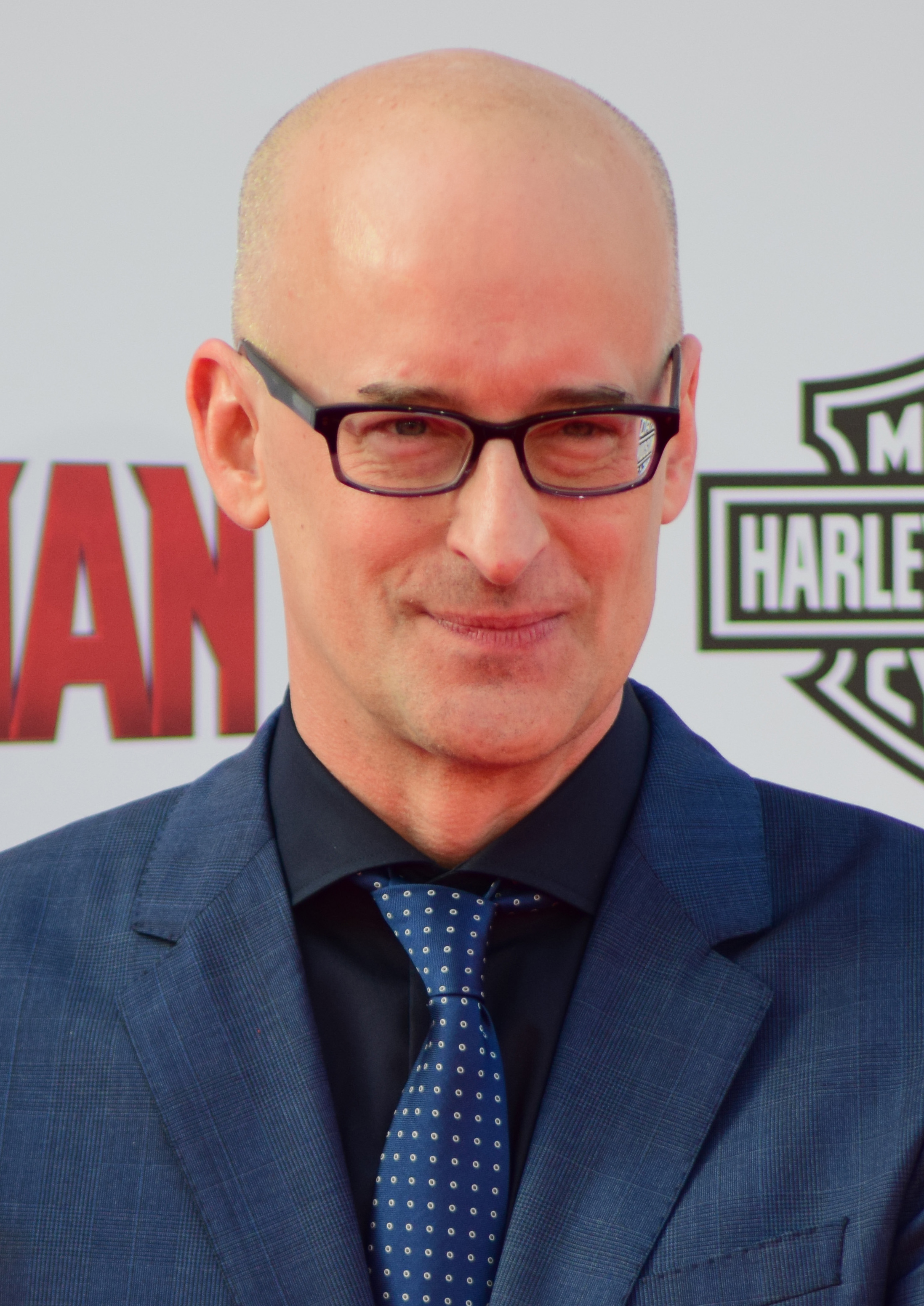
Director Peyton Reed was excited to develop the sequel from "the ground up" after joining the first Ant-Man late in the process.

Reed stated in early December that the film may "call back" to the heist film genre and tone of Ant-Man, but that Ant-Man and the Wasp would "have an entirely different genre template". He hoped to incorporate additional flashback sequences in the film, as well as explore Pym's various identities from the comics and his psychology. Reed also said he was "excited" about exploring and discovering the film version of the Ant-Man and Wasp relationship that is "a romantic partnership and a heroic partnership" in the comics, a "different dynamic than we've seen in the rest of the [MCU], an actual partnership." Additionally, Reed mentioned that pre-production would "probably" start in October 2016, with filming scheduled for early 2017. Production writers for the first film, Gabriel Ferrari and Andrew Barrer, signed on to write the script along with Rudd, with writing starting "in earnest" in January 2016. The next month, McKay stated that he would be involved with the film in some capacity. By April, the four writers and Reed had been "holed up in a room ... brainstorming the story", with Reed promising that it would have "stuff in it that you've never ever seen in a movie before". Feige added that they wanted to "stay true to what made [Ant-Man] so unique and different", and teased the potential of seeing the Giant-Man version of Lang that had been introduced in Captain America: Civil War (2016). Despite being "intimately involved in the writing and the development of the script", Reed did not take or receive a writing credit on the film.

In June 2016, Reed said that for inspiration from the comics he had been looking at "early Avengers stuff and all the way up to the Nick Spencer stuff now", and was focusing on iconic images that could be replicated in the film over story beats from the comics. He added that there was "definitely a chance" for Michael Peña, Tip "T.I." Harris, and Dastmalchian to reprise their respective roles as Luis, Dave, and Kurt from the first film. At San Diego Comic-Con 2016, Feige stated that Reed and Rudd were still working on the script, and that filming was now expected to begin in June 2017. Rudd elaborated that they had "turned in a treatment, but it's so preliminary. We'll see. We have an idea of what it might look like, but it could change a lot from where we're at now." The next month, Peña was confirmed to be returning as Luis, while filming was revealed to be taking place in Atlanta, Georgia. In early October, an initial script had been completed for the film that was awaiting approval from Marvel. Reed later revealed that early drafts of the script included a cameo appearance from Captain America, appearing during Luis' flashback sequences as he was recapping Lang's involvement in the airport battle in Civil War. However, the writers chose to remove the appearance in the final script since the events of Civil War were already referenced frequently in the film, and this instance "didn't feel organic to the story."

=== Pre-production ===
At the start of November 2016, Reed said that the film's production would transition from "the writing phase" to "official prep" that month, beginning with visual development. Reed reiterated his excitement for introducing the Wasp and "really designing her look, the way she moves, the power set, and figuring out, sort of, who Hope van Dyne is as a hero". Reed was inspired by the films After Hours (1985), Midnight Run (1988), and What's Up, Doc? (1972) for the look and feel of Ant-Man and the Wasp. While the first film was more of a heist film, Reed described this as part action film, part romantic comedy, and was inspired by the works of Elmore Leonard where there are "villains, but we also have antagonists, and we have these roadblocks to our heroes getting to where they need to be". He also stated his disappointment in the Giant-Man introduction happening in Civil War, rather than an Ant-Man film, but noted that the appearance provided character development opportunities between Lang, Pym, and Van Dyne since Pym is "very clear in the first movie about how he feels about Stark and how he feels about the Avengers and being very protective of this technology that he has", and so Reed thought Pym would be "pissed" and Van Dyne would feel betrayed, which was Reed's "in" for those characters' starting dynamics. Reed added that he spends "a lot of time" talking with the other writers and directors of MCU films, and that he and the writers on this film wished to maintain "our little Ant-Man corner of the universe. Because it's a whole different vibe tonally". Quantum physicist Spyridon Michalakis from the Institute for Quantum Information and Matter at the California Institute of Technology returned to consult on the film, after doing the same on Ant-Man, and explained the science behind getting extremely small to the filmmakers. Michalakis described the subatomic realm as "a place of infinite possibility, an alternative universe where the laws of physics and forces of nature as we know them haven't crystallized" and suggested it should be represented in the film by "beautiful colors changing constantly to reflect transience."

In February 2017, Douglas confirmed that he would reprise his role as Hank Pym in the film. During the Hollywood premiere of Guardians of the Galaxy Vol. 2 in April, Dastmalchian confirmed his return as Kurt, and a month later, Harris confirmed his return as Dave as well. Through that May, Marvel was meeting with several actresses for a "key role" in the sequel, with Hannah John-Kamen cast in the part at the beginning of June. The following month, Randall Park joined the cast as Jimmy Woo, and Walton Goggins was cast in an undisclosed role. At San Diego Comic-Con 2017, Park's casting was confirmed; John-Kamen and Goggins' roles were revealed to be Ghost and Sonny Burch, respectively; and the casting of Pfeiffer as Janet van Dyne and Laurence Fishburne as Bill Foster was announced. Judy Greer was confirmed to be reprising her role as Maggie from the previous film the following week. Louise Frogley served as costume designer on the film after doing so for Marvel's Spider-Man: Homecoming (2017), and worked with Ivo Coveney to create the superhero suits for the film. Based on designs by Andy Park, the suits are updated for the film from the 1960s-inspired designs used in the first Ant-Man to more modern designs. The Wasp suit included practical wings which were replaced with digital wings for when they are expanded and ready for flight.

The Russo brothers, directors of Avengers: Infinity War (2018) and Avengers: Endgame (2019), which were filming while Ant-Man and the Wasp was preparing to film, were in constant discussion with Reed in order to ensure story elements would line up between the films. Joe Russo added that Ant-Man and the Wasp would have "some [plot] elements that stitch in" closely with Avengers: Infinity War, more so than some of the other films leading up to the Avengers films. Reed knew Ant-Man and the Wasp would be "a fairly stand-alone movie but... could not ignore the events of Infinity War", with the biggest connection occurring in the film's mid-credit scene. Since the events of Ant-Man and the Wasp occur over 48 hours, the timeline in relation to Infinity War was "left purposefully ambiguous" with Reed noting there had been discussions of placing "little Easter eggs along the way, to start to reveal to the audience where the movie takes place in the timeline, [but t]hat felt not very fun to us and kind of obvious." Reed also liked how the film ends with closure and on a positive note "and then to BANG — give the audience a gut punch right after the main credits", with the sequence showing Hank Pym, Janet van Dyne, and Hope van Dyne disintegrating due to the Blip featured at the end of Avengers: Infinity War. The film also has a post-credit scene that shows the ant who doubled for Lang while under house arrest performing a drum solo.

=== Filming ===
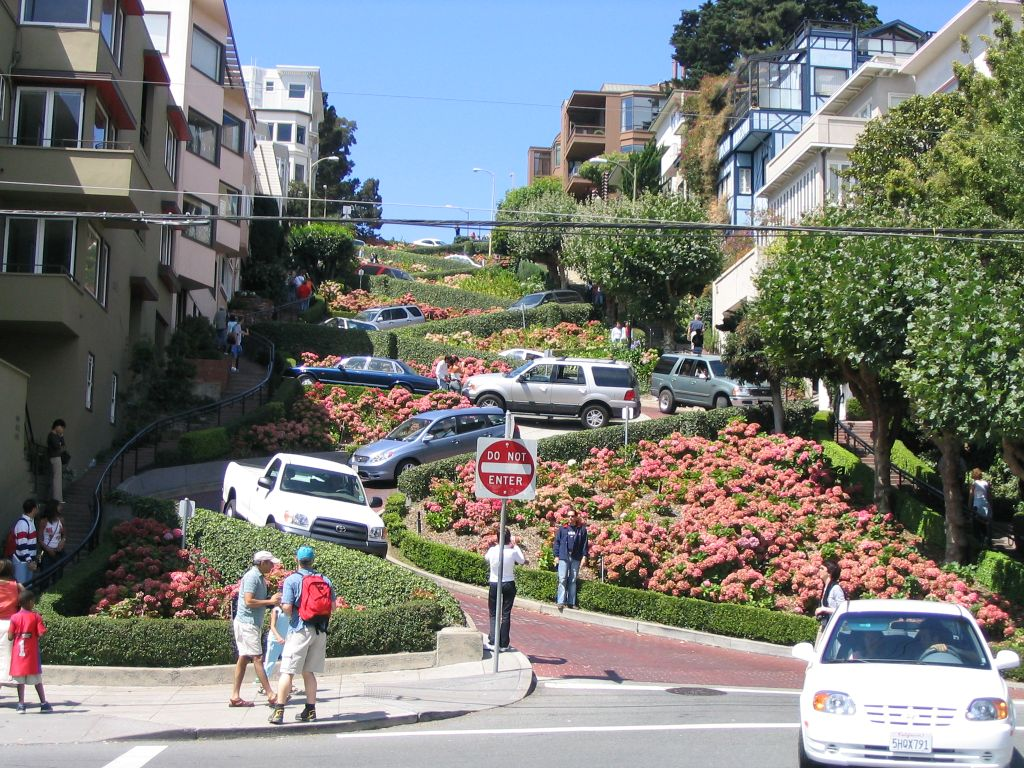
Additional filming took place in San Francisco, the setting of the film, including for an action sequence on Lombard Street (pictured).

Principal photography began on August 1, 2017, at Pinewood Atlanta Studios in Fayette County, Georgia, under the working title Cherry Blue; Dante Spinotti served as director of photography, shooting on Arri Alexa 65 cameras, with some sequences being shot with a Frazier lens. At the start of filming, Marvel revealed that Bobby Cannavale and Abby Ryder Fortson would also reprise their roles from the first film, respectively as Paxton and Cassie, and that Chris McKenna and Erik Sommers had contributed to the screenplay.

The film's lab and quantum tunnel set was inspired by the television series The Time Tunnel (1966–1967), and was the largest physical set built for an MCU film, which Reed jokingly said was "a little counter-intuitive". For the sequence where Janet van Dyne communicates through Lang, inspiration was taken from the film All of Me (1984) in which Lily Tomlin's character is trapped in the body of Steve Martin's character. There were discussions about having Pfeiffer perform the scene first to give Rudd an idea of how she would act, but the group ultimately decided to let Rudd invent the scene completely himself. For the chamber in Ghost's lair, the production team under production designer Shepherd Frankel wanted to create an environment that was unique to the MCU, and designed the chamber with Fresnel lenses to give it concentric-circle patterns that served a practical purpose for the film's story as well as differentiating the aesthetics of it from other sets and creating mystery about the character. The chamber is surrounded by "support shapes" to "create this feeling of desperation and yearning for family and stability". Douglas and Pfeiffer filmed flashback scenes of Pym and Van Dyne set in the 1980s for Ant-Man and the Wasp, but Reed decided to cut them because he felt it was unnecessary to include them in the final film, believing the plot should focus on the present rather than the past.

Filming also took place in Metro Atlanta, with filming locations including the Atlanta International School, the Midtown and Buckhead districts of Atlanta, and the Samuel M. Inman Middle School in the city's Virginia-Highland neighborhood; as well as Emory University and the Atlanta Motor Speedway in Hampton, Georgia. Additional filming took place in San Francisco in September 2017, in Savannah, Georgia in late October, and in Hawaii. Production wrapped on November 19, 2017.

=== Post-production ===
In late November, Lilly said that the characters would try to enter the Quantum Realm in the film, and their potential success would "open a whole entire new multi-verse to enter into and play around in" for the MCU. Patrick Burleigh and Eric Pearson, both members of Marvel's writers program, did uncredited work on the script ahead of the film's reshoots. Ant-Man and the Wasp includes a clip from the film Animal House (1978), which Reed was reminded of while discussing the quantum realm science for the film. Reed insisted that the film be shorter than two hours since it would be following the "massive epic" Infinity War and because it is "an action/comedy, and it didn't want to overstay its welcome". Dan Lebental and Craig Wood edited the film. The film's main credits sequence is a "table-top" version of its action sequences, and was created by Elastic. An alternative idea that had been considered was to create a "fake behind-the-scenes documentary" that would have made the film look like it was a 1950s-era Godzilla movie with "people in suits stomping on model cityscapes".

==== Visual effects ====
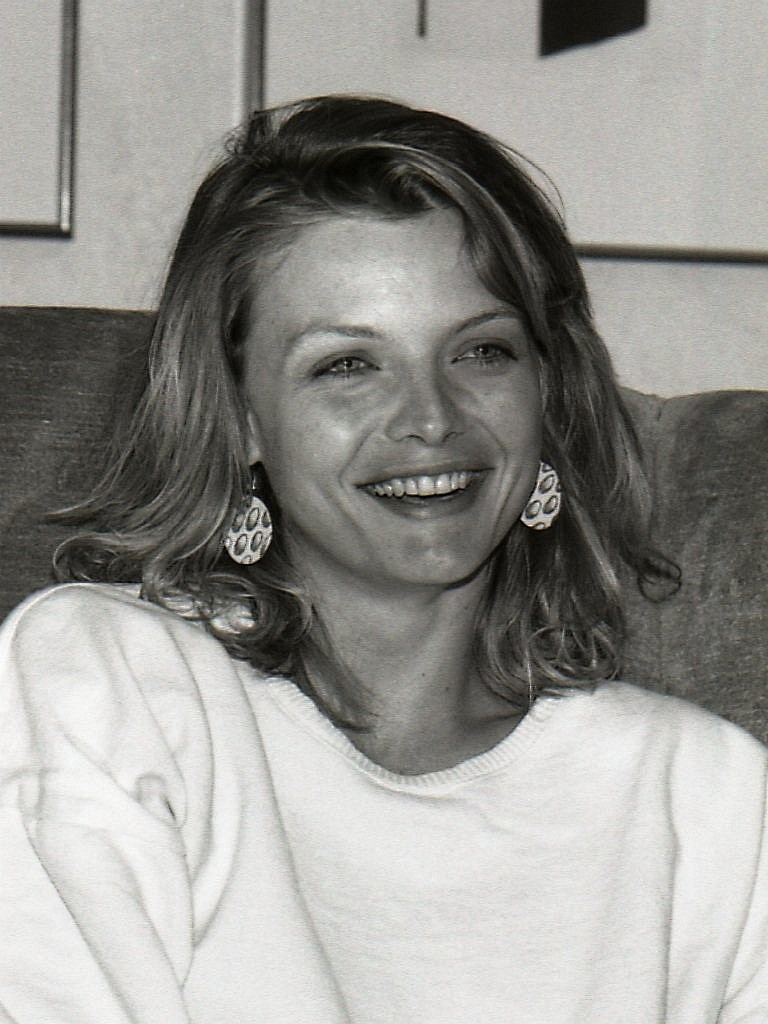
Michelle Pfeiffer was digitally de-aged in Ant-Man and the Wasp (top) to appear as she did circa 1985 (bottom).

Visual effects for the film were created by DNEG, Scanline VFX, Method Studios, Luma Pictures, Lola VFX, Industrial Light & Magic, Cinesite, Rise FX, Rodeo FX, Crafty Apes, Perception NYC, Digital Domain, and The Third Floor. DNEG worked on over 500 shots, including the effects for Ghost—which were shared with the other vendors—the third act chase sequence, and the final Ghost fight as Hank and Janet are returning from the quantum realm. For the "macro-photography" sequences in the film, DNEG took a different approach from their work in Ant-Man due to issues including trying to get a camera to seem small enough to capture the small actions. Though some of the film was shot with a Frazier lens that provides extra depth of field, DNEG would still need to "re-project the road higher and "raise the floor level" to simulate a tiny sized camera". As the third act chase sequence was mainly shot in Atlanta, while being set in San Francisco, DNEG VFX Supervisor Alessandro Ongaro noted it required "extensive environment work" with background elements in some shots not being salvageable at all. DNEG ultimately created 130 unique environments for the chase. Clear Angle aided DNEG with the Lidar surveying and photography of San Francisco, and were able to get their information for Lombard Street down to the millimeter resolution. DNEG also handled the stereo conversion on the film to release it in both 2.39:1 and 1.90:1 (for IMAX) aspect ratios. The squarer frame of the IMAX ratio was used as the basis for the visual effects, with the 2.39:1 version then being letterboxed from the finished IMAX version.

Lola once again worked on the de-aging sequences with Douglas, Pfeiffer, and Fishburne. The flashback sequences featuring a younger Hank Pym were set around the same time as the flashback sequences of Ant-Man, so Lola were able to use a similar process, referencing Douglas' appearance in the film Wall Street (1987) and having the actor on set in a different wardrobe and wig. Lola VFX Supervisor Trent Claus felt Pfeiffer's was less complicated, since "she has aged incredibly well" and still has big hair and a big smile. Pfeiffer's work from Ladyhawke (1985) and other films around that time was referenced. For Fishburne, his son served as his younger double, and helped inform Lola how the older Fishburne's skin would have looked in certain lighting situations. The films Lola looked to for Fishburne's younger self included Boyz n the Hood (1991) and Deep Cover (1992). Lola also made Fishburne thinner, and all actors had their posture adjusted.

Luma worked on the scenes where Ant-Man and the Wasp infiltrate Ghost's hideout, where they had to recreate the entire environment with CGI. They also created the first quantum tunnel sequence where Ghost receives her powers, and the flashback missile launch, which had to be replicated exactly from how it appeared in Ant-Man. The new version of the quantum realm, designed by Reed and production VFX supervisor Stephane Ceretti, was created by Method. Method Studios VFX Supervisor Andrew Hellen, explained, "We did a lot of research into macro and cellular level photography, and played with different ways to visualize quantum mechanics. It has a very magical quality, with a scientific edge. We also used glitching effects and macro lensing to ground the footage, and keep it from feeling too terrestrial." Method also worked on the sequence when Lang is the size of a preschooler, and created the digital doubles for Ant-Man and Wasp; Method used the same level of detail on the digital double suits regardless of what scale they were.

== Music ==
In June 2017, Reed confirmed that Christophe Beck, who composed the score for Ant-Man, would return for Ant-Man and the Wasp. Beck reprised his main theme from Ant-Man, and also wrote a new one for Wasp that he wanted to be "high energy" and show that she is more certain of her abilities than Lang. When choosing between these themes for specific scenes throughout the film, Beck tried to choose the Wasp theme more often so there would be "enough newness in the score to feel like it's going new places, and isn't just some retread." Hollywood Records and Marvel Music released the soundtrack album digitally on July 6, 2018.

== Marketing ==
Concept art and "pre-CGI video" for the film was shown at the 2017 San Diego Comic-Con. In January 2018, Hyundai Motor America announced that the 2019 Hyundai Veloster would play a significant role in the film, with other Hyundai vehicles also appearing. The first trailer for the film was released on January 30, 2018, on Good Morning America, and used the guitar riff from Adam and the Ants' "Ants Invasion". David Betancourt of The Washington Post called the release, the day after the widely praised Black Panther premiere, a "smart move"; with Black Panther and Avengers: Infinity War also releasing in 2018, "it can be easy [to] forget that hey, there is an Ant-Man sequel coming this year... So Marvel Studios giving us a quick reminder with this trailer release is logical". Tracy Brown, writing for the Los Angeles Times, praised how the trailer prominently featured Lilly's Van Dyne showing "she was always meant to be a superhero".

A second trailer was released on May 1, 2018, following a teaser video featuring the Infinity War cast asking "where were Ant-Man and The Wasp?" in that film. Graeme McMillan of The Hollywood Reporter felt the trailer made the film feel "very much like an intentional antidote for, or at least alternative to, the grimness of Infinity War's downbeat ending", calling it "a smart move" since it could be considered "a palate cleanser and proof that Marvel has more to offer... before audiences dive back into the core narrative with next year's Captain Marvel." In June 2018, Feige presented several scenes from the film at CineEurope. Ant-Man and The Wasp: Nano Battle!, an attraction inspired by the film, opened at Hong Kong Disneyland on March 31, 2019. It features Rudd and Lilly reprising their roles in clips that were made during the film's reshoots. Promotional partners for the film included Dell, Synchrony Financial, and Sprint. Disney spent around $154 million worldwide promoting the film.

== Release ==
=== Theatrical ===
Ant-Man and the Wasp had its world premiere at the El Capitan Theatre in Hollywood, Los Angeles, on June 25, 2018, and was released in the United States on July 6, 2018, where it opened in 4,206 theaters, of which 3,000 were in 3D, 403 were in IMAX, over 660 were in premium large format, and over 220 were in D-Box and 4DX. The film is part of Phase Three of the MCU.

The film was scheduled to be released in the United Kingdom on June 29, 2018, but was rescheduled in November 2017 to August 3, 2018, in order to avoid competition with the 2018 FIFA World Cup. Charles Gant of The Guardian and Screen International noted, "The worry for film distributors is that audiences will be caught up in the tournament. So it's easier to play safe and not date your film at this time, especially during the group stage, when all the qualifying nations are competing." Tom Butler of Yahoo! Movies UK added that, unlike the first film, which was one of the lowest-grossing MCU films in the UK, anticipation levels for the film "are at an all-time high following the events of Infinity War" and "UK audiences will probably have found out what happens in the film well before it opens in UK cinemas, and this could have a negative impact on its box office potential." Butler and Huw Fullerton of Radio Times both opined the delay could also be in part because of Disney also delaying the United Kingdom release of Incredibles 2 to July 13, 2018 (a month after its United States release), and not wanting to compete with itself with the two films. This in turn led fans in the country to start a Change.org petition to have Disney move the release date up several weeks, similarly to how Avengers: Infinity War's United States release was moved up a week the previous May.

=== Home media ===
Ant-Man and the Wasp was released on digital download by Walt Disney Studios Home Entertainment on October 2, 2018, and on Ultra HD Blu-ray, Blu-ray, and DVD on October 16. The digital and Blu-ray releases include behind-the-scenes featurettes, an introduction from Reed, deleted scenes, and gag reels. The digital release also features a look at the role concept art plays in bringing the various MCU films to life and a faux commercial for Online Close-Up Magic University. The IMAX Enhanced version of the film was made available on Disney+ beginning on November 12, 2021.

== Reception ==
=== Box office ===
Ant-Man and the Wasp grossed $216.6 million in the United States and Canada, and $406 million in other territories, for a worldwide total of $622.7 million. Following its opening, Deadline Hollywood estimated the film would turn a net profit of around $100 million. It became the eleventh-highest-grossing film of 2018.

Ant-Man and the Wasp earned $33.8 million on its opening day in the United States and Canada (including $11.5 million from Thursday night previews), and a total opening weekend of $75.8 million; this was a 33% improvement over the first film's debut of $57.2 million. Its opening included $6 million from IMAX screens. In its second weekend, the film earned $28.8 million, coming in second behind Hotel Transylvania 3: Summer Vacation, and in its third weekend grossed $16.1 million, coming in fourth. The film placed sixth in its fourth weekend, seventh in its fifth weekend, and tenth in its sixth weekend.

Outside the United States and Canada, the film earned $85 million from 41 markets, where it opened number one in all except New Zealand. Its South Korea opening was $20.9 million (which included previews). The $15.5 million opening from the market without previews was the second-best opening of 2018 behind Avengers: Infinity War. In its second weekend, playing in 44 markets, it remained number one in Australia, Hong Kong, South Korea, and Singapore. The film opened in France in its third weekend, earning $4.1 million, and opened in Germany in its fourth, where it was number one and earned $2.8 million, including previews. The next weekend saw Ant-Man and the Wasp open at number one (when including previews) in the United Kingdom, where it earned $6.5 million, and two weeks later, Italy opened number one with $2.7 million (including previews). In its eighth weekend, the film's $68 million opening in China was the fourth-best MCU opening in China and the third-highest Hollywood film opening of 2018. $7.2 million was from IMAX, which was the best August IMAX opening in China. The film opened in Japan the next weekend, earning $3.7 million, which was the top Western film for the weekend. As of September 9, 2018, the film's largest markets were China ($117.5 million), South Korea ($42.4 million), and the United Kingdom ($21.5 million).

=== Critical response ===
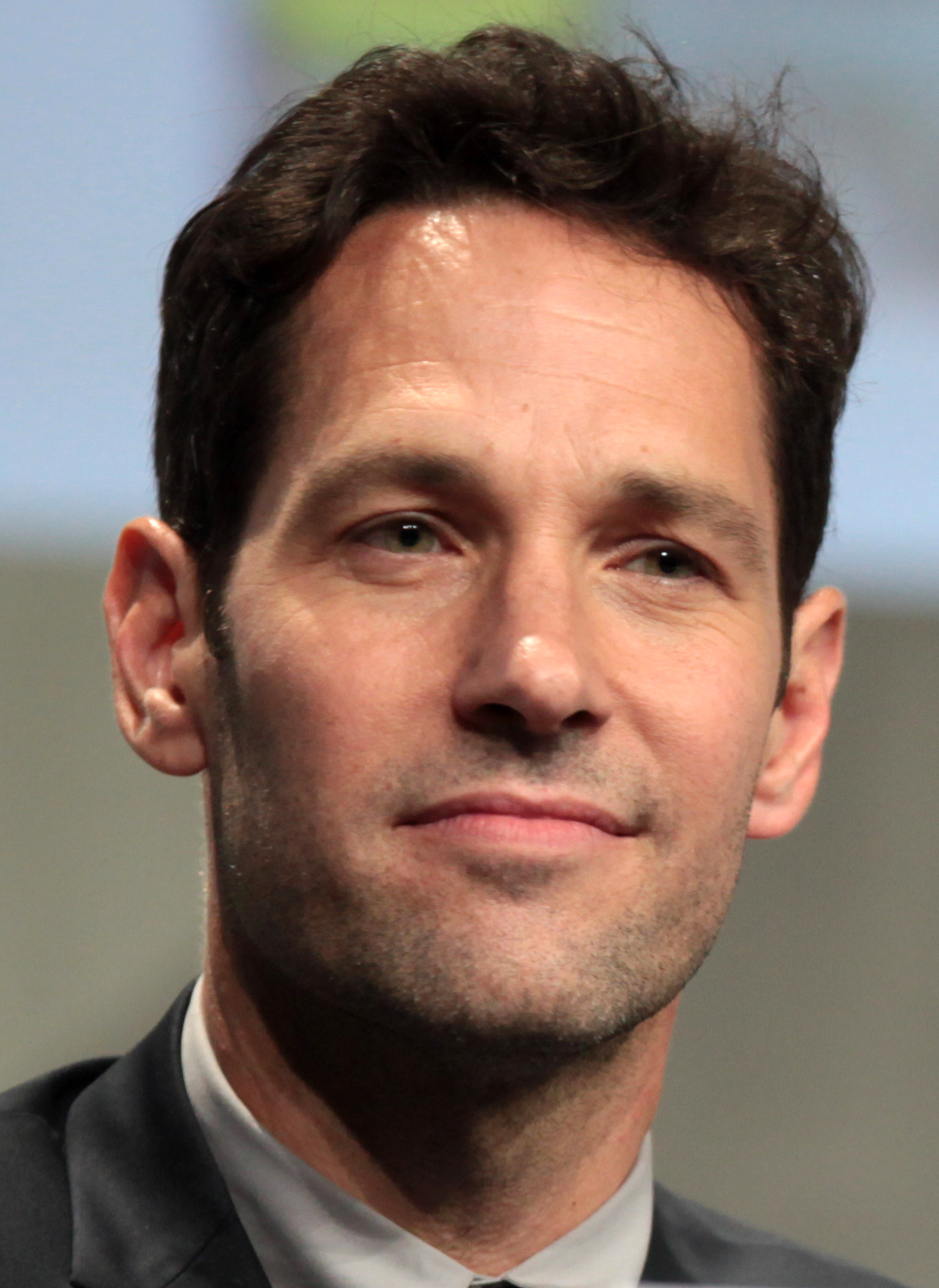
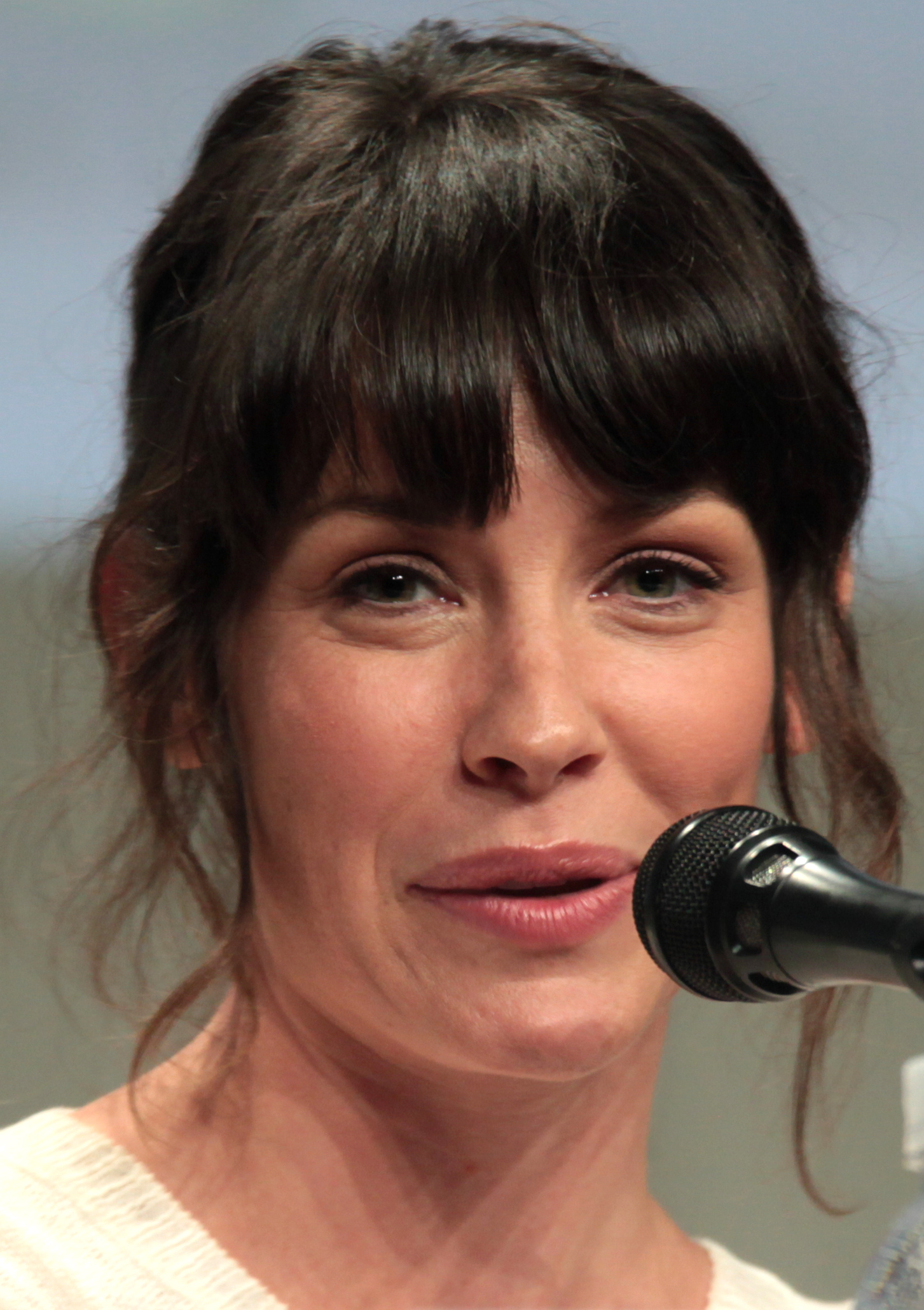
Paul Rudd (left) and Evangeline Lilly received praise from critics for their performances and chemistry in the film.

The review aggregator Rotten Tomatoes reported an approval rating of 87%, with an average score of 7/10, based on 445 reviews. The website's critical consensus reads, "A lighter, brighter superhero movie powered by the effortless charisma of Paul Rudd and Evangeline Lilly, Ant-Man and The Wasp offers a much-needed MCU palate cleanser." On Metacritic the film has a weighted average score of 70 out of 100, based on 56 critics, indicating "generally favorable" reviews. Audiences polled by CinemaScore gave the film an average grade of "A−" on an A+ to F scale, down from the "A" earned by the first film.

Peter Travers, writing for Rolling Stone, gave the film 3 out of 4 stars and praised Rudd and Lilly, saying, "The secret of Ant-Man and the Wasp is that it works best when it doesn't try so hard, when it lets charm trump excess and proves that less can be more even in the Marvel universe." Richard Roeper of the Chicago Sun-Times praised the lightweight tone as a treat and a breath following the "dramatically heavy conclusion" of Avengers: Infinity War. He also praised the cast, especially Rudd and Fortson, as well as the visual effects and inventive use of shrinking and growing in the action scenes. Manohla Dargis at The New York Times felt the film's "fast, bright and breezy" tone was a vast improvement over the first film, praising Reed's direction. She also praised Rudd, felt Lilly found "her groove" in the film, and wrote that the supporting cast all had "scene-steal[ing]" sequences. Simon Abrams of RogerEbert.com said the film was "good enough", a "messy, but satisfying" sequel that he felt managed to juggle its many subplots while giving Rudd's Lang some decent character development.

Variety's Owen Gleiberman called the film "faster, funnier, and more cunningly confident than the original," and felt Reed was able to give the film enough personality to overcome its two-hour runtime and effects-heavy climax. He did caution that this was "not quite the same thing as humanity. But it's enough to qualify as the miniature version." At The Washington Post, Ann Hornaday called the film "instantly forgettable" and criticized its plot, which she felt included some "filler" subplots, but found the film to be "no less enjoyable" because of this. She particularly praised Rudd along with the action and effects. Writing for The Boston Globe, Ty Burr called the film the perfect "summer air-conditioning movie", finding it fun, funny, superficial and an improvement over the first. He also wrote that the film had too many subplots and not enough of Pfeiffer, but was pleased with the lack of connection that the overall story had to the rest of the MCU, and with the focus on "pop trash" comedy. Stephanie Zacharek, writing for Time, said it was "hard to actively dislike" the film, which she thought had reasonably fun action and stand-out moments between Rudd and Fortson; but she was not as impressed with the larger, effects-heavy action sequences and felt the focus on Lilly as a better hero than Rudd was "just checking off boxes in the name of gender equality."

=== Accolades ===
Award	Date of ceremony	Category	Recipient(s)	Result	Ref.
Golden Trailer Awards	May 29, 2019	Best Home Ent Action	"Bonus Trailer" (Tiny Hero)	Nominated	
Golden Trailer Awards	May 29, 2019	Best Home Ent Fantasy Adventure	"Watch Me" (Trailer Park, Inc.)	Nominated	
Golden Trailer Awards	May 29, 2019	Best Fantasy Adventure TV Spot (for a Feature Film)	"War" (AV Squad)	Nominated	
Golden Trailer Awards	May 29, 2019	Best Voice Over TV Spot (for a Feature Film)	"War" (AV Squad)	Nominated	
Hollywood Music in Media Awards	November 14, 2018	Original Score – Sci-Fi/Fantasy/Horror Film	Christophe Beck	Nominated	
St. Louis Film Critics Association	December 16, 2018	Best Action Film	Ant-Man and the Wasp	Nominated	
Screen Actors Guild Awards	January 27, 2019	Outstanding Performance by a Stunt Ensemble in a Motion Picture	Ant-Man and the Wasp	Nominated	
Teen Choice Awards	August 11, 2019	Choice Action Movie	Ant-Man and the Wasp	Nominated	
Teen Choice Awards	August 11, 2019	Choice Action Movie Actor	Paul Rudd	Nominated	
Teen Choice Awards	August 11, 2019	Choice Action Movie Actress	Evangeline Lilly	Nominated	
Visual Effects Society Awards	February 5, 2019	Outstanding Created Environment in a Photoreal Feature	Florian Witzel, Harsh Mistri, Yuri Serizawa, Can Yuksel for "Journey to the Quantum Realm"	Nominated	

== Sequel ==
A sequel, Ant-Man and the Wasp: Quantumania, was released on February 17, 2023, with Reed returning to direct and Jeff Loveness writing the script. Rudd, Lilly, Douglas, and Pfeiffer reprise their roles, while Kathryn Newton takes over as Cassie Lang. Jonathan Majors joins as Kang the Conqueror.

== See also ==
- "What If... Zombies?!", an episode of the MCU television series What If...? that reimagines some events of this film
