= Laurence Fishburne =

American actor (born 1961)

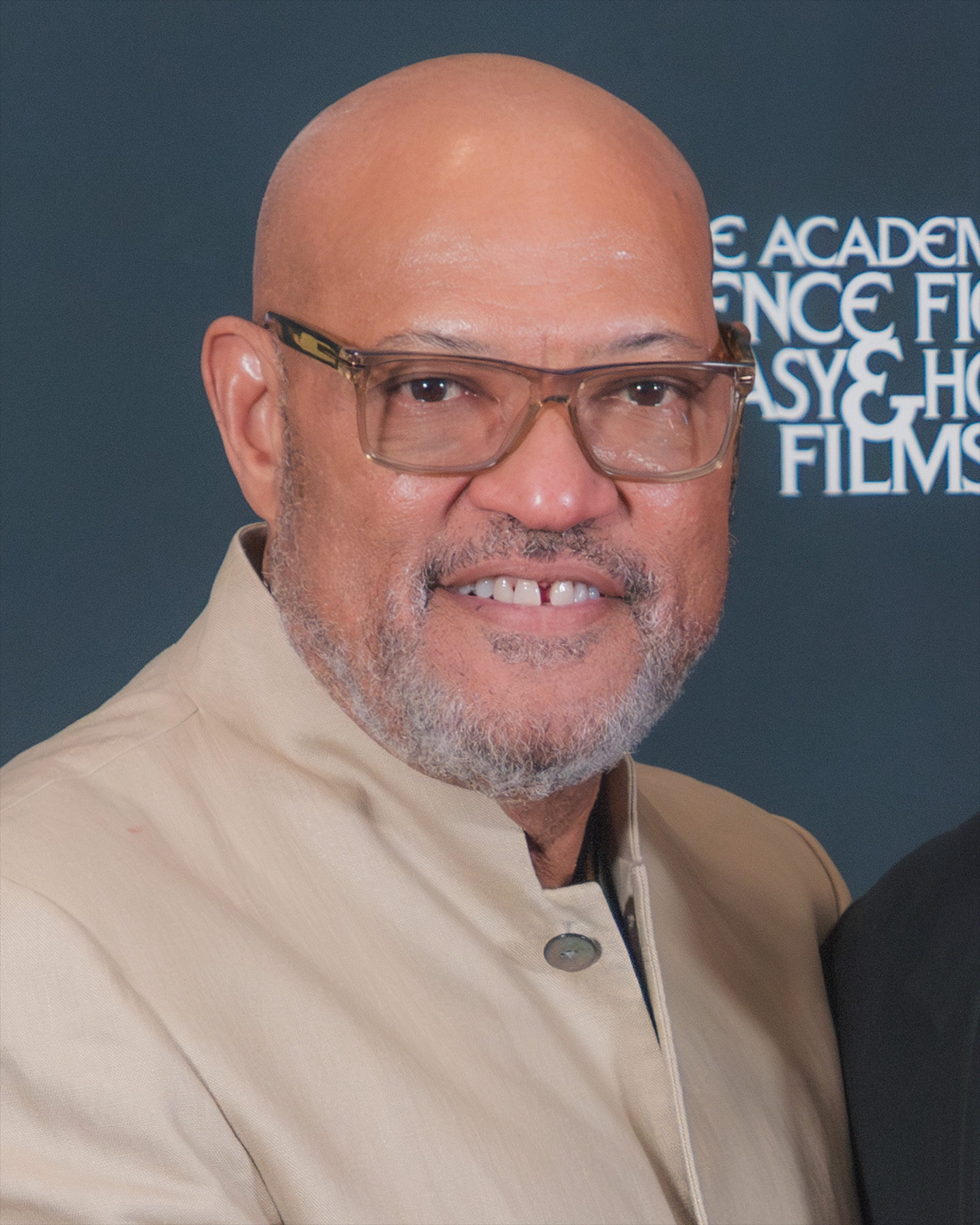
- Fishburne in March 2026
- Born: Laurence John Fishburne III; July 30, 1961 (age 65); Augusta, Georgia, U.S.
- Occupations: Actor; producer
- Years active: 1972–present
- Spouses: Hajna O. Moss (m. 1985, divorced) Gina Torres (m. 2002; div. 2018)
- Children: 3, including Langston Fishburne
- Awards: Full list

Laurence John Fishburne III (Note: Credited onscreen as Larry Fishburne until 1993) (born July 30, 1961) is an American actor. Throughout his career, he has gained recognition for his roles on stage and screen as militant and authoritative characters. Fishburne first came to prominence appearing in Apocalypse Now (1979) and achieved further recognition for his supporting role in Boyz n the Hood (1991). Later, he became known for portraying Morpheus in The Matrix trilogy (1999–2003) and the Bowery King in the John Wick film series (2017–).

For his portrayal of Ike Turner in What's Love Got to Do with It (1993), Fishburne was nominated for an Academy Award for Best Actor. He has also won six Emmy Awards for various television projects, and a Tony Award for Best Featured Actor in a Play for his performance in Two Trains Running (1992). He has also received nominations for a Golden Globe Award and five Screen Actors Guild Awards.

Other notable film credits include The Color Purple (1985), A Nightmare on Elm Street 3: Dream Warriors (1987), School Daze (1988), King of New York (1990), Deep Cover (1992), Searching for Bobby Fischer (1993), Higher Learning (1995), Event Horizon (1997), Mystic River (2003), Akeelah and the Bee (2006), Mission: Impossible III (2006), Predators (2010), Contagion (2011), Man of Steel (2013), Batman v Superman: Dawn of Justice (2016), Ant-Man and the Wasp (2018), and The Mule (2018). On television, he had a recurring role as Cowboy Curtis in Pee-wee's Playhouse (1986–1990), starred in the CBS crime drama CSI: Crime Scene Investigation (2008–2011), portrayed Jack Crawford in the NBC thriller series Hannibal (2013–2015), and played Earl "Pops" Johnson in the ABC sitcom Black-ish (2014–2022).

== Early life ==
Fishburne was born in Augusta, Georgia, raised as the son of Hattie Bell (née Crawford), a junior high school mathematics and science teacher, and Laurence John Fishburne, Jr., a juvenile corrections officer. After his parents divorced during his childhood, he moved with his mother to Brooklyn, New York, where he was raised. His father saw him once a month. Fishburne is a graduate of Lincoln Square Academy in New York, which closed in the 1980s.

In his 40s, Fishburne learned that Laurence John Fishburne, Jr. was not his biological father. In 2025, on an episode of Finding Your Roots, Fishburne learned that his biological father was a man named William Seigel Bohannan. Bohannan was a member of the U.S. military stationed at Fort Gordon when he met Fishburne's mother, who was a volunteer for the USO.

== Career ==
=== 1972–1989: Early career and stage work ===
For most of his early career, he was credited as Larry Fishburne. In 1972, at the age of 11, Fishburne received positive reviews for his first acting role in the initial ABC Theater teleplay If You Give a Dance You Gotta Pay the Band. Soon after, Fishburne portrayed Joshua Hall on the ABC soap opera One Life to Live. His most memorable childhood role was in Cornbread, Earl and Me, in which he played a young boy who witnessed the police shooting of a popular high school basketball star. He later earned a supporting role in Apocalypse Now, in which he played Tyrone Miller, a cocky 17-year-old Gunner's Mate 3rd Class from the Bronx, nicknamed Mr. Clean. When production began in March 1976, he was just 14 years old, having lied about his age to get the part. Filming took so long that he actually was 17 years old upon its completion.

Fishburne spent much of the 1980s in and out of television and periodically on stage. In the early 1980s, he worked as a bouncer at punk rock clubs, such as Cathay de Grande. He appeared in the early 1980s movies Band of the Hand, Death Wish 2 and The Cotton Club, and had a minor role in the critically acclaimed Steven Spielberg film The Color Purple. Fishburne had a recurring role as Cowboy Curtis on Paul Reubens' CBS children's television series Pee-wee's Playhouse. He also appeared in the M*A*S*H episode "The Tooth Shall Set You Free". In Spenser: For Hire, he was a guest star for the second-season episode "Personal Demons". He also appeared alongside Kevin Bacon in Quicksilver. His stage work during the 1980s included Short Eyes (1984), and Loose Ends (1987), both produced at Second Stage Theatre in New York City. Also in 1987 he played a part in the third A Nightmare on Elm Street film as a hospital orderly. Fishburne featured in Red Heat (1988) beside Arnold Schwarzenegger and James Belushi. Fishburne also starred as "Dap" in Spike Lee's School Daze (1988). Fishburne's character was a depiction of an African American, culturally inclined college student at a historically black college. In 1989, he guest starred on the CBS action drama series The Equalizer as Casey Taylor, with actress Aleta Mitchell as Casey's wife Martha, in the season four episode, "Race Traitors." The Taylors are being terrorized by Dale Stevens (played by David Andrews), who is a KKK member trying to organize neighborhood skinheads into a larger network.

=== 1990–2007: Established actor and worldwide recognition ===
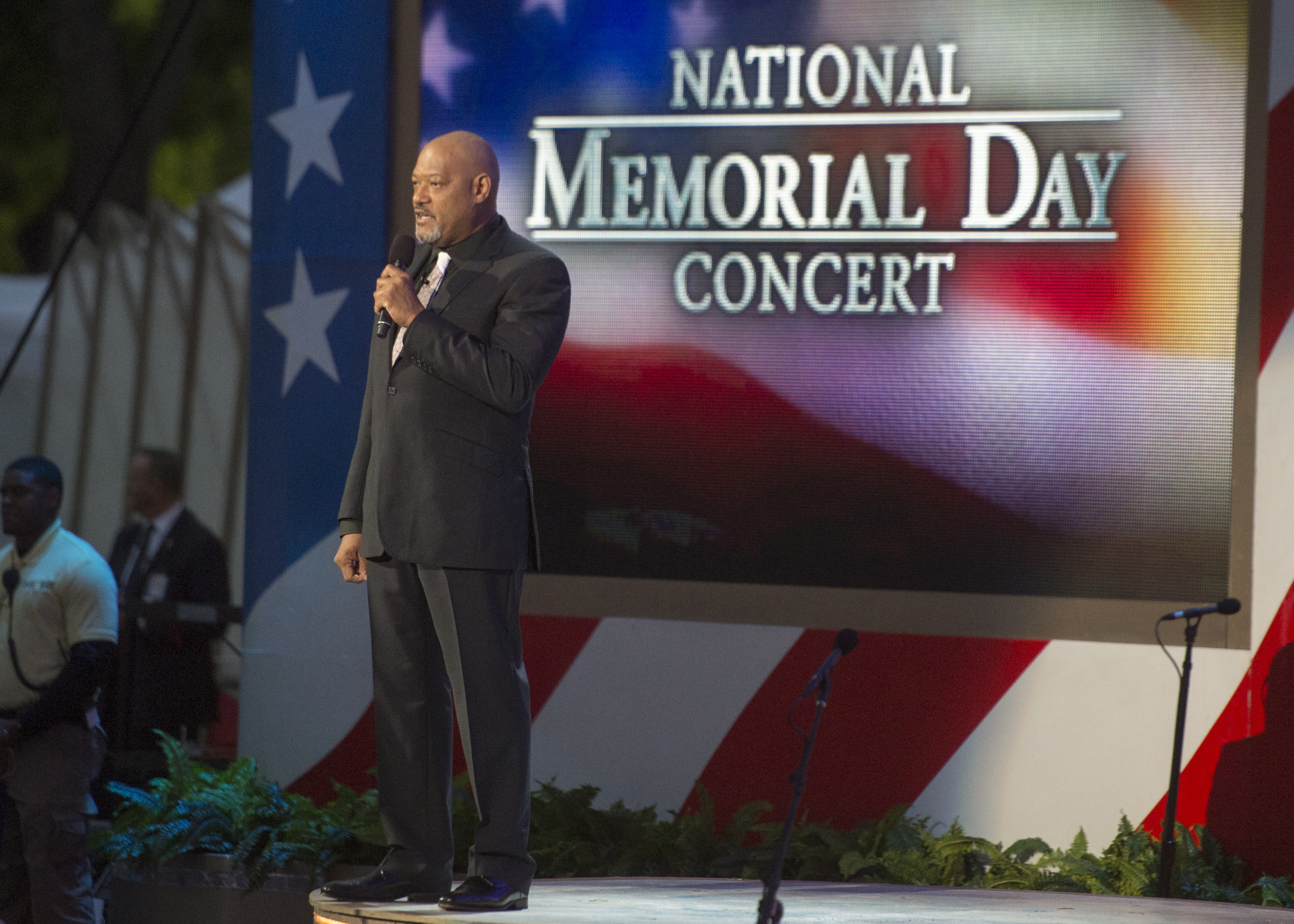
Fishburne at the National Memorial Day Concert in 2017

In 1990, Fishburne played Jimmy Jump in the controversial King of New York, and in 1991, starred in Boyz n the Hood. The following year, in 1992, he won a Tony Award for his stage performance in the August Wilson play Two Trains Running and an Emmy Award for his performance in the opening episode, "The Box", of the short-lived anthology series television drama TriBeCa. He also starred in Deep Cover alongside Jeff Goldblum. In 1993, he received his first Oscar nomination for his portrayal of Ike Turner in What's Love Got to Do With It. Fishburne won an Image Award for "Outstanding Supporting Actor in a Motion Picture" for his performance as West Indian Professor Maurice Phipps in the 1995 American drama ensemble film, Higher Learning. He played the title role in Othello, the second African-American actor, after Paul Robeson, to perform the role. In 1995, Fishburne wrote, directed, and starred in the play Riff-Raff at the now defunct Off-Broadway Circle Rep Theater. The cast included Titus Welliver and Heavy D, who performed a nine-minute live-rap on stage. In 1997, Fishburne starred in the science fiction horror Event Horizon alongside Sam Neill. Fishburne is perhaps best known for his role as Morpheus, the hacker-mentor of Neo, played by Keanu Reeves, in the 1999 blockbuster science fiction film The Matrix.

Fishburne provided the voice of Thrax in Osmosis Jones in 2001. He reprised his role as Morpheus in the Matrix sequels The Matrix Reloaded, and The Matrix Revolutions in 2003. He briefly featured as a stretcher-bearer in one version of the video for The Spooks' song "Things I've Seen" (2000) and appeared with Tom Cruise as Theodore Brassell, IMF superior of Cruise's character in Mission: Impossible III. Fishburne has worked with actress Angela Bassett on four projects. He said that "An electrifying thing happens when the two of us work together. I haven't experienced it with anyone else. A freedom happens when we work together." In 2006, they appeared onstage in a Pasadena Playhouse production of August Wilson's Fences. Fishburne also played a gay high school teacher in a Los Angeles production of Alfred Uhry's Without Walls in the same year. He played terrorist leader, Ahmat who was revealed to be CIA in the 2006 film Five Fingers.

He provided the voice of the narrator in the 2007 Teenage Mutant Ninja Turtles film, TMNT, which was a commercial success. The same year, he provided the voice of the Silver Surfer in 2007 film Fantastic Four: Rise of the Silver Surfer. On February 24, 2007, Fishburne was honored with the Harvard Foundation's Artist of the Year award at the annual show Cultural Rhythms. He received this honor for his achievements as an actor and entertainer and for his humanitarian pursuits. Fishburne is a UNICEF ambassador.

=== 2008–present: Continued acclaim and return to stage work ===
In April 2008, Fishburne returned to the stage in the Broadway production of Thurgood, a new play by George Stevens, Jr. Thurgood opened at the Booth Theatre on April 30, 2008. He won the Drama Desk Award for Outstanding One-Person Show for his performance. On February 24, 2011, HBO screened a filmed version of the play performed at the John F. Kennedy Center for the Performing Arts. On February 16, 2011, the White House hosted a screening of the film as part of its celebrations of Black History Month.

On August 18, 2008, it was reported that Laurence Fishburne would join the cast of CSI: Crime Scene Investigation after William Petersen, who played Gil Grissom, left the series. John Malkovich was also considered for the role prior to the announcement. Fishburne joined the show on the ninth episode of the 9th season as a college professor and former pathologist whose area of expertise involves some criminals' predisposition to commit acts of violence. The character was introduced as a consultant on a case ("19 Down"), who winds up joining the CSI team ("One to Go"). In May 2009, Fishburne performed on-stage in the National Memorial Day Concert on the Mall in Washington, D.C.

Fishburne starred in Predators in 2010 and Contagion in 2011. On June 7, 2011, Fishburne announced that he was leaving CSI to return to movies and theatre, opting not to renew his contract and would not appear in Season 12. Fishburne played Perry White in the Zack Snyder-directed Superman reboot Man of Steel (2013). In 2013, Fishburne joined the cast of Hannibal, as Dr. Jack Crawford, head of Behavioral Sciences at the FBI. In 2014, Fishburne reprised his role as Morpheus in a series of Kia K900 commercials. In 2015, Fishburne joined the ABC sitcom Black-ish in the recurring role of Pops; Fishburne is also an executive producer on the show. Fishburne also serves as an executive producer for the Freeform sitcom Grown-ish, a spin-off series to Black-ish.

In 2016, Fishburne reprised his role as White in the sequel Batman v Superman: Dawn of Justice and appeared in the science fiction/romance movie Passengers.

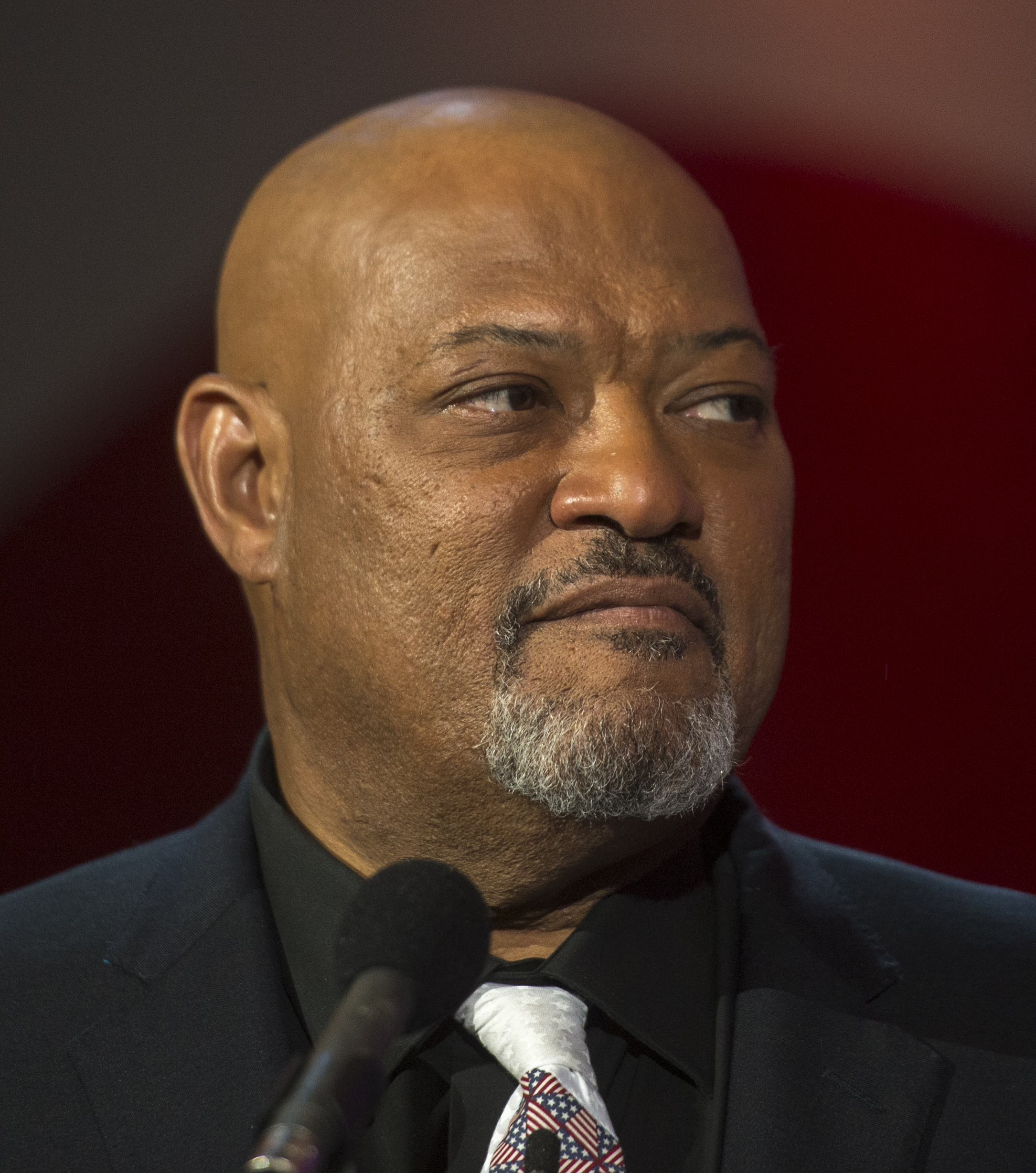
Fishburne in 2017

In June 2017, Fishburne's production company, Cinema Gypsy Productions, signed a two-year overall deal at ABC Studios.

In 2017, he appeared in the neo-noir action thriller film John Wick: Chapter 2 as The Bowery King, in his first collaboration with Keanu Reeves since The Matrix trilogy. Also in 2017, Fishburne starred in the comedy-drama Last Flag Flying, as the character Rev. Richard Mueller. In 2018, Fishburne played Bill Foster in Marvel's Ant-Man and the Wasp, directed by Peyton Reed. The film was released July 6. Fishburne served as co-creator and executive producer in the Marvel Animation/Disney Television Animation series Moon Girl and Devil Dinosaur. He also appeared in the series as the Beyonder and reprised his role as Bill Foster from Ant-Man and the Wasp.

In 2020, he narrated The Autobiography of Malcolm X, Audible's first-ever unabridged audiobook recording.

In January 2023, it was announced that Fishburne had been cast as Regis in the fourth season of The Witcher. He also starred in the American action spy espionage thriller, The Amateur, which was released in 2025.

== Personal life ==
Fishburne married actress Hajna O. Moss in 1985, in New York. They have two children, son Langston (b. 1987) and daughter Montana Fishburne (b. 1991). Hajna and Laurence divorced in the 1990s.

Fishburne dated actress Victoria Dillard from 1992 to 1995.

Fishburne and actress Gina Torres got engaged in February 2001 and got married on September 22, 2002, at the Cloisters, a museum in New York City. On January 8, 2007, Fishburne's spokesman Alan Nierob announced that the couple were expecting a child together. Their daughter, Delilah, was born in June 2007.

On September 20, 2017, it was confirmed that Torres and Fishburne were separated and had kept the separation private for the previous year. Fishburne filed for divorce on November 2, 2017; he and Torres reached a final settlement on April 16, 2018; and the divorce became effective May 11, 2018.

Fishburne lives in Hollywood, and also maintains a residence in New York City, in the Castle Village Co-Op in the Hudson Heights section of Washington Heights. He is a fan of Brazilian author Paulo Coelho; in 2009 he said he was planning to produce a movie based on Coelho's novel The Alchemist.

In a 2025 episode of Finding Your Roots, Fishburne found out he has a half-sister, Lisa Bohannan, and half-brother, William Bohannan.
