= Thurgood (play) =

One-man play by George Stevens, Jr.

- Original language: English
- Written by: George Stevens, Jr.
- Genre: Historical drama

Premiere
- Date: 2006
- Place: Westport Country Playhouse

Thurgood is a one-man play depicting the life and career of Thurgood Marshall. Written by George Stevens, Jr., the play premiered on Broadway in 2008. It was later adapted for television and broadcast on HBO, with Laurence Fishburne receiving nominations for both a Tony Award and a Primetime Emmy Award for his performance.

Screening of Thurgood at the White House (2:17)
Video commemorating Thurgood Marshall's life with the screening of Thurgood, a play starring Laurence Fishburne at the White House as part of Black History Month 2011. The Video discusses Marshall's life and legacy.

Screening of Thurgood at the White House
audio only version

== Synopsis ==
The one-man play follows Marshall from his childhood in Baltimore to his work as a U.S. Supreme Court Justice, which included arguing Brown v. Board of Education in 1954, and serving as the first African-American Supreme Court justice.

== Production history ==
The show premiered in 2006 at the Westport Country Playhouse, starring James Earl Jones and directed by Leonard Foglia.

The production featured Scenic Design by Allen Moyer, Costume Design by Jane Greenwood, Lighting Design by Brian Nason, Sound Design by Ryan Rumery and Projection Design by Elaine J. McCarthy.

The play then transferred to Broadway at the Booth Theatre on April 30, 2008, starring Laurence Fishburne.The production received positive reviews, with New York Times theatre critic Charles Isherwood calling it "surprisingly absorbing, at times even stirring" and "uplifting." For his role as Marshall, Fishburne was nominated for the 2008 Tony Award for Best Performance by a Leading Actor in a Play, along with winning a Drama Desk Award and Outer Critics Circle Award for solo performance. The production closed on August 17, 2008, after 126 performances and 19 previews.

On February 24, 2011, HBO screened a filmed version of the play which Fishburne had performed at the John F. Kennedy Center for the Performing Arts. The production was described by the Baltimore Sun as "one of the most frank, informed and searing discussions of race you will ever see on TV." On February 16, 2011, a screening of the film was hosted by the White House as part of its celebrations of Black History Month. Fishburne was nominated for a Primetime Emmy Award for his performance that same year.

== Awards and nominations ==
=== 2008 Broadway production ===
Year	Award	Category	Nominee	Result	Ref.
2008	Tony Award	Best Actor in a Play	Laurence Fishburne	Nominated	
2008	Drama Desk Award	Outstanding Solo Performance	Laurence Fishburne	Won	
2008	Outer Critics Circle Award	Outstanding Solo Performance	Laurence Fishburne	Won	
2008	Drama League Award	Distinguished Production of a Play		Nominated	

=== 2011 Film ===
Year	Award	Category	Nominee	Result	Ref.
2011	Primetime Emmy Award	Outstanding Lead Actor in a Miniseries or Movie	Laurence Fishburne	Nominated	
