= Deep Cover (1992 film) =

1992 film directed by Bill Duke

- Theatrical release poster
- Directed by: Bill Duke
- Screenplay by: Michael Tolkin; Henry Bean
- Story by: Michael Tolkin
- Produced by: Pierre David; Henry Bean
- Starring: Laurence Fishburne; Jeff Goldblum; Charles Martin Smith
- Cinematography: Bojan Bazelli
- Edited by: John Carter
- Music by: Michel Colombier
- Production company: Image Organization
- Distributed by: New Line Cinema
- Release date: April 15, 1992
- Running time: 108 minutes
- Country: United States
- Language: English
- Budget: $8 million
- Box office: $16.6 million

Deep Cover is a 1992 American neo-noir crime thriller film starring Laurence Fishburne as a Cincinnati cop who goes undercover for the Drug Enforcement Administration (DEA) to bring down a Los Angeles drug cartel. It was directed by Bill Duke based on a screenplay by Henry Bean and Michael Tolkin. Jeff Goldblum and Charles Martin Smith also feature.

Deep Cover was released in the United States on April 15, 1992, by New Line Cinema. The film received positive reviews, being likened by some critics to a modern film noir. It is also notable for its theme song of the same title, composed by Dr. Dre and released as his debut solo single, which also features then-newcomer Snoop Doggy Dogg making his studio debut.

== Plot ==
In 1972, Russell Stevens Jr. witnesses his drug-addicted, alcoholic father getting shot and killed while robbing a liquor store. Traumatized by his father's death, Stevens swears that he will never end up like him.

Nineteen years later, Stevens is a Cincinnati police officer. He is recruited by DEA Special Agent Gerald Carver to go undercover in Los Angeles, claiming that his criminal-like character traits will serve him better in this capacity than they would as a uniformed cop. Stevens poses as drug dealer "John Hull" in order to infiltrate and work his way up the network of the West Coast's largest drug importer, Anton Gallegos, and his uncle Hector Guzmán, a South American politician. John relocates to a cheap hotel and begins dealing cocaine.

One day, John is arrested by the devoutly religious LAPD Narcotics Detective Taft and his corrupt partner, Hernández, as he buys a kilogram in a set-up by Eddie Dudley, Gallegos's low-level street supplier. At his arraignment, John discovers that he bought baby laxative instead of cocaine and his case is dismissed. His self-appointed attorney David Jason, who is also a drug trafficker in Gallegos's network, rewards John's silence with more cocaine and introduces him to Felix Barbosa, the underboss to Gallegos. Felix kills Eddie when he finds out he's working with the LAPD and enlists John as his replacement.

John develops a romance with Betty McCutcheon, the manager of an art dealership which is a front to launder Jason's drug money. When one of John's dealers is murdered by a rival dealer, he is informed by Jason that if he doesn't retaliate, other street dealers will view it as a sign of weakness and in turn murder him. John follows the rival dealer to a nightclub, corners him in a bathroom and kills him. Jason then partners with John in his new business: distribution of a synthetic chemical variant of cocaine.

It is revealed that Felix is a confidential informant working with Hernández. After a falling out, Jason becomes more sadistic, and John correctly deduces that Felix wants Jason killed to eliminate his competition. Felix immediately gives up John, Jason and Betty to Hernández, and wants Jason killed during the arrest. Carver knows about this but refuses to interfere, forcing John to violate orders and stop the murder himself by exposing Felix, which results in a vengeful Jason killing him. The killing results in Betty reneging on the drug business, with John's protection.

Gallegos comes to meet with John and Jason, informing them that they have inherited Felix's debts to him. Later that day, John meets with Carver to tell him about his meeting with Gallegos. Instead, Carver pulls a gun on John and orders him to surrender his weapon and get in his car. Angrily, John disarms Carver and forces him to admit that the State Department has decided to leave Gallegos alone because Guzmán may someday be useful as a political asset to them; Carver has decided to play along in exchange for career advancement. Disillusioned, John abandons his undercover status and vows to take down Gallegos and Guzmán alone. While leaving the scene, he drops his lifelong vow not to imbibe himself and takes a drink from Carver's left-over flask with a snort of cocaine which he was previously transporting.

John and Jason learn that Gallegos is going to kill them anyway, so they kill him first and steal a van storing over $100 million in cash. They then invite Guzmán to a shipyard and offer to return 80% of Gallegos's money if he agrees to invest the remaining 20% in their synthetic cocaine operation. Taft, who has been tailing John, interrupts the deal and has his gun taken by Guzmán’s men. Since he is unable to arrest Guzmán because of his diplomatic immunity, Guzmán leaves.

Taft orders John to surrender but is shot by Jason after attempting to brandish his backup weapon, which throws John into an unexpected emotional anguish. The anguish forces John to reveal himself as a police officer when he tries to radio in for an ambulance to help the wounded Taft. John tries to reason with Jason as the latter tries to convince him to just take the money and go rogue. Jason shoots Taft in the chest, killing him. Throwing all reason out of the window and seeing no other alternative, John attempts to arrest Jason. When Jason shoots at him, a tearful John returns fire and kills Jason in self-defense as the cops arrive.

Afterward, Carver coerces Stevens into testifying in favor of him and the DEA in return for not charging Betty with money laundering. He produces a videotape of the incriminating conversation with Guzmán at the shipyard during his testimony to the House Judiciary Subcommittee, up-ending the State Department's intentions to collaborate with Guzmán, and derailing Carver's career. Later, he contemplates what to do with the $11 million of Gallegos's money he secretly kept.

== Cast ==
- Larry Fishburne (Note: Deep Cover is the last film in which Fishburne was credited as "Larry".) as DEA Agent Russell Stevens Jr. / John Hull
  - Cory Curtis as Young Russell Stevens Jr.
- Jeff Goldblum as David Jason
- Yvette Heyden as Nancy Jason
- Charles Martin Smith as DEA Agent Gerry Carver
- Victoria Dillard as Betty McCutcheon
- Gregory Sierra as Felix Barbosa
- David Weixelbaum as Chino
- Glynn Turman as Russell Stevens Sr.
- Arthur Mendoza as Anton Gallegos
- Clarence Williams III as Detective Taft
- Roger Guenveur Smith as Eddie
- James T. Morris as "Ivy"
- Alisa Christensen as Ivy's Driver
- Roberto Luis Santana as Dealer
- Kamala Lopez as Belinda Chacon
- Lira Angel as Bijoux
- Rene Assa as Hector Guzman
- Alex Colon as Molto
- Jaime Cardriche as "Shark"
- Sandra Gould as Mrs. G.
- Sydney Lassick as "Gopher"
- John Boyd West as "Caltech"
- Julio Oscar Mechoso as Detective Hernandez
- Paunita Nichols as Jacquiline
- Clifton Powell as Officer Leland
- Lionel Matthews as Officer Winston

Director Bill Duke makes an uncredited appearance in a photograph on a cork board displaying Gallegos's chain of command.

== Reception ==
Deep Cover was released on April 17, 1992 in 901 theaters, and grossed $3.4 million on its opening weekend. It went on to make $16.6 million in North America.

The majority of critics responded favorably towards Deep Cover. Film critic Roger Ebert gave the film three-and-a-half stars out of four and praised the voice-over narration as "poetic and colorful. That's part of the process elevating the story from the mundane to the mythic". Janet Maslin, in her review for The New York Times, praised the "quietly commanding Larry Fishburne and the wry Jeff Goldblum, who make an interestingly offbeat team". In his review for The Chicago Reader, Jonathan Rosenbaum wrote, "What emerges is a powerhouse thriller full of surprises, original touches, and rare political lucidity". Rolling Stone magazine's Peter Travers wrote, "Duke (A Rage in Harlem) makes the perks of the drug lifestyle palpably seductive. But this time there's something new in the snortscrew-slay formula: a working conscience".

Entertainment Weekly gave the film a "B−" rating and Owen Gleiberman wrote, "The movie peels away every layer of hope, revealing a red-hot core of nihilistic despair. Fishburne, with his hair-trigger line readings and deadly reptilian gaze, conveys the controlled desperation of someone watching his own faith unravel. And Goldblum reveals a new dimension of comic rottishness". In her review for The Independent, Sheila Johnston wrote: "The disappointment of Night and the City has left some critics lamenting that film noir is dead in the water, but Deep Cover displays many hallmarks of the genre, down to the diffuse paranoia (perhaps the entire operation is a high-level Washington cover-up). It was the most unexpected pleasure to arrive here in many a month". In its 2021 retrospective, The A.V. Club's Ignatiy Vishnevetsky wrote "As a depiction of crime, law enforcement, and drug dealing, the film is a cartoon; as an exploration of the Man's ulterior motives, it's trenchant and angry. Stylistic and attitudinal cues come by way of Miami Vice, anti-heroic Blaxploitation, and the politicized, independent-minded B-films of Samuel Fuller."

However, not all critics liked the movie. In his review for The Washington Post, Desson Howe wrote, "With Boyz n the Hood, Fishburne broke through to the big time. Here, his acting career takes a step backwards". Despite this, of Jeff Goldblum, Howe stated that "Oddly enough, Goldblum's so wildly out of place in this misbegotten movie, he becomes its greatest asset". Richard Harrington, also of The Washington Post, gave a mixed review, saying: "While Fishburne is generally riveting -- his facial disguise is basically hardness layered onto strength -- and Goldblum is intriguing -- his wannabe urges are quite curious -- the film itself is only occasionally visceral. On the one hand, it's refreshing and commendable that a major film casts a black actor not only as a detective (rather than as a criminal), but in the lead role."

On review aggregator website Rotten Tomatoes, the film holds an approval rating of 87% from 31 reviews, with an average rating of 6.9/10. The site's critics consensus reads, "Deep Cover rises above standard-issue crime thriller fare thanks to a smartly cynical script and powerhouse performances from its unorthodox but well-matched leads." Metacritic, which assigns a weighted average to critics' reviews, gave the film an average score of 67 out of 100 based on 25 critics, indicating "generally favorable" reviews.

== Soundtrack ==
The film's soundtrack, Deep Cover, was released by SOLAR Records and Epic Records on April 4, 1992. The album's title track introduced Snoop Doggy Dogg as a recording artist, who featured alongside Dr. Dre on the song. The album, containing a mix of hip-hop, reggae and R&B tracks, peaked at No. 166 on the Billboard 200 and No. 9 on the Top R&B/Hip-Hop Albums.

== Home media ==
Deep Cover made its home media debut via VHS on November 4, 1992. The DVD debuted on September 14, 1999 in a barebones snapper case with Dolby Digital 5.1 and 2.0 tracks for audio. The film was then released on Blu-ray Disc for the first time by the Criterion Collection on July 13, 2021, featuring a new 4K digitally restored transfer and lossless DTS HD MA 2.0 audio.

== Legacy ==
An audio sample from the film was used by The Future Sound of London to open the title track to their 1996 album Dead Cities.

== See also ==
- Laurence Fishburne filmography
- List of hood films
