= Jerry Lewis filmography =

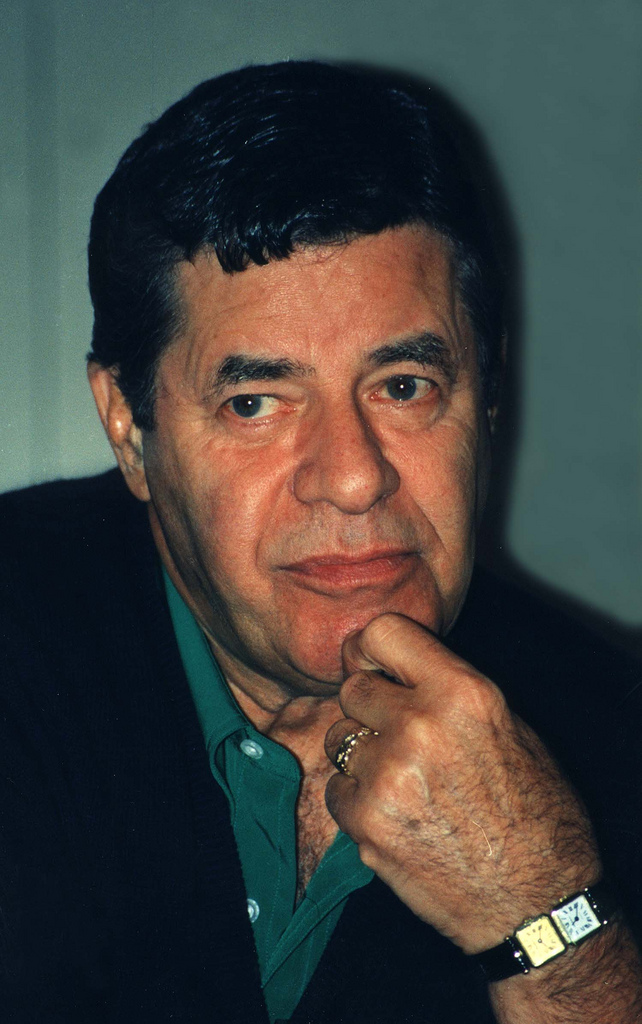
Lewis in 1995

Jerry Lewis appeared in movies and television from 1949 to 2017.

Lewis appeared in numerous films alongside singer Dean Martin. He also starred in such films as: The Bellboy (1960), Cinderfella (1960), The Errand Boy (1961), The Nutty Professor (1963), The King of Comedy (1982), Max Rose (2013) and The Trust (2016).

== Filmography ==
=== Martin and Lewis in film ===
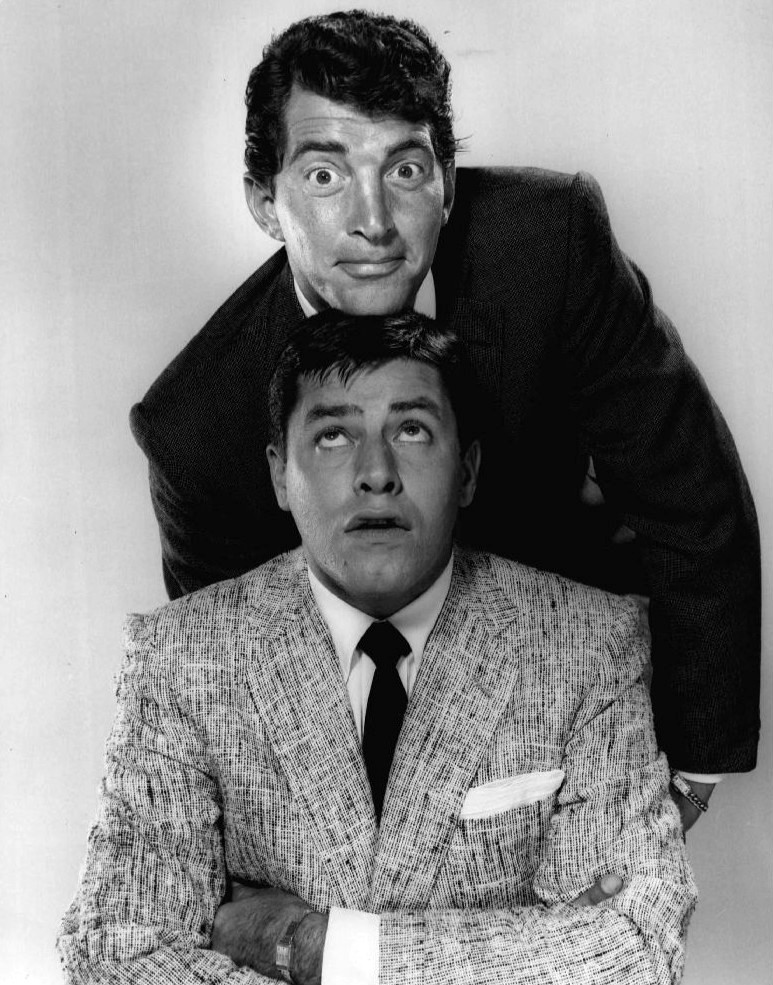
Martin and Lewis

Year	Title	Lewis role	Notes
1949	My Friend Irma	Seymour	
1950	My Friend Irma Goes West	Seymour	
1950	At War with the Army	PFC Alvin Korwin	
1951	That's My Boy	"Junior" Jackson	
1952	Sailor Beware	Melvin Jones	
1952	Jumping Jacks	Hap Smith	
1952	Road to Bali	"Woman" in Lala's Dream	Cameo
1952	The Stooge	Theodore Rogers	Also uncredited writer
1953	Scared Stiff	Myron Mertz	
1953	The Caddy	Harvey Miller, Jr.	
1953	Money from Home	Virgil Yokum	Filmed and originally released in 3-D
1954	Living It Up	Homer Flagg	
1954	3 Ring Circus	Jerome F. Hotchkiss	
1955	You're Never Too Young	Wilbur Hoolick	
1955	Artists and Models	Eugene Fullstack	
1956	Pardners	Wade Kingsley Sr/Wade Kingsley Jr.	
1956	Hollywood or Bust	Malcolm Smith	

=== Jerry Lewis in film ===
Year	Title	Role	Notes
1957	The Delicate Delinquent	Sidney L. Pythias	Also producer
1957	The Sad Sack	Private Meredith Bixby	
1958	Rock-A-Bye Baby	Clayton Poole	Also producer
1958	The Geisha Boy	Gilbert Wooley	Also producer
1959	Don't Give Up the Ship	John Paul Steckler I, IV and VII	
1959	Li'l Abner	Itchy McRabbit	Cameo
1960	Visit to a Small Planet	Kreton	
1960	The Bellboy	Stanley / Himself	Also director, writer and producer
1960	Cinderfella	Cinderfella	Also producer
1961	The Ladies Man	Herbert H. Heebert / Mama Heebert	Also director, writer and producer
1961	The Errand Boy	Morty S. Tashman	Also director and writer
1962	It's Only Money	Lester March	
1963	The Nutty Professor	Professor Julius Kelp / Buddy Love / Baby Kelp	Also director and writer. Selected for preservation in the United States National Film Registry by the Library of Congress as being "culturally, historically or aesthetically significant".
1963	It's a Mad, Mad, Mad, Mad World	Man Who Runs Over Hat	Cameo
1963	Who's Minding the Store?	Norman Phiffier	
1964	The Patsy	Stanley Belt / Singers of the Trio	Also director and writer
1964	The Disorderly Orderly	Jerome Littlefield	Also executive producer
1965	The Family Jewels	Willard Woodward / James Peyton / Everett Peyton / Julius Peyton / Capt. Eddie Peyton / Skylock Peyton / Bugsy Peyton	Also director, writer and producer
1965	Boeing Boeing	Robert Reed	Final film for Paramount
1966	Three on a Couch	Christopher Pride / Warren / Ringo Raintree / Rutherford / Heather	Also director and producer; first film for Columbia Pictures
1966	Way... Way Out	Pete Mattermore	20th Century Fox release
1967	The Big Mouth	Gerald Clamson / Syd Valentine	Also director and producer
1968	Don't Raise the Bridge, Lower the River	George Lester	
1969	Hook, Line & Sinker	Peter Ingersoll / Fred Dobbs	Also producer
1970	One More Time	Offscreen voice of the bandleader	Also director and producer
1970	Which Way to the Front?	Brendon Byers III	Also director and producer
1972	The Day the Clown Cried	Helmut Doork	Also director and writer; uncompleted/unreleased
1980	Hardly Working	Bo Hooper	Also director and writer
1982	Slapstick of Another Kind	Wilbur Swain / Caleb Swain	
1982	The King of Comedy	Jerry Langford	
1983	Cracking Up	Warren Nefron / Dr. Perks	Also director and writer. Filmed and previewed under the title Smorgasbord
1984	Retenez-Moi... Ou Je Fais Un Malheur	Jerry Logan	
1984	Par où t'es rentré ? On t'a pas vu sortir	Clovis Blaireau	
1987	Fight For Life	Dr. Bernard Abrams	Television film
1989	Cookie	Arnold Ross	
1992	Mr. Saturday Night	Himself	Cameo
1993	Arizona Dream	Leo Sweetie	
1995	Funny Bones	George Fawkes	
2008	The Nutty Professor	Professor Julius Kelp / Buddy Love (voice)	Direct-to-DVD
2009	Curious George 2: Follow That Monkey!	Humbleton Stationmaster (voice)	
2013	Max Rose	Max Rose	
2013	Até que a Sorte nos Separe 2	Bellboy	
2016	The Trust	Mr. Stone	

=== Television ===
Year	Title	Role	Notes
1948	Toast of the Town	Himself	With Dean Martin; June 20
1948	Texaco Star Theater	Himself	With Dean Martin; August 3
1948	Admiral Presents the Five Star Revue—Welcome Aboard	Himself	With Dean Martin; October 3, October 10 and October 17
1949	The Damon Runyon Memorial Fund Telethon	Himself	With Dean Martin; April 9
1949	Texaco Star Theater	Himself	With Dean Martin; October 18
1950	Saturday Night Revue	Himself	With Dean Martin; April 15
1950	Texaco Star Theater	Himself	With Dean Martin; June 13
1950–55	The Colgate Comedy Hour	Host	33 appearances (28 as Host) (Note: September 17, 1950; October 15, 1950; November 12, 1950; February 4, 1951; April 29, 1951; May 6, 1951 (guest); May 20, 1951; June 3, 1951; June 24, 1951; November 4, 1951; December 30, 1951; February 10, 1952; March 23, 1952; April 27, 1952; September 21, 1952; November 30, 1952; January 25, 1953; March 22, 1953; May 3, 1953; May 31, 1953; October 4, 1953; November 1, 1953 (guest); January 10, 1954; May 2, 1954; May 30, 1954; November 21, 1954 (guest); December 19, 1954; February 13, 1955; May 8, 1955; June 5, 1955; September 18, 1955; October 16, 1955 (guest); November 13, 1955) with Dean Martin
1952	Olympic Fund Telethon	Himself	With Dean Martin; June 21–22
1954	What's My Line?	Mystery Guest	Episode 191 with Dean Martin; January 24
1954	The Jack Benny Program	Himself	Episode: "Road to Nairobi" with Dean Martin; May 23
1954	Person to Person	Himself	With Dean Martin; July 2
1956	What's My Line?	Mystery Guest	Episode 320; July 22
1956	What's My Line?	Panelist	Episode 336; November 11
1957	The Jerry Lewis Show	Himself	Special; January 19
1957	The Jerry Lewis Show	Himself	Special; June 8
1957	The Jerry Lewis Show	Himself	Special; November 5
1958	The Jerry Lewis Show	Himself	Special; February 18
1958	The Jerry Lewis Show	Himself	Special; April 5
1958	The Jerry Lewis Show	Himself	Special; May 16
1958	The Eddie Fisher Show	Himself	Reunion with Dean Martin; September 30
1958	The Jerry Lewis Show	Himself	Special; October 18
1958	The Jerry Lewis Show	Himself	Special; December 10
1959	Startime	Joey Robin/Rabinowitz	Episode: "The Jazz Singer"; October 13
1960	Celebrity Golf	Himself	
1960	The Jerry Lewis Show	Himself	Special; January 16
1960	The Jerry Lewis Show	Himself	Special; April 15
1960	What's My Line?	Mystery Guest	Episode 522; July 17
1960	Permanent Waves	None	Unsold pilot, director only
1961	The Garry Moore Show		June 13
1961	What's My Line?	Panelist	Episode 578; August 27
1962	The Tonight Show	Guest host	10 episodes; June 25–July 6
1962	The Wacky World of Jerry Lewis	Himself	ABC Special; May 29
1962	What's My Line?	Mystery Guest	Episode 619; June 24
1963	The Jerry Lewis Show		13 episodes
1965	Ben Casey	Dr. Dennis Green	Episode: "A Little Fun to Match the Sorrow"; March 8
1965-1975	The Tonight Show Starring Johnny Carson	Guest Host	52 episodes
1965	The Andy Williams Show		
1965	Hullabaloo		With his son Gary Lewis
1965	Danny Thomas Presents The Wonderful World of Burlesque	Himself	NBC special; December 8
1966	Batman	Cameo	Episode: "The Bookworm Turns"'; April 20
1966	What's My Line?	Mystery Guest	Episode 818; June 19
1966	Password	Game Show Contestant/Celebrity Guest Star	
1966	Sheriff Who		NBC pilot (Unaired)
1966–2010	The Jerry Lewis MDA Labor Day Telethon	Host	
1967–69	The Jerry Lewis Show		
1968	Playboy After Dark		
1970	The Engelbert Humperdinck Show	Himself	March 4
1970	The Red Skelton Show	Magician's Assistant	Episode, "The Magic Act"; September 14
1970	The Klowns	Himself	NBC special; November 15
1970	The Bold Ones: The New Doctors	None	Directed episode "In Dreams They Run"; December 13
1971	The Carol Burnett Show		Episode 04.17; January 11
1971	The Kraft Music Hall	Himself	"The Friar's Roast: Jerry Lewis"; January 27
1972	Carosello	Himself	Italian television series
1973	The Dick Cavett Show	Himself	
1973	Klimbim	Himself	West German television series
1974	Celebrity Sportsman	Himself	
1978	Circus of the Stars	Ringmaster	December 8
1980	Rascal Dazzle	Narrator	HBO documentary on The Little Rascals
1983	Saturday Night Live	Host	
1984	The Jerry Lewis Show		5 episodes
1984	TV's Bloopers & Practical Jokes	Himself	Segment "Practical Joke: Jerry Lewis"
1985	Brothers	None	Directed the episode: "Donald's Dad"; June 13
1986	Comic Relief	Himself	HBO special; March 29
1987	Brothers	Himself	"Las Vegas Serenade: Part 2"; September 18
1988–89	Wiseguy	Eli Sternberg	5 episodes
1991	Good Grief	Himself	Episode: "The Bear"; January 6. Also directed
1993	Mad About You	Freddy Statler	Episode: "The Billionaire"; February 20
1999	Inside the Actors Studio		Episode 68; August 15
2003	The Simpsons	Professor John Frink Sr.	Episode: "Treehouse of Horror XIV"; November 2
2006	Law & Order: Special Victims Unit	Andrew Munch	Episode: "Uncle"; October 10
2010	Michel Legrand & Friends - 50 Years of Movies & Music		PBS Special; July 31
2011	Method to the Madness of Jerry Lewis	Himself	Documentary; also produced
2016	Der Clown	Himself	Interviewed for Eric Friedler's documentary on the making of The Day the Clown Cried; broadcast on German television channel Das Erste on 3 February 2016
2018	Comedians in Cars Getting Coffee	Himself	Episode Heere's Jerry!. Posthumous release; July 6

=== Commercials ===
Year	Commercial	Role	Notes
1975	Spellbound game		
1980	7-Eleven Convenience Stores		
1991	Diet Pepsi "You Got the Right One, Baby"		
1990s	Coca-Cola		Directed by John Landis

=== Other works ===
Year	Title	Notes
1949	How to Smuggle a Hernia Across the Border	Privately made short film, never commercially released
1950	Screen Snapshots: Thirtieth Anniversary Special	Short subject
1950	My Friend Irma Goes West Trailer	Special scenes filmed for the promotional trailer
1951	Sailor Beware Trailer	Special scenes filmed for the promotional trailer
1953	Scared Stiff Trailer	Special scenes filmed for the promotional trailer
1954	Living It Up Trailer	Special scenes filmed for the promotional trailer
1960	The Bellboy Trailer	Special scenes filmed for the promotional trailer
1960	Raymie	Sings the title song only
1964	The Nutty Professor Trailer	Special scenes filmed for the promotional trailer
1964	The Disorderly Orderly Trailer	Special scenes filmed for the promotional trailer
1966	Man in Motion	Production trailer for Three on a Couch
1984	Terror in the Aisles	Archival footage of Lewis in Scared Stiff
1990	Boy	8-minute short from the compilation film How Are the Kids? (writer and director only)
1992	The Making of Mr. Saturday Night	Documentary for Mr. Saturday Night
2013	When Comedy Went To School	Interviewed for the documentary on The Borscht Belt comedians
2015	Trumbo	Archive footage of Lewis hosting The 29th Academy Awards
2017	Five Came Back	Netflix Documentary, Archive footage of Lewis presenting George Stevens Best Director at The 29th Academy Awards
2017	Sammy Davis Jr.: I’ve Gotta Be Me	Scenes for the documentary on Sammy Davis Jr.
2024	From Darkness to Light	Documentary on The Day the Clown Cried, includes interview with Lewis originally recorded for Der Clown (2016)
