= The Big Mouth =

1967 film by Jerry Lewis

- Directed by: Jerry Lewis
- Screenplay by: Jerry Lewis; Bill Richmond
- Story by: Bill Richmond
- Produced by: Jerry Lewis
- Starring: Jerry Lewis
- Narrated by: Frank De Vol
- Cinematography: W. Wallace Kelley
- Edited by: Russel Wiles
- Music by: Harry Betts
- Color process: (as color by Pathé)
- Production company: Jerry Lewis Productions
- Distributed by: Columbia Pictures
- Release date: July 12, 1967
- Running time: 107 minutes
- Country: United States
- Language: English
- Box office: $2,000,000 (US/Canada); 588,356 admissions (France)

The Big Mouth is a 1967 American comedy film produced, directed, co-written, and starring Jerry Lewis. It was filmed in San Diego and features Frank De Vol as an onscreen narrator.

== Plot ==
Gerald Clamson is a bank examiner who loves fishing on his annual two-week holiday. Unfortunately, one day at the ocean he reels in Syd Valentine, an injured gangster in a scuba diving suit. Syd tells Gerald about diamonds he has stolen from the other gangsters and hands him a map. Gerald escapes as frogmen from a yacht machine-gun the beach. They swim ashore, locate Syd and gun him down. Their leader Thor ensures Syd's demise by firing a torpedo from his yacht that goes ashore, blowing a crater into the beach.

As the police ignore Gerald's story, Gerald heads to the Hilton Inn in San Diego where Syd claimed the diamonds were hidden. There he meets Suzie Cartwright, an airline stewardess. While searching for the diamonds, he needs to avoid the hotel staff after inadvertently hurting the manager. Gerald disguises himself as a character similar to Professor Julius Kelp from The Nutty Professor, while trying to stay one step ahead of the other gangsters who are on his tail, as well as the hotel detectives led by the manager—all the while courting Suzie. As each of the gangsters see Gerald, an identical lookalike to the deceased Syd, they have nervous breakdowns; one imagining himself a dog, one turning into a Larry Fine lookalike, the other becoming a stutterer. The one man Gerald meets who believes him, and identifies himself as an FBI special agent, turns out to be an escapee from an insane asylum.

The movie climaxes in a chase through Sea World San Diego, where Gerald is pursued by Thor's mob, a rival group of gangsters who had made a deal with Syd to buy his diamonds, and a group of Chinese who smuggle the diamonds disguised as plastic pearls. Gerald disguises himself as a Kabuki dancer but is pursued until Suzie rescues him by flying by with a helicopter and dropping a rope ladder that Gerald escapes on. They return to the Pacific Ocean, where Syd reappears. The rival gangsters chase Syd into the ocean, and Gerald and Suzie walk away, deeply in love. The diamonds are never located.

The final scene shows the narrator, Bogart, facing the camera and solemnly announcing that the tale is true—then the camera pulls back as De Vol turns and walks away on the breakwater where the beginning and ending action had taken place. De Vol is wearing all of a business suit except trousers, and he is carrying a briefcase.

== Cast ==
- Jerry Lewis as Gerald Clamson / Syd Valentine
- Harold J. Stone as Thor
- Susan Bay as Suzie Cartwright
- Buddy Lester as Studs
- Del Moore as Mr. Hodges
- Paul Lambert as Moxie
- Jeannine Riley as Bambi Berman
- Leonard Stone as Fong
- Charlie Callas as Rex
- Frank De Vol as Bogart (as Frank De Vol)
- Vern Rowe as Gunner
- David Lipp as Lizard
- Vincent Van Lynn as Fancher
- Mike Mahoney as Detective #1
- Walter Kray as Detective #2
- John Nolen as F.B.I. Agent
- Eddie Ryder as Specs

== Production ==
The Big Mouth was filmed from December 5, 1966, to February 28, 1967, in the newly built Hilton San Diego hotel at Mission Bay and SeaWorld San Diego, marking the film debut of Charlie Callas after he met Lewis on a chat show as well as a cameo by Colonel Harland Sanders.

== Reception ==
On Rotten Tomatoes, the film holds a 40% rating based on 5 reviews, with an average rating of 4.65/10.

== See also ==
- List of American films of 1967
