= Cracking Up (1983 film) =

1983 film directed by Jerry Lewis

- Theatrical poster for Belgian release T'es fou, Jerry ! (French title); Smorgasbord (original title); Ben je gek, Jerry ? (Flemish title)
- Directed by: Jerry Lewis
- Written by: Jerry Lewis; Bill Richmond
- Produced by: Peter Nelson; Arnold Orgolini
- Starring: Jerry Lewis; Herb Edelman; Zane Buzby
- Cinematography: Gerald Finnerman
- Edited by: Gene Fowler Jr.
- Music by: Morton Stevens
- Distributed by: 20th Century Fox (Australia and New Zealand); Warner Bros. (United States)
- Release dates: April 13, 1983 (France); April 22, 1983 (Tucson, Arizona)
- Running time: 83 minutes
- Country: United States
- Language: English
- Box office: 553,259 admissions (France)

Cracking Up is a 1983 American comedy film directed by and starring Jerry Lewis, his last feature film as a director. Originally titled Smorgasbord, it was filmed in 1981 and 1982 and only received limited distribution in the United States. Lewis wrote the screenplay with Bill Richmond, his writing collaborator on films such as The Nutty Professor and The Patsy. The film contains a series of short comic sketches, set pieces and blackout gags.

== Plot ==
Warren Nefron is a klutz who cannot do anything right. He tells his problems to his psychiatrist, Dr. Pletchick. Through a series of flashbacks Nefron's life story is told.

Warren is such a failure that even his many attempts to commit suicide fail. Dr. Pletchick cures Warren with hypnosis, but all of Nefron's problems get transferred to him as a result.

Warren and a young woman attend a film titled Smorgasbord (the film's original title).

== Cast ==
- Jerry Lewis as Warren
- Herb Edelman as the Psychiatrist
- Zane Buzby as the Waitress
- Milton Berle as the Lady (voiced by Ruta Lee)
- Foster Brooks as the Pilot
- Dick Butkus as Anti-Smoking Enforcer
- Francine York as Marie
- Sammy Davis Jr. as himself
- Buddy Lester as Passenger

== Production ==
Cracking Up includes many cameos, including those of Sammy Davis Jr., Dick Butkus and Milton Berle. In December 1982 after filming completed, Lewis underwent triple-bypass heart surgery at Desert Springs Hospital in Las Vegas.

== Release ==
The film was released theatrically in some European countries, such as France (where it was released on April 13, 1983, by Warner Bros.), Belgium and Italy. It was given a limited release in American theatres: it was given a test release in Wichita, Kansas, on April 22, 1983, under its original Smorgasbord title, then in Tucson, Arizona, on September 2, 1983, under its new title Cracking Up. In early 1984, it premiered on cable television, initially on the PRISM channel, and on videocassette. In May 1985, it was given a two-day run at New York's Thalia Theater under its original title, double-billed with The King of Comedy. It later played a smattering of revival houses, art cinemas and film festivals. The film was screened as part of the Jerry Lewis: The Total Filmmaker program at the 2016 Melbourne International Film Festival.

== Reception ==
In a contemporary review for The New York Times, critic Vincent Canby called the film "a mostly cold buffet of random Lewis routines in which the director-star falls off slippery furniture, cracks up automobiles, fails at suicide and can't even walk across the floor of his psychiatrist's office without taking a header."

== Home media ==
Warner Home Video released the film on VHS and Beta on January 4, 1984, touting it as a unique exclusive premiere to home video, disregarding its brief theatrical run.

Warner Archive released the film on DVD on May 18, 2010.
