= Buddy Lester =

American actor and comedian (1915–2002)

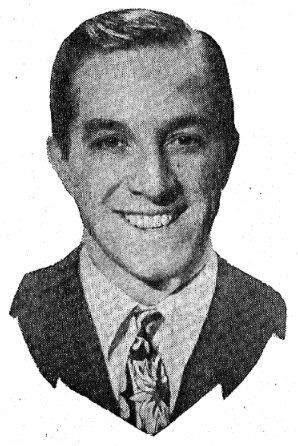
- Buddy Lester in a 1944 advertisement
- Born: William Goldberg; January 16, 1915; Chicago, Illinois, U.S.
- Died: October 4, 2002 (aged 87); Van Nuys, California, U.S.
- Occupations: Actor, comedian
- Years active: 1920s–1980s
- Children: 2

Buddy Lester (born William Goldberg; January 16, 1915 – October 4, 2002) was an American actor and comedian who portrayed dozens of character roles in films and television. Although known for his appearances in Jerry Lewis’ comedy films, he was also regularly seen on popular television shows (such as The New Phil Silvers Show and Barney Miller) in the 1960s and 1970s. As a comedian, he was a fixture on the international nightclub circuit for several decades and was the younger brother of comedian Jerry Lester.

== Life and career ==
Lester was born January 16, 1915, in Chicago, Illinois. He began performing in variety shows in Chicago theaters at the age of seven, with his older brother, Jerry, who later became host of Broadway Open House, the television forerunner of The Tonight Show. He claimed in interviews that an early booster was the notorious mobster Al Capone, who helped the underage entertainers get jobs in nightclubs. After serving in the Navy during World War II, Lester, already an established stand-up comedian, stage actor, and radio host, eventually began appearing in films and on TV, becoming a popular character actor. His first film role was playing himself, as a nightclub entertainer, in the 1959 movie, The Gene Krupa Story.

He regularly appeared in Jerry Lewis features, including The Patsy, The Ladies Man, The Nutty Professor, Three on a Couch, Cracking Up, Hardly Working and The Big Mouth.

Although known mainly as a comic actor, he was also effective portraying tough underworld characters, in part because of his tall stature and a distinctive scar down his right cheek. He enjoyed concocting stories about the origin of the scar – claiming at one point to have received it in a sword duel while a student in Heidelberg, Germany – but admitted that it was actually the result of falling onto a broken drinking glass when he was three years old. Lester portrayed Vince Massler, one of the gang members in the 1960 film Ocean's 11 with Frank Sinatra, for whom he performed as opening act many times.

During the 1963–64 television season, he played "Nick" on The New Phil Silvers Show. In the third season of the show Gomer Pyle, USMC, he played Peter Evans, a crooked gambler. He guest-starred on Make Room for Daddy, where he played the part of a competitive comedian who stole some of Danny Thomas's comedy material.

During the late 1960s and early 1970s Lester appeared in Jack Webb's police series Dragnet (billed as A. B. Lester), and Adam-12. In the 1970s he appeared as "Sidney the bookie" on the hit series Barney Miller. He appeared in many other TV shows and movies from the 1960s through the mid 1980s, while regularly performing as a stand-up comedian.

== Death ==
Lester died from cancer in a Van Nuys, California nursing home on October 4, 2002, aged 87. He had a son and a daughter, and several grand- and great-grandchildren. His older brother, Jerry Lester, died in 1995, aged 85, in Miami, Florida.

== Filmography ==
Year	Title	Role
1959	The Gene Krupa Story	Himself
1960	Ocean's 11	Vince Massler
1961	The Ladies Man	Willard C. Gainsborough
1962	Sergeants 3	Willie Sharpknife
1963	The Nutty Professor	Bartender
1964	The Patsy	Copa Café MC
1966	Three on a Couch	The Drunk
1967	The Big Mouth	Studs
1968	The Party	Davey Kane
1974	Adam-12	Routine patrol
1975	The Man from Clover Grove	Ched Fields
1980	Hardly Working	Claude Reed
1982	Fake-Out	The Blackjack Player
1983	Cracking Up	Passenger
