= The Bellboy =

1960 film

- Directed by: Jerry Lewis
- Written by: Jerry Lewis
- Produced by: Jerry Lewis
- Starring: Jerry Lewis
- Narrated by: Walter Winchell
- Cinematography: Haskell Boggs
- Edited by: Stanley E. Johnson
- Music by: Walter Scharf
- Distributed by: Paramount Pictures
- Release date: July 20, 1960
- Running time: 72 minutes
- Country: United States
- Language: English
- Box office: $10 million 836,783 admissions (France)

The Bellboy is a 1960 American comedy film written, produced, directed by and starring Jerry Lewis. It was released on July 20, 1960, by Paramount Pictures and marked Lewis's directorial debut.

== Plot ==
In a prologue sequence, fictitious executive producer of Paramount Pictures Jack E. Mulcher introduces the film, explaining that it has no story and no plot. The film simply shows a few weeks in the life of a person Mulcher calls "a real nut". Mulcher breaks into hysterical laughter as the story begins.

Stanley the hotel bellhop finds himself in one ridiculous situation after another (through a series of blackout gags) while working at the Fontainebleau Hotel in Miami Beach, Florida. Stanley does not speak until the last scene of the film, as he is always interrupted or silenced by another character.

=== Vignettes and gags ===
- Stanley delivers an entire car engine to Room 664 after being told to "bring up everything out of the trunk" of a rear-engine Volkswagen Beetle.
- The bellhops stand in a line and trip over each other when Bob the Bell Captain points at them from afar to get their attention.
- Mr. Carter stays in Room 625 while Miss Winkley stays in Room 626. Stanley finds Miss Winkley's brassiere in Mr. Carter's luggage and leaves without hanging any of his clothes up.
- Mrs. Hartung loses a large amount of weight from extreme dieting, but when Stanley gives her a box of chocolates, she gains all of the weight back.
- Stanley randomly assigns the keys for all the suites, locking the guests out of their rooms.
- Bob sends Stanley to fill the hotel's empty auditorium with chairs. To Bob's shock, Stanley finishes in record time.
- Jerry Lewis (as himself) arrives at the hotel accompanied by an entourage. The other bellboys comment on Stanley's resemblance to Lewis.
- Stanley delivers a note to Milton Berle, who mistakes Stanley for Jerry Lewis. Lewis then mistakes Berle for a bellboy who looks identical to Berle.
- Stanley loses control over the hotel guests' dogs and they escape into the city streets. He visits the dog track, steals the racing dogs, and takes them back to the hotel.
- Stan Laurel attempts to strike up a conversation with Stanley to no avail.
- Bob puts Stanley in charge of the reception desk, and Stanley destroys the phones when they will not stop ringing.
- After the other bellboys accost a group of models staying at the hotel, Stanley is the only one allowed to handle the models' belongings.
- Stanley is assaulted by a middle-aged couple after they drag him into one of their arguments.
- Mr. Novak gives a lecture about being professionally dressed as he wears casual beach attire.
- A packed dining room forces Stanley to sit next to a gangster boss giving conflicting orders to his subordinates.
- An exhausted woman named Dottie falls asleep on Stanley's shoulder as he takes a break.
- Mr. Novak forbids his staff from going to a burlesque club. Bob is then shown drunk at the club but leaves before the main performer arrives.
- Stanley places a covering on a sleeping man's face to prevent sunburn, but the mesh pattern gives him an uneven tan.
- Stanley attempts to eat lunch by himself but is interrupted by hotel guests ogling at him from behind a window.
- Stanley fails to listen to Bob's instructions and hauls a heavy steamer trunk across the hotel lobby instead of the hat box that Bob wanted.
- A man eats an invisible apple and leaves some for Stanley to finish.
- Stanley overhears a telephone conversation in which a female voice says she that wants to marry someone who doesn't love her for her fortune but finds that the voice belongs to Stan Laurel.
- Stanley refuses to let go of a suitcase, and its owner drags Stanley through the hotel lobby and into a taxi before driving away.
- Newlyweds Mr. and Mrs. Manville wait in the lobby for their suite to be ready. Mr. Manville slips and injures his back as Stanley waxes the floor.
- Stanley is sent to acquire a pickup order from Mr. Weal, but the elevator door fails to open.
- Passing through the theater, Stanley picks up a drum mallet and uses it to conduct an imaginary orchestra. An imaginary audience gives him a round of applause.
- A malfunctioning trouser press leaves a hotel guest's pants as stiff as cardboard.
- Stanley disfigures a bust after failing to read a "wet paint" sign.
- At a golf tournament, the flashbulb of Stanley's camera costs Cary Middlecoff the win and $25,000.
- At 3:30 am, Stanley goes outside to take a photo of the full moon, but his flashbulb causes the moon to become the sun and the night to become daytime.
- After Stanley is sent to retrieve a briefcase from the cockpit of an airplane at the airport, he commandeers an airliner back to the hotel.
- Mr. Novak falsely accuses Stanley of being the organizer of an upcoming labor strike. Stanley speaks for the first time in the film, answering the question as to why he never talks: "Because no one ever asked me."

A voiceover narration states that while the film had no plot, it did have a moral: "You'll never know the next guy's story...unless you ask."

== Cast ==
- Jerry Lewis as Stanley
- Alex Gerry as Mr. Novak, Hotel Manager
- Bob Clayton as Bob, Bell Captain
- Sonny Sands as Sonnie, Bellboy
- Eddie Shaeffer as Eddie, Bellboy
- Herkie Styles as Herkie, Bellboy
- David Landfield as David, Bellboy
- Bill Richmond as Stan Laurel
- Larry Best as Apple Man
- Milton Berle as Himself / Bellboy (uncredited)
- Cary Middlecoff as Himself
- Joe Levitch as Jerry Lewis
- Jack Kruschen as Jack E. Mulcher, Head Executive Producer of Paramount Pictures (uncredited)
- Walter Winchell as Narrator (voice role, uncredited)
- Maxie Rosenbloom as gangster in coffee shop
- Joe E. Ross as gangster in coffee shop
- B.S. Pully as gangster in coffee shop

== Production ==
Lewis originally wrote the script for the film in 1956 and subsequently set it aside because he considered it impractical. Principal photography took place from February 23 to March 5, 1960, and marked his debut as a director. Filming took place on location at the Fontainebleau Hotel in Miami Beach, Florida. Lewis would film during the day and perform in the hotel's nightclub at night.

Before he began, Lewis consulted his friend Stan Laurel, who had worked in silent films and was a master of English pantomime, for suggestions, which he took up enthusiastically, saying "I worshipped the man's knowledge of comedy , so I did everything he said, naturally. I think the film is better because of it." Lewis may have paid homage to Laurel by naming his character Stanley after him. A Laurel lookalike character also appears throughout the story, portrayed by writer and impressionist Bill Richmond.

The film marked the pioneering use of a video assist system, providing Lewis a way to see the action while appearing in a scene. Milton Berle was in town performing at another hotel while Lewis was shooting the picture and agreed to make an appearance as himself and in a dual role as another bellboy. Professional golfer Cary Middlecoff, the "Golf Doctor", appears as himself at a golf tournament. Lewis also appears as a fictional version of himself, credited in the opening credits as Joe Levitch, his birth name.

The Bellboy came about after Paramount wanted a Lewis film for summer release in North America. Paramount wanted to release Cinderfella, which had finished shooting in December 1959, but Lewis wanted to hold back the release of Cinderfella until Christmas 1960. Paramount agreed to his terms if he could deliver another film for the summer release cycle. While playing an engagement in Miami Beach, Lewis devised a concept for a film that could be shot at the hotel during winter and delivered to Paramount by the summer release deadline.

== Reception ==
=== Box office ===
The film grossed about $10 million in the U.S. alone.

=== Critical response ===
Eugene Archer of The New York Times wrote that some parts of the film were "surprisingly successful" and that it was to Lewis' credit that "he has kept his energetic demeanor in reasonable check", to the point that some of his fans "may find the comedian disappointingly restrained".

Variety stated: "Several of the sequences are amusing, but too many are dependent upon climactic sight gags anticipated well ahead of the punch ... There are latent elements of Charlie Chaplin's little tramp, Jacques Tati's 'Hulot,' Danny Kaye's 'Mitty' and Harpo Marx's curiously tender child-man, but the execution falls far short of such inspiration."

John L. Scott of the Los Angeles Times commented that there were "some very laughable situations" in the film, adding, "Some gags don't come off too well, but there are so many that the poorer ones quickly get lost in the fast shuffle."

The Monthly Film Bulletin reviewer wrote: "Too many scenes are both pointless and witless; sometimes the gag doesn't work, sometimes the direction is to blame. And Lewis's habit of ending each joke with a display of cross-eyed, simian mugging is scarcely endearing. Nevertheless, there remain some half-dozen moments of genuine comic invention."

The film has a rating of 80% on Rotten Tomatoes based on 10 reviews, with an average rating of 6.89/10.

== Home media ==
This film was released on DVD on October 12, 2004 and again on July 15, 2014, in a four-film collection titled 4 Film Favorites: Jerry Lewis, with The Ladies Man, The Errand Boy and The Patsy.

== In popular culture ==
- This film is referenced by Alex Hopper (Taylor Kitsch) and Captain Nagata (Tadanobu Asano) in the 2012 film Battleship.
- This film is referenced in Four Rooms within Quentin Tarantino's segment.
- Lewis reprised the role of the messenger in a cameo appearance in the 2013 Brazilian comedy Até que a Sorte nos Separe 2.

== See also ==
- List of American films of 1960
