= The Ladies Man =

1961 film by Jerry Lewis

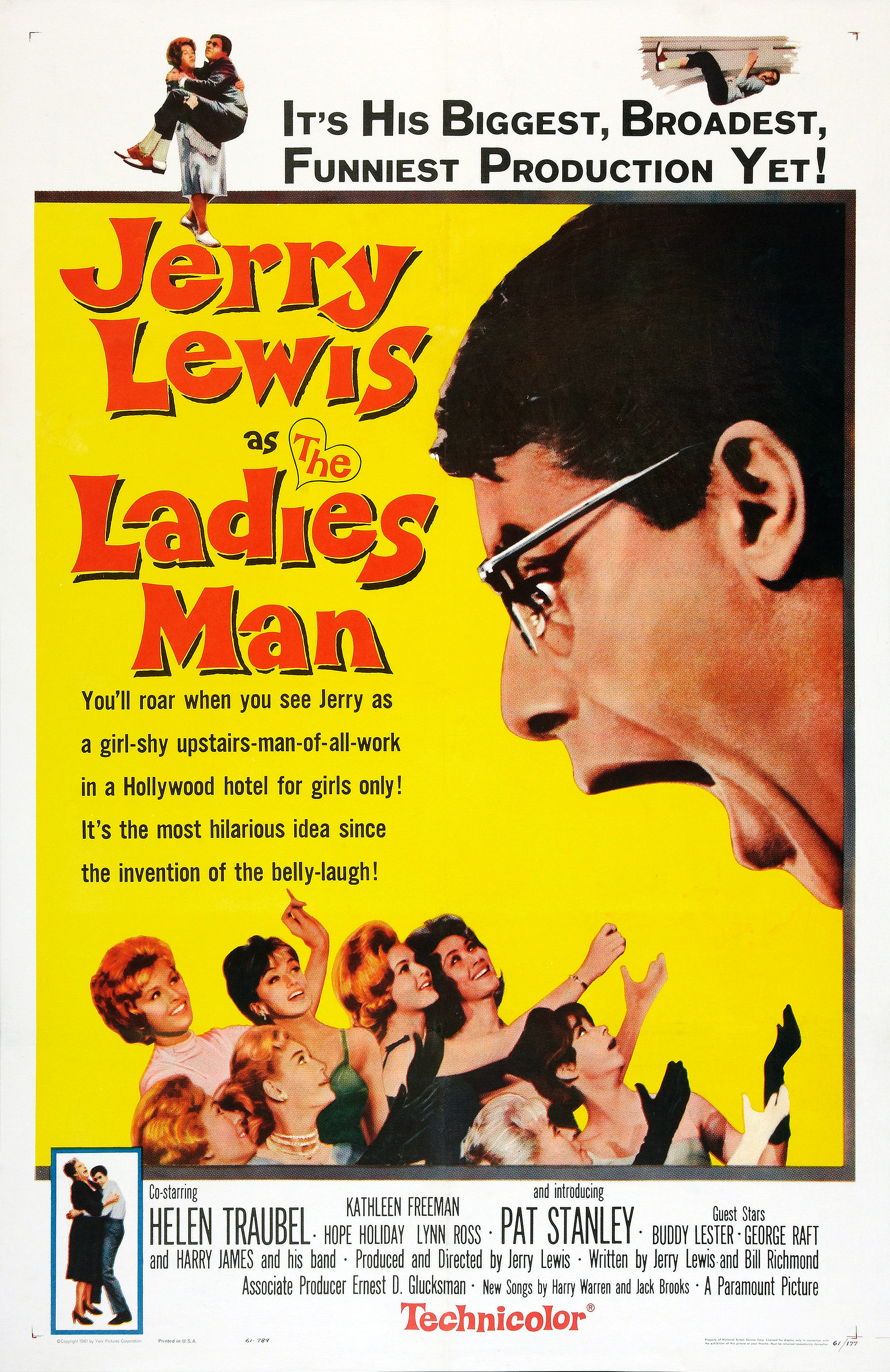
- Theatrical release poster
- Directed by: Jerry Lewis
- Written by: Jerry Lewis; Bill Richmond
- Produced by: Jerry Lewis
- Starring: Jerry Lewis; Helen Traubel; Kathleen Freeman; Hope Holiday; Lynn Ross; Pat Stanley; Buddy Lester; George Raft
- Cinematography: W. Wallace Kelley
- Edited by: Stanley Johnson
- Music by: Walter Scharf
- Distributed by: Paramount Pictures
- Release date: June 28, 1961
- Running time: 106 minutes
- Country: United States
- Language: English
- Budget: $3.1 million or $2.8 million
- Box office: 926,423 admissions (France)

The Ladies Man is a 1961 American comedy film directed by and starring Jerry Lewis. The film follows a recent college graduate who, after his sweetheart leaves him for another man, swears off women and takes a job as a houseboy at a large boarding house, only to find that it is inhabited by dozens of young women. It was released on June 28, 1961, by Paramount Pictures.

== Plot ==
Shortly after graduating from Milltown Junior College in New Jersey, young Herbert H. Heebert plans to propose to his sweetheart Faith, only to find her in the arms of another man. Heartbroken, he announces to his grieving parents that he has decided to swear off women and remain a bachelor.

Arriving in California, Herbert looks for a job as a houseboy. Initially, he only encounters overly eager young women, from whom he runs away screaming. He is soon hired as a houseboy at a large boarding house owned by retired opera singer Helen Welenmelon, where matronly housekeeper Katie is moved to tears after Herbert tells her about his heartbreak. The next morning, Herbert walks into the dining room and is aghast to find that the house is occupied by 31 career women. When he tries to quit, Miss Welenmelon, feigning tears, convinces him to stay. She then instructs the woman to make Herbert feel needed and important.

Herbert's duties in the house include feeding Miss Welenmelon's unseen pet Baby, which roars like a lion from its private room, and delivering the mail. Overwhelmed by the eccentric personalities of some of the boarders, Herbert tries to leave, but the women intercept him and persuade him to stay. When actor George Raft arrives for a date with one of the boarders, Herbert does not believe he is actually George Raft. To prove his identity, Raft dances a tango with Herbert to demonstrate his dancing skills. When a television crew comes to the house to film a live interview with Miss Welenmelon, Herbert repeatedly interrupts the taping.

Despite being warned by Katie not to enter Miss Cartilage's room, Herbert ventures into the room and finds Miss Cartilage dangling from the ceiling, before he hallucinates a surreal big band musical sequence with Miss Cartilage. Afterwards, Herbert tries to leave once again, only to be chased back into the house by the boarders.

Herbert eventually learns that Baby is merely a small dog with a mighty roar. He also bonds with one of the boarders, aspiring actress Fay, whom he consoles after a failed audition. While most of the women treat Herbert like an errand boy, Fay berates the others for exploiting him, insisting that they should treat him more fairly. As Herbert prepares to leave again, none of the women tries to stop him this time. Fay tells Herbert that he is needed in the house, not just to run errands for the women, but because he is a nice person. Elated, Herbert agrees to stay shortly before a roar is heard, prompting all the women to flee in panic. Left alone, Herbert screams for his mother as a real lion struts through the dining room.

== Cast ==
- Jerry Lewis as Herbert H. Heebert / Marna Heebert
- Helen Traubel as Helen N. Welenmellon
- Kathleen Freeman as Katie
- Hope Holiday as Miss Anxious
- Lynn Ross as Miss Vitality
- Mary LaRoche as Miss Society
- Madlyn Rhue as Miss Intellect
- Jack Kruschen as graduation emcee professor
- Pat Stanley as Fay
- Jacqueline Fontaine as working girl
- Gloria Jean as Gloria
- Sylvia Lewis as Miss Cartilage
- Ann McCrea as Miss Sexy Pot
- Buddy Lester as Willard C. Gainsborough
- George Raft as himself
- Harry James as Harry
- Marty Ingels as himself

In addition, Lillian Briggs made her Hollywood acting debut in this film and Patty Thomas plays herself a dancer.

== Production ==
Mel Brooks worked on the screenplay. He fought with Lewis and left the production. In Brooks's biography, he stated that the final draft screenplay only featured two of his scenes and asked the Writers Guild of America to ensure that he was not given any credit. Filming started in November 1960. The main set is a four-story doll house-like interior of a mansion turned boarding house with a central courtyard allowing crane shots spanning its three and a half floors. The structure was several rooms deep at each level and in total 177 ft (54 m) deep, 154 ft (47 m) wide and 36 ft (11 m) feet high. The main set alone cost $500,000 to build (equivalent to $4.05 million in 2024). After two weeks of filming, Lewis fired cinematographer Haskell Boggs, who had worked with him on most of his films, over a disagreement and replaced him with W. Wallace Kelley.

The film features the real-life wedding of Daria Massey and David Lee Joesting.

== Release ==
The Ladies Man premiered in Brooklyn on June 28, 1961. In New York City, it opened on July 12 in a double-bill with Love in a Goldfish Bowl.

=== Home media ===
The film was released on DVD on October 14, 2004, and again on July 15, 2014, as part of the four-film collection 4 Film Favorites: Jerry Lewis, along with The Bellboy, The Errand Boy, and The Patsy.

== Reception ==
Howard Thompson, in a review for The New York Times wrote: "Now, in all fairness to a frankly light-headed vehicle that dies on its feet, Mr. Lewis' latest gets off to a fresh and really funny beginning." However, after the first half-hour, "the remainder of the picture, with everyone else firmly relegated to the background, has Mr. Lewis shuffling and stumbling in full view, as if he and the movie were merely improvising." Overall, it received mixed reviews in New York. Based on a limited selection of non-contemporary reviews, on the review aggregator website Rotten Tomatoes, the film holds an approval rating of 100% based on 11 reviews, with an average rating of 7.6/10.

The film grossed $271,635 in its first week of release in New York.

In 1998, Jonathan Rosenbaum of the Chicago Reader included the film in his unranked list of the best American films not included on the AFI Top 100.
