= The Patsy (1964 film) =

1964 film

- The Patsy Theatrical Poster
- Directed by: Jerry Lewis
- Written by: Jerry Lewis; Bill Richmond
- Produced by: Ernest D. Glucksman
- Starring: Jerry Lewis; Ina Balin; Everett Sloane; Phil Harris; Keenan Wynn; Peter Lorre; John Carradine
- Cinematography: W. Wallace Kelley
- Edited by: John Woodcock
- Music by: Jack Brooks (lyrics); David Raksin
- Distributed by: Paramount Pictures
- Release date: August 12, 1964 (U.S.)
- Running time: 101 minutes
- Country: United States
- Language: English
- Box office: est. $2,500,000 (US/ Canada); 836,439 admissions (France)

The Patsy is a 1964 American comedy film directed by and starring Jerry Lewis. It was released on August 12, 1964, by Paramount Pictures.

== Plot ==
A famous comedian perishes in a plane crash. Members of his management team, worried that they will be jobless, decide to find someone to take his place as their "meal ticket". Stanley Belt is a bellboy at their hotel and they decide he will become their next star.

Before Stanley gives any actual public performances, there is a publicity blizzard and a "grooming process". Stanley is repeatedly outfitted at a luxury clothing store and more swarmed over and abused than prettified at a luxury barber shop.

Stanley has no obvious talent, but his new managers use their power to open doors for him, including an appearance on The Ed Sullivan Show. It quickly appears that Stanley will never develop any talent and the managers fire him just before he goes on stage. However, one of them, Ellen, has fallen in love with Stanley and stays by his side.

Stanley becomes a hit on the show. The others from the management team come begging for their jobs back, and Stanley magnanimously agrees.

== Cast ==
- Jerry Lewis as Stanley Belt
- Everett Sloane as Caryl Fergusson
- Phil Harris as Chic Wymore
- Keenan Wynn as Harry Silver
- Peter Lorre as Morgan Heywood
- John Carradine as Bruce Alden
- Ina Balin as Ellen Betz
- The Four Step Brothers as Themselves

This film contains cameos from a variety of Hollywood personalities including George Raft, Hedda Hopper, Ed Sullivan, Ed Wynn, Mel Tormé, Rhonda Fleming, Scatman Crothers, Phil Foster, Billy Beck, Hans Conried, Richard Deacon, Del Moore, Neil Hamilton, Buddy Lester, Nancy Kulp, Norman Alden, Jack Albertson, Richard Bakalyan, Jerry Dunphy, Kathleen Freeman, Norman Leavitt, Eddie Ryder, Lloyd Thaxton and Fritz Feld.

In addition, Bill Richmond, who co-wrote the screenplay with Lewis, makes a cameo appearance in The Patsy as a piano player.

This was Peter Lorre's final film. He died in March 1964 prior to its release. This film and Lewis's The Disorderly Orderly, released a few months apart, were the final screen appearances of actor Everett Sloane.

== Production ==
The film's working title was Son of Bellboy, as it was originally intended to be a sequel to The Bellboy. Lewis' characters in both films are bellboys named Stanley. It was filmed from January 6 to February 28, 1964.

== Re-release ==
The Patsy was re-released on a double bill with another Jerry Lewis film, The Nutty Professor, in 1967.

== Reception ==
On Rotten Tomatoes, the film holds an 82% rating based on 11 reviews, with an average rating of 6.25/10.

== Home media ==
The Patsy was released on DVD on October 12, 2004, July 15, 2014 in a 4-film collection, 4 Film Favorites: Jerry Lewis, with The Bellboy, The Errand Boy, and The Ladies Man and September 7, 2020.
