= Stanley E. Johnson =

American film editor (1913–1992)

Stanley E. Johnson was an American film editor who worked since the early 1950s on American feature films and television shows. He was born in 1913 and died in 1992.

== Filmography ==
Year	Title	Position
1951	Peking Express (film)	editor
1952	Denver and Rio Grande (film)	editor
1952	Jumping Jacks	editor
1953	Never Wave at a WAC	editor
1956	Davy Crockett and the River Pirates	editor
1957	Johnny Tremain (film)	editor
1957	Old Yeller (film)	editor
1958	The Light in the Forest (film)	editor
1958	Zorro (1957 TV series)	editor, 3 episodes
1959	Darby O'Gill and the Little People	editor, 8 episodes
1960	Toby Tyler or 10 Weeks with a Circus	editor
1960	The Bellboy	editor
1961	Gundown at Sandoval	editor
1961	The Ladies Man	editor
1961	The Errand Boy	editor
1962	Girls! Girls! Girls!	editor
1962-1963	The Lloyd Bridges Show	editor, 3 episodes
1962-1963	The Rifleman	editor, 2 episodes
1963	Fun in Acapulco	editor, 20 episodes
1963	The Great Adventure (American TV series)	editor, 4 episodes
1964	The Cara Williams Show	editor, 2 episodes
1955-1964	Disney anthology television series	editor, 7 episodes
1966	The Boston Tea Party	editor
1974	Together Brothers	editor
1978	Christmas Eve on Sesame Street	editor
