= Three on a Couch =

1966 film by Jerry Lewis

- Directed by: Jerry Lewis
- Screenplay by: Bob Ross; Samuel A. Taylor
- Story by: Arne Sultan; Marvin Worth
- Produced by: Jerry Lewis
- Starring: Jerry Lewis; Janet Leigh; Mary Ann Mobley; Gila Golan; Leslie Parrish; James Best
- Cinematography: W. Wallace Kelley
- Edited by: Russel Wiles
- Music by: Louis Brown
- Color process: Pathécolor
- Production company: Jerry Lewis Productions
- Distributed by: Columbia Pictures
- Release date: March 1966
- Running time: 109 minutes
- Country: United States
- Language: English
- Box office: $2,875,000 (est. US/ Canada rentals); 464,995 admissions (France)

Three on a Couch is a 1966 American comedy film directed by Jerry Lewis and starring Jerry Lewis and Janet Leigh.

== Plot ==
Christopher Pride wants to marry his girlfriend, Dr. Elizabeth Acord. However, she is too involved with her patients and she doesn't think that she would be able to leave them to live in Paris for a year. Pride decides to solve her patients' problems after finding out that most of them are merely despondent after having relationships go bad. Therefore, he decides to "date" these women, without Acord's knowledge, and give them back their self-esteem so that they will be less dependent on their doctor.

Pride adopts a separate persona for each woman, targeted to be their ideal partner. Ringo Raintree the millionaire cowboy woos Anna Jacque, a French patient. For southern belle Mary Lou Mauve he becomes Rutherford the zoologist (and Rutherford's twin sister, Heather) and for passionate athlete Susan he becomes Warren, also an athlete.

The film comes to a climax when all the women, including the psychiatrist, assemble at a party with Pride present. He quickly switches from one character to the next depending on which woman is present.

== Cast ==
- Jerry Lewis as Christopher Pride / Warren / Ringo / Rutherford / Heather
- Janet Leigh as Dr.Elizabeth Acord
- Mary Ann Mobley as Susan Manning
- Gila Golan as Anna Jacque
- Leslie Parrish as Mary Lou Mauve
- James Best as Dr. Ben Mizer
- Kathleen Freeman as Murphy
- Jesslyn Fax as Rich Lady
- Buddy Lester as The Drunk
- Renie Riano as Old Woman
- Renzo Cesana as The Ambassandor
- Fritz Feld as The Attache

== Production ==
This was the first film that Lewis made for Columbia after ending a 17-year long association with Paramount Pictures. This is also the first film that Lewis directed in which he did not receive a screenwriting credit. It was filmed from September 13 - December 1, 1965, it was released on July 7, 1966.

Comedians Buddy Lester and Fritz Feld have cameos. Janet Leigh previously co-starred with Lewis and Dean Martin in Living It Up (1954).

== Reception ==
The film was included in the 1978 book, The Fifty Worst Films of All Time (and How They Got That Way), by Harry Medved, Randy Dreyfuss, and Michael Medved.

== Home media ==
Three on a Couch was released on DVD in a Jerry Lewis Triple Feature collection with Don't Raise the Bridge, Lower the River, and Hook, Line & Sinker on January 16, 2018 and own its own on December 8, 2019.

== See also ==
- List of American films of 1966
