= The Gene Krupa Story =

1959 film by Don Weis

- 1959 theatrical poster
- Directed by: Don Weis
- Written by: Orin Jannings
- Produced by: Philip A. Waxman
- Starring: Sal Mineo; Susan Kohner; James Darren; Susan Oliver; Red Nichols; Bobby Troup; Anita O'Day; Shelly Manne; Buddy Lester
- Cinematography: Charles Lawton Jr.
- Edited by: Edwin H. Bryant; Maurice Wright
- Music by: Leith Stevens
- Distributed by: Columbia Pictures
- Release date: December 1959
- Running time: 101 minutes
- Country: United States
- Language: English

The Gene Krupa Story (also known as Drum Crazy) is a 1959 biopic of American drummer and bandleader Gene Krupa. The conflict in the film centers on Krupa's rise to success and his corresponding use of marijuana.

== Plot ==
The young Gene Krupa brings home a set of drums and puts them in the family room. His mother and three of his brothers stand by as his father makes it clear, as he has many times before, that he abhors the idea of Gene playing jazz drums. He says, "I have been too easy on my baby son," and insists that Gene be "somebody fine...a priest, maybe". Gene is about to graduate high school and does not want to study in a seminary; he says he doesn't know why, but he has to be a drummer. His father orders him to get rid of the drum set. Gene says he can't and his father reacts by busting the tom-toms and the balance of the set. Gene says he will find a way to keep getting drums no matter how often his father busts them, that he has an opportunity to play with a group of guys, for money.

During rehearsals for some of his initial club performances, Krupa meets a girl named Ethel, who is immediately struck by his drumming. At a swim party, the two have a long conversation about many things. Ethel confides that, after graduation, she wants to go to New York City to study and write music. The two begin to fall in love.

When he gets home, Gene finds that his father has died. Feeling obligated, he goes to study for the priesthood, but at the seminary he feels lost and unable to devote his whole self. He imagines “syncopated versions” of Ave Maria when he should be listening to hymns in a quiet, penitent reverie; even after a year there, he cannot shake his dreams of becoming a musician. The priest who is his advisor suspects Krupa's interest is waning and reminds him that the priesthood is "a fulfillment, not a penance". He advises Gene to take summer vacation at home to consider if this life-choice is "meant to be".

At home, his old pals are playing in a local speakeasy. Krupa gently rubs the drum set's crash cymbal between his thumb and forefinger; his friend Eddie asks him to sit in with the gang for the summer. Gene struggles with this, still feeling he should be committed to the church. He does quit the seminary, though, and plays with the band. His mother stops in one evening and expresses her disappointment in him. Ethel suggests Krupa's and Eddie's music is better than the dives they play in, that they should go to New York.

The three friends make the jump to New York where the guys struggle to find decent jobs. Ethel lands work as a switchboard operator. Gene and Ethel reaffirm they are in love; Eddie, who was at one time planning to marry her, has been aware of Ethel's feelings for a long time. He harbors no ill-will about it. At an upscale party, in a leap of faith, Krupa takes over the drums and performs with the bandleader Tommy Dorsey, his brother Jimmy and Red Nichols. Nichols offers him a spot in his pit band for George Gershwin’s new show Strike Up the Band.

He and Eddie play on recording sessions and in various high-class clubs. After a performance of “Cherokee” with the Benny Goodman Orchestra Krupa's career takes off. He becomes maddened with his success; he throws wild parties in his ostentatious home, embarks on a downward spiral of alcohol abuse and cheating on Ethel, and alienates Eddie. Ethel leaves him. A female singer urges marijuana cigarettes on him, as she slurs her words and behaves clearly under-the-influence. Gene achieves greatness leading his own ensemble, but he develops a crippling psychological addiction to marijuana. A few times, while performing, he drops his sticks and his timing is off, which he later does blame on the illegal substance. At the peak of his career, Krupa is busted on dope charges after marijuana cigarettes in envelopes are found in his coat. It becomes evident this is a frame-up, possibly by a jealous co-worker, but he is convicted and sentenced to 90 days in jail.

Upon release, Gene speaks with Ken Le May about working in his band, only to be rejected because of the public's perception of Krupa as an addict. He is forced to play in a series of dives and strip joints. Ethel finds him in one of these places and tells him that, through Eddie, she has learned Tommy Dorsey is forming a new band. Dorsey's people have to know how to read music; Gene has never learned that skill and Ethel encourages him to finally do so. He does, under the tutelage of a member of the New York Philharmonic.

Though Dorsey already has a drummer, Eddie gives the bandleader the idea to highlight Krupa in a "special return appearance". The performance starts out great, but hecklers begin jeering him. To the audience's surprise the Tommy Dorsey Band drummer (played by Shelly Manne) picks up the beat when Krupa falters, and covers for his fellow drummer as a sign of support. Gene composes himself and is able to finish a call-and-response two-man drum solo. The audience rewards Krupa with a standing ovation. The film ends as Ethel tries to sneak off, sure Gene will return to his old ways. He catches up with her, and asks where she is going, "without me?" The closing credits come down on a shot of them walking away together, into the night. In real life, the two were first married from 1934 to 1942; they remarried in 1946 and were together until Ethel's death in 1955.

== Cast ==
- Sal Mineo as Gene Krupa
- Susan Kohner as Ethel Maguire
- James Darren as Eddie Sirota
- Susan Oliver as Dorissa Dinell
- Yvonne Craig as Gloria Corregio
- Lawrence Dobkin as Speaker Willis
- Celia Lovsky as Mother
- Red Nichols as himself
- Bobby Troup as Tommy Dorsey
- Anita O'Day as herself
- Shelly Manne as Davey Tough
- Buddy Lester as himself

== Production notes ==
Krupa himself played the drums on the soundtrack for the film, and for the sequences in which Mineo, as Gene, plays the drums.

Considerable liberty was taken with the actual timeline of events in Gene's life; for example, the picturing of Bix Beiderbecke arriving at a party in Krupa's New York apartment in approximately 1934, whereas Beiderbecke had died in August 1931.

Susan Oliver and Yvonne Craig share a title card in this film. They would each go on to portray green-skinned slave girls on Star Trek.

== See also ==
- List of American films of 1959
