= Retenez Moi...Ou Je Fais Un Malheur =

French comedy film directed by Michel Gerard

- Theatrical release poster
- Directed by: Michel Gerard
- Written by: Michel Gerard
- Produced by: Pierre Kalfon; Michel Gerard
- Starring: Jerry Lewis; Michel Blanc; Charlotte de Turckheim
- Cinematography: Jean Monsigny
- Edited by: Gérard Le Du
- Music by: Vladimir Cosma
- Distributed by: Gaumont Distribution
- Release date: 11 January 1984 (France)
- Running time: 90 minutes
- Country: France
- Language: English
- Box office: $4.8 million

Retenez Moi...Ou Je Fais Un Malheur is a 1984 French comedy film directed by Michel Gerard and starring Jerry Lewis, Michel Blanc, and Charlotte de Turckheim. It was released on 11 January 1984 in France by the Gaumont Distribution.

== Plot ==
Jerry Logan is a Las Vegas police officer who is visiting France to see his ex-wife, with whom he is still friendly. She is remarried to Laurent Martin, who is a police officer in France.

The two men do not hit it off very well at first, but eventually they team up to solve the case of some art smugglers.

== Cast ==
- Jerry Lewis as Jerry Logan
- Michel Blanc as Laurent Martin
- Charlotte de Turckheim as Marie-Christine Martin
- Michel Peyrelon as Franz
- Mylène Demongeot as The bench woman
- Jackie Sardou as The opera opener

== Release ==
This was one of two films that Jerry Lewis made in the 1980s strictly for European release. They have never been released in the US, although it has been given at least two tentative US release titles: To Catch a Cop and The Defective Detective.

Lewis, speaking about this film and Par où t'es rentré ? On t'a pas vu sortir, said that "as long as I have control [over distribution], you'll never see them in this country [United States]".
