= Bill Richmond (writer) =

American screenwriter

- Born: William Earle Richmond; December 19, 1921; Muhlenberg County, Kentucky, U.S.
- Died: June 4, 2016 (aged 94); Calabasas, California, U.S.
- Occupations: Film and television comedy writer/producer Musician
- Years active: 1952–1995
- Spouse(s): Diana Chiara Jannotta (1924-1993; her death); Lorraine Sevre (?-2007; her death); Saria Kraft Richmond (2008-2016; his death)
- Children: 4

William Earle Richmond (December 19, 1921 – June 4, 2016) was an American film and television comedy writer and producer, as well as a musician, actor and composer. He co-wrote the screenplays to numerous popular films that starred Jerry Lewis. These films included The Nutty Professor, The Errand Boy and The Ladies Man. He also made cameo appearances in some of Lewis' films as well, such as a piano player in The Patsy. Later in his career, he wrote and/or produced for numerous television shows, including Laugh-in, Walt Disney's Wonderful World of Color, The Carol Burnett Show, I Dream of Jeannie, Welcome Back Kotter, Three's Company, The John Larroquette Show, Wizards and Warriors, All in the Family, Blossom and Kate & Allie.

He won three Emmy Awards for his writing work (shared) on The Carol Burnett Show for the years 1974, 1975 and 1978.

== Life and career ==
Born in Kentucky, Richmond grew up in Rockford, Illinois. Following military service as a Marine Corps fighter pilot in World War II, Bill decided to pursue his dream of being a jazz musician by moving to Los Angeles. He became a journeyman drummer, working through the latter 1940s and the 1950s for the likes of Frank Sinatra, Peggy Lee, Harry James, Les Brown and Nelson Riddle. He took up studies at the Westlake College Of Music and became a graduate in the mid-50s. By the late 1950s, tiring of the grind, Richmond was looking to retire from music and try something new. It was at this point that Jerry Lewis asked him to join his band; Bill wasn't eager to take on another long-term drumming gig, but he realized that this could be a golden opportunity to try his hand at comedy writing. Already well known backstage for his wit, Richmond began pitching gag ideas to Lewis, who quickly moved him out from behind the drum kit and into the writers' room.

His first project for Lewis was The Ladies Man, and his co-screenwriter was Mel Brooks. However, Brooks and Lewis soon had a clash of temperament and Brooks quit the film, leaving Richmond to collaborate alone with Jerry on the screenplay. He worked with Lewis on several more films in the Sixties, along with writing for two of Jerry's network television series. The pair reunited to co-script Cracking Up in 1983.

Richmond has appeared in small roles as an actor in several films and television shows, most notably a silent role as "Stan Laurel" in The Bellboy, a part which he reprised in a short filmed message which Jerry privately made for the real Laurel that year.

== Death ==
Richmond died on June 4, 2016, in Calabasas, California, at the age of 94. He was predeceased by his first wife, Diana, who died in 1993, aged 69, and by his second wife, Lorraine Sevre, who died in 2007, aged 61.

He was survived by his third wife, Saria, four children, and extended family.
