= Don't Raise the Bridge, Lower the River =

1968 British film by Jerry Paris

- Cinema poster
- Directed by: Jerry Paris
- Screenplay by: Max Wilk
- Based on: the novel by Max Wilk
- Produced by: Walter Shenson
- Starring: Jerry Lewis
- Cinematography: Otto Heller
- Edited by: Bill Lenny
- Music by: David Whitaker
- Production company: Walter Shenson Productions
- Distributed by: Columbia Pictures
- Release date: 12 July 1968
- Running time: 100 minutes
- Country: United Kingdom
- Language: English
- Box office: $1,100,000 (US/ Canada); 316,754 admissions (France)

Don't Raise the Bridge, Lower the River is a 1968 British comedy film directed by Jerry Paris and starring Jerry Lewis, Terry-Thomas and Jacqueline Pearce. It was written by Max Wilk based on his 1961 novel of the same title, with the original Connecticut locale moved to Swinging London and Portugal. It was produced by Walter Shenson and released on 12 July 1968 by Columbia Pictures.

== Plot ==
George Lester is an American living in Britain. His passion is get-rich-quick schemes, and they have caused financial and personal grief for him and his wife, Pamela, who is considering divorce if he continues with them.

Willy Homer is a conman who plans to help George raise some quick cash by selling plans for a drill to a group of Arabs. The plans, which were stolen, are smuggled to Lisbon with help from his accomplice, Fred Davies. As they are about to trade the plans, they realise that they are being double-crossed. A series of chases follows, and eventually the plans are revealed to be worthless to everyone.

Distraught, George finds comfort in his wife and promises to never embark on any more schemes, but Willy shows up at his door with another one.

== Cast ==
- Jerry Lewis as George Lester
- Terry-Thomas as H. William Homer
- Jacqueline Pearce as Pamela Lester
- Bernard Cribbins as Fred Davies
- Patricia Routledge as Lucille Beatty
- Nicholas Parsons as Dudley Heath
- Michael Bates as Dr. Spink
- Colin Gordon as Mr. Hartford
- John Bluthal as Dr. Pinto
- Sandra Caron as Pinto's nurse
- Pippa Benedict as Fern Averback
- Margaret Nolan as Spink's nurse
- Harold Goodwin as Six-Eyes Wiener
- John Barrard as Zebra man
- Niké Arrighi as Portuguese waitress
- Al Mancini as Portuguese chauffeur
- Alexandra Dane as masseuse
- Molly Peters as Heath's secretary
- Colin Douglas as barman
- Francesca Tu as Chinese telephonist

== Production ==
Filming took place between 15 May and 30 June 1967. The director, Jerry Paris, has a cameo as the umpire at a baseball game.

== Critical reception ==
The Monthly Film Bulletin wrote: "Even the most diehard Jerry Lewis enthusiasts would be hard put to find anything to please them in this disastrous muddle of a film. Quite apart from the fact that Lewis and director Jerry Paris seem to have been at odds with each other throughout the film, there is scarcely a single gag which doesn't misfire; and the result is an embarrassingly unfunny farrago of comedy styles, ranging from the more asinine antics of the Carry On series (a predatory Girl Guide leader collapsing into highpitched giggles at the mere sight of a man) to Lewis at his twittering worst, and petering out in a feeble slapstick finale. Left to himself, Lewis occasionally almost pulls off a gag (the one idea that does work is a purely visual joke in which he appears to be playing draughts with a black-gloved German until the camera pulls back to reveal the two hands at opposite ends of the board as his own); but elsewhere he looks sadly lost in the midst of a number of British comedy stalwarts, and his tired impersonations of half a dozen nationalities fall very flat."

Kine Weekly wrote: "What might have been an entertaining comedy has been made into a raging farce, which is, of course, entirely suited to the comic style of Jerry Lewis. He is, however, far more subdued than usual and uses hardly any of his famous grimaces. The result is a farce that is curiously sparing of real laughter."

Variety wrote: "An initial lack of clarity in plot premise, followed by routine and not very exciting episodic treatment add up to a generally flat result. Terry-Thomas heads a good supporting cast."

Leslie Halliwell said: "Dreary comedy apparently intent on proving that its star can be just as unfunny abroad as at home."

The Radio Times Guide to Films gave the film 2/5 stars, writing: "Jerry Lewis is quite hopelessly adrift and desperately unfunny in an awkward UK adaptation of humorist Max Wilk's novel. It's ham-fistedly directed by former actor Jerry Paris, and concerns Lewis's plans to steal a high-speed oil drill and peddle the plans to oil-rich Arabs. The Brits acquit themselves well, yet both pace and tone are uncertain, and Lewis's performance is embarrassingly undirected."

== Home media ==
The film has been released twice on Region 1 DVD, on 8 July 2003 and again in a Jerry Lewis Triple Feature collection with Three on a Couch (1966) and Hook, Line & Sinker (1969) on 16 January 2018.
