= Method to the Madness of Jerry Lewis =

2011 documentary about Jerry Lewis

- Genre: Documentary
- Directed by: Gregg Barson
- Starring: Jerry Lewis
- Country of origin: United States
- Original language: English

Production
- Producer: Gregg Barson
- Cinematography: Peter Good
- Editor: James Ruxin
- Running time: 115 minutes

Original release
- Network: Starz Encore
- Release: December 17, 2011

Method to the Madness of Jerry Lewis is a 2011 American documentary of actor Jerry Lewis. It was released on Encore on December 17, 2011.

== Plot ==
A chronological view of Jerry Lewis' career beginning with his 10-year partnership with Dean Martin to his career as a producer, director, writer, and actor. Archival clips, interviews with friends and family, as well as Lewis himself are included.

== Cast ==
- Jerry Lewis
- Alec Baldwin
- Richard Belzer
- Carol Burnett
- Chevy Chase
- Billy Crystal
- Woody Harrelson
- John Landis
- Richard Lewis
- Eddie Murphy
- Carl Reiner
- Jerry Seinfeld
- Steven Spielberg
- Quentin Tarantino

== Reception ==
The film holds a 67% rating based on 12 critical reviews at Rotten Tomatoes.

The Washington Post said of the film, "The old clips are still a hoot, but there's a limit to how much compressed air a viewer can take, listening to a bunch of old men talk about how funny their friend was." The New York Times review stated, "...by the end of this documentary, yes, you're convinced that Mr. Lewis was a much larger figure than is generally acknowledged. But you still don't feel as if you know him."

== Home media ==
The film was released on DVD on January 22, 2013.
