= The Disorderly Orderly =

1964 film by Frank Tashlin

- Theatrical lobby card
- Directed by: Frank Tashlin
- Screenplay by: Frank Tashlin
- Story by: Norm Liebermann; Ed Haas
- Produced by: Paul Jones
- Starring: Jerry Lewis; Susan Oliver; Glenda Farrell; Kathleen Freeman; Karen Sharpe
- Narrated by: Paul Frees
- Cinematography: W. Wallace Kelley
- Edited by: John Woodcock; Russel Wiles
- Music by: Joseph J. Lilley
- Color process: Technicolor
- Distributed by: Paramount Pictures
- Release date: December 16, 1964
- Running time: 89 minutes
- Country: United States
- Language: English
- Box office: $2,700,000 (US/ Canada rentals); 1,434,122 admissions (France)

The Disorderly Orderly is a 1964 American comedy film released by Paramount Pictures, and starring Jerry Lewis. The film was produced by Paul Jones with a screenplay by director Frank Tashlin, based on a story by Norm Liebermann and Ed Haas.

== Plot ==
Jerome Littlefield is an orderly at a hospital. His dream is to be a doctor, but he has a problem that prevents it from becoming a reality: when he hears of a problem that a patient is having, psychosomatically he begins to suffer those symptoms as well.

Susan Andrews, an old high school friend, is brought to the hospital after a suicide attempt. Littlefield recognizes her as the girl he has had a crush on since then. Eventually Andrews falls for Littlefield and they kiss. Littlefield later realizes that his problem with suffering from other people's symptoms was a direct result of his obsession with Andrews. Now that he has overcome that, his problems go away and he finally becomes a doctor.

== Cast ==
- Jerry Lewis as Jerome Littlefield
- Susan Oliver as Susan
- Kathleen Freeman as Nurse Higgins
- Glenda Farrell as Dr. Howard
- Karen Sharpe as Julie
- Alice Pearce as Mrs. Fuzzibee
- Barbara Nichols as Patient
- Jack E. Leonard as Patient
- Everett Sloane as Mr. Tuffington

== Production ==
The Disorderly Orderly was filmed at the Greystone Park and Mansion in Beverly Hills, California with costumes designed by Edith Head.

== Soundtrack ==
The title song, sung over the opening credits, is performed by Sammy Davis Jr. The title song "The Disorderly Orderly" was written by songwriter Earl Shuman.

== Reception ==
While Howard Thompson of the New York Times (December 24, 1964) liked a few comedic bits and praised some secondary performers, he generally panned The Disorderly Orderly, writing that the film "runs dry at the end of the first third — like a juiceless watermelon — and splits open, with about the same results."

On Rotten Tomatoes, the film holds a 60% rating based on 5 reviews, with an average rating of 5.95/10.

== Home media ==
The film was released to Region 1 DVD on October 12, 2004 and March 15, 2021.
