= The Trust (2016 film) =

2016 film by Alex Brewer and Ben Brewer

- Theatrical release poster
- Directed by: Alex Brewer; Ben Brewer
- Written by: Ben Brewer; Adam Hirsch
- Produced by: Molly Hassell; Braxton Pope; Habib Paracha
- Starring: Nicolas Cage; Elijah Wood; Sky Ferreira; Jerry Lewis; Kevin Weisman; Steven Williams
- Cinematography: Sean Porter
- Edited by: Lauren Connelly
- Music by: Reza Safinia
- Production companies: Highland Film Group; Saeculum Productions; Hassell Free Production
- Distributed by: Saban Films
- Release dates: March 14, 2016 (SXSW); April 14, 2016 (United States)
- Running time: 93 minutes
- Country: United States
- Language: English

The Trust is a 2016 American crime drama film directed by Alex and Ben Brewer, written by Ben Brewer and Adam Hirsch, and starring Nicolas Cage, Elijah Wood, Sky Ferreira, Jerry Lewis, Kevin Weisman and Steven Williams. The film was released on DirecTV on April 14, 2016, before being released on video on demand and in theaters on May 12, 2016, by Saban Films. Although Max Rose was released after The Trust, this film marks the last role that Jerry Lewis filmed before his death in 2017.

== Plot ==
Young police Sergeant David Waters and his older boss and friend Lieutenant Jim Stone both work in the Evidence Management unit of the Las Vegas Metropolitan Police Department. Disillusioned and bored with their jobs, they also find it hard to make ends meet financially. While looking through case files, Jim comes across a mysterious case: a low level drug dealer who was bailed out of jail—paid for with $200,000 in cash—indicating that this dealer has access to large amounts of money.

Using his vacation days, Jim conducts unapproved undercover surveillance at the hotel where the drug dealer works. He discovers that all of the merchandise that the dealer's gang moves is taken to one building and never moved out. David acquires blueprints from the county planning office and discovers that the gang has built a large safe in the back of an industrial freezer in the building. Realizing it is unguarded, Jim and David decide to break into the safe and steal the contents. They map out the exact location of the safe and acquire a floor-standing drill press and a diamond-tipped drill from Germany to drill into the safe door. They also buy black market firearms to use instead of their service pistols, paying for everything with illegally acquired cash from a corrupt colleague. The complicated plan requires them to drill into the safe door from the residential apartment above the freezer, to allow them to attack the safe without triggering "failsafe" door locks. Much of the heist is planned in meticulous detail, but the plan for dealing with whoever is in the targeted apartment is left unclear.

On the day of the theft, the two break into the apartment above the freezer, but they do not handle the two occupants, a man and a woman, very well. They restrain and muffle the two, but Jim ends up shooting and killing the man after the man spits at him. They use up two regular drill bits going through the concrete that divides the two spaces. They then use the diamond-tipped drill to go into the safe door, but the drill press stops working when a drive belt breaks. Having no spare belts, the two build an improvised explosive to finish the hole. Once the hole is completed, Jim watches the safe's tumblers using a long flexible cystoscope, while David manipulates the safe's dial. As each number is identified, David writes it on the safe door. When the door is opened, the two discover that the high-tech vault is filled with extraordinary high-value gems. Jim is elated, but David becomes concerned that stealing so many valuables from the gang will get them tracked down and killed. They decide to return to the apartment to clean up in preparation to leave, and David locks the safe behind him as the two go back upstairs.

In the apartment, David becomes empathetic for the surviving female hostage. She asks David to call her husband so that she can make sure that her 3-year-old son is taken care of. David agrees, and the woman has a very brief conversation with whoever answers the phone. They break down the drillbit and discuss what is left to be done before they leave. When Jim and David return to the safe, Jim discovers that David not only locked the safe door but also erased the combination numbers. Enraged, Jim threatens David at gunpoint, forcing him to open the safe. The valuables are loaded into bags, and Jim begins loading bags into their van. However, when David goes to kill the woman, he gets cold feet and shoots Jim instead. After a brief shootout, Jim is finally killed.

David returns all the valuables back into the safe and loads the woman into the van, promising her that he will release her when they get far enough away from the city. As they are driving on a deserted stretch of road, the van is surrounded by other vehicles, including a contractor's truck marked with a company's phone number, the same phone number that the woman had David call earlier. David attempts to identify himself as a police officer, but he is shot dead, and the movie closes with physical evidence from the car and heist being catalogued and stored in the Evidence Management building where David and Jim used to work.

== Cast ==
- Nicolas Cage as Lieutenant Jim Stone
- Elijah Wood as Sergeant David Waters
- Sky Ferreira as Woman
- Jerry Lewis as Stone's Father
- Ethan Suplee as Detective
- Kenna James as Captain Harris
- Kevin Weisman as Roy
- Steven Williams as Cliff

== Production ==
On May 14, 2014, Nicolas Cage and Jack Huston joined the prospective cast, the latter for the co-leading role eventually assigned to Elijah Wood. On November 6, 2014, Saban Capital Group acquired the theatrical distribution rights to the film for its division, Saban Films. On January 30, 2015, Elijah Wood joined the cast. On February 9, 2015, singer Sky Ferreira joined the cast. On February 18, 2015, Jerry Lewis joined the cast. Principal photography began on January 26, 2015. Filming took place entirely in Las Vegas.

== Release ==
The film premiered at South by Southwest on March 14, 2016. The film was released on DirecTV on April 14, 2016, before being released on video on demand and in theaters on May 13, 2016, by Saban Capital Group's Saban Films.

== Home media ==
The film was released on DVD and Blu-ray on August 2, 2016.

== Reception ==
The Trust received mixed reviews from critics. On Rotten Tomatoes, the film has an approval rating of 64%, based on 46 reviews, with an average rating of 5.47/10. The critical consensus states: "The Trust may not be an all-time heist classic, but its solidly workmanlike plot -- and the chemistry between Nicolas Cage and Elijah Wood -- should satisfy genre enthusiasts." On Metacritic, the film has a score of 58 out of 100, based on 12 critics, indicating "mixed or average reviews".

== See also ==
- List of films set in Las Vegas
