= Blackout gag =

Comedy technique where a gag closes immediately after the punchline

A blackout gag is a kind of joke in broad, rapid-fire slapstick comedy. The term is derived from burlesque and vaudeville, when the lights were quickly turned off after the punchline of a joke to accentuate it and encourage audience laughter. It may use a shock value to define the joke, and may not be initially noticeable to all viewers if it is a very fast joke.

"A blackout gag and a moment's silence provide the transition to the next scene"

It is distinguished from an iris shot, frequently used in the silent film era, where a black circle closes to end a scene.

The term blackout gag can also apply to fast-paced television or film comedy, such as Rowan & Martin's Laugh-In, where there may not literally be a blackout, but a quick cut to the next gag.

== See also ==
- One-line joke

== Sources ==
- Jenkins, Henry (9 November 2012), "Mel Brooks, Vulgar Modernism, and Comic Remediation", in Horton, Andrew; Rapf, Joanna E. (eds.), A Companion to Film Comedy, John Wiley & Sons, pp. 151–171, doi:10.1002/9781118327821.ch7, ISBN 978-1-1183-2785-2, "In some cases, Brooks could construct an entire sequence of nothing but blackout gags, as in the prehistoric sequence of History, which depicts the first artist and first critic, the discovery of fire, the invention of music, and so forth. ... the fly lands in Henny Youngman's soup is a classic example of a blackout gag–in this case, it ... There's a blackout gag in Silent Movie which works very much in this same way: in the ..."
