= W. Wallace Kelley =

American cinematographer and visual effects artist

- Born: February 2, 1902; New Jersey, U.S.
- Died: September 27, 1982 (aged 80); Los Angeles, California, U.S.
- Occupations: Cinematographer, visual effects artist
- Spouse: Violet R. Kelley
- Children: 1

W. Wallace Kelley (February 2, 1902 – September 27, 1982) was an American cinematographer and visual effects artist. He was nominated for an Academy Award in the category Best Special Effects for the film Unconquered.

Kelley died in September 1982 in Los Angeles, California, at the age of 80. He was buried in Forest Lawn Memorial Park.

== Selected filmography ==
- Unconquered (1947; co-nominated with Farciot Edouart, Devereux Jennings, Gordon Jennings, Paul Lerpae and George Dutton)
