= Henry Bumstead =

American art director

- Born: Lloyd Henry Bumstead; March 17, 1915; Ontario, California
- Died: May 24, 2006 (aged 91); Pasadena, California
- Occupations: Art director, production designer

Lloyd Henry "Bummy" Bumstead (March 17, 1915 – May 24, 2006) was an American cinematic art director and production designer. In a career that spanned nearly 70 years, Bumstead began as a draftsman in RKO Pictures' art department and later served as an art director or production designer on more than 90 feature films. He won Academy Awards for Best Art Direction for To Kill a Mockingbird (1962) and The Sting (1973). He was also nominated for Academy Awards for his work on Vertigo (1958) and Unforgiven (1992).

After attending the University of Southern California, he began working at RKO Pictures in 1937. His career was interrupted by military service during World War II. He worked at Paramount Pictures in the 1940s and 1950s and at Universal Studios in the 1960s and 1970s. He collaborated with George Roy Hill and Clint Eastwood on multiple films. His final work, at age 91, was on Eastwood's Flags of Our Fathers (2006).

== Early years ==
Bumstead was born in 1915 in Ontario, California, 35 miles east of Los Angeles. His father operated L.G. Bumstead & Company, a sporting goods store, and his mother was a teacher. In high school, he was captain of the football, team, student body president, and class valedictorian.

He received a scholarship to the University of Southern California where he studied architecture. He also played football and ran hurdles for the track team.

== Film career ==
=== RKO and Paramount ===
Bumstead interned with RKO Pictures in 1935 while still a student at USC. In 1937, he went to work as a draftsman RKO's art department. He received his first screen credit for set design for the 1944 feature The Story of Dr. Wassell.

Bumstead's career was interrupted by service in the Navy during World War II. After the war, he joined Paramount Pictures where he worked and studied under the noted art directors, Hans Dreier and Roland Anderson. Bumtead's first film as an art director was the 1948 feature Saigon. Early works also included Come Back, Little Sheba (1952 film) and The Bridges at Toko-Ri (1952).

Later in the 1950s, Bumstead worked on two Alfred Hitchcock features: The Man Who Knew Too Much (1956) and Vertigo (1958). He received his first Academy Award nomination for Vertigo. In a tribute to Bumstead, the Art Directors Guild said of his work on Vertigo: "Though shot in Technicolor, the film's settings masterfully captured a film-noir style and atmosphere." He again collaborated with Hitchcock on Topaz (1969) and Family Plot (1976).

=== Universal ===
Bumstead left Paramount for Universal Studios in 1961. He won the Academy Award for art direction for his work on To Kill a Mockingbird (1962). Film historian Michael Stephens wrote: "Bumstead's sets not only captured the style of a small town in the South, but also the atmosphere of repression and danger that hovers over the story." Other significant works during Bumstead's years at Universal included Father Goose (1964), The Secret War of Harry Frigg (1968), and The Front Page (1974).

=== Hill collaboration ===
In the 1970s, Bumstead began a lengthy collaboration with director George Roy Hill that was highlighted by The Sting (1973). The film won the Academy Award for best picture, and Bumstead and Hill also received Academy Awards for best director and best art direction. Bumstead's relationship with Hill extended into the late 1980s and included Slaughterhouse-Five (1972), The Great Waldo Pepper (1975), Slap Shot (1977), A Little Romance (1979), The World According to Garp (1982), The Little Drummer Girl (1984), and Funny Farm (1988).

=== Eastwood collaboration ===
Bumstead began a long professional relationship with Clint Eastwood on the 1972 western Joe Kidd. The following year, Eastwood hired Bumstead for his directorial debut in High Plains Drifter (1973). The two worked together on a total of 13 films, including Unforgiven (1992), Midnight in the Garden of Good and Evil (1997), Space Cowboys (2000), Blood Work (2002), Mystic River (2003), and Million Dollar Baby (2004).

Bumstead's final collaboration with Eastwood was on Flags of Our Fathers and Letters from Iwo Jima. Bumstead was 91 years old during the production, and the films were released after Bumstead's death. Flags of Our Fathers includes a dedication to "Bummy" in tribute to Bumstead.

== Family and honors ==
Bumstead was married to his wife, Lena, for 23 years. He had three sons: Robert, Marty, and Steven.

In 1996, Bumstead received the Art Directors Guild's lifetime achievement award. He was also inducted into the Art Directors Guild Hall of Fame.

He died in May 2006 at age 91. He was posthumously inducted into the Art Directors Guild Hall of Fame in 2009.

== Filmography ==
All entries are sourced to the American Film Institute's Henry Bumstead Filmography unless otherwise noted.

- The Story of Dr. Wassell (1944, set design)
- Saigon (1948, art director)
- The Sainted Sisters (1948, art director)
- My Friend Irma (1949, art director)
- My Own True Love (1949, art director)
- Song of Surrender (1949, art director)
- Streets of Laredo (1949, art director)
- Top o' the Morning (1949, art director)
- The Furies (1950, art director)
- My Friend Irma Goes West (1950, art director)
- No Man of Her Own (1950, art director)
- Dear Brat (1951, art director)
- Rhubarg (1951, art director)
- The Redhead and the Cowboy (1951, art director)
- Submarine Command (1951, art director)
- Aaron Slick from Punkin Crick (1952, art director)
- Come Back, Little Sheba (1952, art director)
- Jumping Jacks (1952, art director)
- Sailor Beware (1952, art director)
- Little Boy Lost (1953, art director)
- Money from Home (1953, art director)
- The Stars Are Singing (1953, art director)
- Knock on Wood (1954, art director)
- Lucy Gallant (1955, art director)
- Run for Cover (1955, art director)
- The Bridges at Toko-Ri (1955, art director, production designer)
- Hollywood or Bust (1956, art director)
- The Leather Saint (1956, art director)
- The Man Who Knew Too Much (1956, art director, production designer)
- That Certain Feeling (1956, art director)
- The Vagabond King (1956, art director)
- As Young as We Are (1958, art director)
- I Married a Monster from Outer Space (1958, art director)
- Vertigo (1958, art director, production designer)
- The Hangman (1959, art director)
- The Trap (1959, art director)
- The Bellboy (1960, art director)
- Cinderfella (1960, art director)
- Come September (1961, art director)
- The Great Impostor (1961, art director)
- The Spiral Road (1962, art director)
- To Kill a Mockingbird (1962, art director, production designer)
- A Gathering of Eagles (1963, art director)
- The Brass Bottle (1964, art director)
- Bullet for a Badman (1964, art director)
- Father Goose (1964, art director)
- The War Lord (1965, art director)
- Beau Geste (1966, art director)
- Blindfold (1966, art director)
- Gunpoint (1966, art director)
- Banning (1967, art director)
- The Secret War of Harry Frigg (1967, art director)
- Tobruk (1967, art director)
- What's So Bad About Feeling Good? (1968, art director)
- A Man Called Gannon (1969, art director)
- Tell Them Willie Boy Is Here (1969, art director)
- Topaz (1969, production designer)
- One More Train to Rob (1971, art director)
- Raid on Rommel (1971, art director)
- Joe Kidd (1972, art director)
- Slaughterhouse-Five (1972, art director)
- Showdown (1973, art director)
- The Sting (1973, art director)
- High Plains Drifter (1973, art director)
- The Front Page (1974, art director)
- The Great Waldo Pepper (1975, art director)
- Family Plot (1976, production designer)
- Rollercoaster (1977, production designer)
- Slap Shot (1977, art director)
- House Calls (1978, production designer)
- Same Time, Next Year (1978, production designer)
- A Little Romance (1979, production designer)
- The Concorde ... Airport '79 (1979, production designer)
- Smokey and the Bandit II (1980, production designer)
- The World According to Garp (1982, production designer)
- Harry & Son (1984, production designer)
- The Little Drummer Girl (1984, production designer)
- Warning Sign (1985, production designer)
- Psycho III (1986, production designer)
- Funny Farm (1988, production designer)
- A Time of Destiny (1988, production designer)
- Her Alibi (1989, production designer)
- Almost an Angel (1990, production designer)
- Ghost Dad (1990, production designer)
- Cape Fear (1991, production designer)
- Unforgiven (1992 production designer)
- A Perfect World (1993, production designer)
- The Stars Fell on Henrietta (1995, production designer)
- Absolute Power (1997, production designer)
- Home Alone 3 (1997, production designer)
- Midnight in the Garden of Good and Evil (1997, production designer)
- True Crime (1999, production designer)
- Space Cowboys (2000)
- Blood Work (2002, production designer)
- Mystic River (2003, production designer)
- Million Dollar Baby (2004, production designer)
- Flags of Our Fathers (2006, production designer)
- Letters from Iwo Jima (2006, production designer)

== See also ==
- Art Directors Guild Hall of Fame
