= Artists and Models =

1955 film by Frank Tashlin

- Theatrical release poster
- Directed by: Frank Tashlin
- Screenplay by: Frank Tashlin; Hal Kanter; Herbert Baker; Don McGuire (adaptation)
- Produced by: Hal B. Wallis
- Starring: Dean Martin; Jerry Lewis; Shirley MacLaine; Dorothy Malone; Eddie Mayehoff; Eva Gabor; Anita Ekberg; George "Foghorn" Winslow
- Cinematography: Daniel L. Fapp
- Edited by: Warren Low
- Music by: Walter Scharf
- Distributed by: Paramount Pictures
- Release date: November 7, 1955 (United States)
- Running time: 102 minutes
- Country: United States
- Language: English
- Box office: $3.8 million 1,031,433 admissions (France)

Artists and Models is a 1955 American musical romantic comedy film in VistaVision directed by Frank Tashlin, marking Martin and Lewis's 14th feature together as a team. The film co-stars Shirley MacLaine and Dorothy Malone, with Eva Gabor and Anita Ekberg appearing in brief roles.

== Plot ==
Rick Todd is a struggling painter and smooth-talking ladies' man. His goofy young roommate Eugene Fullstack is an aspiring children's author who has a passion for comic books, especially those of the mysterious and sexy "Bat Lady".

Each night, Eugene has horrific screaming nightmares inspired by those ultra-violent comics, which he describes aloud in his sleep. They are about the bizarre bird-like superhero "Vincent the Vulture" who is, according to Eugene's nocturnal babblings, the "defender of truth and liberty and a member of the Audubon Society" and is "half-boy, half-man, half-bird with feathers growing out of every pore" and a "tail full of jet propulsion". Also known as "Vultureman" or more simply "The Vulture", the golden helmeted hero soars through space from his "homogenized space station" orbiting the Milky Way to battle his shapely but sadistic purple-eyed archenemy "Zuba the Magnificent", who hates Vincent because "she's allergic to his feathers" and who enjoys blasting big "oooozing" holes into his highly resilient flying form ("It'll take more than that to stop me!") with her "atomic pivot gun".

A neighbor in their apartment building, Abigail Parker, is a professional artist who works for a New York comic book company called Murdock Publishing and is the creator of the "Bat Lady". Her energetic horoscope-obsessed roommate is Bessie Sparrowbush, who is secretary to her publisher Mr. Murdock and Abigail's model for the flying bat-masked superheroine. Bessie develops a crush on Eugene, who is unaware that she is his beloved "Bat Lady" in the flesh.

Abigail becomes frustrated at work at the increasingly lurid and bloodthirsty stories the money-hungry Murdock demands. She quits to become an anti-comics activist, dragging Eugene into her crusade as an example of how trashy comic books can warp impressionable minds at the same time that Rick gets a job with the company after pitching the adventures of "Vincent the Vulture" from Eugene's dreams. Rick attains success at his new job, but after falling for Abigail he keeps his work a secret from both her and Eugene.

Unbeknownst to all, Eugene's dreams also contain the real top-secret rocket formula "X34 minus 5R1 plus 6-X36" that Rick publishes in his stories. With spies all around them, they manage to entertain at the annual "Artists and Models Ball" and capture the enemy, preserving national security.

== Cast ==
- Dean Martin as Rick
- Jerry Lewis as Eugene
- Shirley MacLaine as Bessie
- Dorothy Malone as Abigail
- Eddie Mayehoff as Mr. Murdock
- Eva Gabor as Sonia
- Anita Ekberg as Anita
- George "Foghorn" Winslow as Richard Stilton
- Jack Elam as Ivan
- Kathleen Freeman as Mrs. Muldoon
- Herbert Rudley as Secret Service Chief Samuels
- Richard Shannon as Secret Service Agent Rogers
- Richard Webb as Secret Service Agent Peters
- Alan Lee as Otto
- Otto Waldis as Kurt
- Minta Durfee as dancer (uncredited)

== Production ==
Martin and Lewis' 14th feature, Artists and Models, was filmed from February 28 to May 3, 1955, at Paramount Studios. The film was released on November 7, 1955, by Paramount Pictures, and was one of the team's highest-budgeted pictures at $1.5 million ($12,589,869.40 in 2011 dollars). The film was shot in VistaVision and Eastmancolor, with prints by Technicolor, and stereophonic sound by Perspecta. Costumes were by Paramount wardrobe designer Edith Head.

Artists and Models marked the first time Lewis worked with former Looney Tunes director Frank Tashlin, whom he admired greatly. Martin and Lewis would reunite with him on their last film, Hollywood or Bust, and Lewis would then work with Tashlin on six of his solo films.

Producer Hal B. Wallis chose Tashlin for Artists and Models on the basis of his background as a cartoonist, and the film contains many gags influenced by the director's animation work. When MacLaine kisses Lewis in front of a water cooler, the water steams up; in another scene, a massage therapist bends Lewis's leg all the way towards his head. Artists and Models is considered a milestone in movie satire for its mockery of mid-1950s pop culture. One scene satirizes the Kefauver hearings on violent comic books, and other targets in the film include the Cold War, the space race and the publishing business. In the final production number, Rick and Eugene are seen painting on the backs of several chorus girls. This is a sly nod to the film Ugetsu, a breakthrough hit from Japanese cinema, which opened in the U.S. six months before filming began on Artists and Models.

Tashlin brought a lot of sexual innuendo to Artists and Models, making it more adult in content than most previous Martin and Lewis movies and indulging his own fetishistic fascination with female characters in revealing costumes. Some of his most suggestive ideas were disallowed by the Production Code; in Tashlin's original script, Lewis's character was named "Fullstick", but the censors ordered the removal of this phallic joke. The censors also asked Paramount to cut a scene where Dorothy Malone is seen wearing only a strategically placed towel, but the studio did not remove it. The finished film contains many jokes that push the boundaries of what was acceptable in the mid-1950s, including many about women's breasts and a number of double entendres.

Longtime Martin and Lewis writer Herbert Baker worked on the script, which had the original title Rock-A-Bye Baby; the title later being used for a 1958 Jerry Lewis film.

Songs featured were by music legends Harry Warren and Jack Brooks, and included "When You Pretend", "You Look So Familiar", "Innamorata (Sweetheart)", "The Lucky Song", and "Artists and Models". A sixth number, sung by Shirley MacLaine during the party, entitled "The Bat Lady", was cut from the final edit.

MacLaine did not make another film with Lewis, but did go on to appear in six more films with Martin, Some Came Running, Ocean's Eleven, Career, All in a Night's Work, What a Way to Go! and Cannonball Run II.

According to a 1955 column by Sheilah Graham, the part of Abby was originally offered to Lizabeth Scott, who had played opposite the team in Scared Stiff. When she turned the part down, Martin asked for Dorothy Malone, his other love interest from Scared Stiff.

The cast is filled with cameos by many Martin and Lewis regulars. Eddie Mayehoff made his cinematic debut in That's My Boy and co-starred in The Stooge. Kathleen Freeman also appeared in 3 Ring Circus, along with a number of Lewis' solo films. Jack Elam was in the team's second-to-last picture, Pardners. Anita Ekberg would appear in Martin and Lewis' final film, Hollywood or Bust.

The "Vincent the Vulture" comic books made as a prop for this picture briefly appear in the unaired pilot for the television series Get Smart.

== Home media ==
The film was included on the five-film DVD set the Dean Martin and Jerry Lewis Collection: Volume Two, released on June 5, 2007. It was released on its own on March 13, 2020.

== Reception ==
On the review aggregator website Rotten Tomatoes, 85% of 13 critics' reviews are positive, with an average rating of 6.3/10.
