= That's Amore =

1953 song by composer Harry Warren and lyricist Jack Brooks

Single by Dean Martin

from the album Dean Martin Sings
- B-side: "You're The Right One"
- Released: November 7, 1953
- Recorded: August 13, 1953 at Capitol Studios, Hollywood
- Genre: Traditional pop
- Length: 3:05
- Label: Capitol
- Composer: Harry Warren
- Lyricist: Jack Brooks

Dean Martin singles chronology
"Kiss" (1953)	"That's Amore" (1953)	"I'd Cry Like a Baby" (1954)

"That's Amore" is a 1953 song by composer Harry Warren and lyricist Jack Brooks, and became a major hit and signature song for Dean Martin, who first recorded and released it that year. The song describes the feeling of being in love through playful and stereotypical imagery associated with Italian culture, particularly that of the city of Naples, such as music, scenery and food. Amore (pronounced [aˈmoːre]) means "love" in Italian.

== History ==
The song first appeared in the soundtrack of the Martin and Lewis comedy film The Caddy, released by Paramount Pictures on August 10, 1953. Lewis commissioned Warren and Brooks to write songs for Martin to sing in the movie. According to Lewis, he personally paid them $30,000 secretly in the hope that one would be a hit for Martin. In the film the song is performed mainly by Martin, with Lewis joining in and then the other characters in the scene follow. It received a nomination for the Academy Award for Best Original Song of that year, but it lost to "Secret Love" from Calamity Jane starring Doris Day. In June 1995 the song was performed by the Greek singer Kostas Macedonas and Chorus.

The song remains closely identified with Dean Martin. That's Amore was used as the title for a 2001 video retrospective of Martin's career; and his son, Ricci Martin, titled his 2002 biography That's Amore: A Son Remembers Dean Martin. As an iconic song, "That's Amore" remains a secondary signature song for Dean Martin (second only to "Everybody Loves Somebody" of 1964).

Music critic Joe Queenan has described the song as "A charming, if goofy, parody of popular Neapolitan organ-grinder music", and observed "That's Amore was one of many songs from the early Fifties that helped rehabilitate Italy's image as a land of magic and romance that had somehow been lured from its festive moorings by the glum fascist Benito Mussolini."

== Chart performance ==
The track that was used for the single released by Capitol Records was recorded on August 13, 1953, (Session 3098; Master 11694-6) at Capitol Records' studios at 5505 Melrose Avenue, Hollywood, California, with the orchestra conducted by Dick Stabile. On November 7, 1953, Martin's record of the song, with "You're the Right One" (which was recorded at the same session as "That's Amore") on the flip side, peaked at No. 2 on the Billboard charts.

== Certifications ==
Region	Certification	Certified units/sales
New Zealand (RMNZ)	Gold	15,000^{‡}
United States (RIAA)	Platinum	1,000,000^{‡}
^{‡} Sales+streaming figures based on certification alone.
