= Joe Gray (actor) =

American boxer, actor, and stuntman (1912–1971)

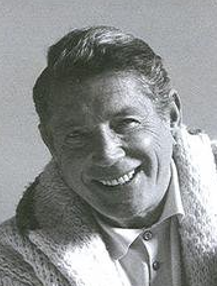
- Born: May 5, 1912; Brooklyn, New York, U.S.
- Died: March 15, 1971 (aged 58); Durango, Mexico
- Occupations: Actor, stuntman, boxer
- Years active: 1937–1971
- Relatives: Jon Abrahams (great-nephew)
- Family: Mack Gray (brother)

Joe Gray (May 5, 1912 – March 15, 1971) was an American boxer, actor, and stuntman.

== Biography ==
Joe Gray, born Joseph Greenberg, was born and raised in Brooklyn, New York.

He moved to Los Angeles in 1936 at the suggestion of his brother Mack Gray, George Raft's associate. His film career included some of the most iconic boxing films ever made (Golden Boy, City for Conquest, Body and Soul, Champion). He made appearances in over 130 films in numerous uncredited roles, including 12 of Frank Sinatra's films and 32 of Dean Martin's films. Gray was Martin's stunt double in all of Martin's films through 1971. He was a technical adviser on boxing films for John Garfield, Elvis Presley, Jeff Chandler, James Cagney, George Raft, Tony Curtis, and Kirk Douglas, among others. Gray also trained and advised the actor, John Derek in the 1956 film The Leather Saint.

As a boxer, Gray compiled a professional boxing record of 8-3-2 with 3 knockout wins. In his private life he was a close friend of the writer Henry Miller, and Gray appeared in and contributed to The Henry Miller Odyssey, a 90-minute color documentary. After Gray's death, Miller dedicated a chapter of his 1973 book, My Bike and Other Friends, to Gray. as well as several pages in Miller's large autobiographical book My Life and Times.

Gray was the brother of Mack Gray and uncle of the artist Martin Abrahams and great-uncle of actor Jon Abrahams. Gray died in Mexico while on location making the film Something Big in Durango, at the age of 58. He was buried in Los Angeles at Mount Sinai Memorial Park Cemetery.

== Selected filmography ==
- A Star Is Born (1937) – Garcia (uncredited)
- The Big Broadcast of 1938 (1938) – Sailor (uncredited)
- Mr. Moto's Gamble (1938) – Fighter (uncredited)
- You and Me (1938) – Red (uncredited)
- Winner Take All (1939) – Nick – Brawler (uncredited)
- Each Dawn I Die (1939) – Prisoner (uncredited)
- Beau Geste (1939) – Legionnaire (uncredited)
- Golden Boy (1939) – Fighter (uncredited)
- Call a Messenger (1939) – Nail (uncredited)
- City for Conquest (1940) – Cannonball Wales (uncredited)
- Knockout (1941) – Kent, a Fighter (uncredited)
- The Miracle Kid (1941) – Kayo Kane
- Broadway (1942) – Bootlegger (uncredited)
- Yankee Doodle Dandy (1942) – (uncredited)
- Mr. Ace (1946) – 'Gentleman' Gene Delmont (uncredited)
- Mr. Hex (1946) – Billy Butterworth
- Criminal Court (1946) – First Gunman (uncredited)
- Intrigue (1947) – Hotel Guest (uncredited)
- Christmas Eve (1947) – Minor Role (uncredited)
- Body and Soul (1947) – Cornerman (uncredited)
- It Had to Be You (1947) – Prizefighter (uncredited)
- The Street with No Name (1948) – Boxer (uncredited)
- Fighter Squadron (1948) – Flyer with Dice (uncredited)
- Whiplash (1948) – Fighter (uncredited)
- The Accused (1949) – Abe Comar (uncredited)
- Fighting Fools (1949) – Fighter (uncredited)
- Champion (1949) – Opponent, Championship Fight (uncredited)
- Sorrowful Jones (1949) – Gambler (uncredited)
- Mighty Joe Young (1949) – Waiter (uncredited)
- The Big Wheel (1949) – Race Car Driver (uncredited)
- Wabash Avenue (1950) – Saloon Patron (uncredited)
- Riding High (1950) – Johnny (uncredited)
- The Jackie Robinson Story (1950) – Dalby (uncredited)
- Love That Brute (1950) – Gangster (uncredited)
- My Friend Irma Goes West (1950) – (uncredited)
- 711 Ocean Drive (1950) – Boxer (uncredited)
- Sunset Boulevard (1950) – Minor Role (uncredited)
- At War with the Army (1950) – Soldier (uncredited)
- Ace in the Hole (1951) – Minor Role (uncredited)
- No Questions Asked (1951) – Policeman (uncredited)
- Iron Man (1951) – Minor Role (uncredited)
- Rhubarb (1951) – Baseball Player (uncredited)
- Flesh and Fury (1952) – Cliff
- Kid Monk Baroni (1952) – Fighter (uncredited)
- Glory Alley (1952) – Fighter (uncredited)
- Sally and Saint Anne (1952) – Crunch (uncredited)
- Off Limits (1952) – Dix (uncredited)
- The War of the Worlds (1953) – Looter (uncredited)
- Scared Stiff (1953) – Longshoreman (uncredited)
- The Beast from 20,000 Fathoms (1953) – Longshoreman (uncredited)
- The Caddy (1953) – Pool Guest (uncredited)
- Casanova's Big Night (1954) – Court Guard (uncredited)
- 3 Ring Circus (1954) – Circus Roustabout (uncredited)
- Six Bridges to Cross (1955) – Mobster (uncredited)
- Guys and Dolls (1955) – Spectator at Hot Box Club (uncredited)
- The Square Jungle (1955) – Sparring Partner (uncredited)
- The Leather Saint (1956) – Referee in Gil's Third Bout (uncredited)
- Pardners (1956) – Rodeo Cowboy (uncredited)
- Back from Eternity (1956) – Gambler (uncredited)
- The Ten Commandments (1956) – Palace Guard (uncredited)
- Hollywood or Bust (1956) – Gambler (uncredited)
- Hot Shots (1956) – Sam (uncredited)
- Jailhouse Rock (1957)
- Ten Thousand Bedrooms (1957) – Minor Role (uncredited)
- The Fuzzy Pink Nightgown (1957) – Airport Passenger (uncredited)
- Sweet Smell of Success (1957) – Patron at 21 Club (uncredited)
- Loving You (1957) – Minor Role (uncredited)
- The Joker Is Wild (1957) – Fighter (uncredited)
- Hear Me Good (1957) – Technician (uncredited)
- King Creole (1958)
- The Young Lions (1958) – Soldier (uncredited)
- Rock-A-Bye Baby (1958) – Doctor (uncredited)
- I Married a Monster from Outer Space (1958) – Alien (uncredited)
- The Buccaneer (1958) – Stevedore (uncredited)
- Some Came Running (1958) – Minor Role (uncredited)
- Rio Bravo (1959) – Card Player (uncredited)
- Some Like It Hot (1959) – Mobster at Banquet (uncredited)
- The Great Impostor (1960) – Federal Prison Inmate (uncredited)
- Bells Are Ringing (1960) – Bartender (uncredited)
- Ocean's 11 (1960) – Pit Boss (uncredited)
- G.I. Blues (1960) – Soldier (uncredited)
- The Great Impostor (1960) – Federal Prison Inmate (uncredited)
- Ada (1961) – Reporter (uncredited)
- Breakfast at Tiffany's (1961) – Party Guest (uncredited)
- The Comancheros (1961) – Party Guest (uncredited)
- The Errand Boy (1961) – Minor Role (uncredited)
- The Ladies Man (1961) – Man on Date (scenes deleted)
- Sergeants 3 (1962) – (uncredited)
- Kid Galahad (1962) – Trainer (uncredited)
- The Manchurian Candidate (1962) – Soldier (uncredited)
- Taras Bulba (1962) – Soldier (uncredited)
- Who's Got the Action? (1962) – Pool Player (uncredited)
- 40 Pounds of Trouble (1962) – Gambler (uncredited)
- Bye Bye Birdie (1963) – TV Director (uncredited)
- Irma la Douce (1963) – Bar Gangster (uncredited)
- Toys in the Attic (1963) – Man at Bar (uncredited)
- Who's Minding the Store? (1963) – Herman, the Shoplifter (uncredited)
- 4 for Texas (1963) – Cowboy (uncredited)
- What a Way to Go! (1964) – Patron (uncredited)
- Robin and the 7 Hoods (1964) – Hood (uncredited)
- For Those Who Think Young (1964) – Club Guest (uncredited)
- Kiss Me, Stupid (1964) – (uncredited)
- None But the Brave (1965) – Soldier (uncredited)
- Von Ryan's Express (1965) – Prisoner (uncredited)
- Harlow (1965) – Director (uncredited)
- Boeing Boeing (1965) – Minor Role (uncredited)
- Our Man Flint (1966) – Security Guard (uncredited)
- The Silencers (1966) – (uncredited)
- The Last of the Secret Agents? (1966) – (uncredited)
- Murderers' Row (1966) – Guard (uncredited)
- Good Times (1967) – (uncredited)
- The Ambushers (1967) – Man (uncredited)
- How to Save a Marriage and Ruin Your Life (1968) – Cab Driver (uncredited)
- Bandolero! (1968) – (uncredited)
- 5 Card Stud (1968) – Cowhand (uncredited)
- The Legend of Lylah Clare (1968) – Minor Role (uncredited)
- The Killing of Sister George (1968) – Party Guest (uncredited)
- The Wrecking Crew (1968) – Minor Role (uncredited)
- Che! (1969) – (uncredited)
- Airport (1970) – Antonio Piace – Passenger (uncredited)
- Escape from the Planet of the Apes (1971) – Bodyguard (uncredited)
- Something Big (1971) – (uncredited) (final film role)
