= You're Never Too Young =

1955 American comedy film directed by Norman Taurog

You’re Never Too Young
- Directed by: Norman Taurog
- Screenplay by: Sidney Sheldon
- Based on: Sunny Goes Home; 1921 story in The Saturday Evening Post by Fannie Kilbourne; Connie Goes Home; 1923 play by Edward Childs Carpenter
- Produced by: Paul Jones
- Starring: Dean Martin; Jerry Lewis; Diana Lynn; Nina Foch; Raymond Burr
- Cinematography: Daniel L. Fapp
- Edited by: Archie Marshek
- Music by: Walter Scharf
- Distributed by: Paramount Pictures
- Release date: August 25, 1955
- Running time: 102 minutes
- Country: United States
- Language: English
- Box office: $3.4 million (US); 2,202,595 admissions (France)

You’re Never Too Young is a 1955 American semi-musical comedy film directed by Norman Taurog and starring the team of Martin and Lewis and co-starring Diana Lynn, Nina Foch, and Raymond Burr. It was released on August 25, 1955, by Paramount Pictures.

== Plot ==
A valuable diamond is stolen at a Los Angeles hotel and a man guarding it is killed. The thief, Noonan, hides it from police, first in the jacket of a customer, Bob Miles, and then in the pocket of a barber's apprentice, Wilbur Hoolick.

Wilbur, boarding a train to go home to Blitzen, Washington, pretends to be an eleven-year-old in order to purchase a ticket for half price. Noonan sits beside him, still trying to retrieve the stolen jewel. Wilbur gets the impression that the thief is a jealous husband. He hides in the compartment of Nancy Collins, a teacher at a private girls' school. Feeling sorry for "young" Wilbur traveling alone, she allows him to stay there for the duration of the train ride.

During a stop-over, Gretchen Brendan, the jealous daughter of the school's headmistress, boards the train and finds out that Nancy is sharing her compartment with "a man." Gretchen hurries to the school to let Nancy's fiancée, Bob, in on this news, then tries to get Nancy dismissed. In order to protect Nancy's job and reputation, Wilbur must continue the charade of pretending to be a child. He accompanies "Aunt Nancy" to the all-girl school. The jewel thief follows them.

Along the way, Wilbur falls in love with Nancy, although she still thinks of him as a little boy. Noonan pretends to be Wilbur's father and regains possession of the diamond. But the police have arrived and a speedboat chase ensues. In the end, the thief is captured and Wilbur's identity is revealed. Nancy still loves Bob, but he is off to join the Army and discovers that Wilbur is his barber.

== Cast ==
- Dean Martin as Bob Miles
- Jerry Lewis as Wilbur Hoolick
- Diana Lynn as Nancy Collins
- Nina Foch as Gretchen Brendan
- Raymond Burr as Noonan
- Tommy Ivo as Marty
- Nancy Kulp as Marty's mother
- Veda Ann Borg as Noonan's wife
- Mitzi McCall as Skeets
- Emory Parnell as Train Conductor
- Margery Maude as Mrs. Ella Brennan
- Milton Frome as Lt. O'Malley
- Bobby Barber as Train Station Newsstand Clerk
- James Burke as Pullman Conductor
- Hans Conried as Francois
- Robert Carson as Tailor
- Franklyn Farnum as Man in Ticket Line
- Bess Flowers as Extra in Lobby
- Tommy Ivo as Marty
- Tor Johnson as Train Passenger
- Hank Mann as Train Passenger
- Peggy Moffitt as Agnes
- Paul Newlan as Husky Man at Train Station
- Emory Parnell as Train Conductor
- Isabel Randolph as Teacher
- Dick Simmons as Professor

== Production ==
You're Never Too Young was filmed from October 18 to December 27, 1954. This film is a gender-swapped remake of another Paramount film, The Major and the Minor (1942), directed by Billy Wilder — his first American film as director — and co-written by Wilder and Charles Brackett. Both films were adapted from the play Connie Goes Home by Edward Childs Carpenter.

Diana Lynn previously appeared with Martin and Lewis in their first film, My Friend Irma (1949), as well as its sequel, My Friend Irma Goes West (1950). She is also featured in The Major and the Minor, which You're Never Too Young is based on.

== Re-release ==
In 1964, Paramount re-released You're Never Too Young with another Martin and Lewis film, The Caddy (1953).

== Home media ==
The film was included on a five-film DVD set, the Dean Martin and Jerry Lewis Collection: Volume Two, released on June 5, 2007.
