= Polly Bergen =

American actress (1930–2014)

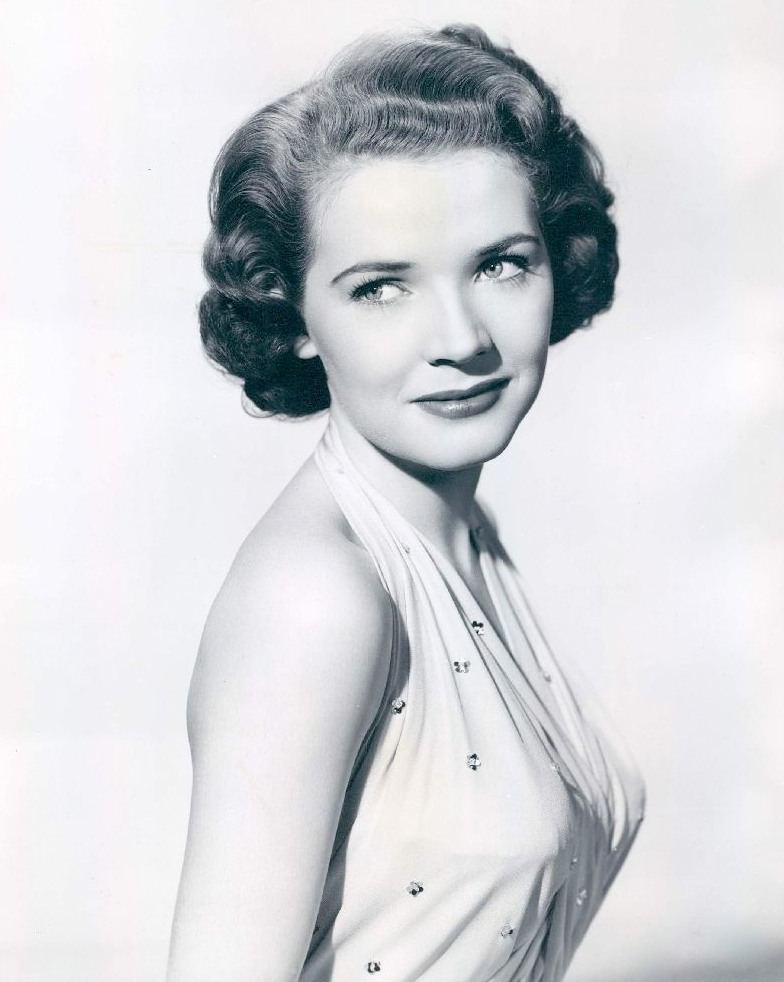
- Bergen in 1953
- Born: Nellie Paulina Burgin; July 14, 1930; Knoxville, Tennessee, U.S.
- Died: September 20, 2014 (aged 84); Southbury, Connecticut, U.S.
- Occupations: Actress; singer
- Years active: 1949–2014
- Spouses: Jerome Courtland (m. 1950; div. 1955); Freddie Fields (m. 1957; div. 1975); Jeffrey Endervelt (m. 1982; div. 1990)
- Children: 3, including Kathy Fields (stepchild)

Polly Bergen (born Nellie Paulina Burgin; July 14, 1930 – September 20, 2014) was an American actress and singer. She won an Emmy Award in 1958 for her performance as Helen Morgan in Helen Morgan (Playhouse 90). For her stage work, she was nominated for the Tony Award for Best Featured Actress in a Musical for her performance as Carlotta Campion in Follies in 2001. Her film work included Cape Fear (1962) and The Caretakers (1963), for which she was nominated for the Golden Globe Award for Best Actress in a Motion Picture – Drama. She hosted her own weekly variety show for one season (The Polly Bergen Show), was a regular panelist on the TV game show To Tell the Truth, and later in life had roles in The Sopranos and Desperate Housewives. She wrote three books on beauty, fashion, and charm. She is also the inspiration behind Mother Goose in The Land of Stories.

== Early life ==
Bergen was born in Knoxville, Tennessee, to Lucy (née Lawhorne; 1909–1985) and William Hugh Burgin (1909–1982), a construction engineer. Bill Bergen, as he was later known, had singing talent and appeared with his daughter in several episodes of her 18-episode comedy/variety show The Polly Bergen Show, which aired during the 1957–1958 television season to much fanfare. They released a duet Columbia LP, Polly and Her Pop.

== Career ==
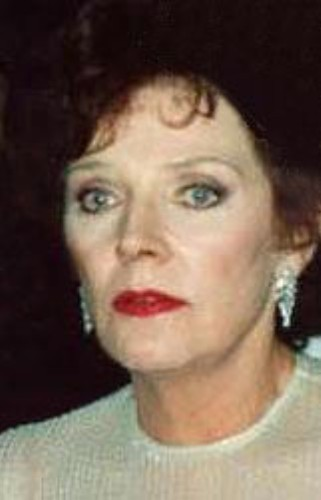
Bergen at the 1989 Emmy Awards

Bergen appeared in many film roles, most notably in the original Cape Fear (1962) opposite Gregory Peck and Robert Mitchum. She had roles as the romantic interest in three Dean Martin and Jerry Lewis comedy films in the early 1950s: At War with the Army, That's My Boy, and The Stooge. She was featured in a number of Westerns during the 1950s, including Warpath, Arena, and Escape from Fort Bravo. She starred in the horse-racing comedy Fast Company; she starred as the first female United States President in Kisses for My President; and as the wife of James Garner in the romantic comedy Move Over, Darling, which also starred Doris Day. Bergen's later roles included Mrs. Vernon-Williams in Cry-Baby, a John Waters film.

Bergen received an Emmy Award for her portrayal of the true-life title subject in the episode "Helen Morgan" of the 1950s television series Playhouse 90. Signed to Columbia Records, she also enjoyed a successful recording career during this era. She recorded an album in 1957 titled, Bergen Sings Morgan, which included the song "Bill".

In the 1950s, she became known as "the Pepsi Cola Girl", having done a series of commercials for this product.

She was a regular panelist on the game show To Tell the Truth during its original run. She was an occasional panelist and appeared three times as the mystery guest on What's My Line?. She appeared on the interview program Here's Hollywood. She earned two Emmy Award nominations for her role as Rhoda Henry, wife of Captain "Pug" Henry (played by Robert Mitchum), in two miniseries: The Winds of War and its sequel War and Remembrance.

Bergen starred in a 2001 Broadway revival of Stephen Sondheim's Follies at the Belasco Theater and received a Tony Award nomination as Best Featured Actress in a Musical. In 2003, she starred at the same theatre in Six Dance Lessons in Six Weeks opposite Mark Hamill in a role she took over from Rue McClanahan.

In 2004, Bergen played Fran Felstein on HBO's The Sopranos, the fictional former mistress of Johnny Soprano and John F. Kennedy. From 2007 to 2011, Bergen had a guest role in Desperate Housewives as Stella Wingfield, which earned her an Emmy Award nomination.

She was a semi-regular cast member of Commander-in-Chief (2006) as the mother of Mackenzie Allen, the fictional president of the United States played by Geena Davis. Bergen had once played the first female president of the United States herself in Kisses for My President (1964). Another late appearance came in the Hallmark Hall of Fame presentation Candles on Bay Street (2006), in which she played the assistant to a husband-and-wife team of veterinarians.

In 1965, Bergen created the Polly Bergen Company cosmetics line, also known as Oil of the Turtle. She also created lines of jewelry and shoe brands, and wrote three books on beauty. She had retail stores in Knoxville and Gatlinburg bearing her name.

== Personal life ==
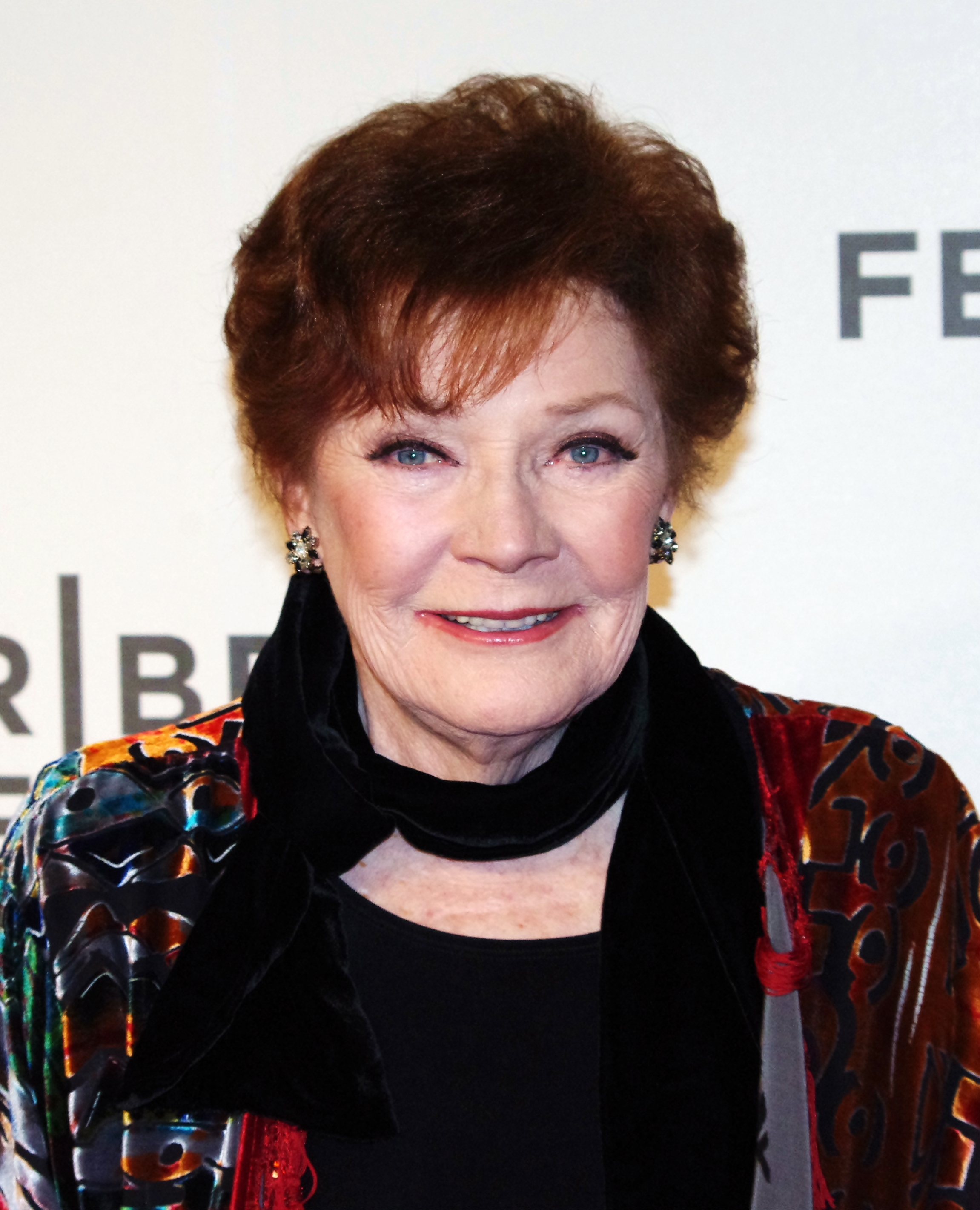
Bergen in 2012

Bergen was married to actor Jerome Courtland from 1950 to 1955. In 1957, she married Hollywood agent-producer Freddie Fields, with whom she had two adoptive children, Pamela Kerry Fields and Peter William Fields, and stepdaughter, Kathy Fields. Bergen converted from Southern Baptist to Judaism upon marrying Fields. The couple divorced in 1975. She was married to entrepreneur Jeffrey Endervelt in the 1980s.

In 1991, Bergen spoke about having had an abortion, for inclusion in the book The Choices We Made: Twenty-Five Women and Men Speak Out About Abortion.

On March 31, 1993, Brandon Lee died accidentally on the set of The Crow, and in early April, Bergen held a memorial at her home in Los Angeles with 200 of Lee's family, friends, and business associates in attendance.

Bergen was a liberal-minded, politically active Democrat and feminist. She was an active advocate of the Equal Rights Amendment, women's education, and Planned Parenthood. Bergen's niece is television producer Wendy Riche.

== Death ==
Bergen died of natural causes on September 20, 2014, at her home in Southbury, Connecticut, surrounded by family and close friends. She had been diagnosed with emphysema and other ailments in the late 1990s. Upon her death, she was cremated.

== Filmography ==
=== Film ===
Year	Title	Role	Notes
1949	Champion	Singer	uncredited
1949	Across the Rio Grande	Singer	(as Polly Burgin)
1950	The Men	Singer	uncredited
1950	At War with the Army	Helen Palmer	a Martin & Lewis comedy
1951	That's My Boy	Betty 'Babs' Hunter	a Martin & Lewis comedy
1951	Warpath	Molly Quade	
1952	The Stooge	Mary Turner	a Martin & Lewis comedy
1953	Cry of the Hunted	Janet Tunner	
1953	Half a Hero	herself - guest appearance	
1953	Fast Company	Carol Maldon	
1953	Arena	Ruth Danvers	
1953	Escape from Fort Bravo	Alice Owens	
1954	The Blue Angel	herself - host	
1962	Cape Fear	Peggy Bowden	
1963	The Caretakers	Lorna Melford	nominated—Golden Globe Award for Best Actress – Motion Picture Drama
1963	Move Over, Darling	Bianca Steele	
1964	Kisses for My President	U.S. President Leslie Harrison McCloud	
1967	A Guide for the Married Man	Technical Adviser (Clara Brown)	
1984	Velvet	Mrs. Vance	
1987	Making Mr. Right	Estelle Stone	
1989	Mother, Mother	Barbara Cutler	short film
1990	Cry-Baby	Mrs. Vernon-Williams	directed by John Waters
1995	Dr. Jekyll and Ms. Hyde	Mrs. Unterveldt	
1995	Once Upon a Time... When We Were Colored	Miss Maybry	
2005	Paradise, Texas	Beverly Cameron	
2006	A Very Serious Person	Mrs. A	
2012	Struck by Lightning	Grandma	

=== Television ===
Year	Title	Role	Notes
1954	Your Hit Parade	singing ‘Mountain Scenery’	aired October 16
1954–55	The Pepsi-Cola Playhouse	herself / host	
1956–61	To Tell the Truth	herself	165 episodes
1957	Playhouse 90	Helen Morgan	"The Helen Morgan Story" (episode 33); Primetime Emmy Award for Outstanding Lead Actress in a Miniseries or a Movie
1957–58	The Polly Bergen Show	herself	18 episodes
1960	The George Burns Show	herself	Guest
1961	Alfred Hitchcock Presents	Crystal Coe	Season 6 Episode 30: "You Can't Trust a Man"
1961	Wagon Train	Kitty Allbright	Season 5 Episode 2: "The Kitty Allbright Story"
1962	What's My Line	herself	episode: January 28, 1962
1962	Belle Sommers	Belle Sommers	TV movie
1967	The Red Skelton Show	Myrtle (Bolivar's fiancée)	Season 17 Episode 12: "Red's Relatives"
1973	Thriller	Suzy Hunter	Season 1 Episode 4: "An Echo of Theresa"
1974	Death Cruise	Sylvia Carter	TV movie
1975	Murder on Flight 502	Mona Briarly	TV movie
1976	Ellery Queen	Dina Carroll-Winer	Season 1 Episode 19: "The Tyrant of Tin Pan Alley"
1977	79 Park Avenue	Vera Keppler	TV movie
1977	Telethon	Dorothy Goodwin	TV movie
1978	How to Pick Up Girls!	Dana Greenberg	TV movie
1981	The Million Dollar Face	Jo Burns	TV movie
1982	Born Beautiful	Marion Carmody	TV movie
1982	The Love Boat	Dana Pierce	3 episodes
1983	The Winds of War	Rhoda Henry	miniseries (6 episodes) nominated – Primetime Emmy Award for Outstanding Supporting Actress in a Miniseries or a Movie
1984	Fantasy Island	Esther Brandell	Season 7 Episode 14: "Lady of the House/Mrs. Brandell's Favorites"
1985	Hotel	Elizabeth Hastings	Season 2 Episode 19: "Images"
1985	Murder, She Wrote	Dr. Jocelyn Laird	Season 2 Episode 4: "School for Scandal"
1988	Addicted to His Love	Vivien Langford	TV movie
1988	She Was Marked for Murder	Laura Lee Webster	TV movie
1988–89	War and Remembrance	Rhoda Henry	miniseries (6 episodes) nominated – Primetime Emmy Award for Outstanding Supporting Actress in a Miniseries or a Movie
1988	My Two Dads	Evelyn Taylor	Season 1 Episode 13: "Joey's Mother-in-Law"
1989	Jake and the Fatman	Emma Julian	Season 3 Episode 18: "By Myself"
1989	The Haunting of Sarah Hardy	Emily Stepford	TV movie
1989	My Brother's Wife	Myra Gilbert	TV movie
1990	Steel Magnolias	Clairee Belcher	unsold pilot
1991	Lightning Field	Carol	TV movie
1991–92	Baby Talk	Doris Campbell	23 episodes
1992	Lady Against the Odds	Cleo Storrs	TV movie
1993	Arly Hanks	Ruby Bee	TV movie
1994	Burke's Law	Rachel Doucet	Season 1 Episode 1: "Who Killed the Starlet?"
1995	The Surrogate	Sandy Gilman	TV movie
1996	In the Blink of an Eye	Murial	TV movie
1996	For Hope	Molly Altman	TV movie
1998	Touched by an Angel	Stella	Season 4 Episode 13: "Deconstructing Harry"
2004	The Sopranos	Fran Felstein	Season 5 Episode 7: "In Camelot"
2005–06	Commander in Chief	Kate Allen	10 episodes
2006	Candles on Bay Street	Rosemary	TV movie
2007–11	Desperate Housewives	Stella Wingfield	10 episodes nominated – Primetime Emmy Award for Outstanding Guest Actress in a Comedy Series; Satellite Award for Best Supporting Actress – Series, Miniseries or Television Film

=== Stage ===
Year	Title	Role	Notes
1953	John Murray Anderson's Almanac	Meg	Imperial Theatre, Broadway
1955	Champagne Complex	Allyn Macy	Cort Theatre, Broadway
1959	First Impressions	Elizabeth Bennett	Alvin Theatre, Broadway
1989	Love Letters	Melissa Gardener (Replacement)	Edison Theatre, Broadway
2001	Follies	Carlotta Campion	Belasco Theatre, Broadway
2002	Cabaret	Fraulein Schneider (Repplacement)	Henry Miller Theatre, Broadway
2003	Six Dance Lessons in Six Weeks	Lily Harrison	Belasco Theatre, Broadway
2007	Camille Claudel	Older Camille	Goodspeed Opera House
2008	A Little Night Music	Madame Armfeldt	Baltimore Center Stage

== Radio appearances ==
Year	Title	Episode	Ref.
1952	Musical Comedy Theater	"On an Island with You"	

== Discography ==
Albums list adapted from AllMusic and Discogs.

=== Albums ===
- 1955: Little Girl Blue (10-inch LP)
- 1956: The Girls
- 1956: Today's Hits (EP)
- 1957: Bergen Sings Morgan (Billboard 200 – No. 10)
- 1957: The Party's Over (Billboard 200 – No. 20)
- 1958: Polly and Her Pop (accompanied on guitar & vocals by her father, Bill Bergen)
- 1959: My Heart Sings – Columbia #CS 8018 – orchestra conducted by Luther Henderson (re-released in 1996)
- 1959: All Alone by the Telephone
- 1959: First Impressions – with Farley Granger and Hermione Gingold
- 1960: Four Seasons of Love
- 1961: Sings the Hit Songs from Do-Re-Mi and Annie Get Your Gun
- 1963: Act One, Sing Too

=== Singles ===
- 1958: "Come Prima" (Billboard Hot 100 – No. 67)

== Bibliography ==
- Bergen, Polly (1962). The Polly Bergen Book of Beauty, Fashion, and Charm. Prentice Hall. ASIN B0007E27RS.
- Bergen, Polly (1974). Polly's Principles: Polly Bergen Tells You how You Can Feel and Look as Young as She Does. Bantam Books. ISBN 978-0-8832-6073-9.
- Bergen, Polly (1978). I'd Love To, but What'll I Wear. G. P. Putnam's Sons. ISBN 978-0-8722-3523-6.
