= At War with the Army =

1950 film by Hal Walker

- 1958 theatrical reissue poster
- Directed by: Hal Walker
- Screenplay by: Fred Finklehoffe
- Based on: At War With the Army; 1949 play by James Allardice
- Produced by: Fred Finklehoffe
- Starring: Dean Martin; Jerry Lewis; Mike Kellin; Jimmy Dundee; Polly Bergen
- Cinematography: Stuart Thompson
- Edited by: Paul Weatherwax
- Music by: Joseph J. Lilley
- Production companies: Fred F. Finklehoffe Productions; Screen Associates Inc. York Pictures Corporation
- Distributed by: Paramount Pictures
- Release dates: December 31, 1950 (San Francisco); January 24, 1951 (New York); February 1, 1951 (Los Angeles)
- Running time: 93 minutes
- Country: United States
- Language: English
- Budget: less than $500,000 or $420,000
- Box office: $3.3 million (US rentals); 1,464,218 admissions (France)

The full film

At War with the Army is a 1950 American musical comedy film directed by Hal Walker and released by Paramount Pictures. It stars the comedy team of Martin and Lewis and introduces Polly Bergen. Filmed from July through August 1949, the film premiered in San Francisco on New Year's Eve 1950 before opening nationwide on January 17, 1951. It was rereleased in 1958 by OMAT Pictures.

== Plot ==
In a United States Army base in Kentucky at the end of 1944 during World War II, First Sergeant Vic Puccinelli and Private First Class Alvin Korwin, who were partners in a nightclub song-and-dance act, enlist.

Puccinelli wants to be transferred from his dull job to active duty overseas, but he is refused transfer and is to be promoted to the rank of warrant officer. Korwin wants a pass to see his wife and new baby. In addition, they have to rehearse for the base talent show and avoid the wrath of Alvin's platoon sergeant McVey. They sing songs and perform an impression of Bing Crosby and Barry Fitzgerald by recreating a scene from Going My Way (1944) for the talent show.

== Cast ==
- Dean Martin as 1st Sgt. Vic Puccinelli
- Jerry Lewis as PFC Alvin Korwin
- Mike Kellin as Sgt. McVey
- Angela Greene as Mrs. Deborah Caldwell
- Tommy Farrell as Cpl. Clark
- Polly Bergen as Helen Palmer
- Jean Ruth as Millie
- William Mendrek as Capt. Ernest Caldwell
- Douglas Evans as Col. Davis
- Kenneth Forbes as 2nd Lt Davenport
- Danny Dayton as Supply Sgt. Miller
- Paul Livermore as Pvt. Jack Edwards
- Frank Hyers as Cpl. Shaughnessy
- Ty Perry as Lt. Terrey
- Jimmie Dundee as Eddie
- Dick Stabile as Pvt. Pokey
- Dewey Robinson as Bartender
- Joe Gray as Soldier

== Production ==
The film is based on a three-act farcical play by James B. Allardice that ran for 151 performances at the Booth Theatre on Broadway from March 8, 1949, to July 16, 1949. The film rights were sold in June 1949 for $50,000 to producer Fred F. Finklehoffe, who wrote the screenplay. Finklehoffe originally intended to produce the film in New York with exteriors to be shot at a local military base. However, it was filmed at Corriganville Movie Ranch from July to August 1949.

Dean Martin's character of Vic Puccinelli was named Robert Johnson in the stage production, in which it was played by Gary Merrill. Two characters from the play were combined to create Jerry Lewis's character.

Following the release At War with the Army in 1951, Martin and Lewis became embroiled in a legal battle with Screen Associates, Inc., for whom they had agreed to create seven films through the duo's own company, York Productions. Screen Associates sued York Productions and producer Hal Wallis for breach of contract, arguing that Martin and Lewis refused to make the remaining six films after the release of At War with the Army and that they had violated an agreement to alternate between productions for Wallis and Screen Associates when they appeared in two consecutive films (That's My Boy and The Stooge) for Wallis. Screen Associates sought an injunction preventing Martin and Lewis from starring in another planned Wallis production, At Sea with the Navy (later released as Sailor Beware), as well as $10 million in total damages.

== Songs ==
- "Beans": lyrics by Mack David, music by Jerry Livingston, sung by Jerry Lewis and cast
- "You and Your Beautiful Eyes": lyrics by Mack David, music by Jerry Livingston, sung by Dean Martin and Polly Bergen
- "Tonda Wanda Hoy": lyrics by Mack David, music by Jerry Livingston, sung by Dean Martin and Jerry Lewis
- "Too Ra Loo Ra Loo Ral": music and lyrics by James Royce Shannon, sung by Dean Martin

== Reception ==
In a contemporary review for The New York Times, critic A. H. Weiler wrote: "The comedy team of Dean Martin and Jerry Lewis, who are starred in this service gambol, work harder than any buck private avoiding a top kick. However, their efforts, except for the masterful mugging of Mr. Lewis, do nothing to put a kick into this consignment of corn."

Reviewer Philip K. Scheuer of the Los Angeles Times wrote:

It takes place, if I may be permitted a slight exaggeration, almost entirely in the offices of an army barracks. These in turn exist in a kind of timeless vacuum through which men in uniform drift rather than advance; a fuzzily photographed vacuum that is neither day nor night, and that puts the same confining strictures upon the audience as it does upon the men. ... Jerry Lewis is the funny member of the duo, in his usual moronic way. It is a little embarrassing to have to laugh at him because our sympathy is with him, so we are relieved whenever he shows flashes of intelligence. He is the sad sack to whom everything happens. Dean Martin plays a sergeant with not much more intelligence and something of a mean streak besides. He acts as if he thinks he is faintly superior not only to Lewis but also to most other people, including the audience. We do not care one way or the other what happens to him, but nothing much does.

== Copyright status ==
This film's copyright was registered to York Pictures Corp. and Screen Associates, Inc. on January 23, 1951 (LP 679), and was renewed on December 7, 1979 (RE43009). However, the film has since lapsed into the public domain as the copyright holders failed to renew their copyright in the 28th year of publication pursuant to the Copyright Act of 1909.

== Home media ==
As the film is in the public domain, many DVD releases have appeared from a variety of companies offering prints of varying quality. In July 2014, Film Chest released a restored version in high definition.

== See also ==
- List of films in the public domain in the United States
