= Joseph J. Lilley =

American composer (1913–1971)

- Born: August 16, 1913; Providence, Rhode Island, U.S.
- Died: January 1, 1971 (aged 57); North Hollywood, California, U.S.
- Occupations: Composer; songwriter; orchestrator
- Spouse: Dorothy Mae Allred (married 1940)

Joseph J. Lilley (August 16, 1913 – January 1, 1971) was an American composer, songwriter and orchestrator. He was Music Director at Paramount Studios from 1941 and was involved in many of the studio's successful musicals in roles varying from vocal arranger to musical director. He worked closely with stars such as Bing Crosby, Martin and Lewis and Elvis Presley. Lilley was nominated at the 32nd Academy Awards for Li'l Abner in Best Musical Score.

== Early life ==
Lilley was born in Providence, Rhode Island, on August 16, 1913. Lilley won a scholarship to attend La Salle Academy (Rhode Island) but he dropped out age 14 following the death of his father. He obtained work at a textile mill in order to support his mother. Lilley also obtained employment as a pianist with a local orchestra and in 1929, at the age of 16, he played piano for an orchestra aboard a Boston-to-New York boat. Still a teenager, Lilley was accepted at both the New England Conservatory of Music, and at Juilliard School of Music where he graduated in 1933.

== Career ==
His first job was as a pianist-arranger for Al Donahue's orchestra and this took him to Bermuda, Nice and Monte Carlo in 1934. While in Monaco, he scored the show "Monte Carlo Follies" put on there by Felix Gerre and also he studied with Joseph Pelletier. Afterwards he continued his studies at the Nice Conservatoire.

Returning to the US, Lilley was hired by NBC as Vocal Coach and Popular Music Supervisor, hiring singers, choirs, arranging and conducting on air programs. In addition, he joined with fellow pianist Jules Monk to form "Jules and Joe", a duo piano act, at Number One Bar at 1 Fifth Avenue, New York. The act was a success. Lilley met many rising stars whom he would later work with, among them, Bob Hope and Dorothy Lamour. Lilley would become her vocal coach. The duo was featured on Cobina Wright's CBS radio show on March 25, 1935.

In 1938, he formed the "Whispering Voice Choir" which broadcast on several radio shows in 1938 and 1939 including "Doctor Rockwell's Brain Trust," (NBC) which starred George Lovejoy Rockwell as Doc Rockwell, and the Crawford Caravan (featuring Jesse Crawford), (NBC). In December 1939, he could also be found playing piano on Lanny Ross' 15-minute morning show on CBS.

In 'Tune Up Time' (CBS radio), Lilley was music director/arranger of a 21-voice choir, known as Kostelanetz Chorus, with Andre Kostelanetz, featuring Tony Martin and Mary Small. Dorothy Lamour was a featured guest on February 26, 1940, as were many other music celebrities of the day. While with Kostelanetz, Lilley wrote vocal arrangements for the Broadway show Hold On to Your Hats starring Al Jolson in 1940. In addition, he did stock arrangements for Paramount and MGM on the side and he received two offers to work for Paramount Pictures in Hollywood, CA. He was music director and vocal arranger for "It Happens on Ice", the first of the musical ice spectacles when the Center Theatre in Rockefeller Center reopened on October 10, 1940.

On October 2, 1940, Lilley signed a contract for the Rudy Vallee Sealtest Show, initially thinking it would be based in New York before realising that it would emanate from Los Angeles. He and Eliot Daniel were the regular songsmiths on Rudy Vallee's radio show in 1941.

Moving to Hollywood in 1940, he made vocal arrangements for Holiday Inn at the start of his almost 30-year association with Paramount, during which he often teamed with Robert E. Dolan.

The Joseph Lilley Singers were regulars on Dinah Shore's radio program too following their debut in September 1943.

== Filmography ==
- 1942: Holiday Inn (vocal arrangements)
- 1942: True to the Army (music: "Jingle Jangle Jingle" - uncredited)
- 1942: The Forest Rangers (music: "Jingle Jangle Jingle")
- 1942: Star Spangled Rhythm (vocal arranger)
- 1943: Dixie (vocal arranger)
- 1944: Rainbow Island (vocal arranger)
- 1944: Hail the Conquering Hero (composer: stock music - uncredited)
- 1947: Variety Girl (musical director)
- 1948: Isn't It Romantic (music)
- 1949: Dear Wife (composer: incidental music)
- 1949: The Great Lover (music)
- 1950: At War with the Army (musical director)
- 1950: Mr. Music (musical director)
- 1951: Here Comes the Groom (music director) / (vocal arranger)
- 1951: The Mating Season (music)
- 1952: Road to Bali (musical director)
- 1952: Sailor Beware (music director)
- 1953: The Stooge (musical director)
- 1953: The Caddy (musical director)
- 1954: White Christmas (music director) / (vocal arranger)
- 1954: Red Garters (musical director) / (vocal adaptor)
- 1955: The Seven Little Foys (conductor)
- 1956: Anything Goes (conductor, music arranger)
- 1956: That Certain Feeling (music)
- 1957: Beau James (conductor, music arranger)
- 1958: Paris Holiday (score)
- 1959: Alias Jesse James (conductor, music arranger)
- 1959: Li'l Abner (music)
- 1960: G.I. Blues (musical director)
- 1961: Blue Hawaii (musical director)
- 1962: Girls! Girls! Girls! (musical director)
- 1963: Papa's Delicate Condition (conductor)
- 1963: Fun in Acapulco (musical director)
- 1963: Who's Minding the Store? (musical director)
- 1964: Roustabout (musical director)
- 1964: The Disorderly Orderly (musical director)
- 1966: Paradise, Hawaiian Style (musical director)
- 1967: Easy Come, Easy Go (musical director)
- 1969: How to Commit Marriage (musical director)
- 1969: Paint Your Wagon (choral arranger, music assistant to producers)
- 1970: On a Clear Day You Can See Forever (choral arranger)

== Recordings ==
Lilley was often in the recording studio, working with Bing Crosby, Judy Garland and Betty Hutton on occasion. His "Whispering Choir" and The Skylarks made an LP for Decca in 1955 called "Alone Together".

== Songwriter ==
Lilley collaborated on a number of songs, the most successful of which was "(I've Got Spurs That) Jingle Jangle Jingle" written with Frank Loesser. This was a huge hit for Kay Kyser in 1942.

== Personal life ==
In 1934, Lilley met Dorothy Mae Allred, a secretary in the music department at NBC. Dorothy, originally from Kansas, was also a pianist. They married on July 20, 1940 at St. Patrick's Cathedral in New York City and they had one daughter, Mary Susan Lilley.

Lilley became ill with cancer, and died on January 1, 1971, at the age of 57 having just returned from Bob Hope’s New Year’s Party.

== Lilley Hall ==
The Lilley family home on Moorpark Street, Toluca Lake was sold in 2013. The men who bought the house, Glenn Geller and Jim Maresca, are longtime members of the West Coast Singers: LGBTQ+ Chorus of Los Angeles, and are great fans of Joe Lilley's music and legacy. They renovated the house and officially named it Lilley Hall in 2017. A commemorative plaque featured at the end of the driveway provides a brief biography and pays tribute to Lilley, Bob Hope and Bing Crosby.

Lilley Hall is one of the preeminent homes in the San Fernando Valley. Tens of thousands visit every year to view its elaborate seasonal holiday displays, listen to free live music, and to participate in the annual Easter Egg Hunt for local children.

The rear yard is also available for parties, weddings and other outdoor events. The home has its own Instagram page.
