= The Caddy (film) =

1953 film by Norman Taurog

- Directed by: Norman Taurog
- Screenplay by: Danny Arnold; Edmund Hartmann; Ken Englund (additional dialogue)
- Story by: Danny Arnold
- Produced by: Paul Jones
- Starring: Dean Martin; Jerry Lewis; Donna Reed; Barbara Bates
- Cinematography: Daniel L. Fapp
- Edited by: Warren Low
- Music by: Joseph J. Lilley
- Production company: York Pictures Corporation
- Distributed by: Paramount Pictures
- Release date: August 10, 1953
- Running time: 95 minutes
- Country: United States
- Language: English
- Budget: $1,864,112
- Box office: $3.5 million (US); 1,008,197 admissions (France)

The Caddy is a 1953 American musical-comedy-sports film starring the comedy team of Martin and Lewis. It is noteworthy for Dean Martin introducing the hit song "That's Amore".

== Plot ==
Harvey Miller, whose father was a famous golf pro, is expected to follow in his footsteps, but Harvey is afraid of crowds. Instead, at the advice of his fiancée Lisa, Harvey becomes a golf instructor. Lisa's brother Joe becomes Harvey's first client and becomes good enough to start playing in tournaments, with Harvey tagging along as his caddie. They encounter Kathy, a wealthy socialite, who is helping to organise one of the tournaments and there is an immediate attraction between her and Joe.

Joe's success goes to his head and he begins to treat Harvey as a hindrance. They begin to quarrel and cause a disruption at a tournament, causing Joe to be disqualified. However, a talent agent witnesses the comical spectacle and advises that they go into show business.

Harvey conquers his fear and they become successful entertainers. At the end, Harvey and Joe meet up with another comedy team who look just like them: the real Martin and Lewis.

== Cast ==
- Dean Martin as Joe Anthony
- Jerry Lewis as Harvey Miller Jr.
- Donna Reed as Kathy Taylor
- Barbara Bates as Lisa Anthony
- Joseph Calleia as Papa Anthony
- Fred Clark as Mr. Baxter aka Old Skinhead
- Clinton Sundberg as Charles, Butler
- Howard Smith as Golf Official
- Marshall Thompson as Bruce Reeber
- Marjorie Gateson as Mrs. Grace Taylor
- Frank Puglia as Mr. Spezzato
- Lewis Martin as Mr. Taylor
- Argentina Brunetti as Mama Anthony
- John Gallaudet as Jonathan Bell
- William Edmunds as Caminello
- Henry Brandon as Mr. Preen
- Tom Harmon as himself (Golf Announcer)
- Nancy Kulp as Emma, Drunk's Wife

This movie is notable for cameo appearances by some of the leading professional golfers of the era (all playing themselves), including Ben Hogan, Sam Snead, Byron Nelson, and Julius Boros.

== Production ==
=== Filming ===
It was filmed from November 24, 1952, through February 23, 1953 and was released by Paramount Pictures on August 10, 1953. It was later re-released in 1964 on a double bill with another Dean Martin and Jerry Lewis picture, You're Never Too Young (1955).

This was the team's first film since At War with the Army (1950) to be produced by their own production company, York Pictures Corporation. During shooting, on January 8, 1953, production was suspended for 23 days when Lewis entered Cedars of Lebanon Hospital with a fever. The movie became Martin and Lewis' most expensive to date.

=== Music ===
The score for the film includes the hit "That's Amore", sung by Dean Martin. It was nominated for an Oscar for Best Original Song, but lost to "Secret Love" from Calamity Jane.

=== Promotion ===
The team made a promotional radio message for the movie. Several outtakes, available on The Golden Age of Comedy: Dean Martin and Jerry Lewis CD, feature Dean and Jerry trying to get through five lines of dialogue. When either one of them messed up a line, they exchanged several lines of profanity.

== Reception ==
On Rotten Tomatoes, the film holds an 83% rating from six reviews, with an average score of 5.8/10.

== Home media ==
The film was included on an eight-film DVD set, the Dean Martin and Jerry Lewis Collection: Volume One, released on October 31, 2006.

== Impact ==
The career of Donna Reed began a huge upswing following the release of The Caddy. Five days prior to the film's release, Columbia Pictures released From Here to Eternity, which won Reed an Academy Award for Best Supporting Actress.
