= Eddie Mayehoff =

American jazz musician (1909–1992)

- Mayehoff (right) and Cyril Ritchard in the play Visit to a Small Planet (1957)
- Born: Edward Mier Mayehoff; July 7, 1909; Baltimore, Maryland, U.S.
- Died: November 12, 1992 (aged 83); Ventura, California, U.S.
- Education: Yale School of Music
- Occupations: Jazz Musician and Actor
- Years active: 1946-1970

Edward Mier Mayehoff (July 7, 1909 – November 12, 1992) was an American actor, perhaps best known for his role as Harold Lampson, the henpecked husband and incompetent lawyer in How to Murder Your Wife (1965). Mayehoff could also be seen in TV commercials during the 1950s (e.g., for Falstaff beer).

== Early years ==
Mayehoff grew up in Norwalk, Connecticut, after having been born in Baltimore, Maryland. He graduated from Yale University's School of Music, where he played four instruments, led the school's orchestra, and sang in the glee club.

== Career ==
Mayehoff began his career as a musician, playing trombone and leading a dance band in New York hotels. For five years, he played around the United States in hotels in the Knott and United Hotels chains. He left music behind and turned to impersonations of celebrities, performing in night clubs.

During World War II, he enlisted in the Coast Guard, but seasickness caused him to leave. After that, he entertained military personnel for the USO and worked with the Army's radio division. He also recorded programs for the BBC.

On radio, by 1940 he had a weekly show on the Mutual Radio Network called On the Town. He also was a regular on The Charlie McCarthy Show and was host of Beat the Band.

On television, from 1946 to 1947, he co-hosted Hour Glass, the first regularly scheduled U.S. network variety show. In 1952, he starred in the NBC sitcom Doc Corkle, which was broadcast for only three weeks. In the 1954-55 television season, Mayehoff appeared as a construction contractor and former football player trying to impel his son to success on the American football gridiron in That's My Boy, based on the 1951 Dean Martin and Jerry Lewis film of the same name, in which Mayehoff played the same part. Mayehoff also appeared in two other Martin and Lewis comedy films, The Stooge (1952) and Artists and Models (1955).

Without offering explanation, the Broadway historian Ethan Mordden described Mayehoff as "the most disliked comedian who ever lived who wasn't El Brendel." (Page 194, "The Guest List," St. Martin's Press, 2010.)

Mayehoff's Broadway credits included A Rainy Day in Newark (1963), A Thurber Carnival (1960), A Visit to a Small Planet (1957), Season in the Sun (1950), Concert Varieties (1945), and Rhapsody (1944).

== Death ==
Mayehoff died in Ventura, California at the age of 83.

== Filmography ==
Year	Title	Role	Notes
1951	That's My Boy	Jarring Jack Jackson	
1951	The Stooge	Leo Lyman	
1953	Off Limits	Karl Danzig	released in Britain as Military Policemen
1955	Artists and Models	Mr. Murdock	
1965	How to Murder Your Wife	Harold Lampson	
1967	Luv	D.A. Goodhart	
