= Road to Bali =

1952 film by Hal Walker

- Theatrical release poster
- Directed by: Hal Walker
- Screenplay by: Frank Butler; Hal Kanter; William Morrow
- Story by: Frank Butler; Harry Tugend
- Produced by: Daniel Dare; Harry Tugend
- Starring: Bing Crosby; Bob Hope; Dorothy Lamour
- Cinematography: George Barnes
- Edited by: Archie Marshek
- Music by: Joseph J. Lilley
- Color process: Technicolor
- Production companies: Bing Crosby Productions; Hope Enterprises
- Distributed by: Paramount Pictures
- Release date: November 19, 1952
- Running time: 91 minutes
- Country: United States
- Language: English
- Box office: $3 million (USA/Canada rentals); 43,450 admissions (France)

Road To Bali

Road to Bali is a 1952 American comedy film directed by Hal Walker and starring Bing Crosby, Bob Hope, and Dorothy Lamour. Released by Paramount Pictures on November 19, 1952, the film is the sixth of the seven Road to ... movies. It was the only entry in the series filmed in Technicolor and was the first to feature surprise cameo appearances from other well-known stars of the day.

== Plot ==
George and Harold, American song-and-dance men performing in Melbourne, Australia, leave in a hurry to avoid various marriage proposals. They end up in Darwin, where they take jobs as deep sea divers for a prince. They are taken by boat to an idyllic island on the way to Bali, Indonesia. They vie for the favors of exotic (and half-Scottish) Princess Lala, a cousin of the Prince. A hazardous dive produces a chest of priceless jewels, which the Prince plans to claim as his own.

After escaping from the Prince and his henchmen, the three are shipwrecked and washed up on another island. Lala is now in love with both of the boys and can't decide which to choose. However, once the natives find them, she learns that in their society, a woman may take multiple husbands, and declares she will marry them both. While the boys are prepared for the ceremony, both thinking the other man lost, plans are changed. She's being unwillingly wed to the already much-married King, while the boys end up married to each other.

Displeased with the arrangement, a volcano god initiates a massive eruption. After fleeing, the three end up on yet another beach where Lala chooses George over Harold. An undaunted Harold conjures up Jane Russell from a basket by playing a flute. Alas, she, too, rejects Harold, which means George walks off with both Lala and Jane. A lonesome Harold is left on the beach, demanding that the film shouldn't finish and trying unsuccessfully to keep the words "The End" from appearing on the screen.

== Cast ==
- Bing Crosby as George Cochran
- Bob Hope as Harold Gridley
- Dorothy Lamour as Princess Lala McTavish
- Murvyn Vye as Prince Ken Arok
- Peter Coe as Gung
- Ralph Moody as Bhoma Da
- Leon Askin as King Ramayana
- Carolyn Jones as Eunice
- Michael Ansara as Guard
- Harry Cording as Verna's father
- Steve Calvert as Gorilla
- Devi Dja as Dancer (uncredited)

=== Cameo appearances ===
Among the celebrities who appear in unexpected fourth wall-breaking gag cameos are; bandleader Bob Crosby (Bing's brother), Humphrey Bogart, by way of a clip from The African Queen, Jerry Lewis, Dean Martin, and Jane Russell, as her character from the film Son of Paleface (1952). The cameo by Martin and Lewis was part of a 'comedy trade' whereby they made an appearance in this movie while Hope and Crosby appeared in Martin and Lewis's Scared Stiff the following year. Martin and Lewis also made films for Paramount at the time.

== Production ==
=== Development ===
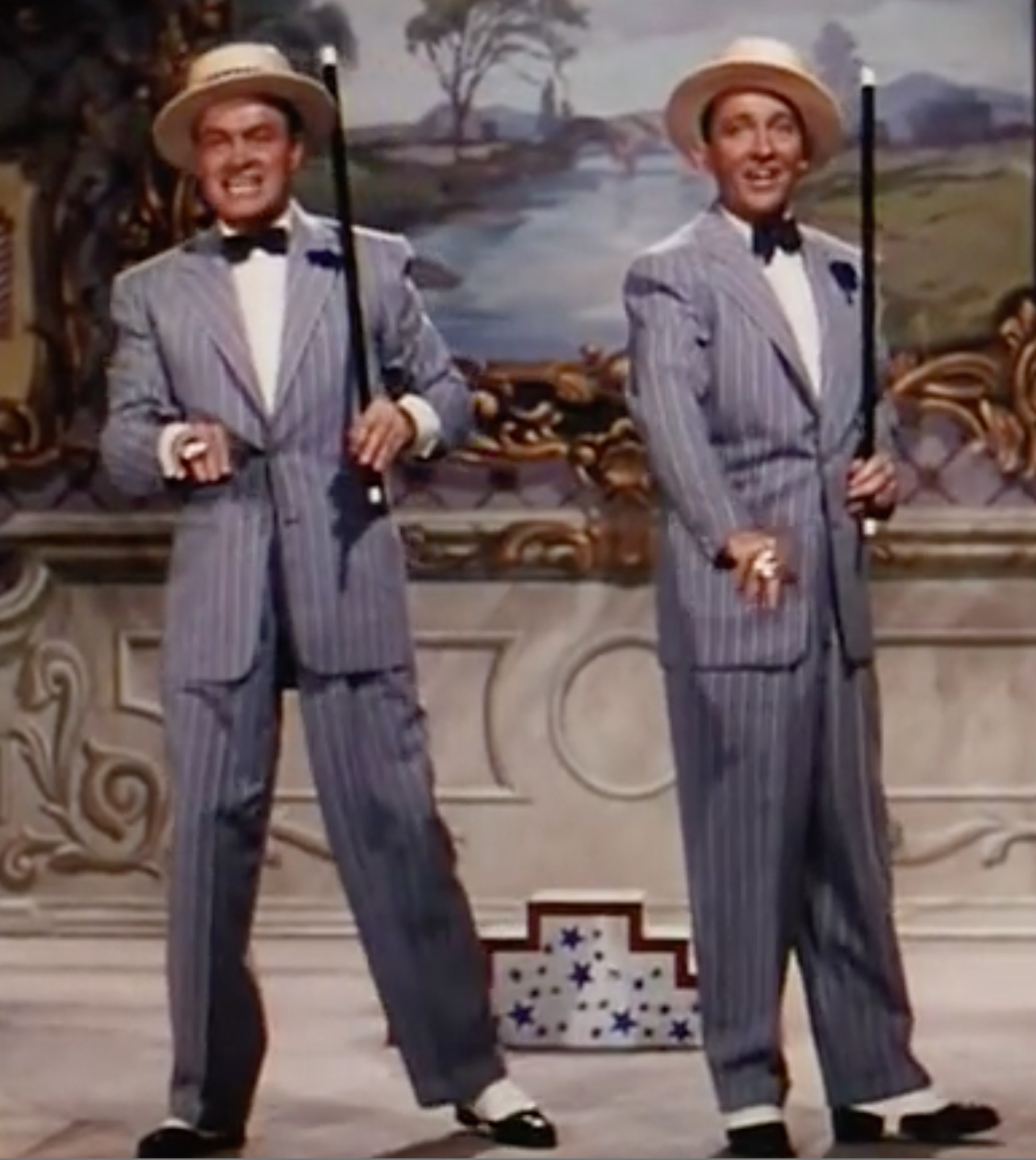
Hope and Crosby in opening song-and-dance performance

Road to Bali was the first Road to... picture since Road to Rio (1947), and was known during production as The Road to Hollywood. It was the sixth film in the series, the next to last, as well as the final Road film in which Dorothy Lamour's role would be the female lead. (Nine years later, The Road to Hong Kong instead featured Joan Collins, with a cameo by Lamour.) Filming started on April 21, 1952, and continued until July of the same year.

Road to Bali was a co-production of Bing Crosby Enterprises, Hope Enterprises and Paramount.

=== Filming ===
The giant squid that threatens Bob Hope in an underwater scene was previously seen attacking Ray Milland in the Paramount production Reap the Wild Wind (1942), directed by Cecil B. DeMille. The erupting volcano climax was taken directly from the Paramount production Aloma of the South Seas (1941), also starring Lamour.

=== Writing ===
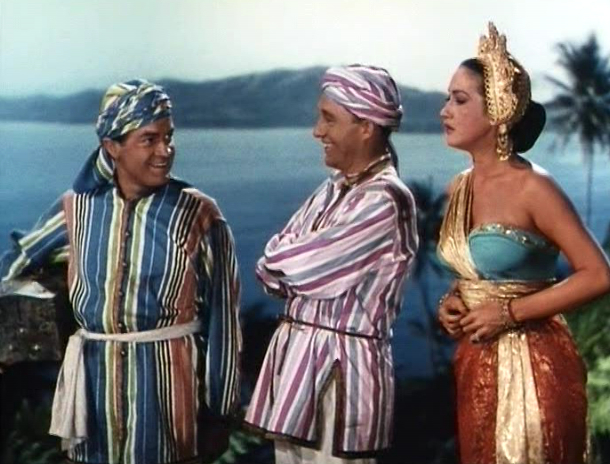
Hope, Crosby, and Lamour

In keeping with the film's initial setting of Melbourne, Australia, many of the jokes contain references to Argyle socks, Australian opera singer Dame Nellie Melba, Tasmanian-born Errol Flynn, and a dance routine featuring Scottish bagpipes.

As with the other Road movies, Bob Hope breaks the "fourth wall" several times to make side comments to the audience. For example, as the music for a song sung by Bing Crosby begins, Hope looks to the camera and says, "He's gonna sing, folks. Now's the time to go out and get the popcorn."

Crosby breaks the fourth wall after Hope "notices" the audience is paying attention when he's about to tell Crosby how he escaped from the giant squid. Hope and Crosby walk away from the camera and Hope tells his story in exaggerated pantomime (out of earshot). Crosby then walks back toward the audience and shrugs at the camera.

=== Sets ===
Hope Enterprises owned one-third of the film and Bob Hope wrote about this in his book This Is on Me.

"There are other pleasant things about owning part of a picture. In the Road to Bali there was a beach scene for which tons of beautiful white sand had been trucked in from Pebble Beach. I had just put in a one-hole golf course at my house on Moorpark Street in North Hollywood. I had four sand traps standing empty, with nothing in them in which my friends could leave their hoof prints. When I saw that sand a light switched on in my head.

“We own two-thirds of this sand, don’t we?” I asked. “Sure,” Bing said. “Why?” “Well,” I replied, “I’d like some of it for my course at home.” When he said, “Why not?” I called the prop man and said, “Take ten truck-loads of this sand out to my house when we’re done with it.” “No dice,” he said. “This is Paramount’s sand.”

Bing and I had another talk with the boys in the front office. As a result, part of the Road to Bali is in my back yard.

== Reception ==
Paramount hired the Bijou Theatre in New York City on November 14, 1952, to preview the film to exhibitors and critics. Hope was not happy that Paramount only spent $150,000 promoting the film compared to the $300-$400,000 he expected. The film opened in the United States on December 25, 1952, and opened in fourth position at the box-office. The New York premiere of the film took place at the Astor Theatre on January 29, 1953.

Bosley Crowther of The New York Times was very enthusiastic in his review of January 30, 1953:

"it is apparent that this veteran and camera-scarred team is the neatest, smoothest combo of comics now working the fun side of the screen. Apart, they may be very funny or clever or quaint or what you will, according to where you are sitting and what sort of picture they’re in. But together, and in a 'Road' picture, with the consequent freedom of style and reckless impulse that goes with it, they are pretty nigh nonpareil. At least, that's the word of this reviewer who spent a small part of yesterday falling out of a seat at the Astor while desperately clutching his sides. The reason? Quite simply, Road to Bali is a whoopingly hilarious film, full of pure crazy situations and deliciously discourteous gags, all played with evident relish and split-second timing by the team."

William Brogdon of Variety was more cautious, having seen a preview, and their comments may have resulted in the removal of a couple of scenes:

"Bing Crosby, Bob Hope and Dorothy Lamour are back again in another of Paramount’s highway sagas, this time in Technicolor, with nonsensical amusement its only destination. That end is reached eventually, but the road isn’t a smooth highway and the entertainment occasionally falters. Overall, however, it serves its intended purpose satisfactorily and the grossing prospects are okay...Hal Walker’s direction is geared to the free-wheeling spirit that dominates the script and does well by it, as do the three stars and the featured cast."

An extended choreographed version of "The Road to Bali" song which was cut from the final print has surfaced in recent years, and Paramount chief Adolph Zukor revealed in his autobiography that an expensive water ballet sequence was cut from the film too.

== Soundtrack ==
The music for all songs was written by Jimmy Van Heusen and Johnny Burke. Van Heusen's birth name was Edward Chester Babcock. For the final Road picture, The Road to Hong Kong, Hope's character was called Chester Babcock.

When Decca Records was recording the songs from the movie, they did not use Dorothy Lamour. Peggy Lee recorded the Lamour vocals.

- "Chicago Style" by Bing Crosby and Bob Hope
- "Moonflowers" by Dorothy Lamour
- "Hoots Mon" by Bing Crosby and Bob Hope
- "To See You Is to Love You" by Bing Crosby
- "The Merry-Go-Run-Around" by Bob Hope, Dorothy Lamour and Bing Crosby
- "The Road To Bali" by Bing Crosby and Bob Hope (recorded commercially, but only used in the opening credits as sung by a chorus).

Bing Crosby, Bob Hope and Peggy Lee recorded all of the songs for Decca Records and these were issued on a 10" LP. Crosby's songs were also included in the Bing's Hollywood series.

== Legacy ==
Road to Bali was parodied in 1953 in the animated short Alley to Bali, with Woody Woodpecker and Buzz Buzzard in the Hope and Crosby roles. The cartoon was released by Universal Studios, which currently owns the first four Road to... films.

=== Copyright status ===
The film was copyrighted under registration LP2200 1 January 1953. That registration entry also shows "in notice: 1952", meaning that is the year in the copyright notice on the film. The copyright was renewed under RE105899 dated 1 September 1981. However, according to copyright law, when the "in notice" year is earlier than the calendar year of the official registration, the copyright term begins in the earlier year (1952 in this case). Therefore, for films registered for copyright in 1950 and later, the window for a valid renewal was the 28th calendar year of the original copyright term. For Road to Bali, the 28th year was 1980, which means the film had already fallen into the public domain when the copyright was renewed in 1981.

== Home media ==
Columbia Pictures Television (in joint venture with LBS Communications through what was then Colex Enterprises) once had the television rights to this film in the 1980s, along with other Bob Hope movies from the 1940s and 1950s. This is evident in a home video release from the mid-1990s, where a CPT logo can be seen at the beginning and end of the film.

Because the film is in the public domain, there have been at least a dozen DVD releases from a variety of companies over the years. However, Fremantle now holds ancillary rights to this film (as the successor in interest to LBS Communications), and official video releases have been issued under license from Fremantle, with DVD and HD-DVD releases coming from BCI Eclipse. A DVD and Blu-Ray were released on July 5, 2017, by Kino International.
