= The Stooge =

1952 film by Norman Taurog

- Directed by: Norman Taurog
- Written by: Fred Finklehoffe; Martin Rackin
- Produced by: Hal B. Wallis
- Starring: Dean Martin; Jerry Lewis; Polly Bergen; Marion Marshall; Eddie Mayehoff
- Cinematography: Daniel L. Fapp
- Edited by: Warren Low
- Music by: Joseph J. Lilley
- Distributed by: Paramount Pictures
- Release dates: December 31, 1952 (limited); February 4, 1953 (New York and Los Angeles)
- Running time: 100 minutes
- Country: United States
- Language: English
- Box office: $3.5 million (US); 37,424 admissions (France)

The Stooge is a 1952 American comedy film directed by Norman Taurog and starring the comedy team of Martin and Lewis alongside Polly Bergen and Marion Marshall. The film was released nationally in the United States in February 1953 by Paramount Pictures.

== Plot ==
In 1930, entertainer Bill Miller believes that he has the ability to become a solo performer. He and his partner Ben Bailey split up and go their separate ways. Miller fails miserably, and his manager Leo Lyman thinks it would be a good idea to perform with a "stooge." Enter Ted Rogers, who plays an accident-prone foil for Miller. Soon afterwards, Miller's act is a hit.

Along the way, Rogers is unaware that he is the real reason the act is a success and becomes very loyal to Miller. Even though he receives no billing, he defends his "partner" when others suggest he is being taken advantage of by Miller.

Eventually, even Miller's wife Mary Turner is ashamed of his treatment of Rogers, going so far as to threaten him with divorce. Miller is more determined than ever to prove he can make it as a single and fires Rogers, but promptly regrets his decision as his first performance as a true solo artist flops. He addresses the audience, apologizing and admitting that the "stooge" was the true heart and soul of the act. Rogers, who is sitting in the audience, comes to his rescue by joining him onstage and the two finally become true partners.

== Cast ==
- Dean Martin as Bill Miller
- Jerry Lewis as Theodore 'Ted' Rogers
- Polly Bergen as Mary Turner
- Marion Marshall as Genevieve 'Frecklehead' Tait
- Eddie Mayehoff as Leo Lyman
- Richard Erdman as Ben Bailey
- Frances Bavier as Mrs. Rogers

== Production ==
The Stooge was filmed between February 19 and March 24, 1951, and although it was filmed before two other Martin and Lewis films, Sailor Beware and Jumping Jacks, this film was withheld from distribution by Paramount because they were concerned about the audience's reaction to the way Martin treated Lewis in the movie. Lewis has stated that this is his favorite Martin and Lewis film.

== Home media ==
The Stooge has been released four times on DVD. It was originally released on October 12, 2004. Two years later it was included on an eight-film DVD set, the Dean Martin and Jerry Lewis Collection: Volume One, released on October 31, 2006. In June 2018, it was released as part of a 10 film collection of Jerry Lewis films on DVD, and again on March 15, 2021.

On November 10, 2020, it was released on Blu-ray by Paramount.

== In other media ==
=== Comic books ===
- Eastern Color Movie Love #13 (February 1952)
