= Road to Utopia =

1946 American semi-musical comedy film directed by Hal Walker

- Theatrical release poster
- Directed by: Hal Walker
- Screenplay by: Melvin Frank; Norman Panama
- Produced by: Paul Jones
- Starring: Bing Crosby; Bob Hope; Dorothy Lamour
- Narrated by: Robert Benchley
- Cinematography: Lionel Lindon
- Edited by: Stuart Gilmore
- Music by: Leigh Harline
- Production company: Paramount Pictures
- Distributed by: Paramount Pictures
- Release date: February 27, 1946
- Running time: 90 minutes
- Country: United States
- Language: English
- Box office: $5 million (US rentals)

Road to Utopia is a 1946 American musical comedy film directed by Hal Walker and starring Bing Crosby, Bob Hope, and Dorothy Lamour. Filmed in 1943 but not released until 1946, Road to Utopia is the fourth film of the "Road to ..." series. Written by Melvin Frank and Norman Panama, the film is about two vaudeville performers at the turn of the twentieth century who go to Alaska to make their fortune. Along the way they find a map to a secret gold mine. In 1947, Road to Utopia received an Academy Award nomination for Best Original Screenplay.

== Plot ==
Academy Award-winner Robert Benchley introduces the film, explaining that “the front office” has charged him with explaining the plot “and other vague portions of the film.”

Sal and Chester Hooton, an old married couple, are visited by their equally old friend Duke Johnson, and the three reminisce about their previous adventure in the Klondike.

The film flashes back to the turn of the century. Hooton and Johnson are doing a variety act as "Prof Zambini and Ghost-O". Their trick cons people out of money and they run when the hall is raided by the police. They escape and Johnson wants to head for Alaska. Hooton wants to go to New York. They part at the embarkation quay, but Johnson cheats Hooton out of money and when he runs back to challenge him he gets stuck on the ship going to Alaska. They have to work for their passage. While doing housekeeping duties in a cabin, Chester finds a map to a gold mine. McGurk and Sperry enter behind them, but Duke and Chester overpower the thugs and take their place (and their beards) to get off the boat.

Meanwhile, in Alaska, Sal van Hoyden goes to see the owner of the Last Chance dance hall, Ace Larson. She has a story of a map of a gold mine stolen by two men: McGurk and Sperry. Instead of going to the police, Larson assures Sal that he will take care of things. He gives her a job performing in his saloon, an act which infuriates Larson's girlfriend, Kate. Larson tells Kate how he really plans to take Sal's gold mine for the two of them and passionately kisses her.

Arriving in Alaska, Chester and Duke find that the entire town is terrified of their personas. They see Sal's singing routine and are both instantly smitten. Sal plays up to both of them in turn: first Chester, then Duke. She invites each to her room at midnight. She doubts they are the real killers, but Ace's lackey, Lebec, reminds her to get the map at all costs.

Chester and Duke argue over who gets to hold the map and decide to tear it in half and each man keep his for safekeeping.

Duke and Chester manage to escape by dog sled; initially pulling the sled themselves with the large dog they found acting as passenger. En route, they meet Santa Claus on his sled going in the opposite direction. They find Kate in the snow, who is lying there as part of a ruse, and Sal runs into them while riding her own dog sled. Kate has access to a cabin nearby, and all four stay together there. She chats up first Chester, then Duke, to establish where the map is. Duke confesses he is not McGurk.

Sal, now realizing how much she loves Duke, refuses to go along with the plan. But Kate warns her that only Ace can keep them from being killed and the only way to get to him is to give up the map. Sal reluctantly agrees to steal the map while the men sleep, and does so. The two girls leave the next morning with Lebec.

Duke and Chester are confronted by the real McGurk and Sperry and they realize the girls had stolen the map. They still manage to escape and, after a merry chase through the mountains, head back to town. They readopt their McGurk and Sperry personas but are distressed to find the latter are likely to be hanged. They scare off the posse with a stick of dynamite and rescue Sal who is tied in a back room. They leave the lit dynamite in a candlestick just as the real McGurk and Sperry arrive, and they get blown up while the three escape. They escape by dog sled, but the sled overturns.

The ice splits with Duke and Chester each having one leg on each side as the gap widens. Eventually, this leaves Sal and Chester on opposite sides, with Duke on the side of the mob. He throws the map, wishes them well, and turns to face the mob.

The movie flashes forward into the film's present, with aged Duke telling Sal and Chester how he escaped the mob. He is then surprised to hear that Chester and Sal have a son. They call for him, and he bears a striking resemblance to Duke. Chester looks into the camera and says, "We adopted him."

== Cast ==
- Bing Crosby as Duke Johnson/Junior Hooton
- Bob Hope as Chester Hooton
- Dorothy Lamour as Sal Van Hoyden
- Hillary Brooke as Kate
- Douglass Dumbrille as Ace Larson
- Jack La Rue as LeBec (as Jack LaRue)
- Robert Barrat as Sperry
- Nestor Paiva as McGurk
- Robert Benchley as Narrator
- Chester Conklin as Banjo Player (uncredited)
- Al Ferguson as Policeman (uncredited)
- Paul Newlan as Tough Ship's Purser (uncredited)
- Snub Pollard as participant in talent show (uncredited)
- Bobby Barber as bartender (uncredited)
- Ferdinand Munier as Santa Claus (uncredited)
- Charles Gamorra as The Talking Bear---Bear voiced by Billy Bletcher.

== Production ==
Filmed from December 1943 to March 1944, the film is the only Road to … film without a real place in its title, though Alaska with its gold mines is referred to as "Utopia" several times in the film. Bob Hope, Bing Crosby and Dorothy Lamour starred, as they did in all but one of the series. The film is also the only "Road" film that did not take place in modern times though the film begins and ends with the cast made up to look older to frame the flashback.

As a “narrator”, humor essayist Robert Benchley provides some wry commentary that is interspersed throughout the movie (Benchley died several months before the film's release). There are also jabs at Paramount Pictures (the studio that originally released the film) and a reference to Frank Sinatra, not to mention many instances of "breaking the fourth wall" and general wackiness. During Crosby's fake incantation at the beginning of the film include the phrase "presto-sturgando", which is a reference to Paramount writer-director Preston Sturges.

In her autobiography, Dorothy Lamour said that Paramount may have delayed the release of Road to Utopia for fear of jeopardizing the public's—and the Academy Awards committee's—acceptance of Crosby in the role of a priest in Going My Way. Crosby did win the 1944 Best Actor Oscar for his portrayal of Father “Chuck” O'Malley

== Reception ==
The film was 10th in the list of top-grossing movies of 1946.

It was the biggest hit at the British box office in 1946 after The Wicked Lady, The Bells of St Marys, Piccadilly Incident and The Captive Heart.

The film was well received critically. Bosley Crowther of The New York Times wrote: "Not since Charlie Chaplin was prospecting for gold in a Hollywood-made Alaska many long years ago has so much howling humor been swirled with so much artificial snow as it is in “Road to Utopia,” which came to the Paramount yesterday." Variety wrote: "The highly successful Crosby-Hope-Lamour “Road” series under the Paramount banner comes to attention once again in “Road to Utopia,” a zany laugh-getter which digresses somewhat from pattern by gently kidding the picture business and throwing in unique little touches, all with a view to tickling the risibilities. Very big boxoffice [sic] results assured..."

== Soundtrack ==
All songs were written by Johnny Burke (lyrics) and Jimmy Van Heusen (music).

- "Goodtime Charlie" by Bing Crosby and Bob Hope (sung in their vaudeville act in US)
- "It's Anybody's Spring" by Bing Crosby and Bob Hope (sung on the ship)
- "Personality" by Dorothy Lamour (in the Alaska dance hall)
- "Welcome to My Dreams" by Bing Crosby (to Sal in Sal's room)
- "Put It There, Pal" by Bing Crosby and Bob Hope (on the dog sled)
- "Would You?" by Dorothy Lamour (sung to Chester in the snowy wilderness)

Bing Crosby recorded four of the songs for Decca Records. “Personality” (which was not sung by Crosby in the film) charted briefly in the Billboard charts reaching the No. 9 spot. Crosby's songs were also included in the Bing's Hollywood series.

Johnny Mercer and The Pied Pipers had a No. 1 hit with "Personality" and Dinah Shore's version also charted.
