= Hal Walker =

American film director

- Born: March 20, 1896; Ottumwa, Iowa, U.S.
- Died: July 3, 1972 (aged 76); Tracy, California, U.S.
- Occupations: Assistant director and director
- Years active: 1935-1953

Hal Walker (March 20, 1896 – July 3, 1972) was an American film director. He was known for doing some of the earliest Dean Martin and Jerry Lewis films such as At War with the Army and Sailor Beware and some with the team of Bing Crosby and Bob Hope, directing Road to Utopia and Road to Bali.

== Early years ==
Walker was born in Ottumwa, Iowa, and was a private in the Marine Corps during World War I. After he was discharged, he drove a taxi in Chicago for two years. He also was a traveling salesman for a company that made dress patterns.

== Career ==
After beginning in the film industry as an extra and a player of bit parts, Walker worked for years as an assistant director in films, learning the business "from the ground up". His big break came when Crosby, Hope, and Dorothy Lamour urged executives at Paramount Pictures to give him an opportunity to be a director.

Walker was nominated at the 10th Academy Awards in the category of Best Assistant Director for the film Souls at Sea.

== Selected filmography ==
- Souls at Sea (1937)
- Road to Zanzibar (1941)
- Road to Morocco (1942)
- The Stork Club (1945)
- Road to Utopia (1945)
- Out of This World (1945)
- My Friend Irma Goes West (1950)
- At War with the Army (1950)
- That's My Boy (1951)
- Sailor Beware (1952)
- Road to Bali (1952)
