= That's My Boy (1951 film) =

1951 film by Hal Walker

- Directed by: Hal Walker
- Written by: Cy Howard
- Produced by: Cy Howard; Hal B. Wallis
- Starring: Dean Martin; Jerry Lewis; Ruth Hussey; Eddie Mayehoff; Polly Bergen
- Cinematography: Lee Garmes
- Edited by: Warren Low
- Music by: Leigh Harline
- Distributed by: Paramount Pictures
- Release date: July 20, 1951 (Atlantic City, New Jersey)
- Running time: 98 minutes
- Language: English
- Box office: $3.8 million (U.S. rentals); 21,386 admissions (France)

That's My Boy is a 1951 American musical comedy film directed by Hal Walker and starring the comedy team of Martin and Lewis.

== Plot ==
Junior Jackson is the weakling son of former All-America football hero Jarring Jack Jackson. His mother is a former champion Olympic swimmer. Junior is a disappointment to his father, who cannot understand how two athletes could produce such an unathletic son. Junior is more interested in animal husbandry than in sports. In exchange for free tuition to college, Bill Baker makes a deal with Jarring Jack to turn his son into a football star.

Junior is somehow selected for the team but scores a touchdown for the opposite team. He falls in love with beautiful coed Terry Howard, but he is too shy to talk to her and she and Bill begin a romance. To maintain the ruse (and free education), Bill and Terry continue to support Junior and build his newfound confidence. Junior confides to Bill that he intends to marry Terry, so Bill, feeling guilty, becomes drunk and creates a scene at Terry's dorm that results in his expulsion. Junior learns the truth about Bill and Terry and is determined to make things right.

Junior wins the big game single-handedly and finally fulfills his father's expectations.

== Cast ==
- Dean Martin as Bill Baker
- Jerry Lewis as "Junior" Jackson
- Ruth Hussey as Ann Jackson
- Eddie Mayehoff as Jarring Jack Jackson
- Marion Marshall as Terry Howard
- Polly Bergen as Betty "Babs" Hunter
- Hugh Sanders as Coach Wheeler
- John McIntire as Dr. Benjamin Green
- Francis Pierlot as Henry Baker
- Lillian Randolph as May
- Selmer Jackson as "Doc" Hunter (billed as Selmar Jackson)
- Tom Harmon as Himself (announcer)
- Gregg Palmer as Student (billed as Palmer Lee)
- Hazel Boyne as Housemother (billed as Hazel "Sonny" Boyne)
- Frank Gifford as "Junior" Jackson (football sequences)
- Don Haggerty as Tom

== Production ==
That's My Boy was filmed from December 6, 1950 through January 10, 1951. Location shooting occurred at Occidental College in northeast Los Angeles.

== Songs ==
- "Ballin' the Jack", sung by Dean Martin, Polly Bergen and ensemble
- "I'm in the Mood for Love", sung by Dean Martin

== Release ==
The film's world premiere was held on July 20, 1951 at the Warner Theatre in Atlantic City, New Jersey, the city in which Martin and Lewis first appeared on stage together in 1946.

== Reception ==
In a contemporary review for The New York Times, critic A. H. Weiler wrote: "There are occasional moments when the mixture, spiked by the mugging of Jerry Lewis, does have its special lift. By and large, however, this latest excursion into amiable insanity by the team of Dean Martin and Jerry Lewis is a labored repetition of one situation. Will the undernourished, sickly, anxiety-ridden Jerry meet the expectations of his football hero dad? Perhaps this isn't the weather for such athletic goings-on. At any rate, it doesn't seem to make much difference once the joke is told."

== Legacy ==
A CBS television series based on the film aired for one season from 1954 to 1955, with Eddie Mayehoff reprising his role as Jarring Jack Jackson. Gil Stratton played "Junior" Jackson and Rochelle Hudson was cast as Alice Jackson. The series was rerun by CBS during the summer of 1959.

== Home video ==
The film was included in the Dean Martin and Jerry Lewis Collection: Volume One eight-film DVD set that was released on October 31, 2006.

== See also ==
- List of American football films
