= My Friend Irma Goes West =

1950 film by Hal Walker

- Directed by: Hal Walker
- Screenplay by: Cy Howard; Parke Levy
- Produced by: Hal B. Wallis
- Starring: John Lund; Marie Wilson; Diana Lynn; Dean Martin; Jerry Lewis
- Cinematography: Lee Garmes
- Edited by: Warren Low
- Music by: Leigh Harline
- Distributed by: Paramount Pictures
- Release date: May 31, 1950
- Running time: 90 minutes
- Country: United States
- Language: English
- Box office: $2.4 million (US rentals); 10,530 admissions (France)

My Friend Irma Goes West is a 1950 American comedy film directed by Hal Walker and based on the radio show My Friend Irma. It stars the comedy team of Dean Martin and Jerry Lewis. The film is a sequel to My Friend Irma (1949) and was released on May 31, 1950 by Paramount Pictures.

== Plot ==
Con artist Al is trying to promote Steve Laird's career. Steve is booked by a local television station and is spotted by a film producer. He is offered a contract and heads to Hollywood along with friends Irma, Jane and Seymour.

The trip ends suddenly when the producer is discovered to be an escaped lunatic. Al tries to set things straight by taking the gang to Las Vegas to work at a casino, where Irma causes havoc by wrecking a rigged roulette wheel. She is kidnapped and held for ransom until Al can raise $50,000.

Seymour, dressed as an Indian brave, locates Irma and rescues her. The publicity received during the entire incident brings a motion-picture offer for Irma and Seymour.

== Cast ==
- John Lund as Al
- Marie Wilson as Irma Peterson
- Diana Lynn as Jane Stacy
- Dean Martin as Steve Laird
- Jerry Lewis as Seymour
- Corinne Calvet as Yvonne Yvonne
- Lloyd Corrigan as Sharpie Corrigan
- Gregg Palmer as Ambulance attendant
- Don Porter as Mr. Brent

== Production ==
My Friend Irma Goes West was filmed from January 31 through March 18, 1950. It was the second Martin and Lewis film to be released, preceding At War with the Army, which had been produced before My Friend Irma Goes West but was not released until December 1950.

== Reception ==
In a contemporary review for The New York Times, critic Thomas M. Pryor wrote: "Jerry Lewis, the slight, abject, elastic young man, and his straight-man-accomplice with the velvety baritone singing voice, Dean Martin, are responsible for about ninety-nine and nine-tenths of the fun ... There is a marked reduction in the quality of the show when Martin and Lewis are off the screen and sometimes even they are victimized by the silly script. However, M. & L. are in there pitching most of the time and most of the time they are in top form. ... Without them, the film would not add up to anything. The story is a nondescript affair ... it's the interpretation that stirs up the fun in 'My Friend Irma Goes West.'"

== Home media ==
My Friend Irma Goes West has been released twice on DVD. It was originally released as part of a two-film collection with My Friend Irma on October 25, 2005. It was also included in an eight-film DVD set, the Dean Martin and Jerry Lewis Collection: Volume One, released on October 31, 2006.
