= My Friend Irma (film) =

1949 film by George Marshall

- Theatrical release poster
- Directed by: George Marshall
- Screenplay by: Cy Howard; Parke Levy
- Produced by: Hal B. Wallis
- Starring: John Lund; Marie Wilson; Diana Lynn; Don DeFore; Dean Martin; Jerry Lewis; Hans Conried
- Cinematography: Leo Tover
- Edited by: Leroy Stone
- Music by: Roy Webb
- Distributed by: Paramount Pictures
- Release date: September 28, 1949 (New York)
- Running time: 102 minutes
- Language: English
- Box office: $2.8 million (US and Canadian rentals); 10,247 admissions (France)

My Friend Irma is a 1949 American comedy film starring John Lund, Diana Lynn, Don DeFore and Marie Wilson. Directed by George Marshall, it marks the film debut of the comedy team of Dean Martin and Jerry Lewis. The film is based upon the CBS radio series My Friend Irma that first aired in 1947. Released by Paramount Pictures, the film premiered in New York on September 28, 1949.

== Plot ==
Friends Irma Peterson and Jane Stacey room together in New York. Irma is a somewhat dimwitted blonde with good intentions. Jane is an ambitious woman who dreams of marrying a rich man. She becomes a secretary for millionaire Richard Rhinelander. Irma is in love with Al, a con artist looking to become rich quickly. After Al visits an orange-juice stand and encounters Steve Laird singing, he convinces Steve to leave his job and promises to make him famous. Al invites Steve and his partner Seymour to live at Irma and Jane's apartment. Jane is angry, but Irma convinces her to let them stay. Jane and Steve fall in love.

After a successful singing debut, Steve is upset with Jane's determination to marry a wealthy man and returns to the juice stand. Irma finds trouble and plots to end her life. However, she learns that a radio contest is about to call her for a $50,000 question, so she rushes home to answer the phone, and she wins the prize.

== Cast ==
- John Lund as Al
- Marie Wilson as Irma Peterson
- Diana Lynn as Jane Stacy
- Don DeFore as Richard Rhinelander III
- Dean Martin as Steve Laird
- Jerry Lewis as Seymour
- Hans Conried as Professor Kropotkin
- Kathryn Givney as Mrs. Rhinelander
- Percy Helton as Mr. Z. Clyde
- Gloria Gordon as Mrs. O'Reilly, the Landlady

== Production ==
My Friend Irma was filmed from February 22 through April 12, 1949. Although production was already under way, producer Hal B. Wallis thought it would be a low-risk introduction of the team of Martin and Lewis to the screen. They had been approached by several film studios before signing a five-year contract with Paramount Pictures.

Lewis was originally cast to play Al, but after the first day of screen tests, it was obvious that he was wrong for the part. Concerned that he would be excluded from the film and that he and Dean Martin were abandoning the formula that had created their success, Lewis quickly devised the idea of playing a comic sidekick to Steve, and the character Seymour was written into the script.

Marie Wilson, Hans Conried and Gloria Gordon portray the same characters in the film as they played on the radio show. Felix Bressart was originally cast in the film as Professor Kropotkin, but he died suddenly during filming, with his completed scenes reshot with Conried.

The film was followed the next year by the sequel My Friend Irma Goes West, directed by Hal Walker, the only sequel that Martin and Lewis ever made.

== Reception ==
In a contemporary review for The New York Times, critic Bosley Crowther called My Friend Irma "a very dopey film" and wrote: "[T]he simple fact is that this nonsense about a female imbecile is pitched in that area of humor in which a plunge into a manhole is a wow. It is compounded of such witticisms as Irma's remark to another dame, 'You're a woman and I'm a woman, so let's discuss this thing man to man.' It is built on the jovial assumption that the funniest thing in the world is a blonde who is so dumb and dizzy that she thinks New Jersey is what Lana Turner wears. ... We could go along with the laughs which were fetched by a new mad comedian, Jerry Lewis by name. This freakishly built and acting young man, who has been seen in night clubs hereabouts with a collar-ad partner, Dean Martin, has a genuine comic quality. The swift eccentricity of his movements, the harrowing features of his face and the squeak of his vocal protestations, which are many and frequent, have flair. His idiocy constitutes a burlesque of an idiot, which is something else again. As a hanger-on in the wake of Irma, he's the funniest thing in this film."

== Home media ==
My Friend Irma has been released twice on DVD By Paramount Home Entertainment. It was originally released on a two-film collection with its sequel, My Friend Irma Goes West, on October 25, 2005. A year later, it was included on an eight-film DVD set Dean Martin and Jerry Lewis Collection: Volume One, released on October 31, 2006.

== Legacy ==
In the 2002 biopic Martin and Lewis, a scene depicts Lewis as wanting to play the role of Al, with producer Hal Wallis suggesting that he should instead play a new character, Seymour, to which Lewis reluctantly agrees.
