= Hollywood or Bust =

1956 film by Frank Tashlin

- Directed by: Frank Tashlin
- Written by: Erna Lazarus
- Produced by: Hal B. Wallis
- Starring: Dean Martin; Jerry Lewis; Pat Crowley; Maxie Rosenbloom; Anita Ekberg
- Cinematography: Daniel Fapp
- Edited by: Howard A. Smith
- Music by: Walter Scharf
- Production company: Hal Wallis Productions
- Distributed by: Paramount Pictures
- Release date: December 6, 1956
- Running time: 95 minutes
- Country: United States
- Language: English
- Box office: $3.3 million (US) ₣ 1,801,970 (France)

Hollywood or Bust is a 1956 American musical comedy film directed by Frank Tashlin and starring the team of Dean Martin and Jerry Lewis alongside Pat Crowley and Anita Ekberg. The picture was filmed from April 16 to June 19, 1956, and released on December 6, 1956, by Paramount Pictures, almost five months after the Martin and Lewis partnership split up.

== Plot ==
Malcolm Smith wins a brand new automobile (a 1956 Chrysler New Yorker convertible) at a movie theatre raffle. Steve Wiley, a gambler from New York, obtains a counterfeit of the winning ticket and also claims that the car is his. The theatre manager declares them both winners and that they can split the car any way that they want. Steve needs to sell the car to pay off a gambling debt, but Malcolm wants to drive it to Hollywood to meet actress Anita Ekberg.

Steve claims to know Ekberg, and agrees to drive to Hollywood with Malcolm, secretly planning to steal the car. Malcolm brings along his dog, a huge Great Dane named Mr. Bascomb who foils Steve in his many attempts to make off with the car.

Along the way they pick up Terry, an aspiring dancer, who has a job waiting for her in Las Vegas. Once there, Malcolm gets his "lucky feeling" and wins $10,000 ($118,400 today) at a casino. In addition, the woman of his dreams, Anita Ekberg, is also at the hotel and Malcolm finally gets to meet her, with hilarious results.

Steve begins to show a change of heart. He not only agrees to go along with Malcolm to Hollywood without stealing the car, but he also proposes to Terry.

Malcolm spoils the mood by telling them that he no longer has any of his casino winnings, having used it on a gift for Anita. Steve decides to retrieve the gift and they head to Paramount Pictures to locate her. After some back-lot adventures, they find Anita, who agrees to return the gift in exchange for the services of Mr. Bascomb in her next movie.

== Cast ==
- Dean Martin as Steve Wiley
- Jerry Lewis as Malcolm Smith
- Pat Crowley as Terry Roberts
- Maxie Rosenbloom as Bookie Benny
- Anita Ekberg as herself
- Richard Alexander as Western actor
- Adelle August as Dancer
- Chet Brandenburg as Stagehand
- Kathryn Card as Elderly lady
- Franklyn Farnum as Audience member
- Joe Gray as Gambler
- Richard Karlan as Sammy Ross
- Deana Martin as 7-year-old girl
- Torben Meyer as Waiter
- Wendell Niles as himself
- Suzanne Ridgway as Woman at craps table
- Charles Sullivan as Audience member
- Willard Waterman as Manager Neville
- Ben Welden as Boss
- Frank Wilcox as Director
- Chief Yowlachie as Chief Running Water
- Beach Dickerson as Bellboy (uncredited)
- Minta Durfee as Miss Pettywood (uncredited)

== Production ==
=== Filming ===
This was the last film that Jerry Lewis and Dean Martin appeared in together. According to Lewis in his autobiography Dean and Me, he and Martin did not speak to each other off-camera during the entire film shoot. In addition, Lewis claimed that this was the only one of his films that he had never seen, citing it as too painful to watch.

The service station scenes were filmed on Live Oak Street in Thousand Oaks, California.

== Home media ==
The film was included on a five-film DVD set, the Dean Martin and Jerry Lewis Collection: Volume Two, released on June 5, 2007.

== Legacy ==
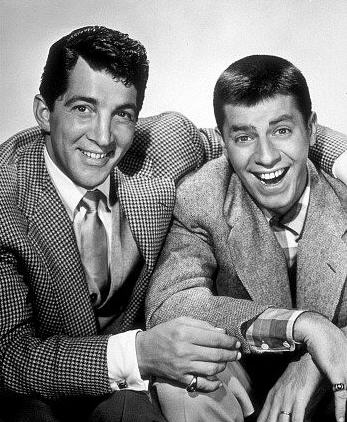
Martin and Lewis

In Paramount's film The Godfather (1972), a scene of the Las Vegas strip, including a shot of the Sands Hotel marquee showing an appearance by Martin and Lewis, was taken from this film.

In Paramount's musical film Grease (1978), during the drive-in theater scene, a clip of the theatrical trailer for the film is shown, as projected on the drive-in's screen.
