= Dick Stabile =

American jazz musician (1909–1980)

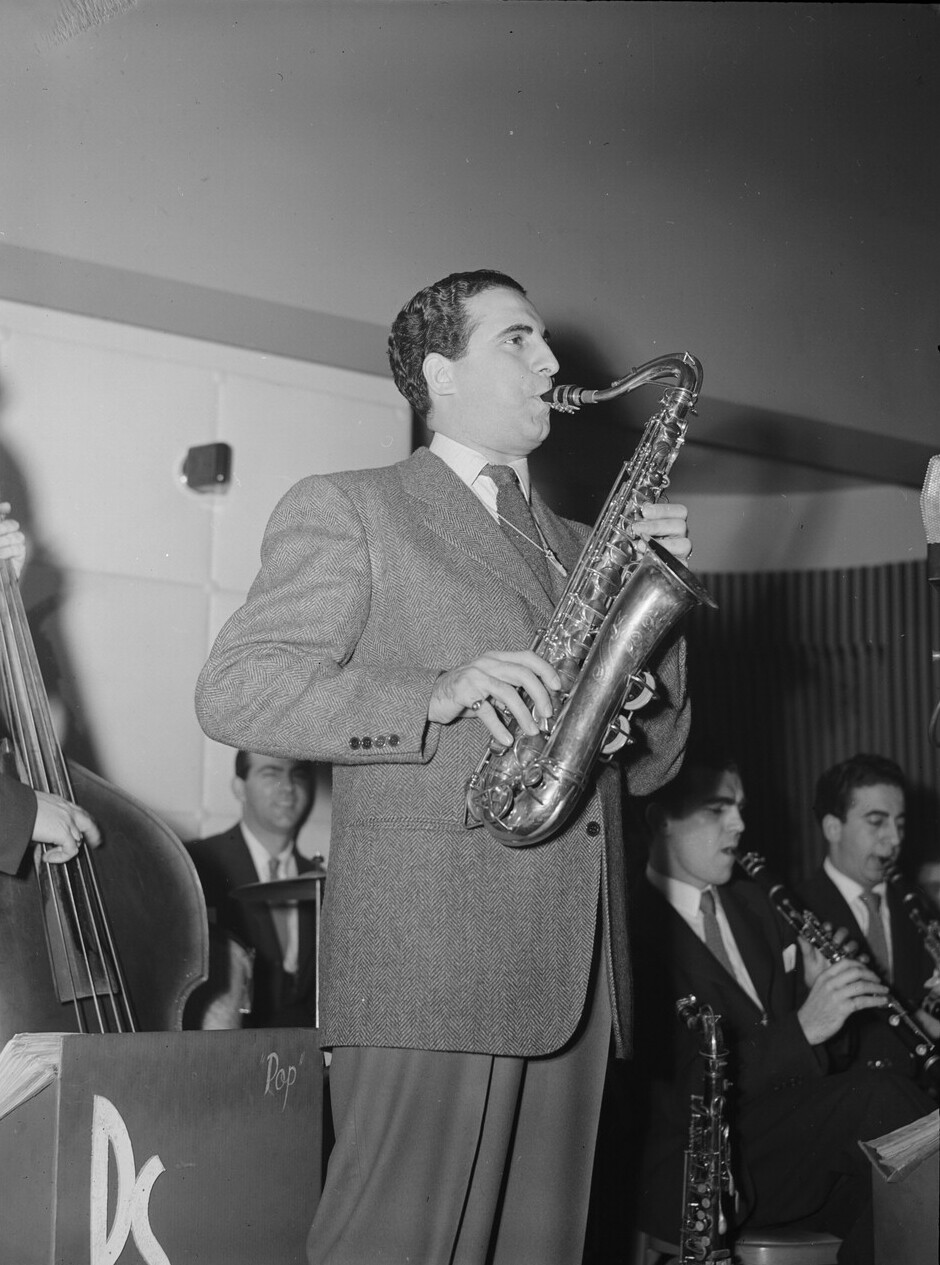
- Stabile in New York in the 1940s

Background information
- Born: Richard Dominic Stabile; May 29, 1909; Newark, New Jersey, U.S.
- Died: September 18, 1980 (aged 71) New Orleans, Louisiana, U.S.
- Genres: Jazz, big band
- Occupations: Musician, band leader, music director
- Instruments: Saxophone and clarinet
- Years active: 1928–1980
- Labels: Decca, Bluebird, Vocalion

Richard Dominic Stabile (May 29, 1909 – September 18, 1980) was an American jazz saxophonist, clarinetist, and bandleader.

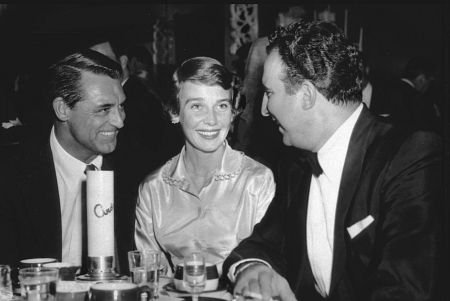
Cary Grant, Betsy Drake, Dick Stabile (1955)

== Career ==
He was born in Newark, New Jersey, United States. The son of a band leader and violinist, Stabile learned piano and violin at an early age. His father got a job with band leader Vincent Lopez on the condition that he learn saxophone. Seeing his father play, Stabile started playing saxophone, too, and was hired by Jules Ansel at the Brunswick Hotel in Newark. He then went on tour with band leader Ben Bernie, Ansel's cousin, and remained with Bernie from 1928 to 1936, appearing on Bernie's weekly radio show as lead alto saxophonist and soloist.

In 1936, Stabile started his own ensemble, the All-America "Swing" Band, which featured Bunny Berigan, Dave Barbour, Frank Signorelli, and Stan King. He recorded with vocalists such as Berigan, Paula Kelly, Burt Shaw, and Gracie Barrie, the last of which he would go on to marry. During this time, he recorded for the labels Decca, Bluebird, ARC, and Vocalion/Okeh. His band worked often in hotels in New York City, and was chosen to play at the New York World's Fair in 1959–60.

During World War II Stabile led a band while serving in the Coast Guard; Gracie Barrie led his own ensemble in his absence. After the war, he moved to Los Angeles and became music director for Dean Martin and Jerry Lewis, and had a small role as 'Private Pokey' in their film, At War with the Army.

After spending the latter 1960s leading dance bands at Los Angeles ballrooms, Stabile took a job at the Hotel Roosevelt in New Orleans, where he worked from the middle of the 1970s until his death from a heart attack in 1980.

== Vocalists ==
Evelyn Oaks sang with Stabile's orchestra in 1939, and Paula Kelly sang with him prior to joining the Glenn Miller Orchestra in 1941.

== Instruments ==
Stabile designed a line of saxophones and clarinets that carried his name.

== Personal life ==
Stabile was married to and divorced from Gracie Barrie.

Stabile was the cousin of singer Dolly Dawn (aka Theresa Stabile)

== Discography ==
=== As leader ===
- Dick Stabile Plays for You (Bethlehem, 1957)
- At the Statler (Tops, 1957)
- Dancing on the Sunset Strip (King, 1959)
- This Cat Really Blows! (Dot, 1960)
