= Sailor Beware (1952 film) =

1952 film by Hal Walker

- Theatrical release poster
- Directed by: Hal Walker
- Screenplay by: James Allardice; Martin Rackin
- Based on: Sailor Beware! 1933 play by Kenyon Nicholson; Charles Robinson
- Produced by: Hal B. Wallis
- Starring: Jerry Lewis; Dean Martin; Marion Marshall; Corinne Calvet; Leif Erickson
- Cinematography: Daniel L. Fapp
- Edited by: Warren Low
- Music by: Joseph J. Lilley
- Distributed by: Paramount Pictures
- Release date: February 9, 1952
- Running time: 108 minutes
- Country: United States
- Language: English
- Box office: $4.3 million (US); 854,588 admissions (France)

Sailor Beware is a 1952 American comedy film directed by Hal Walker and starring the comedy team of Martin and Lewis. It is an adaption of a 1933 Kenyon Nicholson and Charles Robinson play of the same name. It was released on February 9, 1952, by Paramount Pictures. The working title was At Sea with the Navy.

It was the fifth film collaboration of Dean Martin and Jerry Lewis, who would make 16 movies together before their partnership's end.

== Plot ==
After meeting in the Navy recruiting line, Al Crowthers and Melvin Jones become friends. Al has tried to enlist before, 11 times, but was always rejected because of a bad knee. However, he keeps trying so that he can impress women. Melvin, meanwhile, is allergic to women's cosmetics and his doctor prescribed ocean travel, so he decided to join the Navy as this was the only way he could afford to follow doctor's orders.

Unbeknownst to Al, the naval requirements have been lowered and this time he has been accepted, as has Melvin. They are assigned to Lardoski, a bully they met in line and referred to as "fathead."

While based in San Diego, Melvin falls in love with Hilda Jones, a woman who does not wear makeup. Melvin seems to attract many women, so Lardoski wagers with Al, betting that Melvin must get a kiss from any girl Lardoski names. Al agrees and Lardoski picks Corinne Calvet, who is performing at a nightclub in Honolulu. The crew then get sent out on the next submarine to Hawaii, with Melvin caught on deck when the ship is submerging. Upon his rescue he is tied to a torpedo for the rest of the voyage to avoid any more incidents.

Once in Hawaii, Al romances Corinne at the same time Melvin vies for her affection in order to gain a kiss to win the bet, which his shipmates have informed him about. Melvin is unsuccessful in comforting Hilda, who becomes jealous. Lardoski tries to prevent the kiss by getting the shore patrol to arrest Melvin, but after disguising himself as a hula dancer, Melvin gains the kiss. Al wins the bet (and Corinne), and Melvin works things out with Hilda.

== Cast ==
- Jerry Lewis as Melvin Jones
- Dean Martin as Al Crowthers
- Corinne Calvet as Corinne Calvet, herself
- Marion Marshall as Hilda Jones
- Robert Strauss as CPO Lardoski
- Leif Erickson as Cmdr. Lane
- Don Wilson as Mr. Chubby
- Vince Edwards as Blayden (billed as Vincent Edwards)
- Skip Homeier as Mac
- Dan Barton as 'Bama
- Mike Mahoney as Tiger
- Mary Treen as Ginger

=== Cameos ===
- Betty Hutton has an unbilled cameo as Dean's girlfriend, who is curiously named Hetty Button.
- James Dean, uncredited and still an unknown, appears briefly in one of the scenes in the locker room as a trainer, and even has a line of dialogue: "That guy's a professional!" He can also be seen as a cornerman in the boxing scene.
- Duke Mitchell appears briefly as the cornerman in the boxing scene. He would later team with Sammy Petrillo and star in Bela Lugosi Meets a Brooklyn Gorilla, in which they play Martin and Lewis-like characters.

== Production ==
Sailor Beware was filmed from September 5, 1951, through October 12, 1951.

== Re-release ==
The film was re-released on a double-bill with another Martin and Lewis film, Jumping Jacks in 1957. It was re-released a second time in 1968.

== Home media ==
The film was included on an eight-film DVD set, the Dean Martin and Jerry Lewis Collection: Volume One, released on October 31, 2006.
