= Martin and Lewis =

American comedy duo (1946–1956)

Dean Martin and Jerry Lewis
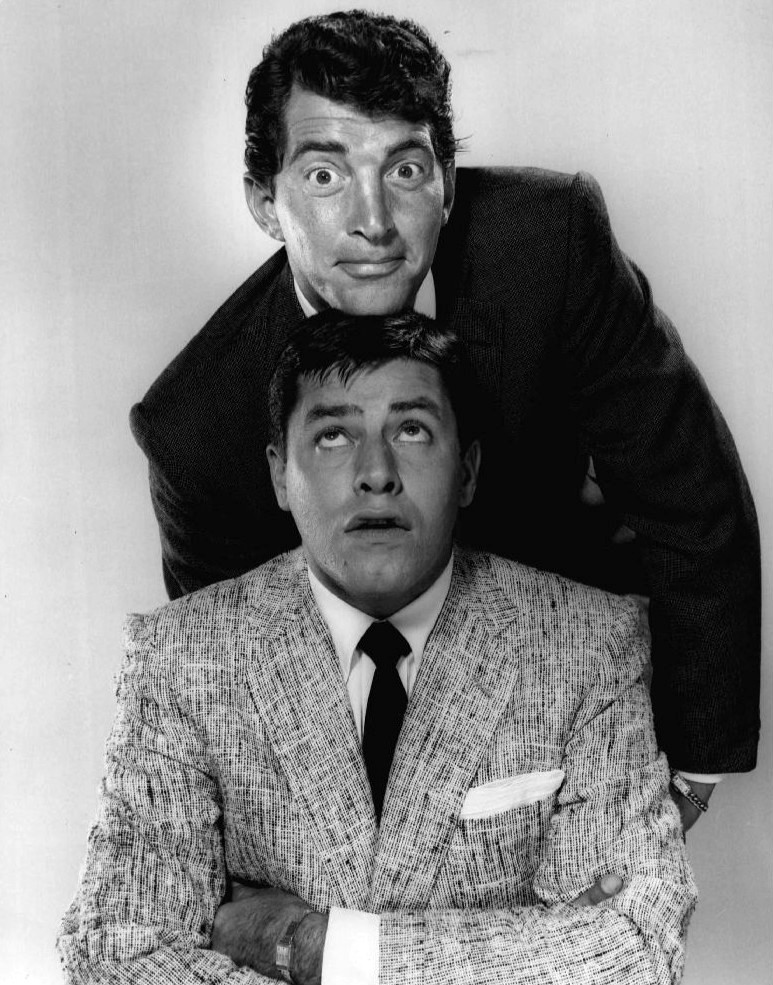
- Martin (top) and Lewis (bottom) appearing on The Colgate Comedy Hour
- Notable work: The Martin and Lewis Show; The Colgate Comedy Hour (TV series)

Comedy career
- Years active: 1946–1956
- Medium: Film, television, radio, nightclubs

Martin and Lewis were an American comedy duo, comprising singer Dean Martin and comedian Jerry Lewis. They met in 1944 and debuted at Atlantic City's 500 Club on July 25, 1946; the team lasted ten years to the day. Before they teamed up, Martin was a nightclub singer, while Lewis performed an act lip-synching to records.

They performed in nightclubs, and, starting in 1949, on radio. Later they branched out into television and films. In their early radio days they performed as Martin and Lewis but later became hugely popular as Dean Martin and Jerry Lewis. These full names helped them launch successful solo careers after parting.

== Nightclubs performers ==
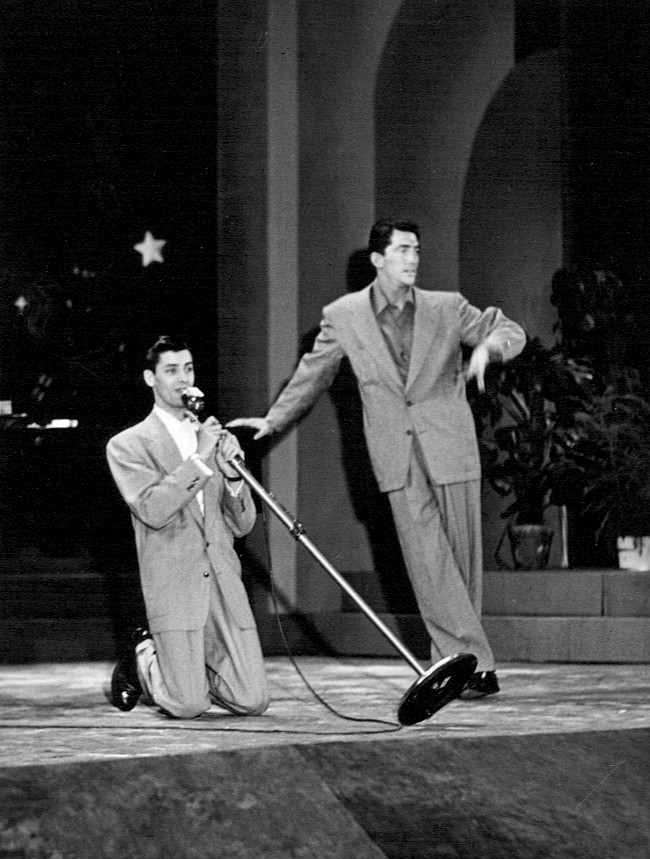
Martin and Lewis on Ed Sullivan's The Toast of the Town in 1948

In 1944, Dean Martin met a young Jerry Lewis at the Glass Hat Club at the Belmont Plaza Hotel in New York City, where both men were performing. Martin and Lewis debuted at Atlantic City's 500 Club on July 25, 1946, when Lewis suggested to the club owner that Martin would be a good replacement for the scheduled singer who was unavailable.

The duo was initially not well received. The owner, Skinny D'Amato, threatened to terminate their contract if the act did not improve. Martin and Lewis disposed of pre-scripted gags and began improvising. Martin sang, and Lewis dressed as a busboy, dropping plates and making a shambles of Martin's songs and a mockery of the club's decorum. They performed slapstick and delivered vaudeville jokes to great fanfare. Their success at the 500 Club led to a series of well-paying engagements along the Eastern Seaboard, culminating with a run at New York's Copacabana Club.

The highlights of their act included Lewis interrupting and heckling Martin while he was trying to sing, which ultimately led to the two of them chasing each other around the stage.

== Radio, television, and films ==
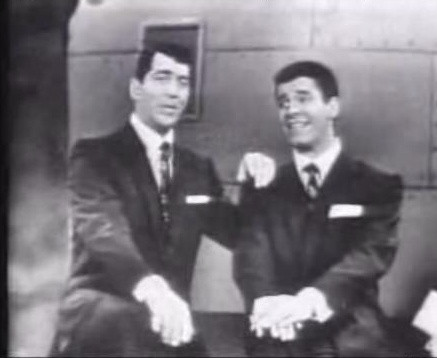
Martin and Lewis in an episode of The Colgate Comedy Hour

An NBC radio series, The Martin and Lewis Show, ran from 1948 to 1953. Martin and Lewis made a key appearance on the first episode of Ed Sullivan's show, Toast of the Town, in June 1948, although they may have appeared on TV earlier on Hour Glass, the first TV variety show which aired from May 1946 – March 1947, during the time the duo first paired up formally. On October 3 and 10, 1948, the team were stars on the first two episodes of the NBC live television variety show Welcome Aboard – a kinescope survives of this live TV broadcast in the UCLA Film and Television Archive.

On April 3, 1949, they debuted on their TV version of their "Martin & Lewis" radio show on the NBC-TV network, with guest Bob Hope, with their inaugural program drawing lackluster reviews in the April 30, 1949, issue of Billboard magazine. Lewis hired young comedy writers Norman Lear and Ed Simmons to improve their act. By 1950, Lear and Simmons were the main writers for Martin and Lewis.

Also in 1949, Martin and Lewis were signed by Paramount Pictures producer Hal Wallis as comedy relief for the film My Friend Irma.

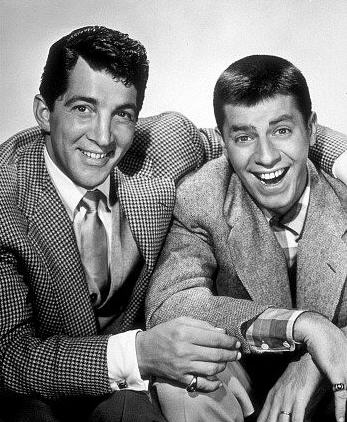
Lewis and Martin in 1950

Martin was thrilled to be out of New York City, a place he had developed a lifelong discomfort with, and he also had a dislike of tall buildings. Martin mostly avoided elevators due to claustrophobia. He did not like climbing multiple flights of stairs in tall buildings or taking the elevator if he needed to go to a high floor. Even when his success allowed him to lease an apartment in a Manhattan highrise building, he chose one on the third floor. He liked Los Angeles and the fact that it had few tall buildings at the time.

Their agent, Abby Greshler, negotiated for them one of Hollywood's best deals. They received $75,000 between them for their films with Wallis, a respectable film salary in the 1940s. Martin and Lewis were also free to do one outside film a year, which they would co-produce through their own York Productions. Their first starring feature was the independently produced At War with the Army (1950). They also had complete control of their club, radio, and television appearances, as well as their recording contracts. These collectively earned Martin and Lewis millions of dollars. They made regular appearances on NBC's Colgate Comedy Hour during the 1950s.

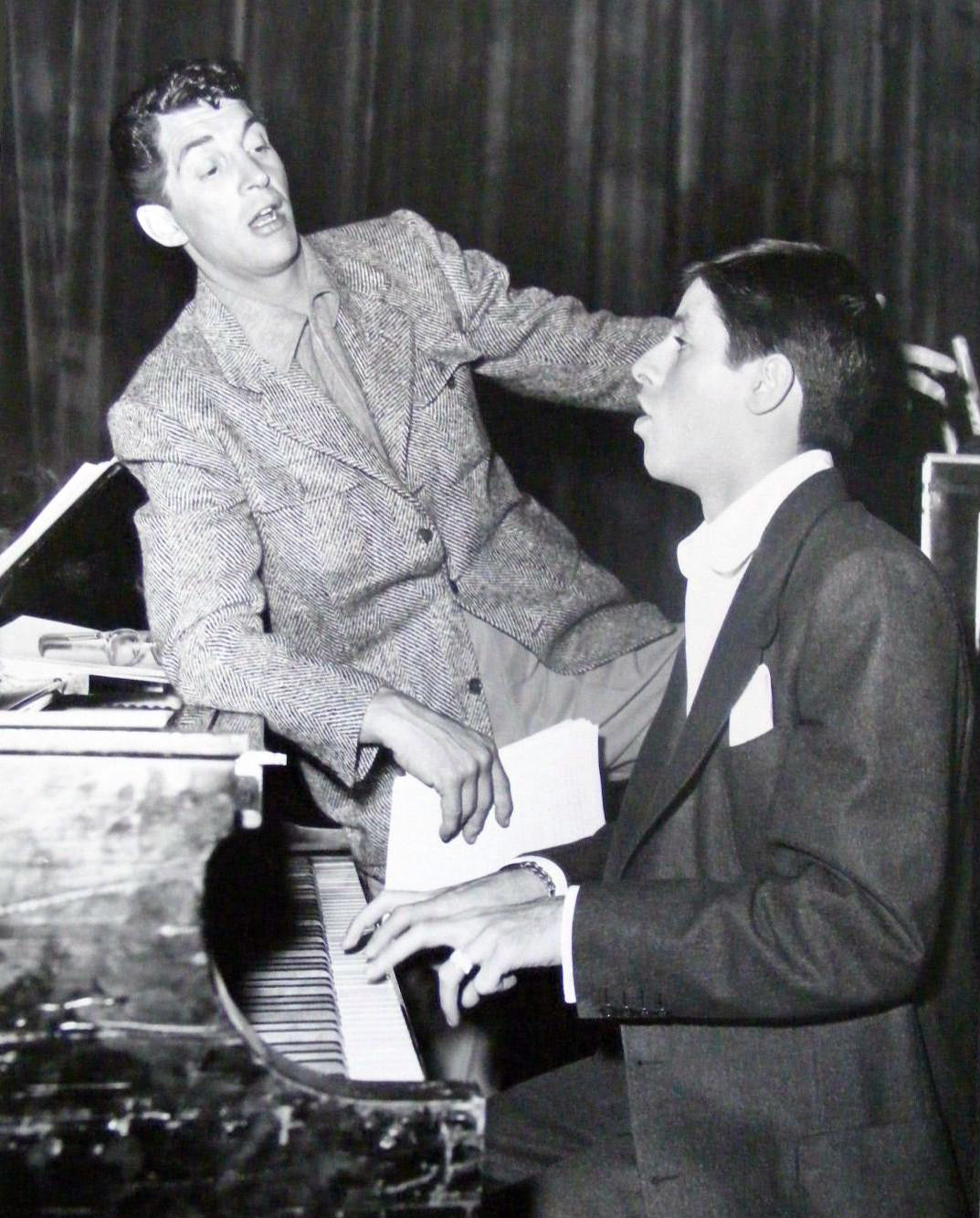
The Colgate Comedy Hour

Their Comedy Hour shows consisted of musical song and dance from their nightclub act or movies, with Dick Stabile's big band, sketch comedy with slapstick or satires of current films and TV shows, Martin's solo songs, and Lewis's solo pantomimes, physical numbers or conducting the orchestra. Martin and Lewis often broke out of character, ad-libbing and breaking the fourth wall. This early television show established their popularity nationwide.

Although there had been a number of hugely successful film teams before, Martin and Lewis were a new kind of duo. Both were talented entertainers, but the fact that they were such good friends on and off stage took their act to a new level. Lewis later offered an explanation for their success:

Who were Dean's fans? Men, women, the Italians. Who were Jerry's fans? Women, Jews, kids. Who were Martin and Lewis' fans? All of them... You had fans that didn't care that Lewis was on or that Martin was singing. Because if Dean was singing, that was Martin and Lewis. If Jerry was goin' nuts, that was Martin and Lewis.

Martin and Lewis were the hottest act in America during the early '50s, as well as the highest paid act in show business, according to a 1951 Life magazine article. The duo was featured in that magazine while on its most-successful movie tour, promoting That's My Boy. The tour was so successful, audience members would not leave their seats, so Martin and Lewis began doing "free shows" afterwards on fire escapes or out their dressing room windows, jamming the streets with adoring fans hoping to catch a prize – a hat, a shoe, maybe an autograph. However, the pace and the pressure soon took their toll. Martin usually had the thankless job of the straight man, and his singing had yet to develop into the unique style of his later years. The critics praised Lewis, and while they admitted that Martin was the best partner he could have, most of them claimed that Lewis was the real talent of the team and could succeed with anyone. Lewis praised Martin in his book Dean & Me, where he called Martin one of the great comic geniuses of all time.

=== Breakup ===
Over the course of their contract with Hal Wallis, during which they co-starred in sixteen feature films, all released through Paramount, the pair's relationship became increasingly strained, with Martin chafing under his perennial straight-man roles, as Lewis's comic antics came to dominate their films. During the shooting of what was to be their final film together, Hollywood or Bust, during the spring and early summer of 1956, their mutual animosity reached the point where, as Lewis later related, "I wouldn't tell Dean what I thought of him, so [director] Frank Tashlin took all the flack." For his part, Martin at one point angrily told Lewis that he was "nothing to me but a fucking dollar sign." After the film completed principal photography on June 19, their professional breakup was widely reported in the press, although they subsequently fulfilled a contractual obligation with a farewell engagement at the Copacabana Club, which ended on July 25, 1956, ten years to the day from their first official teaming in Atlantic City. Hollywood or Bust was released that December. Lewis later stated that it was the only one of his films he had never seen, citing it as too painful to watch.

== After the split ==
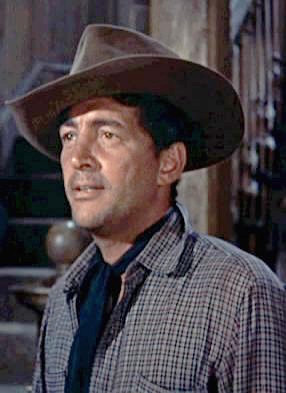
Dean Martin in Rio Bravo (1959)

According to Lewis, the two did not speak to each other privately for twenty years, about which Lewis later commented, "the stupidity of that, I cannot expound on. The ignorance of that is something I hope I'll always forget."

Martin's career arguably reached new heights after the team split up, as a recording artist for the Capitol and Reprise labels, as a movie actor both on his own (Rio Bravo, The Young Lions, the Matt Helm series) and as a member of the Rat Pack (Ocean's 11, Sergeants 3, Robin and the 7 Hoods), and with his own 1965–1974 television variety series, The Dean Martin Show.

Lewis remained with Paramount Pictures, appearing in and directing a succession of commercially successful films on his own (The Bellboy, The Nutty Professor), at one point becoming Paramount's biggest star. He also continued with his philanthropic work, which had begun while still partnered with Martin, hosting telethons for muscular dystrophy research until 2010.

In 1958, Lewis was the guest on an episode of NBC's The Eddie Fisher Show and was bantering with the host when Martin emerged from behind the curtain and said, "Don't sing. Do what you want but don't sing!" Martin was then immediately "pulled back" by singer Bing Crosby. Martin said something else, but the rest of his words were drowned out by the wildly excited reaction from the audience. Martin's entire appearance was just eight seconds long, and Crosby was on camera for two seconds. When the applause died down, Lewis crooned the title of Martin's then-current hit "Return to Me" after which Fisher sang a few bars of Crosby's theme song "Where the Blue of the Night (Meets the Gold of the Day)".

In 1960, four years after they broke up, Martin and Lewis briefly reunited, seemingly without prearrangement. Both were performing separate acts at the Sands Hotel in Las Vegas, a club they frequently played while they were together. Lewis caught Martin's closing act and Martin introduced his former partner to the audience, bringing him on stage. For about 15 minutes, they joked a bit and sang a duet of "Come Back to Me". However, the reunion was never duplicated. Later in 1960, when Lewis was rushing to finish The Bellboy and was too exhausted to perform his stage act, Martin replaced him. The two were also filmed laughing together in 1961 outside Eddie Fisher's opening at the Cocoanut Grove nightclub in Los Angeles.

The two men reconciled in September 1976, after Frank Sinatra orchestrated a surprise appearance by Martin on Lewis's annual Labor Day telethon for the Muscular Dystrophy Association, saying only "I have a friend who loves what you do every year." The pair beamed and embraced, and then had a few minutes of friendly banter, during which Lewis asked Martin, "Uh, so, you workin'?" According to Dean's daughter, Deana Martin, Frank had hidden Dean in Ed McMahon's dressing room where he was then briefly spotted by Jerry's son, Gary Lewis. To be safe, he didn't say anything to his father and the surprise went off without a hitch. The brief reunion was national news and, according to Lewis, the two spoke "every day after that".

In 1987, when Martin's son, Dean Paul Martin, was killed in an airplane crash, Lewis attended the funeral unannounced, sat in the back, and did not reveal his presence to Martin. According to Lewis's 2005 memoir Dean & Me and Deana Martin's 2004 book Memories Are Made of This, when Martin found out about it soon after the funeral, he called Lewis and talked to him for about an hour. In 1989, the two reunited for the last time on Martin's 72nd birthday at Bally's Hotel and Casino in Las Vegas, where Martin was doing a week of shows. Lewis presented him with a birthday cake, thanked him for all the years he gave joy to the world, and finally joked, "Why we broke up, I'll never know." This would be the last public reunion of the duo before Martin's death on Christmas Day 1995.

Lewis published an affectionate memoir of his partnership with Martin called Dean & Me: A Love Story in 2005.

=== Biopic ===
Martin and Lewis is a 2002 biographical CBS television movie which portrays the lives of Dean Martin and Jerry Lewis. Directed by John Gray and starring Jeremy Northam as Martin and Sean Hayes as Lewis, the film depicts the years from 1946 to 1956, spanning the entirety of their partnership from the beginning until the end.

== Filmography ==
Year	Movie	Jerry Lewis role	Dean Martin role	Notes
1949	My Friend Irma	Seymour	Steve Laird	Film debut
1950	My Friend Irma Goes West	Seymour	Steve Laird	
1950	At War with the Army	PFC Alvin Korwin	Sgt. Victor Puccinelli	Filmed before My Friend Irma Goes West
1951	That's My Boy	"Junior" Jackson	Bill Baker	
1952	Sailor Beware	Melvin Jones	Al Crowthers	
1952	Jumping Jacks	Hap Smith	Chick Allen	
1952	Road to Bali	"Woman" in Lala's Dream	Man in Lala's Dream	Cameo. First appearance in color.
1952	The Stooge	Theodore Rogers	Bill Miller	Filmed before Sailor Beware and Jumping Jacks
1953	Scared Stiff	Myron Mertz	Larry Todd	Remake of The Ghost Breakers
1953	The Caddy	Harvey Miller Jr.	Joe Anthony	
1953	Money from Home	Virgil Yokum	Herman "Honey Talk" Nelson	Filmed in 3-D.
1954	Living It Up	Homer Flagg	Dr. Steve Harris	Remake of Nothing Sacred
1954	3 Ring Circus	Jerome F. Hotchkiss	Pete Nelson	Re-edited and re-released in 1978 as Jerrico the Wonder Clown
1955	You're Never Too Young	Wilbur Hoolick	Bob Miles	Remake of The Major and the Minor
1955	Artists and Models	Eugene Fullstack	Rick Todd	
1956	Pardners	Wade Kingsley Sr. / Wade Kingsley Jr.	Slim Mosley Sr. / Slim Mosley Jr.	Partial Remake of Rhythm on the Range
1956	Hollywood or Bust	Malcolm Smith	Steve Wiley	Last film together

== Tribute show ==
In 2016, a tribute show called Dean and Jerry: What Might Have Been, starring Derek Marshall as Martin and Nicholas Arnold as Lewis, started touring North America. Its first performance took place at The Orillia Opera House.

== See also ==
- Old time radio
