= Warren Low =

American film editor

- Born: August 12, 1905; Pittsburgh, Pennsylvania, U.S.
- Died: July 27, 1989 (aged 83); Woodland Hills, Los Angeles, California, U.S.
- Occupation: Film editor

Warren Low (August 12, 1905 – July 27, 1989) was an American film editor who worked on Now, Voyager, Out of the Fog, and others. He was an originator for what became the American Cinema Editors and received awards from them.

== Partial filmography ==
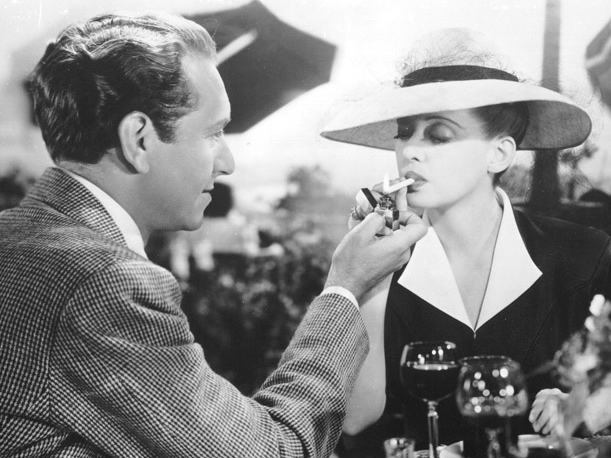
Low was film editor for Now, Voyager, featuring Paul Henreid and Bette Davis

- 1936 Satan Met a Lady as Editing.
- 1936 Isle of Fury as Editing.
- 1936 The White Angel as Editing.
- 1937 The Great O'Malley as Editing.
- 1937 The Great Garrick as Editing.
- 1937 Marry the Girl as Editing.
- 1937 The Life of Emile Zola as Editing.
- 1938 The Kid Comes Back as Editing.
- 1938 The Sisters as Editing.
- 1938 The Amazing Dr. Clitterhouse as Editing.
- 1938 Jezebel as Editing.
- 1939 Dust Be My Destiny as Editing.
- 1939 Juarez as Editing.
- 1940 The Letter as Editing.
- 1940 All This and Heaven Too as Film Editor.
- 1940 A Dispatch from Reuter's as Film Editor.
- 1940 Dr. Ehrlich's Magic Bullet as Film Editor.
- 1941 Out of the Fog as Film Editor.
- 1941 Shining Victory as Film Editor.
- 1941 One Foot in Heaven as Film Editor.
- 1942 Now, Voyager as Film Editor.
- 1942 Juke Girl as Film Editor.
- 1942 The Gay Sisters as Film Editor.
- 1943 Princess O'Rourke as Film Editor.
- 1944 The Adventures of Mark Twain as Film Editor.
- 1946 We are Not Alone as Film Editor.
- 1949 Sorry, Wrong Number as Film Editor.
- 1949 Rope of Sand as Film Editor.
- 1950 Dark City as Film Editor.
- 1950 September Affair as Editing Supervisor.
- 1952 Come Back, Little Sheba as Editing Supervisor.
- 1951 Red Mountain as Film Editor.
- 1953 Scared Stiff as Film Editor.
- 1955 The Rose Tattoo as Editing Supervisor.
- 1956 The Bad Seed as Film Editor.
- 1957 Gunfight at the O.K. Corral as Editing Supervisor.
- 1958 King Creole as Film Editor.
- 1961 Summer and Smoke as Film Editor.
- 1962 A Girl Named Tamiko as Film Editor.
- 1963 Wives and Lovers as Film Editor.
- 1965 The Sons of Katie Elder as Film Editor.
- 1965 Boeing Boeing as Film Editor.
- 1966 Paradise, Hawaiian Style as Film Editor.
- 1967 Waterhole No. 3 as Film Editor.
- 1967 Oh Dad, Poor Dad, Mamma's Hung You in the Closet and I'm Feelin' So Sad as Film Editor.
- 1968 5 Card Stud as Film Editor.
- 1968 Will Penny as Film Editor.
- 1969 True Grit as Film Editor.
- 1971 Willard as Editing Supervisor.
