= Katie Wagner =

American journalist (born 1964)

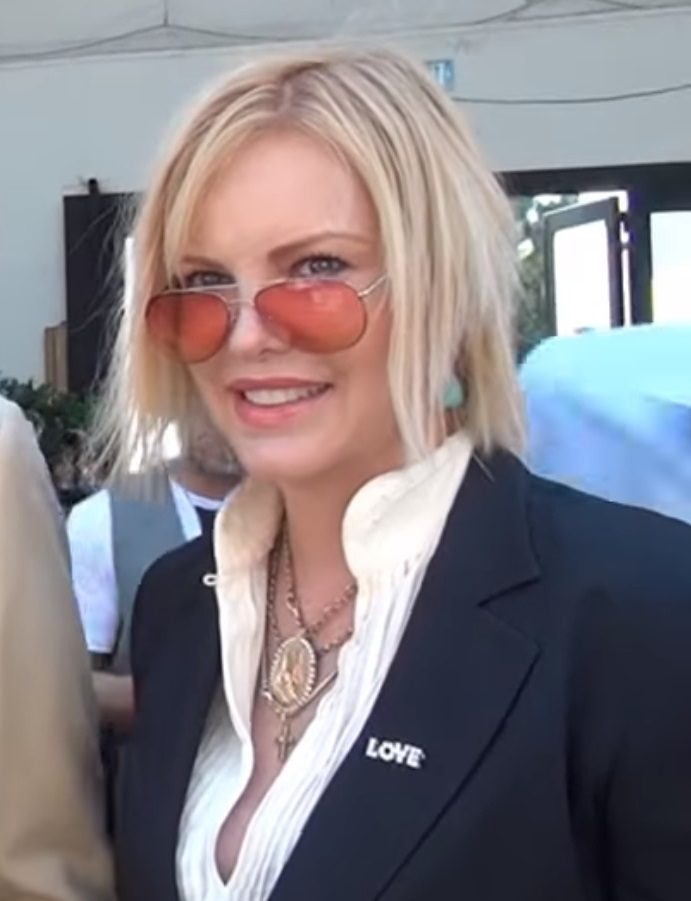
- Wagner interviewed on MBN Newsvideoweb in 2013
- Born: Katharine Wagner; May 11, 1964 (age 62); Los Angeles, California, U.S.
- Occupations: TV host, entertainment reporter
- Notable credit(s): The Starlet, Lifestyles of the Rich and Famous, Live From the House of Blues
- Spouse: Leif Lewis (m. 2007)
- Children: 1
- Parents: Robert Wagner (father); Marion Marshall (mother)
- Relatives: Joshua Donen (half-brother); Courtney Wagner (half-sister); Jill St. John (stepmother); Natasha Gregson Wagner (stepsister)

Katharine "Katie" Wagner (born May 11, 1964) is an American television personality and Hollywood reporter. She is best known as the hostess for TV Guide Channel from 1999 to 2004.

== Early life ==
Wagner was born in Los Angeles, California. Her parents are actress Marion Marshall and actor Robert Wagner, who divorced in 1971.

On her mother's side she has two older half-brothers, Joshua Donen and Peter Donen. On her father's side, she has a younger half-sister, Courtney Wagner. She has a stepsister, Natasha Gregson Wagner, from her father's marriage to Natalie Wood. Her stepmother is Jill St. John. Wood was her stepmother from July 1972 until her death on November 29, 1981.

Wagner graduated from Beverly Hills High School in 1982 and attended Santa Barbara City College for a semester. After dropping out of college, she dabbled in modeling, which allowed her to live in Tokyo and London. She received a break in 1987 when she and her father were featured on the TV show Born Famous, when the show's host asked her what she hoped to do for a living, and she answered, "I would like to do what you do."

== Career ==
Wagner's first media job was for the Don Mischer special M & W on ABC, for which she interviewed Dan Aykroyd and his wife, Donna Dixon. This resulted in a two-and-a-half-year run at the Movietime Cable Network (Now E! Network). She went on to work at HBO, Cinemax, V, and MTV. At MTV, she guest-hosted from both coasts. She also co-hosted Awake on the Wildside, filled in for Chris Connelly on The Big Picture, and introduced videos at night.

For two years, she co-hosted an international entertainment show called Hollywood Report with Richard Jobson on ITV in Great Britain. The show was seen in 11 countries. Wagner then co-hosted 22 episodes of Live From the House of Blues on TBS.

She joined Robin Leach for the final two seasons of Lifestyles of the Rich and Famous as co host and contributing reporter. She was asked to narrate and co-produce Intimate Portrait: Natalie Wood, about her late stepmother. With the permission and cooperation of her family, Wagner shared private details of Wood's life for the first time.

In 1999, she began working for the TV Guide Channel. Her hosting duties included Music News, TV Talk, Family Do's and Don'ts, and What's On. In early June 2004, after four years, she left the TV Guide Channel. Later that year, she played a news reporter in the Charmed episode, "Styx Feet Under" and was a guest star on the talk show Good Day Live.

In 2005, Wagner was host of the WB show, The Starlet. She hosted an online radio show with psychic medium "Voxx" at The JOINT Studios called Inner View with Katie & Voxx until 2016.

== Personal life ==
Wagner dated Julian Lennon, Dweezil Zappa, Richard Grieco, and Steve Jones, and had a broken engagement with William Berretta.

On September 21, 2006, she gave birth to her only child, Riley John Wagner-Lewis. She married her boyfriend, Leif Lewis, on July 7, 2007.
