= Jill St. John =

American actress (born 1940)

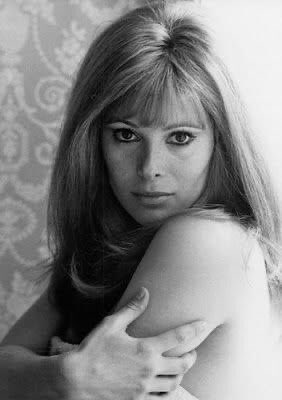
- St. John, c. 1970s
- Born: Jill Arlyn Oppenheim; August 19, 1940 (age 86); Los Angeles, California, U.S.
- Occupation: Actress
- Years active: 1946–2014
- Spouses: Neil Dubin (m. 1957; div. 1958) Lance Reventlow (m. 1960; div. 1963) Jack Jones (m. 1967; div. 1969) Robert Wagner (m. 1990)
- Relatives: Katie Wagner (stepdaughter); Natasha Gregson (de facto stepdaughter)

Jill St. John (born Jill Arlyn Oppenheim; August 19, 1940) is an American retired actress. She is best known for playing Tiffany Case, the first American Bond girl of the James Bond franchise, in 1971's Diamonds Are Forever. Additional performances in film include Holiday for Lovers, The Lost World, Tender Is the Night, Come Blow Your Horn, for which she received a Golden Globe nomination, Who's Minding the Store?, Honeymoon Hotel, The Liquidator, The Oscar, Tony Rome, Sitting Target and The Concrete Jungle.

On television, St. John has appeared in such top-rated shows as Batman, The Big Valley, Rowan & Martin's Laugh-In, Hart to Hart, Vega$, The Love Boat, Fantasy Island, Magnum, P.I. and Seinfeld. During her Hollywood heyday she was almost equally famous for her high-profile social life and frequent romantic associations with prominent public figures. St. John is married to actor Robert Wagner and has known him since she was 18 years old. They share credits on nearly a dozen screen and stage productions, notably the miniseries remake of Around the World in 80 Days.

== Early life ==
St. John was born Jill Arlyn Oppenheim at Queen of Angels Hospital in Los Angeles on August 19, 1940, to Edward Oppenheim, owner of the Red Log Restaurant in Westwood, and his philanthropist wife Betty (née Goldberg). She has no siblings, but grew up with many cousins, her mother being one of eight surviving children and her father one of three. St. John's parents married in 1934. Her maternal grandparents were Russian, of partial Jewish descent, while her paternal great-great-grandparents emigrated from Hessen, Germany and Amsterdam. With regard to religion, St. John has indicated she believes in God.

Raised in Encino, she was a member of the Panaieff Ballet Intime with Natalie Wood and Stefanie Powers, and attended elementary school with Nancy Sinatra. St. John never played with dolls as a young girl, instead preferring a toy cash register and money. When she was 13 and had already been working for several years, her stage mother Betty changed Jill's last name from Oppenheim to the more marketable St. John. If she were not an actress, she would have become either an oceanographer or a marine biologist, having studied the subjects at college.

== Career ==
St. John made her stage debut at age five in The Conspiracy at Geller's Theater Workshop on January 31, 1946. She describes herself during this period as "precocious. I could read really well by the age of six." Her television debut came in 1948 when she joined the cast of Sandy Dreams, a musical fantasy series for children featuring Richard Beymer. In December 1949, she played Missie Cratchit in The Christmas Carol, one of the earliest filmed adaptations of Charles Dickens' classic 1843 story. Shot in kinescope, it is a rare example of a 1940s live TV broadcast still surviving in entirety.

By the age of 10, St. John was a regular on KTLA's Fantastick Studios, Ink. At 11, she appeared in three episodes of The George Burns and Gracie Allen Show. She had an uncredited role in the film Thunder in the East (1951) and was in episodes of Sky King, Fireside Theatre, and Cavalcade of America.

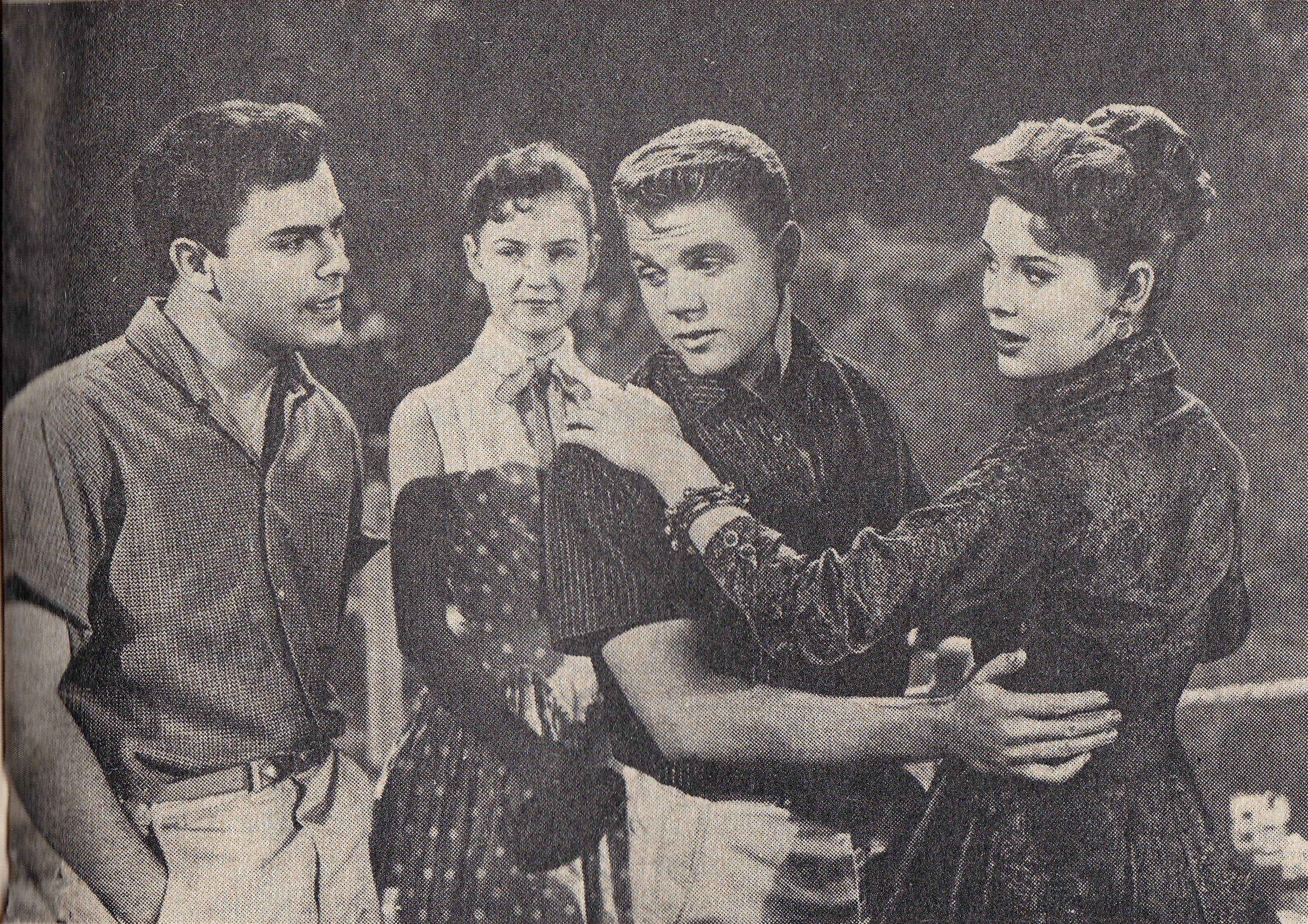
John Saxon, Shelley Fabares, John Wilder and St. John in Summer Love (1958)

St. John modeled dresses between her acting jobs and ballet lessons, and lamented how she "missed a lot of things kids do." She attended Powers Professional School and received her high school diploma from Hollywood Professional School in the spring of 1955 at age 14. (Note: She was able to graduate early because she had attended summer school for years.) At age 15, St. John enrolled at UCLA where it was discovered that she had an IQ of 162. During this time, she lent her voice to a large number of radio shows, notably Red Ryder, Dr. Christian, and One Man's Family.

St. John was 16 in May 1957 when Universal Pictures signed her to a contract for seven years starting at $200 a week. Her major studio film debut was in Summer Love (1958) starring John Saxon. She also appeared on TV in episodes of The Christophers, Schlitz Playhouse of Stars, and DuPont Show of the Month (an adaptation of Junior Miss). She said her idol was Kay Kendall. The Hollywood Makeup and Hair Stylists Guild selected St. John as one of 13 young actresses named Deb Stars of 1958, which led to her first of numerous appearances in Bob Hope variety specials.

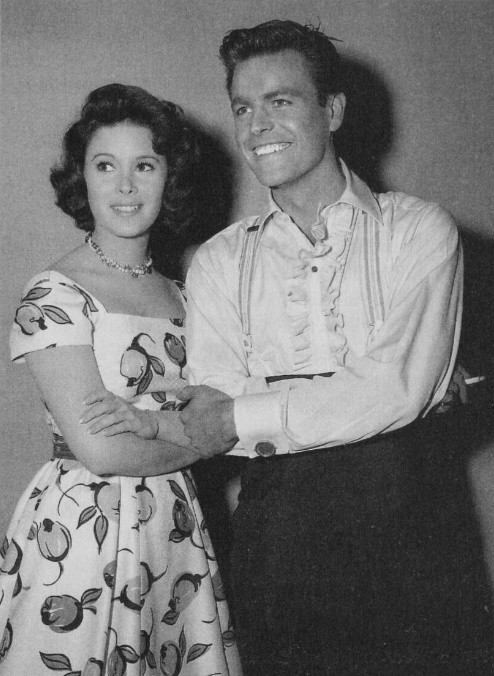
With Robert Wagner in 1959

St. John then signed a contract with 20th Century Fox, who tried to build her into a star. She played the daughter of Clifton Webb in The Remarkable Mr. Pennypacker and Holiday for Lovers (both 1959), then was put in an adventure movie, The Lost World (1960). "Nothing but starlet parts," she later said. "You know, the daughter, the niece, the girlfriend." After Fox picked up their option on her, Warner Bros. borrowed St. John for The Roman Spring of Mrs. Stone (1961), then she had a supporting role in Tender Is the Night (1962), for which she beat out Jane Fonda.

St. John had a key role in Come Blow Your Horn (1963), starring opposite Frank Sinatra. She received a Golden Globe Award nomination as Best Actress – Motion Picture Musical or Comedy for her performance. "I'm a comedienne," she said in 1963. "I've never pretended to be a dramatic actress. But I'm very funny." She followed this with a series of comedies: Who's Minding the Store? (1963) with Jerry Lewis, Who's Been Sleeping in My Bed? (1963) with Dean Martin, and Honeymoon Hotel (1964) with Robert Morse and Nancy Kwan.

"Now I play the sexy comedienne, which is my forte," she said in 1964. "Comedy is what I've always wanted to do." Though she considered Jerry Lewis a comic genius, St. John found working with him on Who's Minding the Store? to be an extremely unhappy and disappointing experience, commenting that "one should not confuse the artist with the man." She guest-starred on television shows like Burke's Law, The Rogues, Theatre of Stars, and Mr. Broadway. MGM gave her the female lead in The Liquidator (1965) opposite Rod Taylor, and she co-starred in The Oscar (1966) with Stephen Boyd.

St. John appeared in the first two episodes of the television series Batman as the Riddler's moll Molly. She became the first of only four characters to die during the series' run. She was also in an episode of The Big Valley at that time.

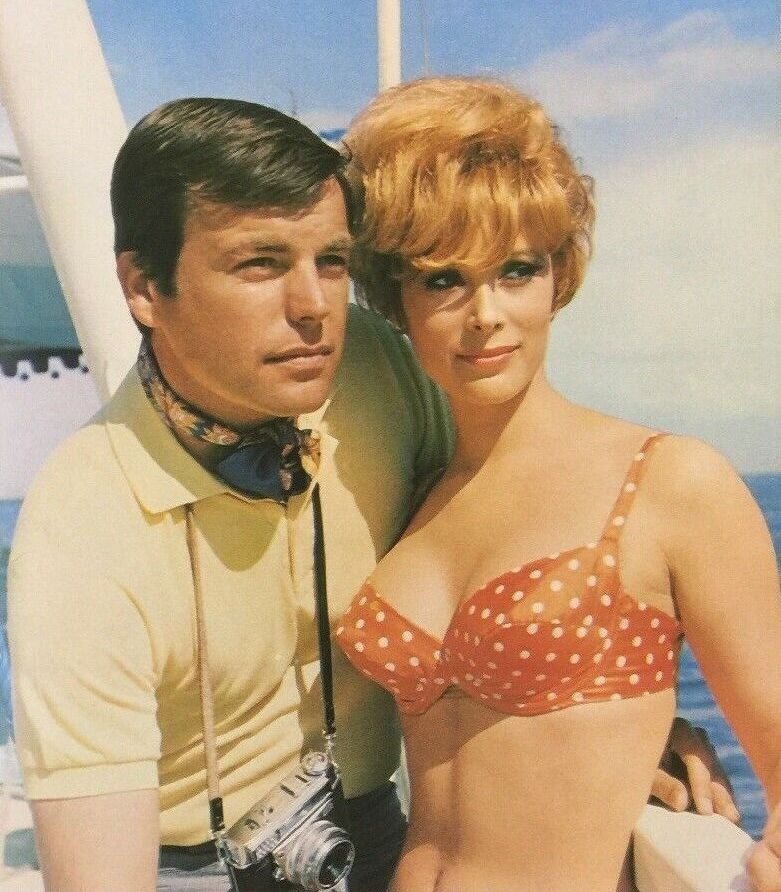
Wagner and St. John in How I Spent My Summer Vacation (1967)

Upon re-signing with Universal, St. John was in the TV movie Fame Is the Name of the Game (1966) and had a supporting role in How I Spent My Summer Vacation (1967), starring future husband Robert Wagner. She did the Bob Hope comedy Eight on the Lam (1967), then made Banning (1967) with Wagner and The King's Pirate (1967) with Doug McClure.

In 1966, she said "My goal is to be at a point where I have so proved myself as an actress that I can be more discriminating in the roles I choose. I want to be able to choose the parts I know I can do next." St. John nearly landed a starring role in The Fearless Vampire Killers (1967), which instead went to Sharon Tate. (Note: Tate also beat her out for the role of Jennifer North in Valley of the Dolls.)

She was reunited with Sinatra for Tony Rome (1967) and did a TV movie The Spy Killer (1969), which was popular enough for a sequel Foreign Exchange (1970). She guested on The Name of the Game. Decisions! Decisions! (1971) was a TV movie St. John did with Bob Newhart and Jean Simmons.

St. John achieved her biggest success starring as diamond smuggler Tiffany Case, the love interest of James Bond in Diamonds Are Forever (1971), opposite Sean Connery. She was the first American to play a Bond girl. The character Tiffany is argumentative, abrasive, loud, and brash when compared to previous Bond girls who were more demure; film scholars have inferred that she is meant to be a stereotypical commentary on American women. In a 2015 poll conducted by Moviefone, St. John ranked #9 in The 25 Best Bond Girls for her portrayal of Tiffany, and in 2023, Men's Journal named her 11th on their list of Best Bond Girls of All Time.

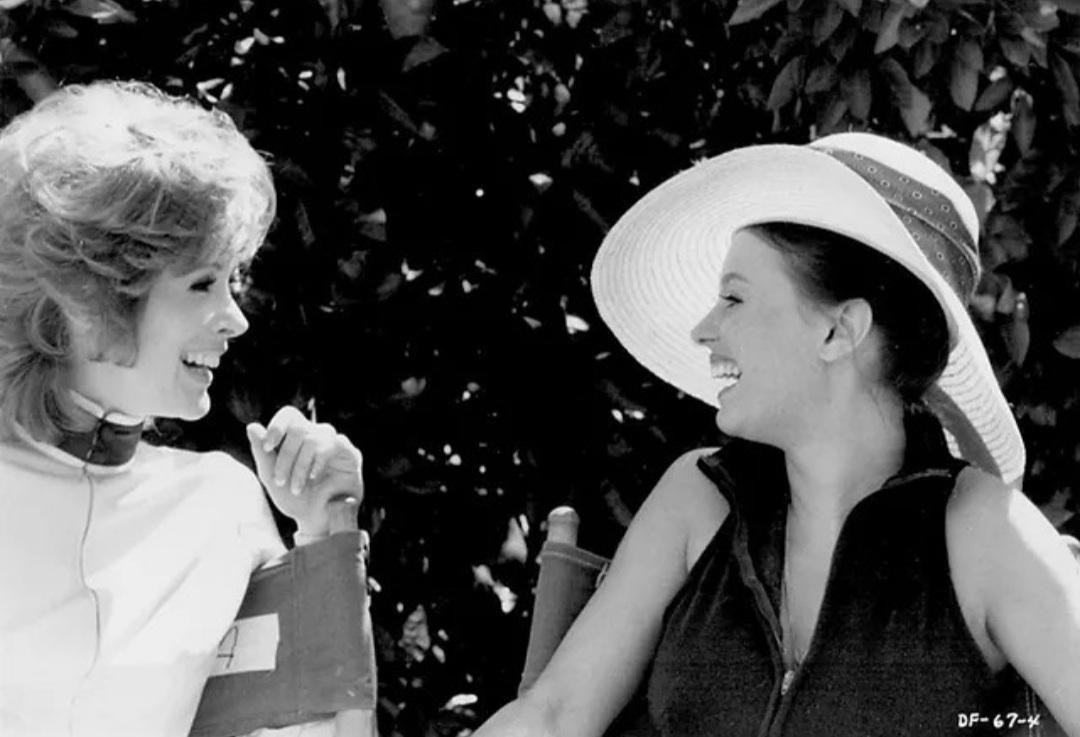
With Lana Wood on the set of Diamonds Are Forever (1971)

In 1972, St. John appeared alongside Oliver Reed in the British crime drama Sitting Target. After the shoot wrapped, she took a break from her career. She later explained that "two pictures in a row was exhausting... I decided I needed a new way of life." Nonetheless, she recalled that Diamonds Are Forever was the most fun she had ever had on a movie.

St. John did the TV movies Saga of Sonora (1973) and Brenda Starr (1976)—playing the title role—and guest-starred on Vega$, The Love Boat, Magnum, P.I., Fantasy Island, and Matt Houston. She also appeared in the pilot of Hart to Hart. She was cast as the princess in Day of the Assassin (1979), but bowed out when her deposit failed to arrive on time; Susana Dosamantes replaced her.

In 1981, following a decade-long sabbatical in Aspen, Colorado, St. John made Hollywood her primary residence again. "I really don't have to work," she said of her return. "But you know what? I got bored." She did the TV movies Two Guys from Muck (1982) and Rooster (1982) and was top-billed in the feature The Concrete Jungle (1982), a woman in prison film in which she played Warden Fletcher. She had a small role in The Act (1983).

During 1983–1984, she starred with Dennis Weaver on the short-lived soap opera Emerald Point N.A.S., in which she played Deanna Kinkaid, Thomas Mallory's conniving former sister-in-law. It also starred another former Bond girl, Maud Adams. St. John was to appear in the pilot for Lime Street (1985) but when it was reduced from two hours to 90 minutes, her scenes ended up on the cutting room floor.

St. John's output decreased significantly after she and Wagner finally married. She appeared with him in Around the World in 80 Days (1989), Something to Believe In (1998), and The Calling (2002). They made brief cameo appearances as themselves in Robert Altman's Hollywood satire The Player (1992). Between 1996 and 2004, the couple performed together on stage in a national touring production of Love Letters. They also appeared on the television sitcom Seinfeld in 1997, playing the parents of Mickey Abbott (Danny Woodburn) in "The Yada Yada" episode.

St. John appeared without Wagner in Out There (1995) and The Trip (2002).

In 2014, St. John played Mrs. Claus in the TV movie Northpole alongside Wagner, who played the part of Santa Claus. The film marked her first acting role after a 12-year absence from the screen. She has since officially retired from acting, but remains involved in civic activities.

== Avocations ==
In 1972, St. John largely left Hollywood behind and moved to Aspen, where she focused on personal interests and cooking. She is among the celebrities credited with increasing the popularity of the town along with Goldie Hawn and Jack Nicholson.

Her interest in cooking eventually led to her becoming a culinary personality, appearing in monthly cooking segments on ABC-TV's Good Morning America and her writing a column in USA Weekend magazine through the 1980s. This culminated in authoring The Jill St. John Cookbook (1987), a healthy, but not health food, collection of recipes and some anecdotes.

St. John also developed a handmade Angora sweater business, and became interested in orchid growing, skiing, hiking, river rafting, camping, and gardening. In 1987, she said "I'm a mountain gal now. I love the outdoors and I love harvesting and using fresh vegetables and herbs."

A 2005 skiing accident forced her to give up the sport and curtailed her dream of becoming "the oldest woman on the ski lift."

== Charity work ==
During the Vietnam War, St. John entertained American soldiers at United Service Organizations (USO) shows. She served as chairwoman for National Outdoor Safety Month in May 1978. She is founder of the Aunts Club, a Rancho Mirage-based group of women who contribute at least $1,000 per year to provide financial support for a child. In 2015, she and her husband auctioned off a private lunch to raise money for Aspen Film. St. John has also made donations to Aspen Community Foundation, and is a longtime board member of Friends of Aspen Fire as well as the Starwood Metropolitan Board.

== Politics ==
St. John ran unsuccessfully in 2023 for a seat on the board of the Aspen Fire Department.

According to an account of a 1972 party organized to support Republican Richard Nixon's re-election campaign, St. John declared that after three years, Henry Kissinger had convinced her to vote for Nixon, though she had earlier supported Democrat Eugene McCarthy in his 1968 challenge to incumbent president Lyndon B. Johnson.

== Personal life ==
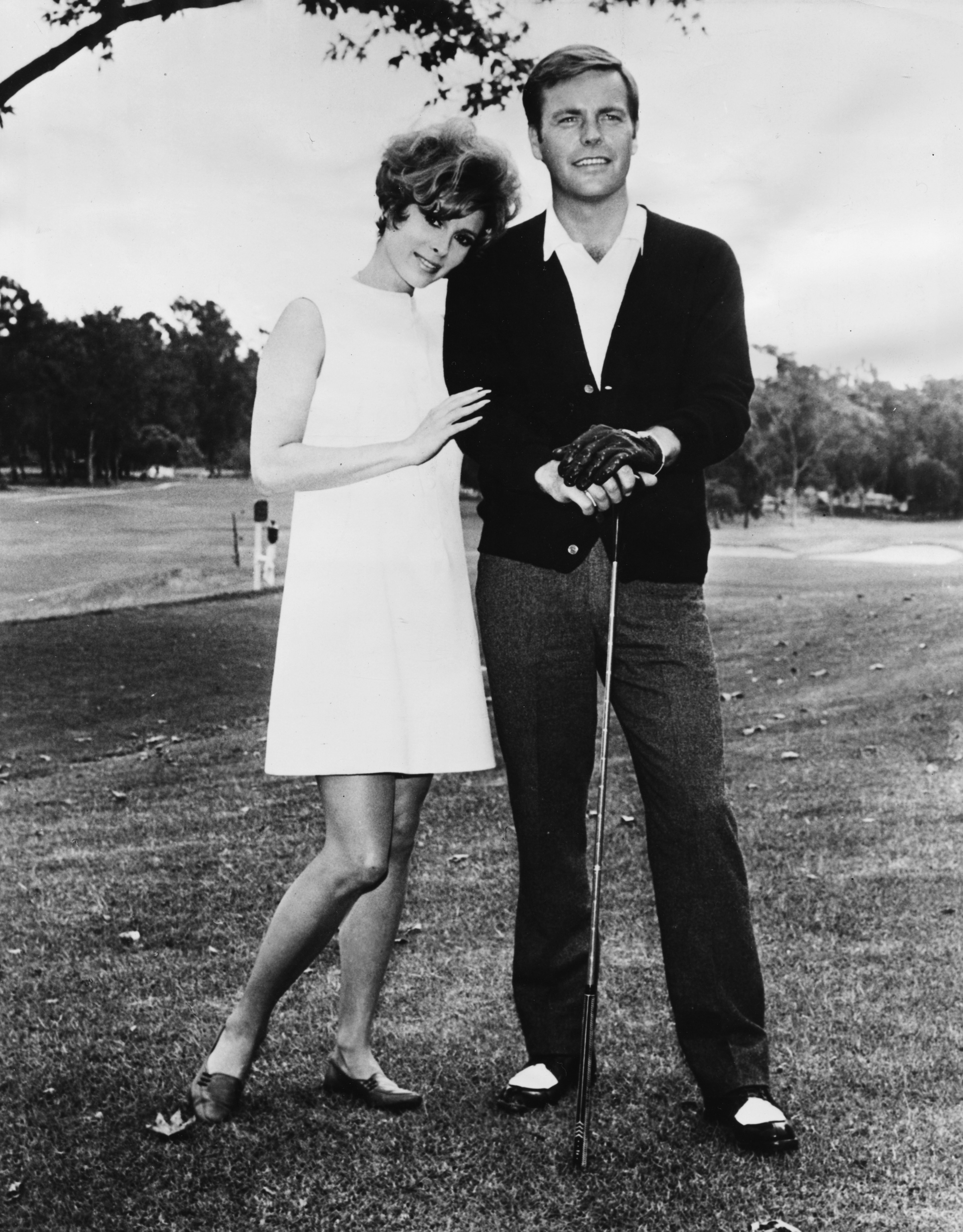
St. John and Wagner in Banning (1967)

St. John has been married four times. Her husbands:

- Neil Dubin (May 12, 1957 – July 3, 1958; divorced) St. John was 16 years old when they eloped to Yuma, Arizona. (Note: Because St. John was a minor, concern arose whether the Arizona ceremony was legal. To ensure the validity of the marriage, Dubin's parents insisted on a Los Angeles wedding, which took place 11 days after they eloped, on May 23.) Dubin was heir to a linen fortune. St. John complained that he harassed and ridiculed her.
- Lance Reventlow (March 24, 1960 – October 30, 1963; divorced) Reventlow was the son of Barbara Hutton, heir to the F. W. Woolworth fortune. St. John received a settlement of $86,000. Despite their divorce and subsequent remarriages, she refers to Reventlow as "my late husband" in interviews.
- Jack Jones (October 14, 1967 – February 28, 1969; divorced) Jones said demands on his singing career and the traveling involved contributed to the breakup.
- Robert Wagner (May 26, 1990 – present) The couple met in 1959 when they were contract players at 20th Century Fox, and have been together since Valentine's Day 1982. (Note: Author Marti Rulli claims Wagner and St. John were seeing each other "within two weeks" of Natalie Wood's November 29, 1981 drowning. Lawyer Sam Perroni unearthed evidence that they may have been involved as early as October of that year.)

Between marriages, St. John dated entertainment, sports, and political personalities including David Bailey, Gianni Bulgari, Sammy Cahn, Michael Caine, Oleg Cassini, Barry Coe, Sean Connery, Robert Evans, Glenn Ford, David Frost, Jack Haley Jr., Bill Hudson, Henry Kissinger, Sidney Korshak, Peter Lawford, George Lazenby, Jim Lonborg, Trini López, Tom Mankiewicz, George Montgomery, Joe Namath, Jack Nicholson, Hugh O'Brian, Ogden Mills Phipps, Roman Polanski, Alejandro Rey, Tom Selleck, Frank Sinatra, Robert Vaughn, Giovanni Volpi, Adam West and David L. Wolper.

St. John gained a reputation for sugar dating in 1966, when garment manufacturer Henry Rosenfeld sued the actress to retrieve $25,800 he loaned her the previous year. St. John contended the money was a gift, but lost the case and had to repay with 5.75% interest. She has also been romantically linked to criminal court judge Jerome M. Becker, ski instructor Ricky Head, Olympic ski champion Brownie Barnes, plastic surgeon Steven Zax, investment broker Lenny Ross, Chicago businessman Delbert W. Coleman, Brazilian entrepreneur Francisco 'Baby' Pignatari and Massachusetts Justice of the Peace Philip L. Robo. She was engaged to Miami real estate developer Robert Blum in 1974, but called off the engagement.

She has three stepdaughters:

- Katie Wagner, born 1964 to Wagner and Marion Marshall
- Natasha Gregson, born 1970 to Richard Gregson and Natalie Wood, but raised in the Wagner/St. John household after Wood died
- Courtney Wagner, born 1974 to Wagner and Wood

In 2007, Wagner and St. John sold the Brentwood ranchette they'd lived on since 1983 for a reported $14 million and relocated full-time to Aspen.

Mutual animosity between St. John and her husband's former sister-in-law, Lana Wood, extends back to 1971, when Sean Connery was simultaneously involved with both women during the filming of Diamonds Are Forever. The half-century feud has been highlighted by two well-documented public altercations: one in 1999, in which St. John refused to be photographed with Wood at a Bond girl reunion for Vanity Fair magazine, and another in 2016 when Wood crashed an event honoring St. John in Palm Springs to confront Wagner over the reopened homicide case of her sister Natalie, who drowned in 1981 while yachting with Wagner off the coast of Santa Catalina Island.

St. John has said she will not write an autobiography, stating emphatically, "The only books I write are cookbooks."

== Filmography ==
Year	Title	Role	Notes
1948	Sandy Dreams		Series regular
1949	The Christmas Carol	Missie Cratchit	Teleplay
1950	Fantastick Studios, Ink		Series regular
1951	Thunder in the East	English girl	Uncredited
1951–1952	The George Burns and Gracie Allen Show	Sherry Kelly / Jill Kelly	3 episodes
1952	Sky King	Gretchen Gluckman	Episode: "Two-Gun Penny"
1953	Fireside Theatre		Episode: "His Name Is Jason"
1954	Cavalcade of America		Episode: "Night Call"
1957	The Christophers		Episode: "Gentle Warrior"
1957	Schlitz Playhouse	Eloise	Episode: "No Second Helping"
1957	The DuPont Show of the Month	Lois Graves	Episode: "Junior Miss"
1958	Summer Love	Erica Landis	
1959	The Remarkable Mr. Pennypacker	Kate Pennypacker	
1959	Holiday for Lovers	Meg Dean	
1960	The Lost World	Jennifer Holmes	
1961	The Roman Spring of Mrs. Stone	Barbara Bingham	
1962	Tender Is the Night	Rosemary Hoyt	
1963	Come Blow Your Horn	Peggy John	Nominated—Golden Globe Award for Best Actress – Motion Picture Musical or Comedy
1963	Who's Minding the Store?	Barbara Tuttle	
1963	Who's Been Sleeping in My Bed?	Toby Tobler	
1963–1965	Bob Hope Presents the Chrysler Theatre	Janie Douglas / Faith / Bunky	3 episodes
1964	Honeymoon Hotel	Sherry Nugent	
1964	Mr. Broadway	Herself	Episode: "Take a Walk Through a Cemetery"
1964	Burke's Law	Pinky Likewise	Episode: "Who Killed Merlin the Great?"
1965	The Rogues	Jena Tate	Episode: "The Pigeons of Paris"
1965	The Liquidator	Iris MacIntosh	
1966	Batman	Molly	Episodes: "Hi Diddle Riddle" and "Smack in the Middle"
1966	The Big Valley	Barbary Red	Episode: "Barbary Red"
1966	The Oscar	Laurel Scott	
1966	Fame Is the Name of the Game	Leona Purdy	TV movie
1967	How I Spent My Summer Vacation	Nikki Pine	TV movie
1967	Eight on the Lam	Monica	
1967	Banning	Angela Barr	
1967	The King's Pirate	Mistress Jessica Stephens	
1967	Tony Rome	Ann Archer	
1968–1972	Rowan & Martin's Laugh-In		8 episodes
1969	The Spy Killer	Mary Harper	TV movie
1969	The Name of the Game	Michelle Howell	Episode: "The Civilized Men"
1970	Foreign Exchange	Mary Harper	TV movie
1971	The Red Skelton Hour	Freida	Episode: "Humperdoo's Little Prescription"
1971	Decisions! Decisions!	Andrea Winters	TV movie
1971	Diamonds Are Forever	Tiffany Case	
1972	Sitting Target	Pat Lomart	
1973	Old Faithful	Miss Roberts	TV movie
1973	Saga of Sonora	Molly	TV movie
1976	Brenda Starr	Brenda Starr	TV movie
1977	Telethon	Fran Sullivan	TV movie
1979	Hart to Hart	Sylvia Maxwell	Pilot
1979–1982	The Love Boat	Laura / Sandy Wilson / Claire Dalrymple / Mitzi De Risi	4 episodes
1980	Vega$	Mavis Graham	Episode: "Sudden Death"
1981–1982	Fantasy Island	Ellen Layton / Jane Doe / Helen of Troy	Episodes: "Paquito's Birthday/Technical Advisor" and "Forget Me Not/The Quiz Masters"
1982	Magnum, P.I.	Jan Kona	Episode: "Three Minus Two"
1982	Two Guys from Muck	Miss Demandt	TV movie
1982	Rooster	Joanna Van Eegan	TV movie
1982	Matt Houston	Karen Ann Douglas	Episode: "X-22"
1982	The Concrete Jungle	Warden Fletcher	
1983	The Act	Elise	
1983–1984	Emerald Point N.A.S.	Deanna Kincaid	Series regular
1986	Dempsey and Makepeace	Mara Giardino	Episodes: "The Burning" and "The Burning: Part 2"
1988	J.J. Starbuck	Rachel Capstone	Episode: "A Song from the Sequel"
1989	Around the World in 80 Days	Woman mistaken for Princess Aouda	Miniseries
1992	The Player	Herself	Cameo
1995	Out There	Bunny Wells	TV movie
1997	Seinfeld	Mrs. Abbott	Episode: "The Yada Yada"
1998	Something to Believe In	Dr. Joanne Anderson	
2002	The Trip	Mary Oakley	
2002	The Calling	Elegant Lady	
2014	Northpole	Mrs. Claus	TV movie

== Documentaries ==
Year	Title	Role
2002	Bond Girls Are Forever	Herself
2020	Natalie Wood: What Remains Behind	Herself

== Stage ==
Year	Title	Role	Venue(s)	Ref(s)
1946	The Conspiracy		Geller Theatre Workshop	
1946	The Booby Prize		Geller Theatre Workshop	
1951	Annie Get Your Gun	Minnie	Greek Theatre	
1996–2004	Love Letters	Melissa Gardner	National tour	

== Radio ==
Year	Title	Role	Network	Ref(s)
1946	Red Ryder		NBC	
1949	Dr. Christian		CBS	
1949	The Rosary Hour	Jacinta	KFWB	
1950	One Man's Family	Sharon Ann	NBC	
1950	The Joyful Hour	The Innkeeper's Daughter	KTSL	
1950	The Christmas Carol	Missie Cratchit	KNHB	
1951	A Quiet Evening at Home	Donna	KNX	
1951	Maggie	Maggie Wolfe	KNX	
1951	Mr. Know-How	Jackie	KNX	
1953	Two Tickets to Stockholm		KHJ	
1953	Just for You	Babs Blake	KNX	
1953	Cry to the World		KNX	
1953	The Wise Guy	Pam	KHJ	

== Discography ==
Year	Title	Label	Catalog number
1965	Bob Hope on the Road to Vietnam	Cadet Records	LP-4046
