= The Starlet =

American reality television program

- Created by: Jamie Kennedy
- Presented by: Katie Wagner
- Judges: Faye Dunaway; Vivica A. Fox; Joseph Middleton
- No. of seasons: 1
- No. of episodes: 6

Original release
- Network: The WB
- Release: March 6 – April 5, 2005

The Starlet is a reality television program on The WB that premiered on March 6, 2005.

Ten young actresses lived together in a home formerly owned by Marilyn Monroe, while competing in a series of acting challenges for the chance to win a role on the WB drama One Tree Hill and a management contract with 3 Arts Entertainment.

Hosted by Katie Wagner, the girls were judged by a panel composed of actresses Faye Dunaway, and Vivica A. Fox, along with casting director Joseph Middleton. The show was a creation of Jamie Kennedy. Jaime Pressly, Days of Our Lives's Matt Cedeño, David Gallagher and Adam LaVorgna from The WB's 7th Heaven also made guest appearances. The eventual winner was 18-year-old Michelynne McGuire, with Mercedes Connor as the runner up.

The Starlet was cancelled on April 5, 2005, after the single season of six episodes.

== Contestants (in reverse order of elimination) ==
Contestant
Michelynne McGuire
Mercedes Connor
Katie Kneeland
Cecile Raubenheimer
Lauren Alonzo
Donna Janelle
Neva Massey
Courtney Ell
Andie Bolt
Andria Mullins
