= Brenda Starr (1976 film) =

- Genre: Adventure
- Written by: George Kirgo
- Directed by: Mel Stuart
- Starring: Jill St. John; Jed Allen; Sorrell Booke; Victor Buono
- Music by: Lalo Schifrin
- Country of origin: United States
- Original language: English

Production
- Executive producer: Paul Mason
- Producer: Bob Larson
- Production location: Torrance, California
- Cinematography: Ted Voigtlander
- Editors: James T. Heckert; Jack Kampschroer
- Running time: 90 minutes
- Production company: David L. Wolper Productions

Original release
- Network: ABC
- Release: May 8, 1976

Brenda Starr is a 1976 American television movie based on Dale Messick's comic strip Brenda Starr, Reporter, starring Jill St. John in the title role. It was directed by Mel Stuart, and it aired on ABC on May 8, 1976.

== Cast ==
- Jill St. John as Brenda Starr
- Jed Allen as Roger Randall
- Sorrell Booke as A J Livwright
- Tabi Cooper as Hank O'Hare
- Victor Buono as Lance O'Toole
- Joel Fabiani as Carlos Vegas
- Barbara Luna as Luisa Santamaria
- Marcia Strassman as Kentucky Smith
- Torin Thatcher as Lassiter
- Arthur Roberts a Dax Leander
- Roy Applegate as Tommy

== Production ==
Jill St John told her press agent that she had a dream to play Brenda Starr. The agent optioned the rights and had a script written. The movie was shot as a pilot for a series but fell flat as a stand-alone project.
