= Decisions! Decisions! =

- Genre: Comedy; Drama
- Written by: Larry Markes; Martin Ragaway
- Directed by: Alex Segal
- Starring: Bob Newhart; Jean Simmons; Jill St. John; Lou Jacobi
- Country of origin: United States
- Original language: English

Production
- Producers: Alex Segal; Herbert L. Strock
- Running time: 110 minutes
- Production companies: Motion-Roman Productions; NBC Productions; Patrick Enterprises

Original release
- Network: NBC
- Release: September 11, 1971

Decisions! Decisions! is a 1971 American made-for-television comedy-drama film starring Bob Newhart, Jean Simmons and Jill St. John.

The film was part of a two-picture deal between Bob Newhart and NBC. It was filmed as two one-hour shots and put together and screened as one film which originally aired on NBC on September 11, 1971.

== Plot ==
The misadventures of a salesman and a sexologist featuring two plot outlines introduced to a studio audience, who then votes to determine which should be developed.

== Cast ==
- Bob Newhart as John Hobson
- Jean Simmons as Phoebe Masterson
- Jill St. John as Andrea Winters
- Lou Jacobi as Lt. Ettinger
- John Carradine as Railroad Ticket Clerk
- Royal Dano as Tex
