= Robert Wagner =

American actor (born 1930)

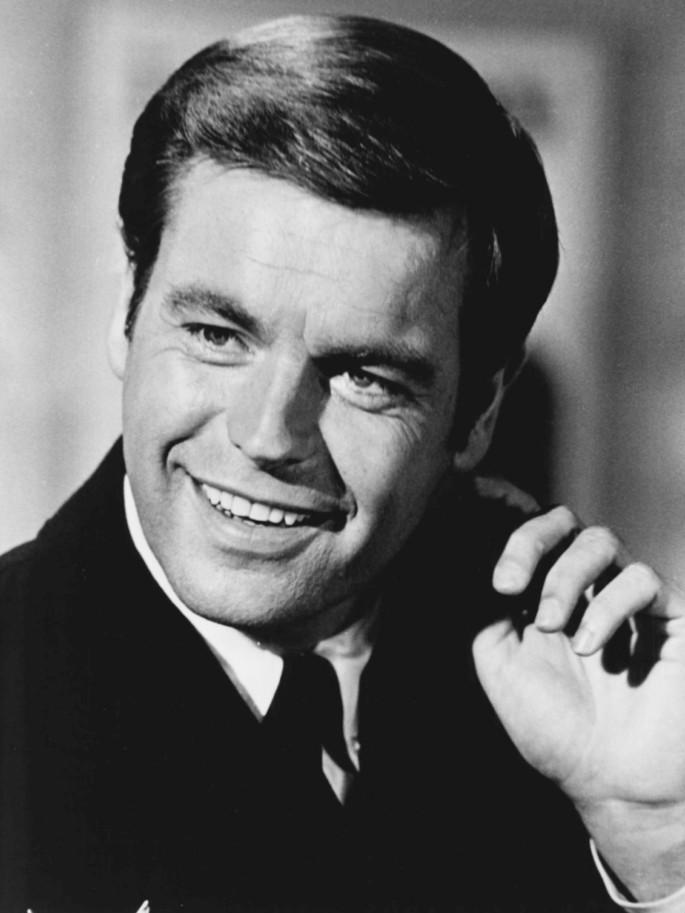
- Wagner in 1967
- Born: Robert John Wagner Jr. February 10, 1930 (age 96); Detroit, Michigan, U.S.
- Occupation: Actor
- Years active: 1950–present
- Spouses: Natalie Wood (m. 1957; div. 1962) (m. 1972; died 1981); Marion Marshall (m. 1963; div. 1971); Jill St. John (m. 1990)
- Children: 2, including Katie
- Relatives: Lana Wood (sister-in-law); Natasha Gregson Wagner (stepdaughter); Barry Watson (stepson-in-law)

Robert John Wagner Jr. (born February 10, 1930) is an American actor. He is known for starring in the television shows It Takes a Thief (1968–1970), Switch (1975–1978), and Hart to Hart (1979–1984). He later had recurring roles on Two and a Half Men (2007–2008) and NCIS (2010–2019).

In films, Wagner is known for his role as Number 2 in the Austin Powers trilogy of films (1997, 1999, 2002), as well as for Prince Valiant (1954), A Kiss Before Dying (1956), The Pink Panther (1963), Harper (1966), The Towering Inferno (1974), and The Concorde... Airport '79 (1979).

Wagner's first wife, actress Natalie Wood, died under mysterious circumstances in 1981. In 2018, the Los Angeles County Sheriff's Department named Wagner a "person of interest" in the investigation into Wood's death. Wagner has denied any involvement.

== Early life ==
Wagner was born in Detroit, to Thelma Hazel Alvera (née Boe; 1898–1993), a former telephone operator, and Robert John Wagner Sr. (1890–1964), a traveling salesman who worked for the Ford Motor Company. He had one older sister, Mary Scott (1926–2023).

Wagner's mother came from La Crosse, Wisconsin. Her parents were both immigrants from Norway, who married in La Crosse in 1887. Wagner's father was a native of Kalamazoo, Michigan. His parents were from Germany.

The family moved to Bel-Air, an upscale area of Los Angeles, in 1937.

== Career ==
=== 20th Century Fox and Columbia Pictures ===
After an unsuccessful screen test directed by Fred Zinnemann for his film Teresa (1951), Wagner was represented by Albert R. Broccoli. He made his uncredited film debut in The Happy Years (1950), was signed by agent Henry Willson and put under contract with 20th Century Fox.

"I started off as an ingénue", he said. "I was 19 years old. I was the boy next door. But you always felt you could work your way up, that you could have a better part in the next picture. [Head of Fox] Darryl Zanuck was always placing me in different positions."

Wagner's first film for Fox was Halls of Montezuma (1951), a World War II film. Wagner had a supporting role, with Richard Widmark as the star. The studio then had him perform a similar function in another war movie, The Frogmen (1951), again with Widmark; the cast also included another young male under contract to the studio, Jeffrey Hunter, with whom Wagner would often work. Let's Make It Legal (1951) was a comedy where Wagner again supported an older star, in this case Claudette Colbert.

Wagner first gained significant attention with a small, showy part as a shell-shocked soldier in With a Song in My Heart (1952).

"You were part of 20th Century Fox", he said. "You felt proud of being part of the organization. When I wasn't working, I was on the road, going out and selling movies or dancing on the stage and meeting the public. They never let you rest."

Fox started to give Wagner better roles. He was the romantic male lead in Stars and Stripes Forever (1952), a biopic about John Philip Sousa starring Clifton Webb. He supported James Cagney and Dan Dailey in John Ford's version of What Price Glory (1952) and supported Webb again in Titanic (1953). He was in a minor Western, The Silver Whip (1953) with Rory Calhoun.

==== Leading man ====
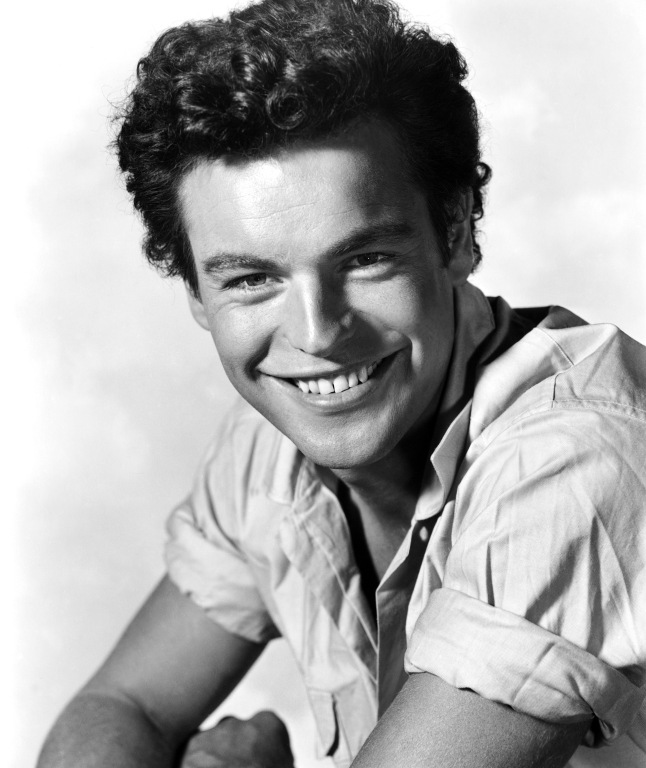
Wagner in Beneath the 12-Mile Reef (1953)

Fox gave Wagner his first starring role in Beneath the 12-Mile Reef (1953). Reviews were poor but the movie was only the third ever to be shot in CinemaScope and was a big hit.

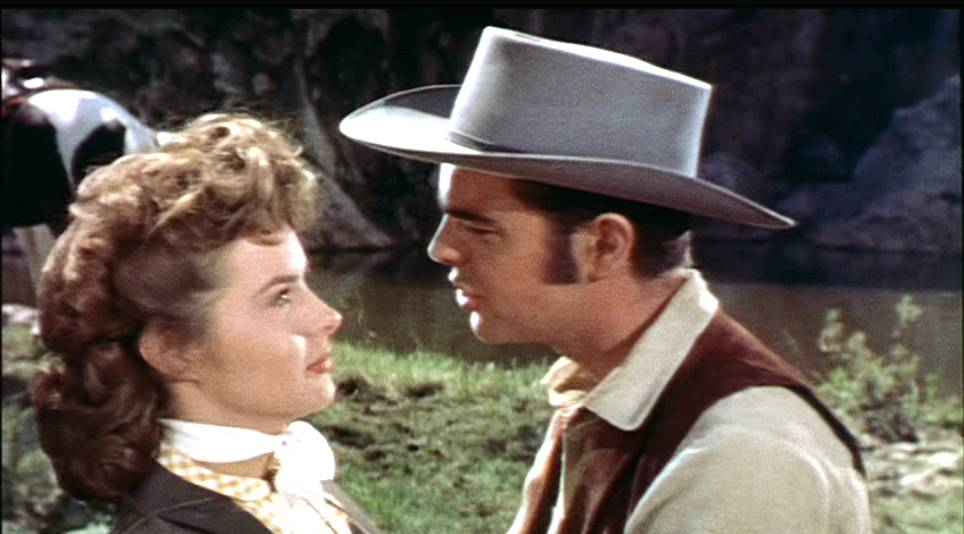
Jean Peters with Wagner in Broken Lance (1954)

Also popular was a Western, Broken Lance (1954), where Wagner supported Spencer Tracy for director Edward Dmytryk, appearing as Tracy's son. Fox gave Wagner the lead in an expensive spectacular, Prince Valiant (1954). While popular, critical reception was poor and Wagner later joked his wig in the movie made him look like Jane Wyman. He was teamed with Jeffrey Hunter in a Western, White Feather (1955).

Wagner was borrowed by Paramount for The Mountain (1956), directed by Dmytryk, where Wagner was cast as Spencer Tracy's brother, having played his son just two years earlier in the same director's Broken Lance. He received more critical acclaim for the lead in A Kiss Before Dying (1956), from the novel by Ira Levin; it was made for Crown Productions, a company of Darryl F. Zanuck's brother in law (the leads were all under contract to Fox) and released through United Artists.

Back at Fox Wagner was in Between Heaven and Hell (1956), a war movie, and The True Story of Jesse James (1957), playing the leading role for director Nicholas Ray (Jeffrey Hunter was Frank). Both movies were box office disappointments and it seemed Wagner was unable to make the transition to top-level star. This appeared confirmed when he was the lead in Stopover Tokyo (1957). In 1959, Wagner said:

When I started at Fox in 1950 they were making sixty-five pictures a year. Now they're lucky if they make thirty. There was a chance to get some training in B pictures. Then TV struck. Everything went big and they started sticking me into Cinemascope spectacles. One day, smiling Joe Juvenile with no talent was doing a role intended for John Wayne. That was in a dog called Stopover Tokyo. I've really had to work to keep up.

Wagner supported Robert Mitchum in a Korean War movie, The Hunters (1958), and appeared with a number of Fox contractees in a World War II drama, In Love and War (1958).

After a cameo in Mardi Gras (1958), Wagner supported Bing Crosby and Debbie Reynolds in Say One for Me (1959).

Trying to kick-start his career, Wagner appeared with his then-wife Natalie Wood in All the Fine Young Cannibals (1960), made for MGM.

In January 1961, Wagner and Wood formed their own company, Rona Productions, named after the first two letters of both their first names. Rona signed a three-picture deal with Columbia pictures for Wagner's services, which was to start with Sail a Crooked Ship (1961) and The Interns. He also had a deal to make one more film at Fox, which was to be Solo, the story of a jazz drummer directed by Dick Powell, or The Comancheros with Gary Cooper.

Wagner made Sail a Crooked Ship but his part in The Interns went to James MacArthur. Solo was never made, and The Comancheros was made instead with John Wayne and Stuart Whitman. Wagner did make The War Lover (1962) with Steve McQueen, which was filmed in England.

=== Europe ===
Wagner's first marriage to Wood had broken up, and he relocated to Europe. He had a small role in The Longest Day (1962), produced by Daryl Zanuck for Fox. He had a larger part in The Condemned of Altona (1962), a commercial and critical disappointment despite being directed by Vittorio de Sica and co-starring Sophia Loren.

Considerably more popular was The Pink Panther (1963), a massive hit, although Wagner's part was very much in support to those of David Niven, Capucine, Peter Sellers, and Claudia Cardinale. It was directed by Blake Edwards, who wanted Wagner for the lead in The Great Race (1965), but Jack L. Warner overruled him.

=== Return to Hollywood and Universal Pictures ===
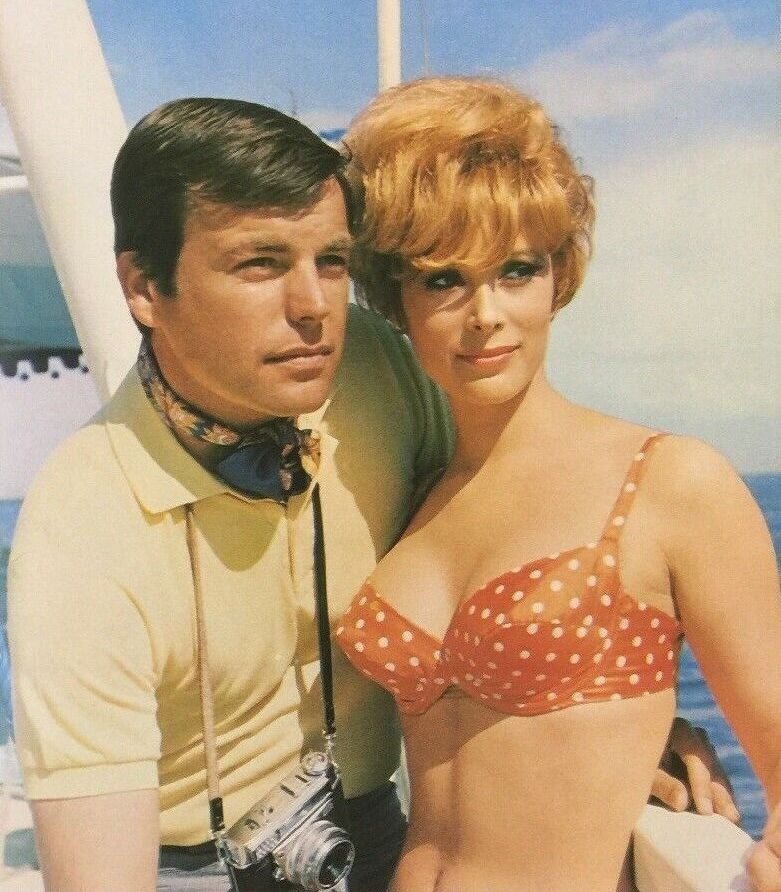
With Jill St. John in How I Spent My Summer Vacation (1967)

On Wagner's return to America he started playing in a theatre for the first time with the lead role in Mister Roberts for one week at a holiday resort just outside Chicago. The disciplines of the theatre did not interest him and Wagner expressed glee to be back in Hollywood and find a supporting role in the modern-day private investigator hit, Harper (1966), starring Paul Newman.

Wagner signed with Universal Pictures in 1966, starring opposite his future wife Jill St. John in the films How I Spent My Summer Vacation, a made-for-TV movie released in the United Kingdom as Deadly Roulette, and Banning (1967). He returned to Italy to make a caper film with Raquel Welch for MGM, The Biggest Bundle of Them All (1968).

=== Television star ===
In 1967, Lew Wasserman of Universal convinced Wagner to make his television series debut in It Takes a Thief (1968–1970) on ABC-TV. "I was opposed to doing Thief", Wagner said later. "But Lew Wasserman said: 'I want you to be in TV Guide every week. This is your medium, you've got to try it, you'll be great.' Roland Kibbee wrote the part for me, and I would have missed all that if I hadn't listened to Lew."

While the success of The Pink Panther and Harper began Wagner's comeback, the successful two-and-a-half seasons of his first TV series completed it. In this series, he acted with Fred Astaire, who played his father. Wagner was a longtime friend of Astaire, having gone to school with Astaire's eldest son, Peter. Wagner's performance would earn him an Emmy nomination for Best TV Actor.

During the making of the series he made a film for Universal, the comedy Don't Just Stand There! (1968) with Mary Tyler Moore. It was not a success. More popular was Winning (1969), a racing car drama where Wagner supported Paul Newman and Joanne Woodward. He also guest-starred in The Name of the Game (1970).

Wagner's friend and agent Albert Broccoli suggested that he audition to play James Bond, but he decided it was not right for him.

Wagner appeared in the series pilot, City Beneath the Sea (1971), that was not picked up. The following year, he produced and cast himself opposite Bette Davis in the made-for-TV film Madame Sin, which was theatrically released overseas as a feature film.

He was a regular in the BBC/Universal World War II prisoner-of-war drama Colditz (1972–1974) for much of its run. He reunited with McQueen, along with Paul Newman and Faye Dunaway, in the disaster film The Towering Inferno released in the same year. It was a massive hit, although Wagner's part was relatively small.

==== Switch ====
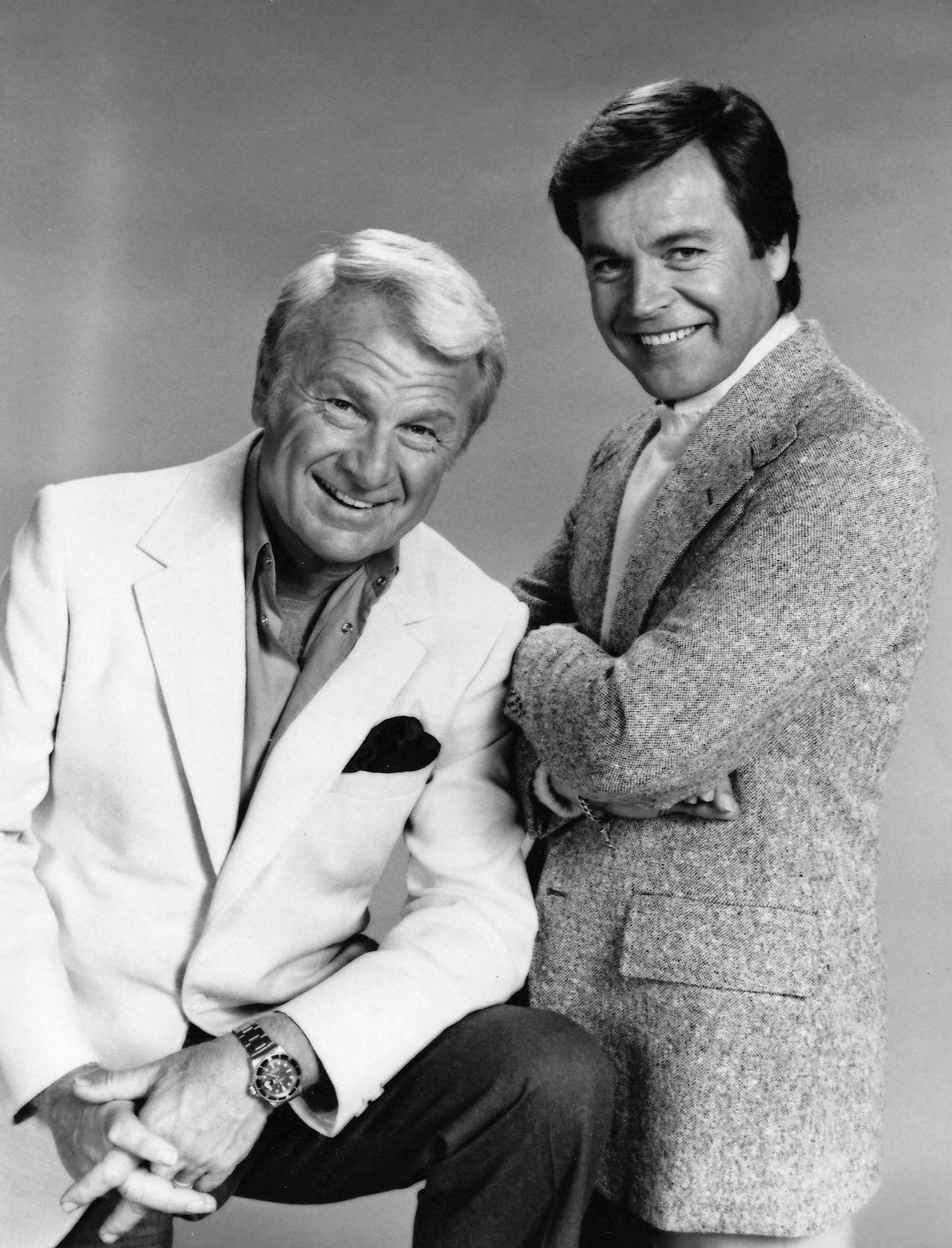
with Eddie Albert in Switch, 1975

By the mid-1970s, Wagner's television career was at its peak with the CBS-TV television series Switch (1975–1978, opposite Eddie Albert, Sharon Gless, and Charlie Callas) after re-signing a contract with Universal in 1974. Albert had been a childhood hero of Wagner's, after he watched the movie Brother Rat, along with a few others. The friendship started in the early 1960s, where he also co-starred in a couple of Albert's movies. After the end of the series, the two remained friends until Albert's death on May 26, 2005. Wagner spoke at his funeral, and gave a testimonial about his longtime friendship with him.

In partial payment for starring together in the Aaron Spelling and Leonard Goldberg production of the TV movie The Affair, Wagner and Natalie Wood were given a share in three TV series that the producers were developing for ABC. Only one reached the screen, the very successful TV series Charlie's Angels, for which Wagner and Wood had a 50% share, though Wagner was to spend many years in court arguing with Spelling and Goldberg over what was defined as profit.

Wagner and Wood acted with Laurence Olivier in Cat on a Hot Tin Roof (1976), as part of Olivier's television series Laurence Olivier Presents for the UK's Granada Television.

Wagner had a small role in some all-star Universal films, Midway (1976) and The Concorde... Airport '79 (1979).

==== Hart to Hart ====
Wagner's most successful series was Hart to Hart, which co-starred Stefanie Powers and Lionel Stander and was broadcast on ABC-TV from 1979 to 1984. No one else was seriously considered for the role. George Hamilton had a high profile at the time and was suggested, but producer Aaron Spelling said that if he was cast "the audience will resent him as Hart for being that rich. But no one will begrudge RJ [Wagner] a nickel."

During the series run, Wagner reprised his old Pink Panther role in Curse of the Pink Panther (1983). He also had a supporting role in I Am the Cheese (1983).

Wagner played an insurance investigator in the short-lived TV series Lime Street (1985).

In 1985, he reflected, "Bad-guy roles work if they're really good parts, but they don't come along very often. I think that what I've been doing has worked for me. Sure I'd like to do a Clint Eastwood, grizzled, down-and-out guy, but there aren't many scripts like that... What has been projected for me is an international quality that can take me anywhere and get me into all kind of involvements; to do otherwise would mean a character role."

=== Later career ===
Wagner appeared in a TV movie with Audrey Hepburn, Love Among Thieves (1987) and in a miniseries with Jaclyn Smith, Windmills of the Gods (1988). He and St. John worked with Pierce Brosnan in the miniseries remake of Around the World in 80 Days (1989). For Tom Mankiewicz, he played a supporting part in Delirious (1991). More widely seen was Dragon: The Bruce Lee Story (1993), where Wagner played a producer. Wagner played Love Letters on stage with Stefanie Powers. They also reprised their Hart characters in a series of TV movies.

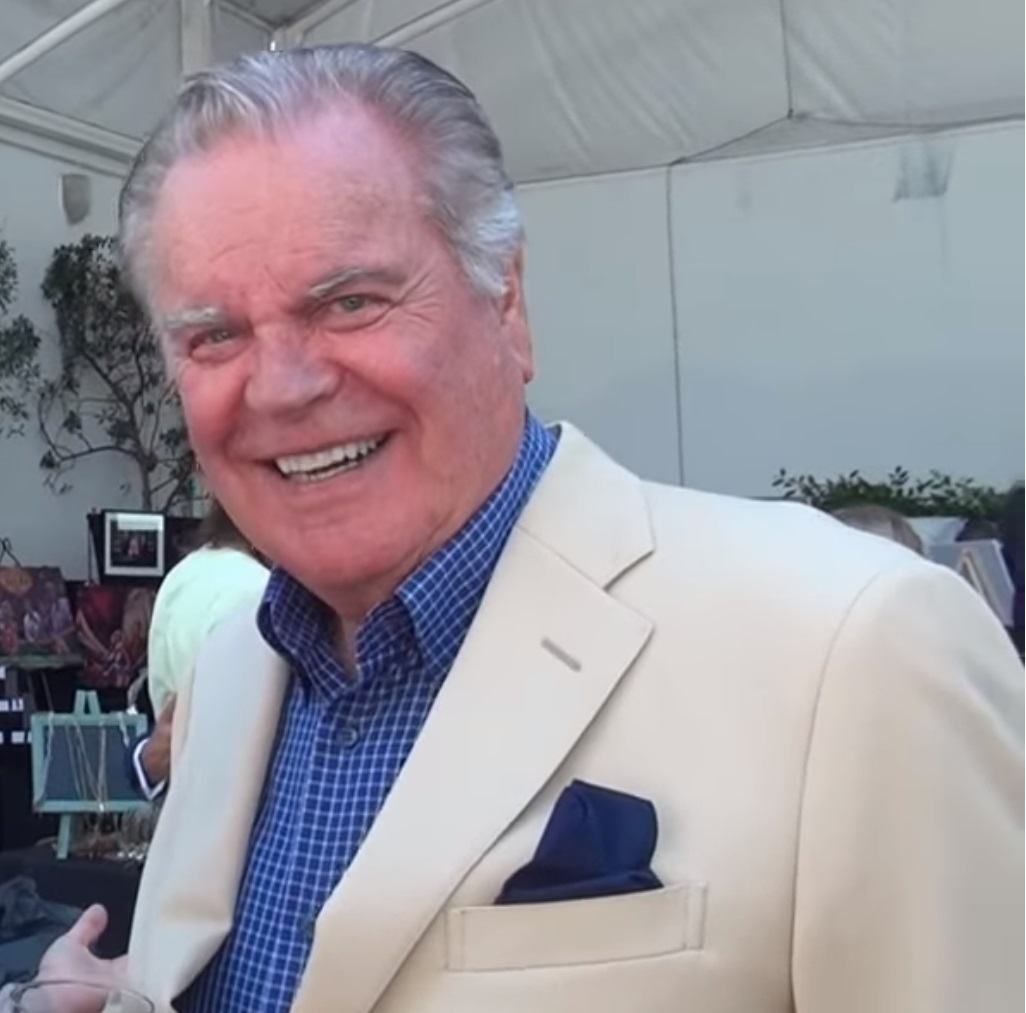
Wagner in 2013

Wagner's film career received a boost after his role in the Austin Powers series of spy spoofs starring Mike Myers. Wagner played Dr. Evil's henchman Number 2 in all three films: Austin Powers: International Man of Mystery (1997), Austin Powers: The Spy Who Shagged Me (1999) and Austin Powers in Goldmember (2002). He also had small roles in Wild Things (1998), Crazy in Alabama (1999), Play It to the Bone (2000), Becoming Dick (2001) and Sol Goode (2001).

Wagner hosted Fox Movie Channel's Hour of Stars, featuring original television episodes of The 20th Century Fox Hour (1955), a series in which he had appeared in his early days at the studio. In 2005, he became television spokesman for the Senior Lending Network, a reverse mortgage lender and in 2010 began serving as spokesman for the Guardian First Funding Group, another reverse mortgage lender. In June 2011, Guardian First Funding was acquired by Urban Financial Group, who continued to use Wagner as their spokesperson.

In 2007, Wagner had a role in the BBC/AMC series Hustle. In season four's premiere, Wagner played a crooked Texan being taken for half a million dollars. As Wagner is considered "a suave icon of American caper television, including It Takes a Thief and Hart to Hart", Robert Glenister (Hustle's fixer, Ash Morgan) commented that "to have one of the icons of that period involved is a great bonus for all of us". Wagner also played the pivotal role of President James A. Garfield in the comedy/horror film Netherbeast Incorporated (2007). The role was written with Wagner in mind. He had a recurring role of a rich suitor to the main characters' mother on the sitcom Two and a Half Men. His final appearances on the show were in May 2008.

Wagner has guest-starred in 13 episodes of NCIS as Anthony DiNozzo Sr., the father of Anthony DiNozzo Jr., played by Michael Weatherly. Weatherly had previously appeared as Wagner in the TV movie The Mystery of Natalie Wood.

Wagner was set to star as Charlie in the 2011 remake of Charlie's Angels, but he had to exit the project due to scheduling conflicts.

Despite his apparent feeling of distaste when he was working with Raquel Welch on The Biggest Bundle of Them All, they reunited 50 years later on the 2017 Canadian series Date My Dad.

== Personal life ==
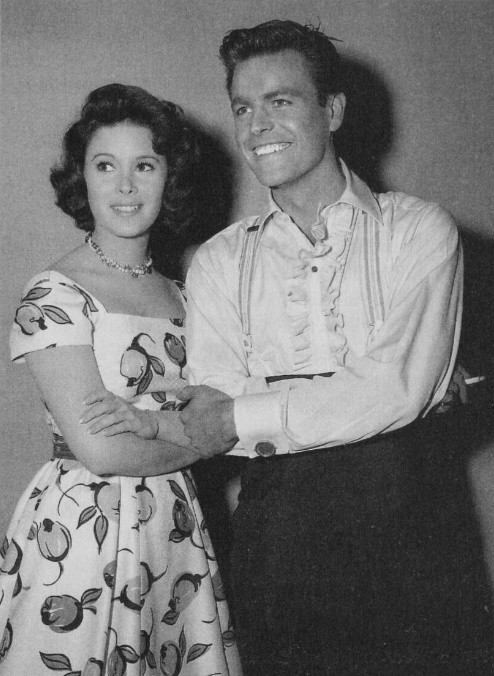
With Jill St. John in 1959

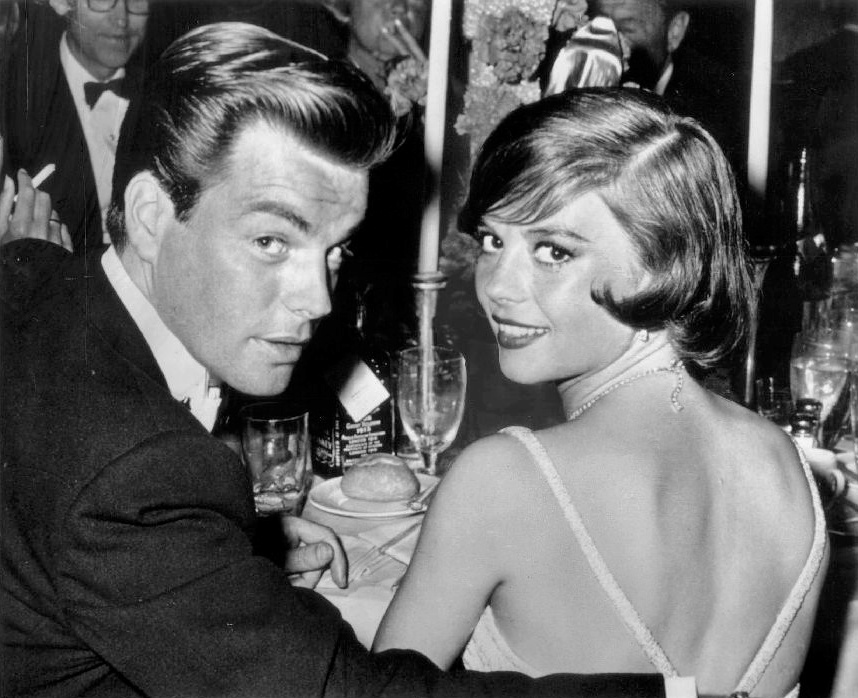
With Natalie Wood in 1960

In his memoirs, Wagner said he had had affairs with Yvonne De Carlo, Joan Crawford, Elizabeth Taylor, Anita Ekberg, Shirley Anne Field, Lori Nelson, and Joan Collins. He also claimed a four-year romantic relationship with Barbara Stanwyck after they acted together in the movie Titanic (1953). According to Wagner, because of their age difference—he was 22, she was 45—they kept the affair secret to avoid damaging their careers.

In 1956, when he was 26 years old, Wagner became involved with 18-year-old actress Natalie Wood. They were married on December 28, 1957, in Scottsdale, Arizona. At some point during the first half of 1961, according to several published accounts, Wood caught him having an extramarital affair with a man in the couple's home. They announced their separation on June 20, 1961 (though Wagner has since stated that they separated in 1960), and divorced on April 27, 1962.

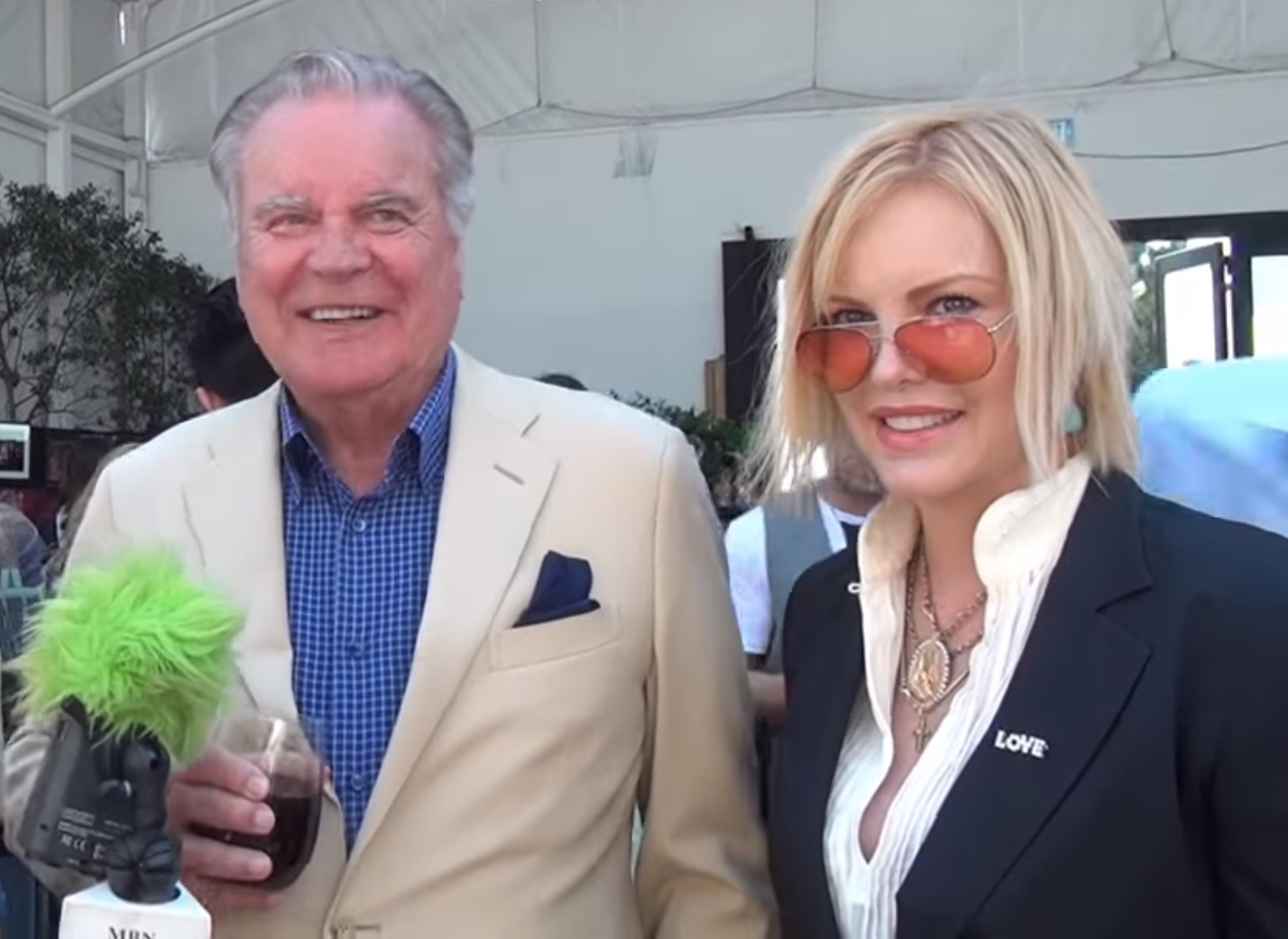
With Katie Wagner in 2013

While working on location in Rome, Wagner reconnected with an old friend, actress Marion Marshall, and moved in with her in November 1961. After a two-year courtship, Wagner, Marshall and her two sons from her marriage to Stanley Donen moved back to America. Wagner and Marshall married on July 21, 1963, at the Bronx Courthouse. They had a daughter, Katie (born May 11, 1964). They separated in June 1970 and divorced on October 14, 1971.

Wagner was engaged to Tina Sinatra from June 1970 until January 1972. Immediately afterwards, Wagner rekindled his romance with Wood. They remarried on July 16 aboard the Ramblin' Rose, anchored off Paradise Cove in Malibu. They had a daughter, Courtney (born March 9, 1974).

Following Wood's death on November 29, 1981, Wagner became the guardian of her then-11-year-old daughter by producer Richard Gregson, Natasha Gregson, although he never legally adopted her. He is completely estranged from his former sister-in-law, Lana Wood, who made claims in 2001 that Wagner was having a homosexual affair; she has since repeatedly doubled down on the claim, despite Wagner's denials. In a 2018 televised interview with Megyn Kelly, when asked if she thinks Wagner "murdered" her sister, Lana said, "Yes."

On Valentine's Day 1982, Wagner began dating actress Jill St. John, whom he had known since the late 1950s. After eight years together, they married on May 26, 1990, in Pacific Palisades and honeymooned on Little Torch Key. The marriage is the fourth for both Wagner and St. John and it has lasted longer than all six of their previous marriages combined. The couple co-starred in six films between 1967 and 2014 as well as "The Yada Yada" episode of Seinfeld in 1997, and also appeared onstage in a touring production of Love Letters (1996–2004).

St. John and Lana Wood both appeared in the 1971 James Bond film Diamonds Are Forever and had already been in a longstanding feud prior to Natalie Wood's death. At a 1999 Bond girl reunion for Vanity Fair magazine, a well-publicized altercation occurred between the two when St. John refused to be photographed with Lana. In 2016, Lana crashed a gala honoring St. John in Palm Springs to confront Wagner—in front of cameramen—over the reopened homicide case of Natalie Wood.

Wagner became a first-time grandfather in 2006 when Katie Wagner, his daughter with Marshall, gave birth to her son Riley John Wagner-Lewis. Riley is Wagner's only grandchild.

In 2007, Wagner and St. John sold the Brentwood ranchette they had lived in since 1983 for a reported $14 million. The couple now resides in Aspen, Colorado, where they built a vacation home in 1995. Wagner and St. John initially retained a condo in Los Angeles, but sold it in 2015.

== Death of Natalie Wood ==
On November 29, 1981, Wood died under mysterious circumstances on or near the 55-foot (17 m) yacht Splendour while moored near Catalina Island. Wood had been on board the Splendour, along with Wagner, Christopher Walken, and Dennis Davern, the vessel's captain. No explanation has been given for the absence of Walken's wife Georgianne. According to Wagner, Wood was not on board when he went to bed, and, according to his spokesman, he thought Wood had taken off on a small inflatable boat by herself, as she had done before. Wood's body was found about a mile from the yacht, with the inflatable boat beached nearby. The autopsy revealed that Wood had 39 fresh bruises on her body, including an abrasion on her left cheek.

Later, in his memoir Pieces of My Heart, Wagner acknowledged having an argument with Wood before she disappeared but had calmed down and gone to bed. The autopsy found that Wood's blood alcohol content was 0.14% and there were traces of two types of medication in her bloodstream: a motion-sickness pill and a painkiller, both of which increase the effects of alcohol. Two witnesses, who had been on another boat nearby, stated they had heard a woman scream for help during the night. Following his investigation, Los Angeles County coroner Thomas Noguchi ruled her death an accident by drowning and hypothermia.

Wagner, Walken, and Davern initially told detectives that Wood left in a dinghy to go ashore; the case was reopened in 2011 after Davern publicly stated that he had lied to police during the initial investigation and that Wood and Wagner had had an argument that evening. He alleged that Wood had been flirting with Walken, that Wagner was jealous and enraged, and that following Wood's disappearance, Wagner prevented Davern turning on the search lights and notifying authorities. Davern claimed Wagner was responsible for Wood's death and that Wagner kept the investigation "low-profile".

In 2012, Los Angeles County Chief Coroner Lakshmanan Sathyavagiswaran amended Wood's death certificate and changed the cause of her death from accidental drowning to "drowning and other undetermined factors". The amended document included a statement that the circumstances of how Wood ended up in the water are "not clearly established." On January 14, 2013, the Los Angeles County coroner's office issued a ten-page addendum to Wood's autopsy report. It stated that she may have sustained some of the bruises on her body before she went into the water and drowned.

On February 1, 2018, the Los Angeles County Sheriff's Department named Wagner a "person of interest" in the investigation into Wood's death. Wagner has denied any involvement in Wood's death. On May 27, 2022, Lieutenant Hugo Reynaga announced that all leads in the case had been exhausted and that the case remained open and unsolved.

== Filmography ==
=== Film ===
| Year | Title | Role | Notes |
|---|---|---|---|
| 1951 | The Frogmen | Lt. (jg) Franklin | |
| 1951 | Halls of Montezuma | Pvt. Coffman | |
| 1951 | Let's Make It Legal | Jerry Denham | |
| 1952 | With a Song in My Heart | GI Paratrooper | |
| 1952 | Stars and Stripes Forever | Willie Little | |
| 1952 | What Price Glory | Private Lewisohn | |
| 1953 | Beneath the 12-Mile Reef | Tony Petrakis | First lead role |
| 1953 | Titanic | Gifford "Giff" Rogers | |
| 1953 | The Silver Whip | Jess Harker | |
| 1954 | Broken Lance | Joe Devereaux | |
| 1954 | Prince Valiant | Prince Valiant | |
| 1955 | White Feather | Josh Tanner | |
| 1956 | A Kiss Before Dying | Bud Corliss | |
| 1956 | Between Heaven and Hell | Sam Gifford | |
| 1956 | The Mountain | Christopher Teller | |
| 1957 | The True Story of Jesse James | Jesse James | |
| 1957 | Stopover Tokyo | Mark Fannon | |
| 1958 | The Hunters | Lt. Pell | |
| 1958 | In Love and War | Frank "Frankie" O'Neill | |
| 1959 | Say One for Me | Tony Vincent | |
| 1960 | All the Fine Young Cannibals | Chad Bixby (based on Chet Baker) | |
| 1961 | Sail a Crooked Ship | Gilbert Barrows | |
| 1962 | The Longest Day | US Army Ranger | |
| 1962 | The War Lover | Lt Ed Boland | |
| 1962 | The Condemned of Altona | Werner von Gerlach | |
| 1963 | The Pink Panther | George Lytton | |
| 1966 | Harper | Allan Taggert | |
| 1967 | Banning | Mike Banning | |
| 1968 | The Biggest Bundle of Them All | Harry Price | |
| 1968 | Don't Just Stand There! | Lawrence Colby | |
| 1969 | Winning | Luther Erding | |
| 1972 | Madame Sin | Anthony Lawrence | was also executive producer |
| 1974 | The Towering Inferno | Dan Bigelow | |
| 1976 | Midway | Lieutenant Commander Ernest L. Blake | |
| 1979 | The Concorde... Airport '79 | Kevin Harrison | |
| 1983 | Curse of the Pink Panther | George Lytton | |
| 1983 | I Am the Cheese | Dr. Brint | |
| 1991 | Delirious | Jack Gates (uncredited) | |
| 1992 | The Player | Himself | |
| 1993 | Dragon: The Bruce Lee Story | Bill Krieger | |
| 1997 | Austin Powers: International Man of Mystery | Number Two | |
| 1998 | Wild Things | Tom Baxter | |
| 1999 | Crazy in Alabama | Harry Hall | |
| 1999 | Austin Powers: The Spy Who Shagged Me | Number Two | |
| 2000 | Play It to the Bone | Hank Goody | |
| 2000 | Becoming Dick | Edward | |
| 2001 | Sol Goode | Sol's Dad | |
| 2002 | Austin Powers in Goldmember | Number Two | |
| 2003 | Hollywood Homicide | Himself | |
| 2004 | El Padrino | Paul Fisch | |
| 2006 | Everyone's Hero | Mr. Robinson | Voice only |
| 2006 | Hoot | Mayor Grandy | |
| 2007 | Netherbeast Incorporated | President James Garfield | |
| 2007 | Man in the Chair | Taylor Moss | |
| 2007 | A Dennis the Menace Christmas | Mr. Wilson | |
| 2009 | The Wild Stallion | Novak | |
| 2012 | Life's a Beach | Tom Wald | |
| 2014 | The Hungover Games | Liam | |
| 2016 | Thirty Nine | Father | |
| 2016 | Lend a Hand for Love | Narrator | Short film |
| 2017 | What Happened to Monday | Charles Benning | |
| 2020 | Jay Sebring....Cutting to the Truth | Self | Documentary |
| 2021 | Space Jam: A New Legacy | Number Two | Archival recording |

=== Television ===
| Year | Title | Role | Notes |
|---|---|---|---|
| 1953 | Juke Box Jury | Himself | Unknown episodes |
| 1957 | The Dinah Shore Chevy Show | Himself | One episode |
| 1963 | The Eleventh Hour | Kenny Walsh | Episode: "And God Created Vanity" |
| 1966 | Bob Hope Presents the Chrysler Theatre | Lt. Commander Nick Raino / Harry Brophy | Episodes: "The Enemy on the Beach" and "Runaway Bay" |
| 1967 | How I Spent My Summer Vacation | Jack Washington | Television movie |
| 1968–1970 | It Takes a Thief | Alexander Mundy | 66 episodes Nominated – Primetime Emmy Award for Outstanding Lead Actor in a Drama Series (1970); Nominated – Golden Globe Award for Best Actor – Television Series Drama (1970) |
| 1970 | The Name of the Game | Nick Freitas | Episode: "The War Merchants" |
| 1970 | The Red Skelton Hour | Colossal Boy | Episode: "The Family Business" |
| 1971 | The Name of the Game | Dave Corey | Episode: "The Man Who Killed a Ghost" |
| 1971 | City Beneath the Sea | Brett Matthews | Television movie |
| 1971 | Crosscurrent / The Cable-Car Murder | Howard McBride | Television movie |
| 1971 | Perlico - Perlaco | Robert Wagner | Television movie |
| 1972 | Killer by Night | Dr. Larry Ross | Television movie |
| 1972 | The Streets of San Francisco | David J. Farr | Episode: "Pilot" |
| 1972–1974 | Colditz | Flight Lieutenant Phil Carrington | 14 episodes |
| 1973 | The Affair | Marcus Simon | ABC Movie of the Week |
| 1975 | The Abduction of Saint Anne | Dave Hatcher | ABC Movie of the Week |
| 1975–1978 | Switch | Pete T. Ryan | 71 episodes |
| 1976 | Death at Love House | Joel Gregory (Jr. & Sr.) | Television movie |
| 1976 | Laurence Olivier Presents | Brick | Episode: "Cat on a Hot Tin Roof" |
| 1977 | The Hardy Boys/Nancy Drew Mysteries | Himself | Episode: "The Mystery of the Hollywood Phantom: Part II" |
| 1978 | The Critical List | Dr. Nick Sloan | Television movie |
| 1978 | Pearl | Capt. Cal Lankford | Television miniseries |
| 1979–1984 | Hart to Hart | Jonathan Hart | 111 episodes Nominated – Golden Globe Award for Best Actor – Television Series Drama (1980); Nominated – Golden Globe Award for Best Actor – Television Series Drama (1981); Nominated – Golden Globe Award for Best Actor – Television Series Drama (1983); Nominated – Golden Globe Award for Best Actor – Television Series Drama (1984) |
| 1980 | The Jacques Cousteau Odyssey | Narrator | 2 episodes |
| 1981 | The Fall Guy | Himself | Episode: "The Meek Shall Inherit Rhonda" |
| 1984 | To Catch a King | Joe Jackson | Television movie |
| 1985–1986 | Lime Street | James Greyson Culver | 8 episodes |
| 1986 | There Must Be a Pony | Ben Nichols | Television movie |
| 1987 | Love Among Thieves | Mike Chambers | Television movie |
| 1988 | Windmills of the Gods | Mike Slade | Television miniseries |
| 1988 | Indiscreet | Philip Adams | Television movie |
| 1989 | Around the World in 80 Days | Alfred Bennett | Television miniseries |
| 1991 | This Gun for Hire | "Raven" | Television movie |
| 1991 | False Arrest | Ron Lukezic | Television movie |
| 1992 | Jewels | Charles Davenport | Television miniseries |
| 1993 | Les audacieux | Charles Madigan | Television movie |
| 1993–1996 | Hart To Hart | Jonathan Hart | Eight television movies |
| 1994 | Parallel Lives | Sheriff | Television movie |
| 1994 | The Arsenio Hall Show | Himself | One episode |
| 1994 | North & South: Book 3, Heaven & Hell | Cooper Main | Television miniseries |
| 1995 | Cybill | Jonathan Hart | Uncredited; Episode: "Virgin, Mother, Crone" |
| 1997 | Seinfeld | Dr. Abbot | Episode: "The Yada Yada" |
| 1999 | Fatal Error | Albert Teal | Television movie |
| 1999 | Camino de Santiago | William Derek | Television miniseries |
| 2000 | Rocket's Red Glare | Gus Baker | Television movie |
| 2000 | Becoming Dick | Edward | Television movie |
| 2001 | The Retrievers | Durham Haysworth | Television movie |
| 2003 | A Screwball Homicide | Sheldon Bennett | Television movie |
| 2003 | On the Spot | Barry Butters | Episode: "Little Brenda Dynamite" |
| 2003–2006 | Hope & Faith | Jack Fairfield | 7 episodes |
| 2005 | The Simpsons | Himself | Episode: "Goo Goo Gai Pan" |
| 2005 | The Fallen Ones | Morton | Television movie |
| 2005 | Category 7: The End of the World | Senator Ryan Carr | Television movie |
| 2006 | Las Vegas | Alex Avery | Credited as Robert J. Wagner; Episode: "Cash Springs Eternal" |
| 2006 | Boston Legal | Barry Goal | Episodes: "BL: Los Angeles" and "Spring Fever" |
| 2007 | Hustle | Anthony Westley | Episode: "As One Flew Out, One Flew In" |
| 2007–2008 | Two and a Half Men | Teddy Leopold | 5 episodes |
| 2008 | Pretty/Handsome | Scotch Fitzpayne | Unaired pilot |
| 2008 | The Bonnie Hunt Show | Himself | One episode |
| 2010–2019 | NCIS | Anthony DiNozzo Sr. | 13 episodes |
| 2012 | Happily Divorced | Douglas | Episode: "Meet the Parents" |
| 2012 | The League | "Gumpa" Duke | Episode: "Bro-Lo El Cordero" |
| 2013 | Futurama | Himself (voice) | Episode "Calculon 2.0" |
| 2014 | Hot in Cleveland | Jim | Episode: "Bossy Cups" |
| 2014 | Northpole | Santa Claus | Television movie |
| 2017 | Date My Dad | Armand | Episode: "Graduation Day" |
| 2018 | Donna's Inferno | The Evil One | Unknown episodes |
| 2020 | Natalie Wood: What Remains Behind | Himself | Documentary |

== Books ==
- Wagner, Robert J. (with Scott Eyman) (2008). Pieces of My Heart: A Life. New York: Harper Collins. ISBN 978-0-06-137331-2.
- Wagner, Robert J. (with Scott Eyman) (2014). You Must Remember This: The Life and Style of Hollywood's Golden Age. New York: Viking. ISBN 978-0-670-02609-8.
- Wagner, Robert J. (with Scott Eyman) (2016). I Loved Her in the Movies: Memories of Hollywood's Legendary Actresses. New York: Viking. ISBN 978-0-525-42911-1.
