= House of Blues =

American chain of live music concert halls and restaurants

House of Blues Entertainment, LLC.
- Type: Subsidiary
- Industry: Live music; dining
- Founded: November 26, 1992; 33 years ago in Cambridge, Massachusetts, U.S.
- Founders: Isaac Tigrett; Dan Aykroyd
- Headquarters: Los Angeles, California, U.S.
- Number of locations: 11
- Parent: Live Nation Entertainment
- Website: houseofblues.com

House of Blues is an American chain of live music concert halls and restaurants. It was founded by Isaac Tigrett, the co-founder of Hard Rock Cafe, and Dan Aykroyd, co-writer and co-star of the 1980 film The Blues Brothers. The first location opened at Harvard Square in Cambridge, Massachusetts, on November 26, 1992 (Thanksgiving Day). The chain has been a division of Live Nation Entertainment since July 2006, and there are 11 locations throughout the United States as of 2025.

== Overview ==
The first House of Blues opened on November 26, 1992, in the Harvard Square commercial district and retail area of Cambridge, Massachusetts, as a live music concert hall and restaurant. The company was financed by Dan Aykroyd, Aerosmith, Paul Shaffer, River Phoenix, Jim Belushi, John Candy, and Harvard University, among others. This location closed in 2003 as the company sought a larger Boston venue. However, the hands-in-concrete driveway where members of the Blues Brothers and others left their mark, remains. Aykroyd is still associated with the brand and attends most openings, performing as one half of The Blues Brothers.

In 1993, House of Blues launched a 501(c)(3) non-profit called International House of Blues Foundation which provided arts programs, resources and musical instruments for youths. The Music Forward Foundation continues to provide services for youth and has generated more than $20 million of support for these programs over its 20+ year existence. Also in 1993, the syndicated program The House of Blues Radio Hour launched in partnership with CBS Radio Hour. The show is hosted by Aykroyd, in character as Elwood Blues, and focuses on the history of blues music and the contemporary artists honoring the art form. Its final episode aired in July 2017. In 2024, The House of Blues Radio Hour was acquired by the U.S. Library of Congress.

"The Library of Congress has acquired the House of Blues Radio Hour spanning 20 years' worth of programs that promoted the blues, introduced new audiences to the popular music genre and showcased emerging talent. Hosted by celebrity actor-musician Dan Aykroyd, the series was a soulful journey through a cornerstone of American music, offering poignant interviews and stories of blues legends past and present, including B.B. King, Muddy Waters, Bonnie Raitt, and John Lee Hooker, among many others."

In 1999, House of Blues acquired Universal Concerts from Seagram. On July 5, 2006, Live Nation acquired House of Blues Entertainment and created the Live Nation Club and Theater Division. As a division of Live Nation, the company operates 11 clubs throughout North America.

== Locations ==
=== Active ===
Metro vicinity	Venue location	Address	Opened	Capacity
New Orleans	French Quarter	225 Decatur St; New Orleans, LA 70130	1994	1,000
Chicago	Marina City	329 N Dearborn St; Chicago, IL 60654	1996	1,400
Myrtle Beach	Barefoot Landing	4640 Hwy 17 S North Myrtle Beach, SC 29582	1997	2,100
Orlando	Disney Springs	1490 E Buena Vista Dr; Lake Buena Vista, FL 32830	1997	2,600
Las Vegas	Las Vegas Strip (inside Mandalay Bay)	3950 S Las Vegas Blvd; Las Vegas, NV 89119	1999	2,000
Cleveland	Downtown Cleveland	308 Euclid Ave; Cleveland, OH 44114	2004	1,300
San Diego	Downtown San Diego	1055 5th Ave; San Diego, CA 92101	2005	1,500
Dallas–Ft. Worth	Victory Park	2200 N Lamar St; Dallas, TX 75202	2007	1,750
Houston	Downtown Houston	1204 Caroline St; Houston, TX 77002	2008	1,800
Boston	Kenmore Square	15 Lansdowne St; Boston, MA 02215	2009	2,425
Los Angeles	Anaheim GardenWalk	400 West Disney Way #337; Anaheim, CA 92802	2017	2,200

=== Former ===
Metro vicinity	Venue location	Address	Opened	Closed	Notes	Capacity
Boston	Harvard Square	96 Winthrop St; Cambridge, MA 02138	1992	2003	Replaced by Kenmore Square location in 2009.	180
Los Angeles / Orange County	Sunset Strip	8430 Sunset Blvd; West Hollywood, CA 90069	1994	2015		1,100
Los Angeles / Orange County	Downtown Disney	1530 Disneyland Dr; Anaheim, CA 92802	2001	2016	Relocated to nearby Anaheim GardenWalk in 2017.	1,100
Atlanta	Downtown Atlanta	152 Luckie St NW; Atlanta, Georgia 30303	1996	1997	Re-branded as The Tabernacle in 1997.	2,000
Atlantic City	Atlantic City Boardwalk (inside Showboat Atlantic City)	801 Boardwalk; Atlantic City, NJ 08401	2005	2014	Fully intact, used for private events.	2,380

== Gallery ==
San Diego House of Blues in San Diego, California near Petco Park, the Gaslamp Quarter and the ocean.

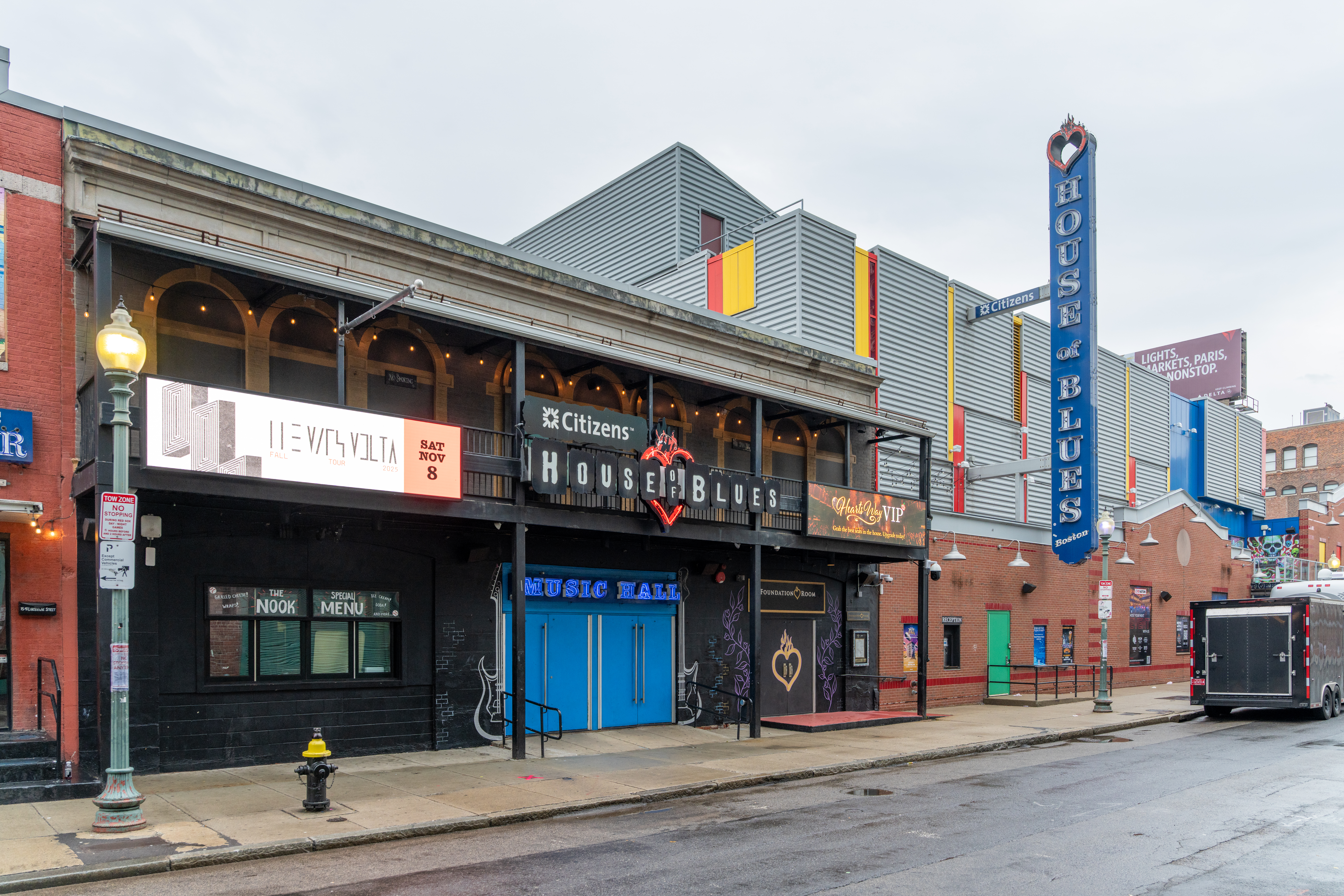
House of Blues across the street from Fenway Park in Boston

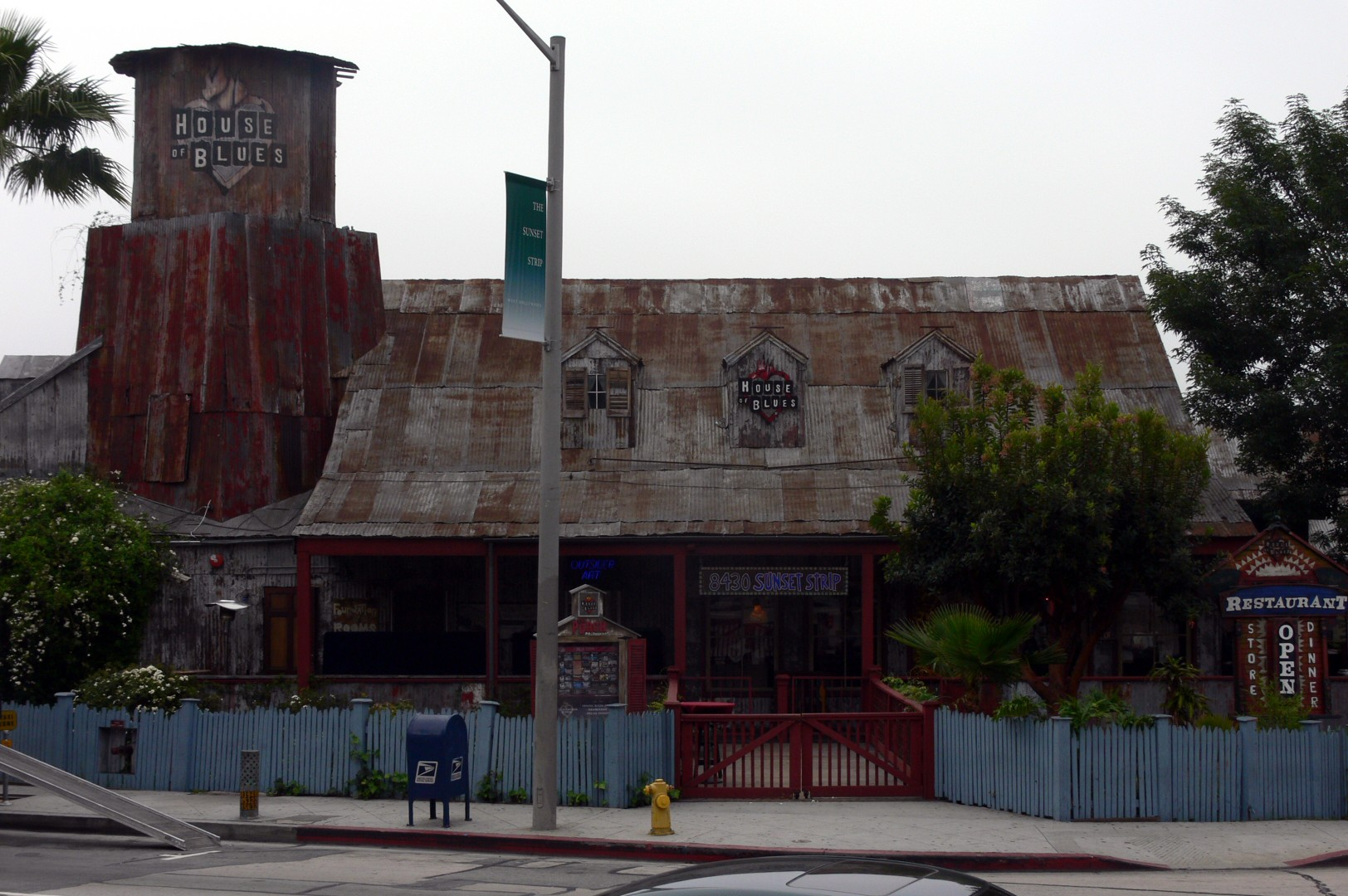
House of Blues Sunset in West Hollywood.

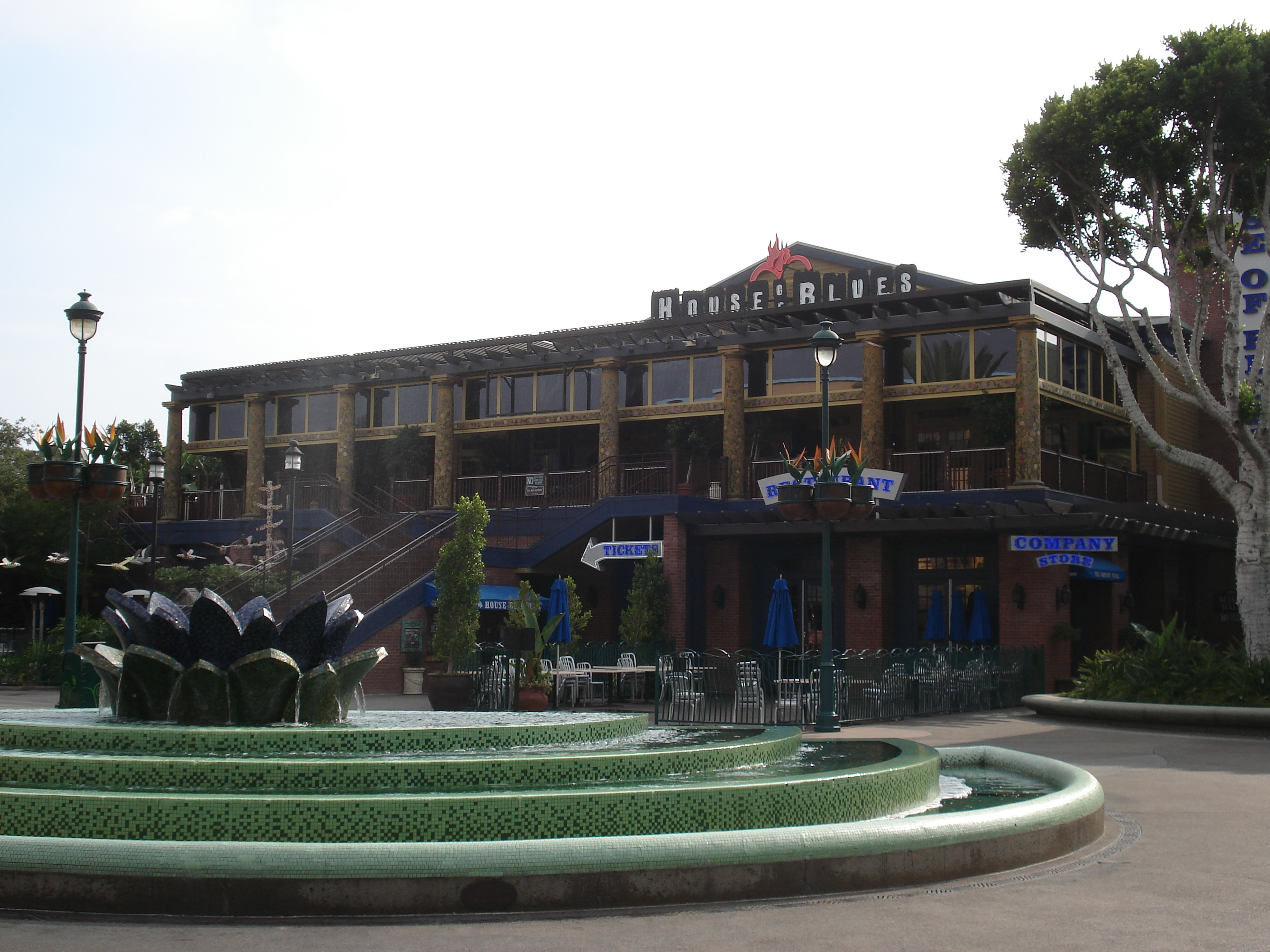
Former location at Downtown Disney in Anaheim, California.

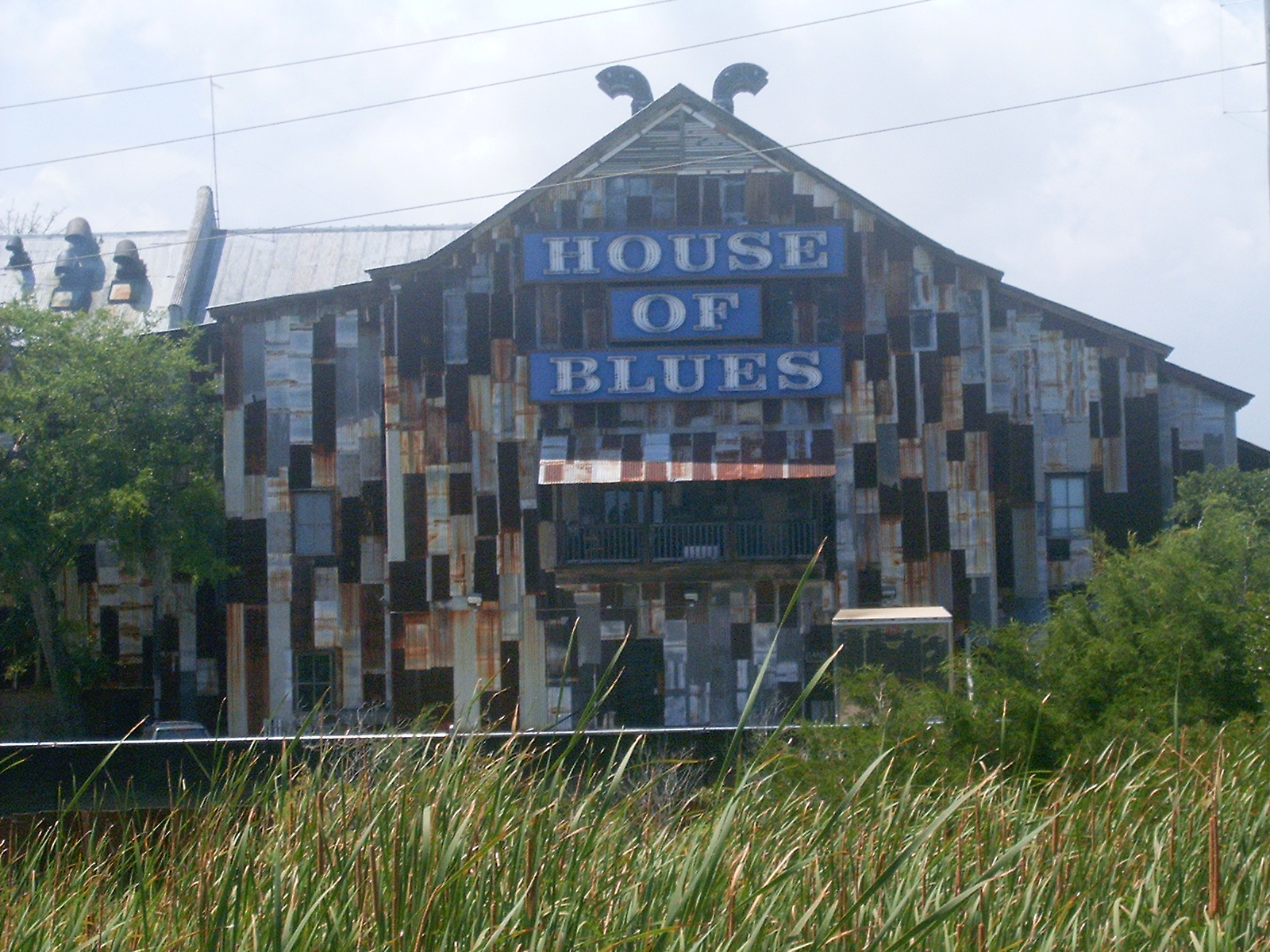
House of Blues in North Myrtle Beach.

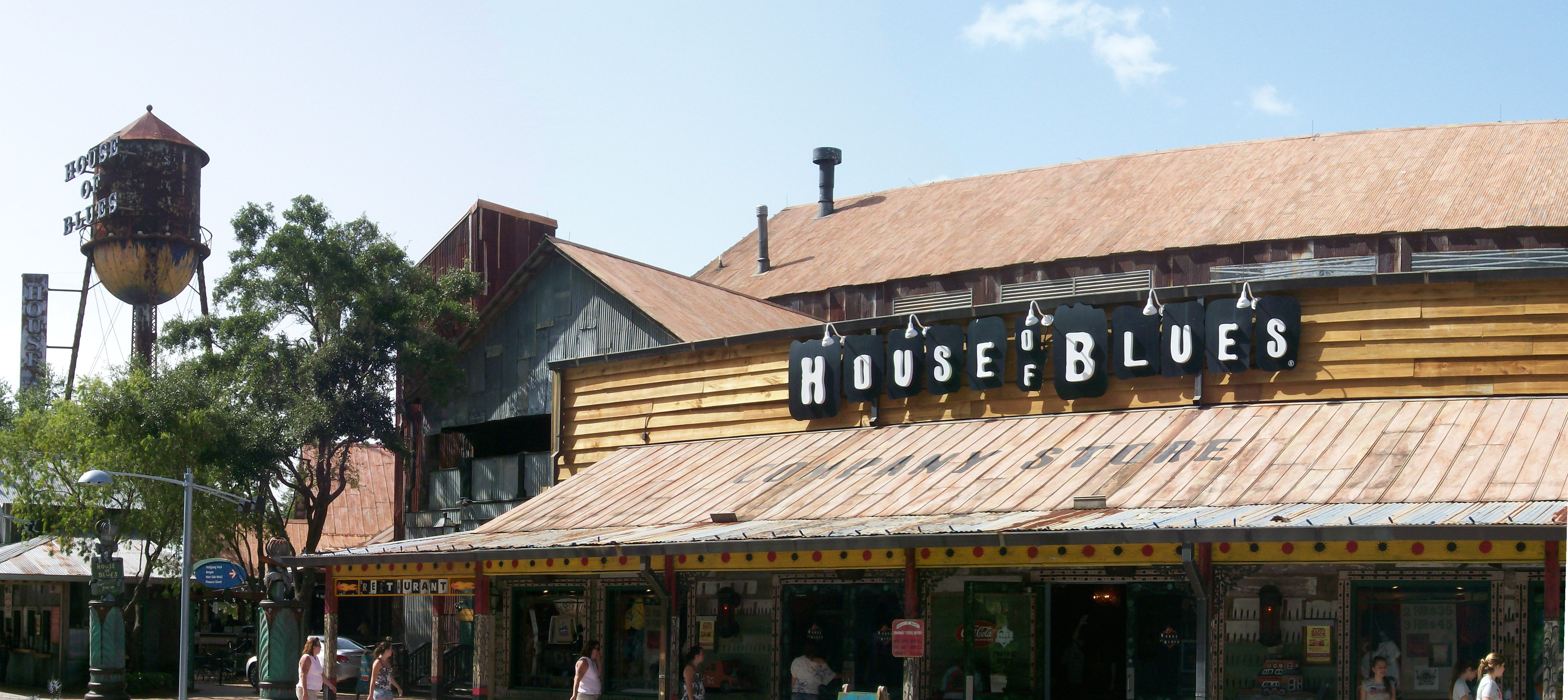
House of Blues at Disney Springs in Florida.

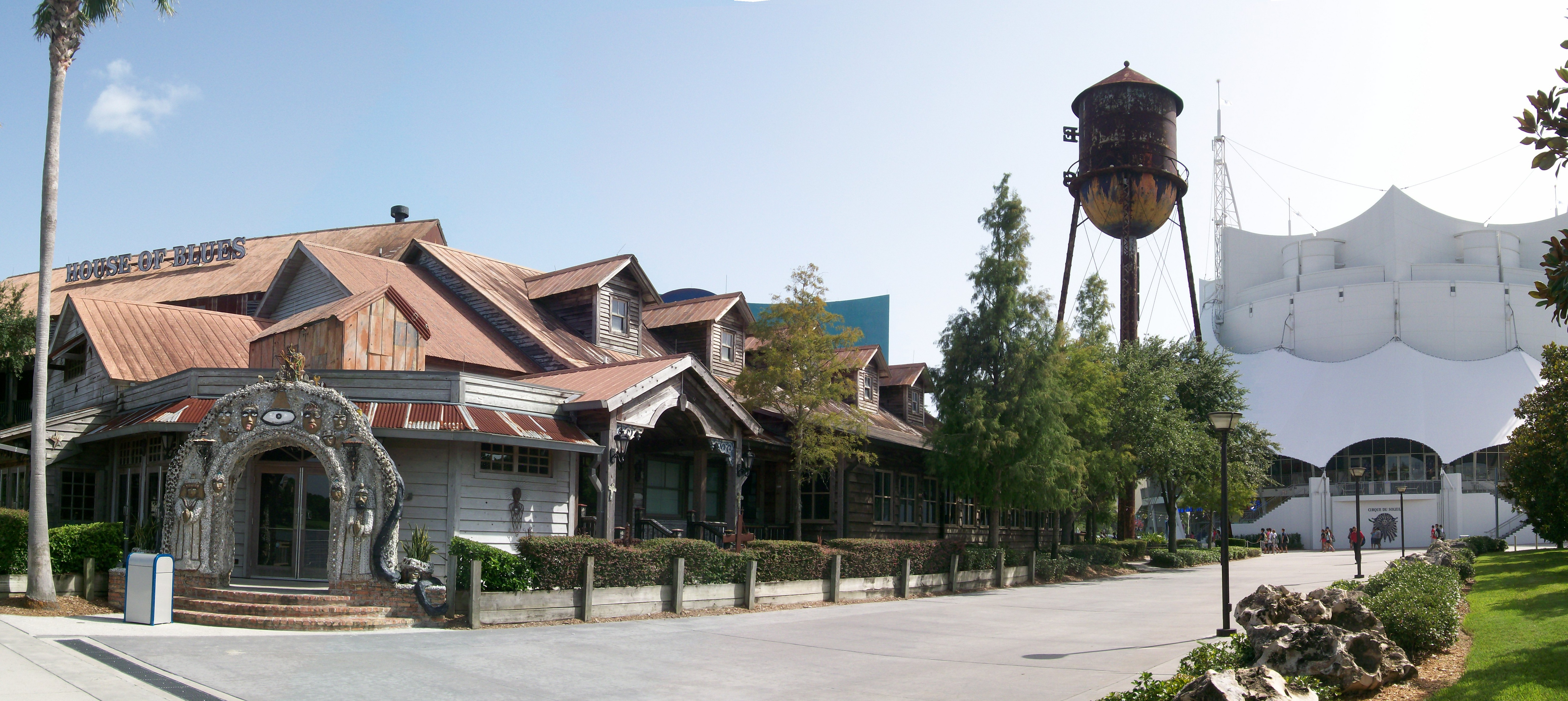
House of Blues at Disney Springs in Florida.

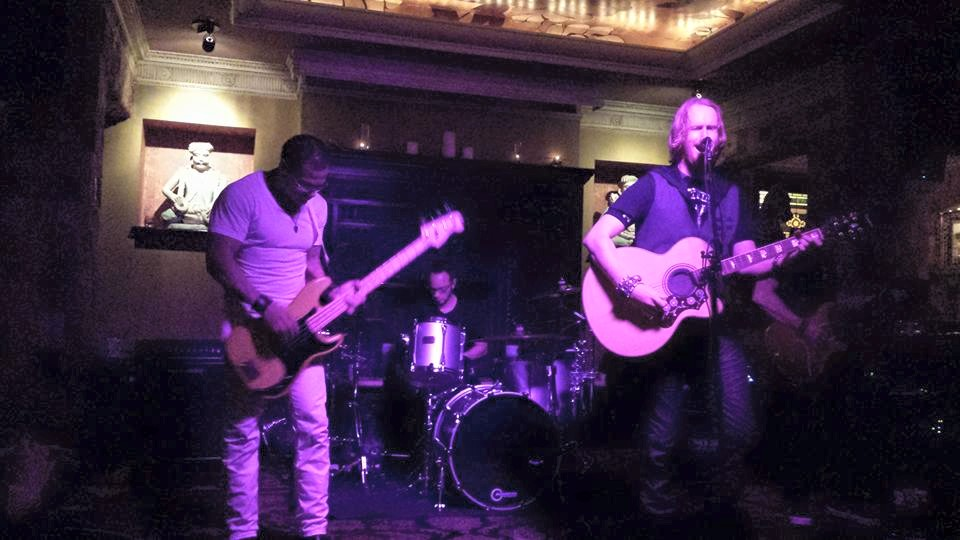
American rock band Ashes of Eagles from Dallas, Texas performing at the House of Blues.

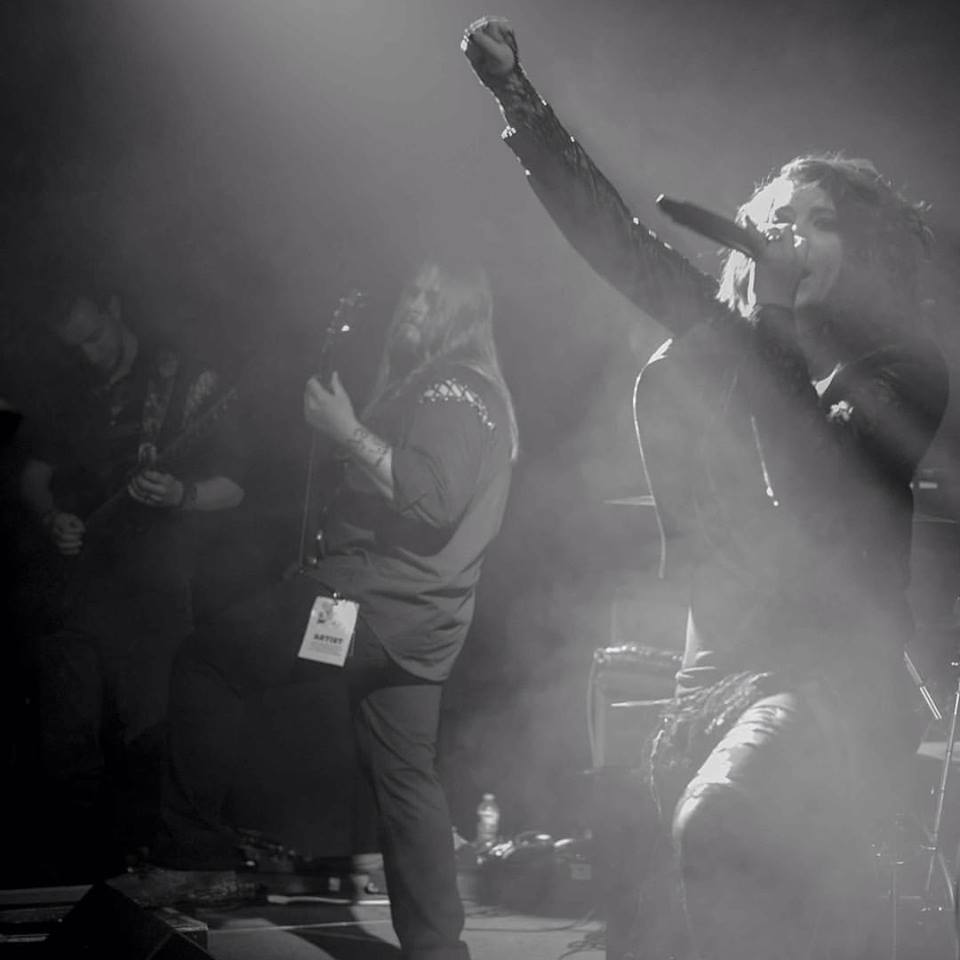
American rock band Drive Thru Society from Dallas, Texas performing at the House of Blues.

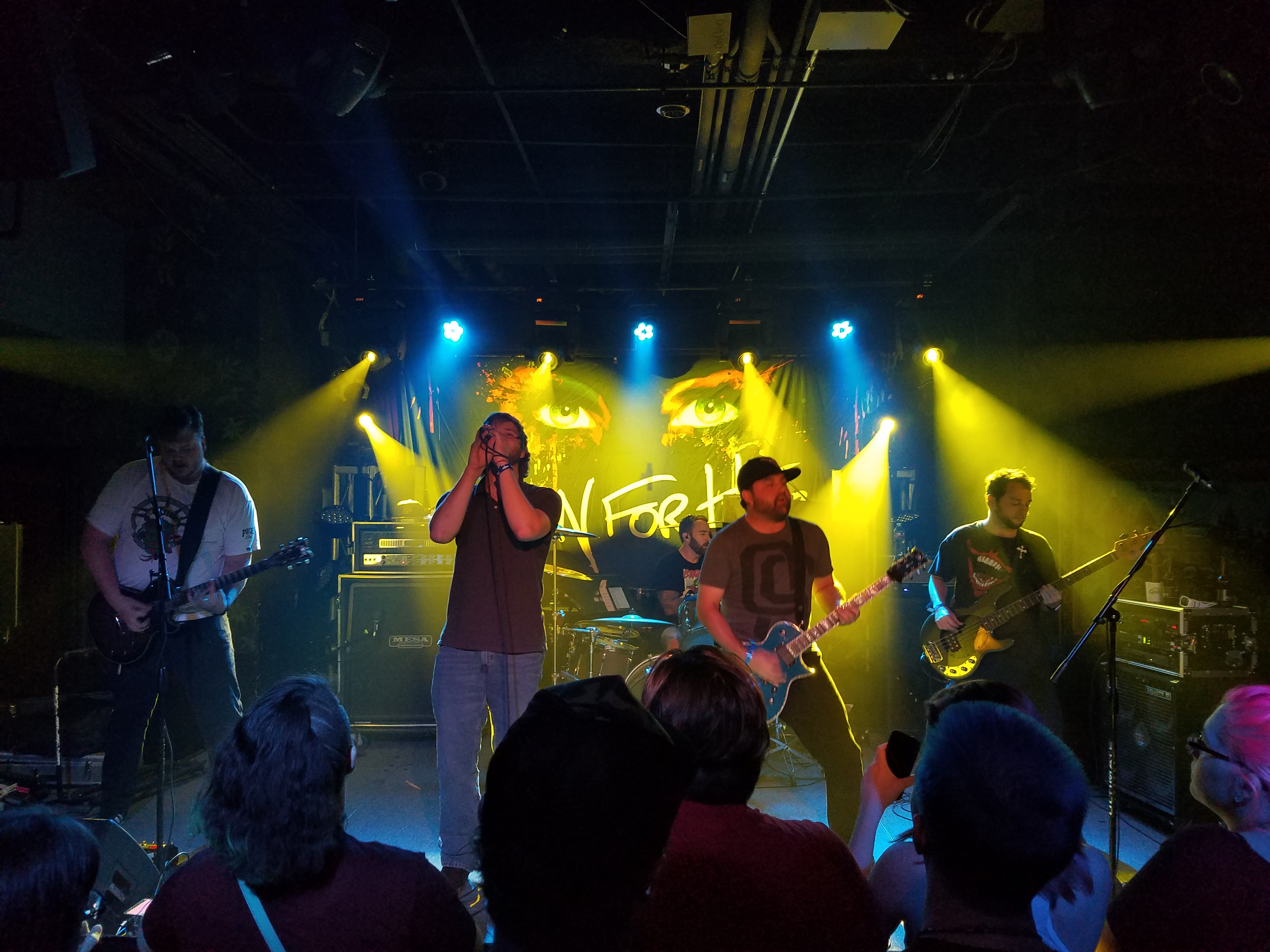
American rock band Like Bridges We Burn from Dallas, Texas performing at the House of Blues.

== See also ==
- Live from the House of Blues, A 1995 TBS television series made in conjunction with the chain
- List of music venues
