= How I Spent My Summer Vacation (1967 film) =

1967 film

- Genre: Adventure; Drama; Mystery; Thriller
- Written by: Gene R. Kearney (as Gene Kearney)
- Directed by: William Hale
- Starring: Robert Wagner; Peter Lawford; Lola Albright; Walter Pidgeon; Jill St. John
- Music by: Lalo Schifrin
- Country of origin: United States
- Original language: English

Production
- Producer: Jack Laird
- Cinematography: Bud Thackery
- Editor: Doughas Stewart
- Running time: 97 minutes
- Production company: Universal Television

Original release
- Network: NBC
- Release: 7 January 1967

How I Spent My Summer Vacation is a 1967 American made-for-television adventure mystery spy film directed by William Hale and starring Robert Wagner, Peter Lawford, Lola Albright, Walter Pidgeon and Jill St. John.

== Plot ==
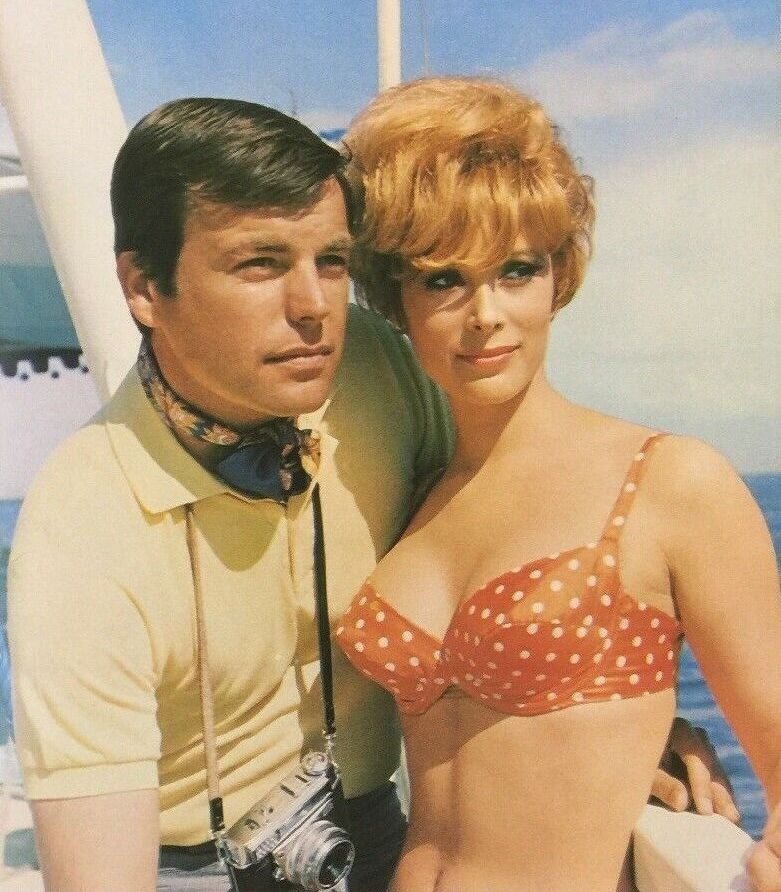
Robert Wagner as Jack Washington and Jill St. John as Nikki Pine

Man in hiding Jack Washington is contacted by another man named Lewis Gannet, who promises money and independence in exchange for a job. Sensing more than he is told, Jack investigates, with the trail leading to an old girlfriend, her family, and danger.

== Cast ==
- Robert Wagner as Jack Washington
- Peter Lawford as Ned Pine
- Lola Albright as Mrs Pine
- Walter Pidgeon as Lewis Gannet
- Jill St. John as Nikki Pine
- Michael Ansara as Pucci
- Len Lesser as The Greek
- Albert Morin as Jewelry Dealer
- Ralph Smiley as Mr Amin
- Tiger Joe Marsh as Yoshiro
- Joni Webster as Miss Karali
- Lyn Peters as The Interviewer
