= Marion Marshall =

American actress (1929–2018)

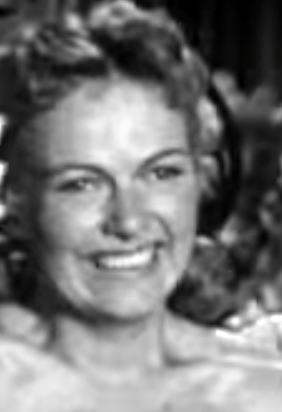
- Marshall in trailer for The Stooge (1952)
- Born: Marian Lepriel Tanner; June 8, 1929; Los Angeles, California, U.S.
- Died: September 24, 2018 (aged 89); Missoula, Montana, U.S.
- Occupation: Actress
- Years active: 1947–1975
- Spouses: Allen Davey (m. 1945; div. 1946) Stanley Donen (m. 1952; div. 1959) Robert Wagner (m. 1963; div. 1971)
- Children: 3, including Joshua Donen and Katie Wagner

Marion Marshall (June 8, 1929 – September 24, 2018) was an American actress.

== Career ==
Marshall's first film appearances were in the 20th Century Fox films Gentleman's Agreement and Daisy Kenyon in 1947 (although they were both uncredited). She went on to play roles (many minor) in over 25 more films until 1967.

Marshall had a small but significant role in I Was a Male War Bride (1949) as the best friend of Ann Sheridan's leading character. She was featured prominently in three Martin and Lewis comedy films, The Stooge, Sailor Beware and That's My Boy, with stars Dean Martin and Jerry Lewis. Among her television appearances, she guest starred twice on Perry Mason in 1959. She played murderer Irene Bedford in "The Case of the Shattered Dream," and title character Ginny Hobart in "The Case of the Spurious Sister".

== Personal life ==
Marshall married three times, her first husband being the cameraman Allen Davey. In 1950 she was engaged to director Howard Hawks, but a wedding never took place. Her second husband (from May 20, 1952, until 1959) was director Stanley Donen, with whom she had two sons, Peter and Joshua.

On July 21, 1963, in New York City, she married actor Robert Wagner following a 20-month engagement. They had one daughter, Katie, before divorcing in 1971.

== Death ==
Marshall died on September 24, 2018, at a retirement community in Missoula, Montana, at the age of 89. Ex-husband Wagner paid tribute to her on social media.

== Filmography ==
- Daisy Kenyon (1947) (uncredited) as Law Office Telephone Operator
- You Were Meant for Me (1948) (uncredited) Bit Part
- Sitting Pretty (1948) (uncredited) as Secretary
- The Street with No Name (1948) (uncredited) as Singer
- The Luck of the Irish (1948) (uncredited) as Secretary
- Road House (1948) (uncredited) as Millie
- Apartment for Peggy (1948) as Ruth
- The Snake Pit (1948) (uncredited) as Young Girl
- Unfaithfully Yours (1948) (uncredited) as Maisie, Second Telephone Operator
- When My Baby Smiles at Me (1948) (uncredited) as Chorus Girl
- I Was a Male War Bride (1949) as Lt. Kitty Lawrence
- Dancing in the Dark (1949) (uncredited) as Myrna
- Wabash Avenue (1950) (uncredited) as Chorus Girl
- A Ticket to Tomahawk (1950) (uncredited) as Annie
- Love That Brute (1950) (uncredited) as Dawn O'Day
- Stella (1950) as Mary
- My Blue Heaven (1950) (uncredited) as Bit Role
- Halls of Montezuma (1950) (uncredited) as Nurse
- I Can Get It for You Wholesale (1951) (uncredited) as Terry
- That's My Boy (1951) as Terry Howard
- Sailor Beware (1952) as Hilda Jones
- The Stooge (1952) as Genevieve 'Frecklehead' Tait
- Peter Gunn as Joanna Lund (1 episode, 1958)
- I Want to Live! (1958) (uncredited) as Rita
- Schlitz Playhouse of Stars as Belle (1 episode, 1958)
- Perry Mason as Irene Bedford (1 episode, 1958)
- Have Gun – Will Travel as Maggie O'Bannion (1 episode, 1959)
- Perry Mason as Ginny Hobart / (2 episodes, 1959)
- Westinghouse Desilu Playhouse as Ronnie Portman (1 episode, 1960)
- Via Margutta (1963) as Grace
- Gunn (1967) (as M.T. Marshall) as Daisy Jane
- It Takes a Thief as Myrna (1 episode, 1968)
- Six Days of Justice as Magistrate (1 episode, 1975)
