= Live from the House of Blues =

Live from the House of Blues is a 26-part (one hour each) television program on TBS that started airing in January 1995 at 12:05 AM Eastern Time on Friday nights and repeated at the same time on Saturday nights. The time slot was the same time slot that another TBS music program, Night Tracks once occupied from 1983 to 1992. It featured pre-taped in-concert performances which, despite the title, were frequently not of blues music, performed by such contemporary artists as Sheryl Crow, The Neville Brothers, They Might Be Giants, Victoria Williams, Public Enemy, and many others.

The show was fronted by Dan Aykroyd in character as Elwood Blues, who gave a brief pre-credit introduction to each episode. After the opening credits, the episodes were then hosted on a rotating basis by one (or occasionally two) of Mari Vigueira, Katie Wagner and Garett Maggart. Elwood Blues co-hosted at least one episode (with Wagner), and also appeared as a special musical guest playing harmonica alongside Blues Traveler. Aykroyd was a founding partner in the House of Blues chain of nightclubs where the show was taped.

The show was produced by Michael Murphy Productions in conjunction with the House of Blues franchise, and was filmed at their Los Angeles, New Orleans and Cambridge locations. The program ended its run in 1996. It was sponsored by Pontiac and the Pontiac Sunfire.
