= Joshua Donen =

American film producer

Joshua Donen (born August 10, 1955) is an American film producer. He is the son of director Stanley Donen and actress Marion Marshall.

Donen dated Cher from 1984 to 1985. From 1995 to 2017, he was married to Nicolette Bret and raised her son, Cooper Mount (b. 1987).

== Work ==
- The Quick and the Dead (1995)
- Underneath (1995; executive producer)
- The Great White Hype (1996)
- Armored (2009)
- Drag Me to Hell (2009; executive producer)
- Spartacus: Blood and Sand (2010; executive producer)
- Oz the Great and Powerful (2013)
- House of Cards (2013; executive producer)
- Mindhunter (2017; executive producer)
- Love, Death & Robots (2019)
- Voir (2021; executive producer)
