= List of Fury episodes =

Fury (retitled Brave Stallion in syndicated reruns) is an American Western television series that aired on NBC from 1955 to 1960. It stars Peter Graves as Jim Newton, who operates the Broken Wheel Ranch in California; Bobby Diamond as Jim's adopted son, Joey Clark Newton, and William Fawcett as ranch hand Pete Wilkey. Roger Mobley co-starred in the two final seasons as Homer "Packy" Lambert, a friend of Joey's.

== Series overview ==
Season	Episodes	Originally released	
Season	Episodes	First released	Last released
1	26	October 15, 1955	April 7, 1956
2	20	October 6, 1956	March 30, 1957
3	26	October 12, 1957	April 5, 1958
4	22	October 4, 1958	April 4, 1959
5	22	October 10, 1959	March 19, 1960

== Episode list ==
=== Season 1: 1955–56 ===
No. overall	No. in season	Title	Original release date
1	1	"Joey Finds a Friend"	October 15, 1955
2	2	"Killer Stallion"	October 22, 1955
3	3	"The Horse Coper"	October 29, 1955
4	4	"Joey Goes Hunting"	November 5, 1955
5	5	"Scorched Earth"	November 12, 1955
6	6	"Joey's Dame Trouble"	November 19, 1955
7	7	"Joey and the Gypsies"	November 26, 1955
8	8	"Joey's Father"	December 3, 1955
9	9	"Joey Saves the Day"	December 10, 1955
10	10	"The 4-H Story"	December 17, 1955
11	11	"Junior Rodeo"	December 24, 1955
12	12	"Ghost Town"	December 31, 1955
13	13	"The Hobo"	January 7, 1956
14	14	"Tungsten Queen"	January 14, 1956
15	15	"Joey Sees It Through"	January 21, 1956
16	16	"Stolen Fury"	January 28, 1956
17	17	"The Choice"	February 4, 1956
18	18	"The Boy Scout Story"	February 11, 1956
19	19	"Search for Joey"	February 18, 1956
20	20	"The Miracle"	February 25, 1956
21	21	"The Test"	March 3, 1956
22	22	"Fury Runs to Win"	March 10, 1956
23	23	"Timber"	March 17, 1956
24	24	"Wonder Horse"	March 24, 1956
25	25	"Pirate Treasure"	March 31, 1956
26	26	"The Baby"	April 7, 1956

=== Season 2: 1956–57 ===
No. overall	No. in season	Title	Original release date
27	1	"The Runaway"	October 6, 1956
28	2	"Joey and the Little League"	October 13, 1956
29	3	"Earthquake"	October 20, 1956
30	4	"Trial by Jury"	October 27, 1956
31	5	"Joey and the Wolf Pack"	November 3, 1956
32	6	"Indian Mountain"	November 17, 1956
33	7	"Flying Saucers"	November 24, 1956
34	8	"Joey and the Stranger"	December 1, 1956
35	9	"Pete's Folly"	December 15, 1956
36	10	"Boy's Day"	December 22, 1956
37	11	"The Feud"	January 5, 1957
38	12	"Loco Weed Story"	January 12, 1957
39	13	"The Horse Caper"	January 19, 1957
40	14	"Joey Shows the Way"	January 26, 1957
41	15	"Nature's Engineers"	February 2, 1957
42	16	"The Strong Man"	February 16, 1957
43	17	"The Scientists"	February 23, 1957
44	18	"My Horse Ajax"	March 9, 1957
45	19	"The Tomboy"	March 16, 1957
46	20	"Joey, Junior Lifeguard"	March 30, 1957

=== Season 3: 1957–58 ===
No. overall	No. in season	Title	Original release date
47	1	"Fire Prevention Week"	October 12, 1957
48	2	"The Racers"	October 19, 1957
49	3	"Community Chest"	October 26, 1957
50	4	"Mercy Flight"	November 2, 1957
51	5	"The Renegade"	November 9, 1957
52	6	"Pee Wee Grows Up"	November 16, 1957
53	7	"The Fourth Estaters"	November 23, 1957
54	8	"The Tornado"	November 30, 1957
55	9	"The Pinto Stallion"	December 7, 1957
56	10	"Bike Road-eo"	December 14, 1957
57	11	"The Wayfarer"	December 21, 1957
58	12	"One Thousand Dollar Reward"	December 28, 1957
59	13	"Operation CD"	January 4, 1958
60	14	"The Break-Up"	January 11, 1958
61	15	"Joey's First Crush"	January 18, 1958
62	16	"Pee Wee's Problem"	January 25, 1958
63	17	"The Lost Herd"	February 1, 1958
64	18	"The Baby Sitters"	February 8, 1958
65	19	"The Horse Nobody Wanted"	February 15, 1958
66	20	"The Bounty Hunters"	February 22, 1958
67	21	"The Meanest Man"	March 1, 1958
68	22	"A Fish Story"	March 8, 1958
69	23	"Rogues and Squires"	March 15, 1958
70	24	"Robbers' Roost"	March 22, 1958
71	25	"Second Chance"	March 29, 1958
72	26	"The Claim Jumpers"	April 5, 1958

=== Season 4: 1958–59 ===
No. overall	No. in season	Title	Original release date
73	1	"The Littlest Horse Thief"	October 4, 1958
74	2	"Aunt Harriet"	October 11, 1958
75	3	"Palomino"	October 18, 1958
76	4	"Halloween"	October 25, 1958
77	5	"Jailbreak"	November 1, 1958
78	6	"The Fire Watchers"	November 15, 1958
79	7	"The Ornithologists"	November 22, 1958
80	8	"The Unwanted Shepherd"	November 29, 1958
81	9	"Troubles Have Wings"	December 6, 1958
82	10	"The Model Plane"	December 20, 1958
83	11	"The Will"	December 27, 1958
84	12	"The Pulling Contest"	January 3, 1959
85	13	"Ten Dollars a Head"	January 17, 1959
86	14	"Feeling His Oats"	January 24, 1959
87	15	"Bad Medicine"	January 31, 1959
88	16	"Sonic Boom"	February 7, 1959
89	17	"An Old Indian Trick"	February 14, 1959
90	18	"The Relay Station"	February 21, 1959
91	19	"Black Gold"	February 28, 1959
92	20	"Girl Scout"	March 7, 1959
93	21	"House Guests"	March 14, 1959
94	22	"Joey's Jalopy"	April 4, 1959

=== Season 5: 1959–60 ===
No. overall	No. in season	Title	Original release date
95	1	"Junior Achievement"	October 10, 1959
96	2	"The Big Leaguer"	October 17, 1959
97	3	"Trail Drive"	October 24, 1959
98	4	"Man-Killer"	October 31, 1959
99	5	"Visiting Day"	November 7, 1959
100	6	"Timber Walker"	November 14, 1959
101	7	"Turkey Day"	November 21, 1959
102	8	"The Map"	November 28, 1959
103	9	"The Rocketeers"	December 5, 1959
104	10	"The Fort"	December 12, 1959
105	11	"The Vanishing Blacksmith"	December 19, 1959
106	12	"The Big Brothers"	December 26, 1959
107	13	"Packy, the Lion Tamer"	January 2, 1960
108	14	"Private Eyes"	January 9, 1960
109	15	"The Witch"	January 16, 1960
110	16	"Gymkhana"	January 23, 1960
111	17	"A Present for Packy"	January 30, 1960
112	18	"Trottin' Horse"	February 6, 1960
113	19	"Packy's Dilemma"	February 13, 1960
114	20	"Gaucho"	February 20, 1960
115	21	"The Skin Divers"	February 27, 1960
116	22	"Packy's Dream"	March 19, 1960
