= Leon Fromkess =

American film and television producer

Leon Fromkess was a film and television producer in the United States. He was an executive at Producers Releasing Corporation, producing several Edgar G. Ulmer films.

== Biography ==
He graduated from Columbia University in 1926. He helped Columbia Pictures refinance debt and went on to help organize Producers Releasing Corporation and produced more than 200 films with it.

== Filmography ==
- Gallant Lady(1942)
- Baby Face Morgan (1942)
- Jive Junction (1943)
- Isle of Forgotten Sins (1943)
- The Ghost and the Guest (1943), production supervisor
- When the Lights Go On Again (1944)
- The Great Mike (1944)
- Bkuebeard (1944)
- Minstrel Man (1944)
- Detour (1945)
- Fog Island (1945)
- Club Havana (1945)
- Strange Illusion (1945)
- Crime, Inc. (1945)
- Dangerous Intruder (1945)
- Hollywood and Vine (1945)
- The Missing Corpse (1945)
- Danny Boy (1946)
- A Song is Born (1948)
- The Wife of Monte Cristo (1948)
- Shock Corridor (1963) executive producer (uncredited)
- The Naked Kiss (1964) executive producer (uncredited)
- Blood on the Arrow (1964)
- The Great Sioux Massacre (1965)
- Flareup (1969)

=== Television ===
- The Halls of Ivy (1950-1952)
- Gruen Playhouse
- The Adventures of Kit Carson
- Lassie (1954 TV series)
- New York Confidential (TV series)
- Fury (American TV series)
- Ramar of the Jungle
- The Adventures of Tugboat Annie (1957)
- The New Adventures of Charlie Chan (1957-1958)

== See also ==
- Television Programs of America
- Poverty Row
