= Airborne (1962 film) =

1962 film

- Original film poster
- Directed by: James Landis
- Written by: James Landis
- Produced by: Art Diamond
- Starring: Bobby Diamond; Carolyn Byrd; Robert Christian; Mike Angel
- Cinematography: Lawrence Raimond
- Edited by: Rocco Moriano
- Music by: Allyn Ferguson; William Hinshaw
- Production company: A. Diamond Productions
- Distributed by: Gillman Film Corp.; Parade Releasing Organization
- Release date: 30 May 1962
- Running time: 80 minutes
- Country: United States
- Language: English

Airborne is a 1962 American drama film written and directed by James Landis and starring Bobby Diamond. As of 2009 it is in the Public Domain and can be streamed on YouTube or downloaded via the Internet Archive. The film tells the story of a young man (Diamond) and his journey to become a US paratrooper.

Airborne features training methods used by the US jump school at the time and is an interesting historical document in this respect. Closing credits indicate that the film is dedicated to the veterans of the US 82nd Airborne (All American) Division who established the traditions of the unit in World War II.

== Plot ==
Eddie Slocom (Bobby Diamond) is a young country boy from a farm in Indiana who decides to volunteer to become a paratrooper because of his dreams to be like his uncle Charlie, a paratrooper in World War II. Upon arriving at Fort Bragg, North Carolina, he meets a motley crew of volunteers and draftees from varying socio-economic backgrounds with a montage of their basic training shown during the credits. Most notable are Rocky, the bully of the group from Chicago, and Mouse, jive-talking, self-styled "lover" of the group from the Bronx, who both play important supporting roles in the film. There are also the two sergeants of the platoon, the tough veteran platoon sergeant, Sergeant First Class Benner, and his assistant, the more affable and pleasant but still tough Sgt. White (played by the famous Hollywood stunt man Whitney Hughes).

As a wet-behind-the-ears, immature and naive farm-boy and country bumpkin, Eddie is initially mocked by his peers for his wholesome ways and trusting manner, eventually however he earns their respect by his courage, honor, friendliness and his ability to be a good teammate and comrade despite not being the most skilled paratrooper.

Drama develops when Eddie meets a doe-eyed country girl by the name of Jenny May and provides a "love-interest" and a diverting sub-plot to the main theme of the film. Various ups and downs in the life and training of the main protagonist follow.

As time goes by all except Rocky cease their teasing of Eddie. Rocky takes Jenny May away from Eddie at a dance on post, later ridicules Eddie's love letters to her and physically threatens not only Eddie but the other members of the group. When Rocky is overheard ridiculing people from farms and members of the 4-H Club, SFC Benner stands in Rocky's face and loudly reminds him that he too is a farmer and asks him if he would like to repeat his comments to his face but Rocky backs down. He instructs Slocum to recite the values of the 4-H that he advises the men to follow. To further demonstrate that being a paratrooper is more than jumping out of an aircraft, he orders the group to a guided tour of the Division's museum where all but Rocky are impressed by the courage of the Division in two world wars, including an account of another country bumpkin Sgt. Alvin York.

The climax of the training is the platoon's first jump. Rocky collides into Eddie and Rocky's chute collapses. The small Eddie is able to grab Rocky's collapsed parachute and holds it allowing Rocky to land safely. Not only is Rocky shocked by Eddie's courage and strength but also the group of friends he has bullied eagerly run to him to see if he is safe. People sincerely caring about him is something that has never happened to Rocky before. All of the group become buddies and proud members of the US 82nd Airborne Division.

== Cast ==
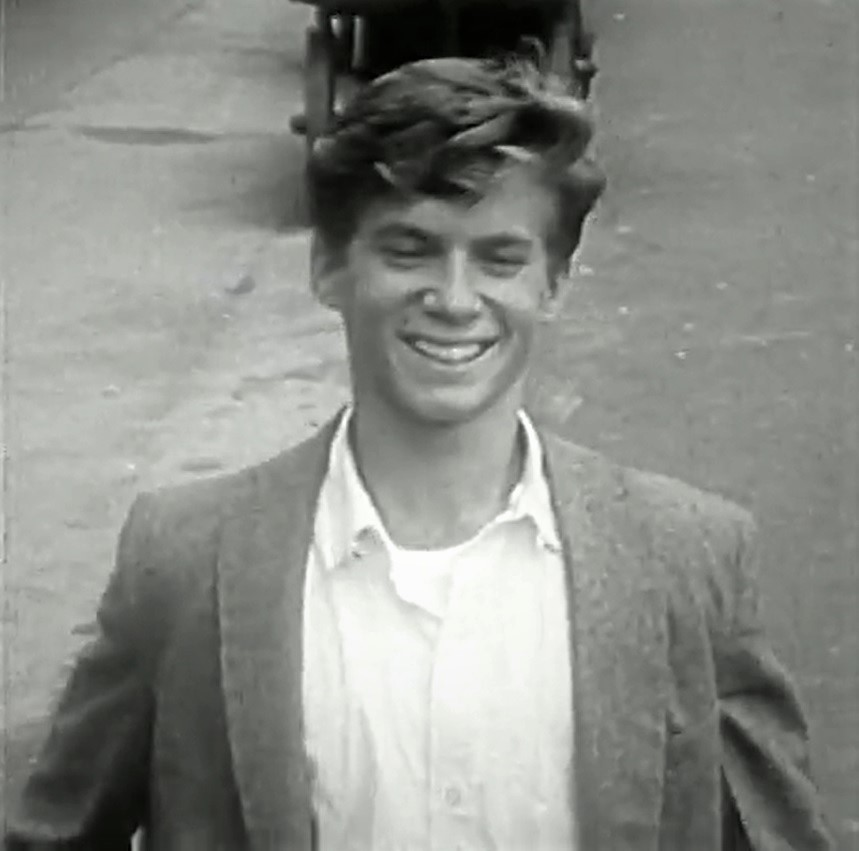
Bobby Diamond in Airborne

- Bobby Diamond as Pvt. Eddie Slocum
- Carolyn Byrd as Jenny May
- Robert Christian as Pvt. Rocky Laymon
- Mike Angel as Pvt. Mouse Talliaferro
- Bill Hale as Sgt. Benner
- Whitey Hughes as Sgt. White
- James Maydock as Pvt. Barnowski
- George Marlowe as Pvt. Erski
- Keith Babcock as Pvt. Gordblitz
- Barbara Markham as Bertha
- Robert May
- D.J. Sullivan
- L. Blue
- John Smothergood
- Carl C. Allgood

== Production ==
Airborne was made with the co-operation of the United States Army and was filmed on location in Fort Bragg, North Carolina, the training ground of the US 82nd Airborne Division. Filming also took place at Aberdeen, North Carolina, and Fayetteville, North Carolina. Capt. Ernest L. Basciano was the technical advisor for the film. Paratroopers used a Fairchild C-119 Flying Boxcar in the training and filming.

Stuntman Whitey Hughes, who had a role in the film, was Bobby Diamond's stunt double on his Fury television series.

== Reception ==
Aftrr its January 1962 release Airborne was moderately well received due to its content and the fame of its star, a well-known 1950s child actor who had co-starred in the Western television series Fury. The film did little to enhance the career of (Bobby Diamond).

=== DVD release ===
Airborne was released on DVD on 9 December 2008.

== See also ==
- Parachute Battalion
- Jumping Jacks
