= Jimmy Baird =

American film and television actor

- Born: 1948 (age 77–78); Seattle, Washington, U.S.
- Occupations: Film and television actor
- Years active: 1954–1965

Jimmy Baird (born 1948) is an American film and television actor. He is known for playing Pee Wee Jenkins in the American western television series Fury.

== Life and career ==
Baird was born in Seattle, Washington. He began his screen career in 1954, appearing in the television series Public Defender. In the same year, he made his film debut in the film There's No Business Like Show Business. He then appeared in the 1955 film The Seven Little Foys playing Eddie Foy Jr.

In 1957 Baird joined the cast of the western television series Fury as Pee Wee Jenkins, the friend of Joey Newton (Bobby Diamond). He guest-starred in television programs including Rawhide, The Lone Ranger, Have Gun, Will Travel, Mr. Novak, Bronco, The Danny Thomas Show, The Real McCoys, U.S. Marshal, The Restless Gun, Lassie, The Twilight Zone, Maverick and My Friend Flicka. He also appeared in films such as I'll Give My Life, The Return of Dracula, The Black Orchid, Rebel Without a Cause, Operation Eichmann and A Dog's Best Friend.
