= Duffy's Tavern (TV series) =

- Genre: Comedy
- Directed by: Harve Foster
- Starring: Ed Gardner; Alan Reed; Pattee Chapman; Jimmy Conlin; Veda Ann Borg; Herb Vigran
- Country of origin: United States
- No. of episodes: 39

Production
- Producer: Hal Roach Jr.
- Production company: Hal Roach Studios

Original release
- Release: 1954

Related
- Duffy's Tavern (radio program)

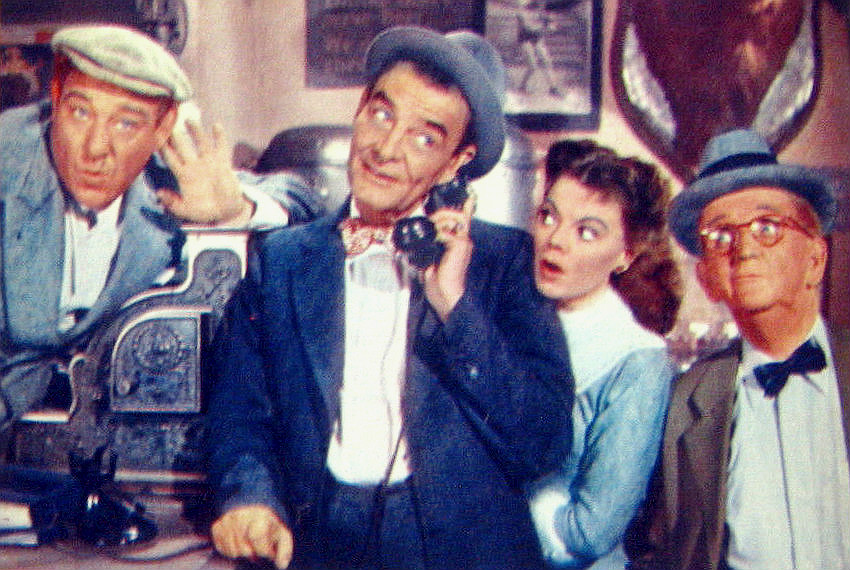
Duffy's Tavern television cast 1954

Duffy's Tavern is an American comedy television series that was syndicated in 1954. It was an adaptation of the Duffy's Tavern radio program, with a total of 39 episodes.

== Overview ==
The titular setting for the show was "a seedy bar and grille on New York's Third Avenue". The cast had Ed Gardner as Archie, Alan Reed as Finnegan, Pattee Chapman as Miss Duffy, Jimmy Conlin as Charlie, Veda Ann Borg as Peaches La Tour, and Herb Vigran as Second Story Jackson.

The radio version of Duffy's Tavern ended in 1952. When the TV version began two years later, Gardner's involvement was limited to acting. He said, "In radio, I was the producer and the director and half the time the writer and also Archie." The TV version had Hal Roach Jr. as producer and Harve Foster as director.

This program was the second effort to have a TV version of Duffy's Tavern. An earlier, hour-long version was filmed for showing as part of the All Star Revue series. It was never broadcast because the Revue was sponsored by a milk company, and the barroom setting conflicted with the company's image.

== Production ==
Hal Roach Studios and Motion Pictures for Television joined forces to produce Duffy's Tavern for TV as the first series in "a master plan to produce high-quality series exclusively for syndication". It turned out to be the partnership's last effort in that regard, also. The joint venture lost money, some of which was recouped in 1956 when the package was sold to Guild Films.

== Critical reception ==
Critic Jack Gould's review of Duffy's Tavern in The New York Times ended with "It is a poor show". Gould placed the blame for the show's lack of success on Gardner, describing his portrayal of Archie as "non-dimensional". Gardner, Gould wrote, forgot his lines and failed "to give the impression of thinking about what he is saying and believing in it" as an actor should.

Alex McNeil, in his book Total Television: the Comprehensive Guide to Programming from 1948 to the Present, noted one difference between the TV and radio versions of the show: "The radio series had been as much a showcase for guest stars (such as Bing Crosby and Clifton Fadiman) as a situation comedy; the TV show was merely the latter".

Hal Erickson, in his book Syndicated Television: The First Forty Years, 1947-1987, described the series as "woefully cookiecutter in design", noting that the radio version's appeal had been undermined by use of "TV-sitcom cliches". He added that the image of the tavern's interior fell short of that created by the radio version in the listener's imagination. Leo Mishkin, in a review in The Philadelphia Inquirer, expressed a similar opinion, ". . . this isn't the same Duffy's Tavern we had known for so many years on the radio. There isn't a single speck of sawdust on the floor. There doesn't seem to be any bar at all . . ."
