= William Fawcett (actor) =

American actor (1894–1974)

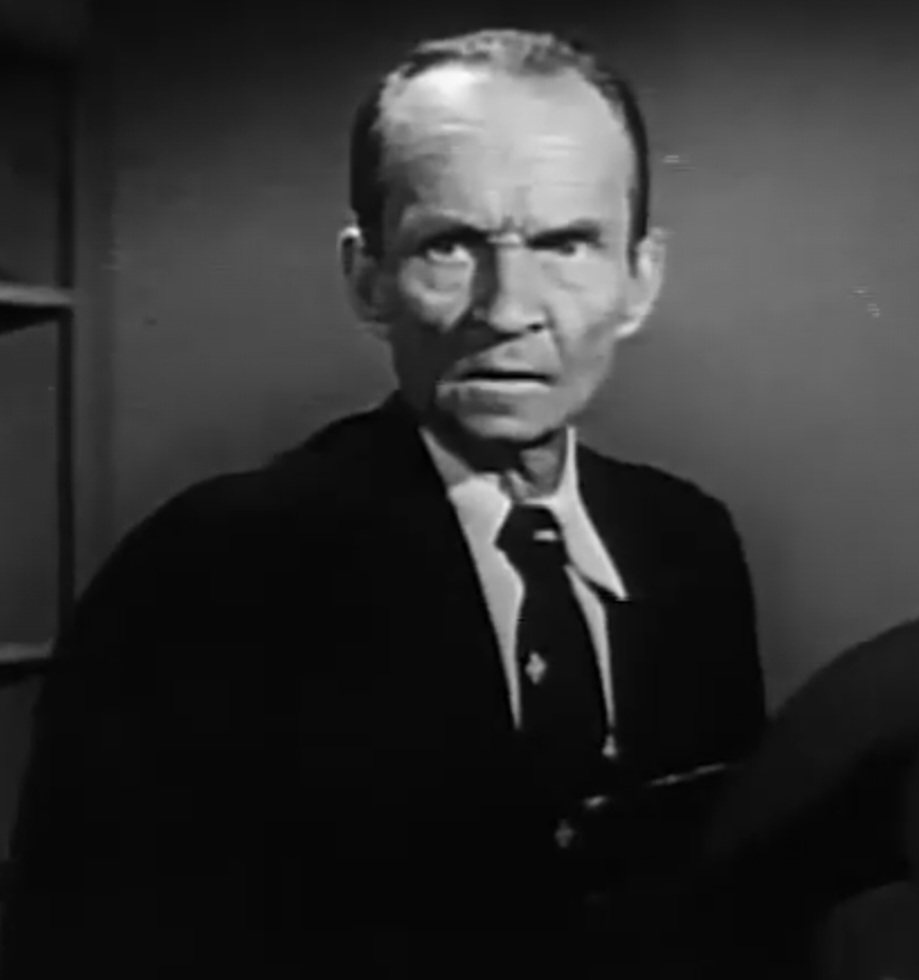
- Fawcett in an episode of The Public Defender (1954)
- Born: William Fawcett Thompson; September 8, 1894; High Forest Township, Minnesota, U.S.
- Died: January 25, 1974 (aged 79); Sherman Oaks, California, U.S.
- Resting place: Roselawn Cemetery, Roseville, Minnesota
- Other name: Doc T
- Occupations: Teacher, Actor
- Years active: 1946–1972
- Spouse: Helene Krag (m. 1925)

William Fawcett Thompson (September 8, 1894 – January 25, 1974) was an American character actor who appeared in hundreds of films and television episodes. Because there were other actors named William Thompson he used his first and middle name when seeking acting roles. He was best known for playing Pete Wilkey in the television series Fury which ran from 1955 to 1960.

== Early life ==
Fawcett's father was a Methodist minister, and after Fawcett attended Hamline University he became licensed to preach in 1916. During World War I, he joined the United States Army, serving as an ambulance driver. The French government honored him with the Legion of Honour for his care of the wounded. After his military service, Fawcett became a teacher of English and literature at the University of Nebraska and, after earning a Ph.D. degree in Elizabethan drama from the school, he became a professor of theatre arts at Michigan State University. In 1925 he married Helene Krag.

== Acting career ==
At the age of 52, Fawcett obtained his first film role in the 1946 Eddie Dean movie Stars Over Texas. He was soon finding steady work acting in movie serials, including Adventures of Sir Galahad (1949), Batman and Robin (1949), and Cody of the Pony Express (1950) Many of Fawcett's film roles were in B movies, such as 1953's The Neanderthal Man but he also had small roles in major movies. He played Cubby Crouch in the 1955 George Montgomery film Seminole Uprising and was cast as a card player in the 1961 John Wayne movie The Comancheros.

Fawcett had roles in seven episodes of The Roy Rogers Show, five episodes of The Lone Ranger, as well as episodes of The Adventures of Rin-Tin-Tin and other westerns.

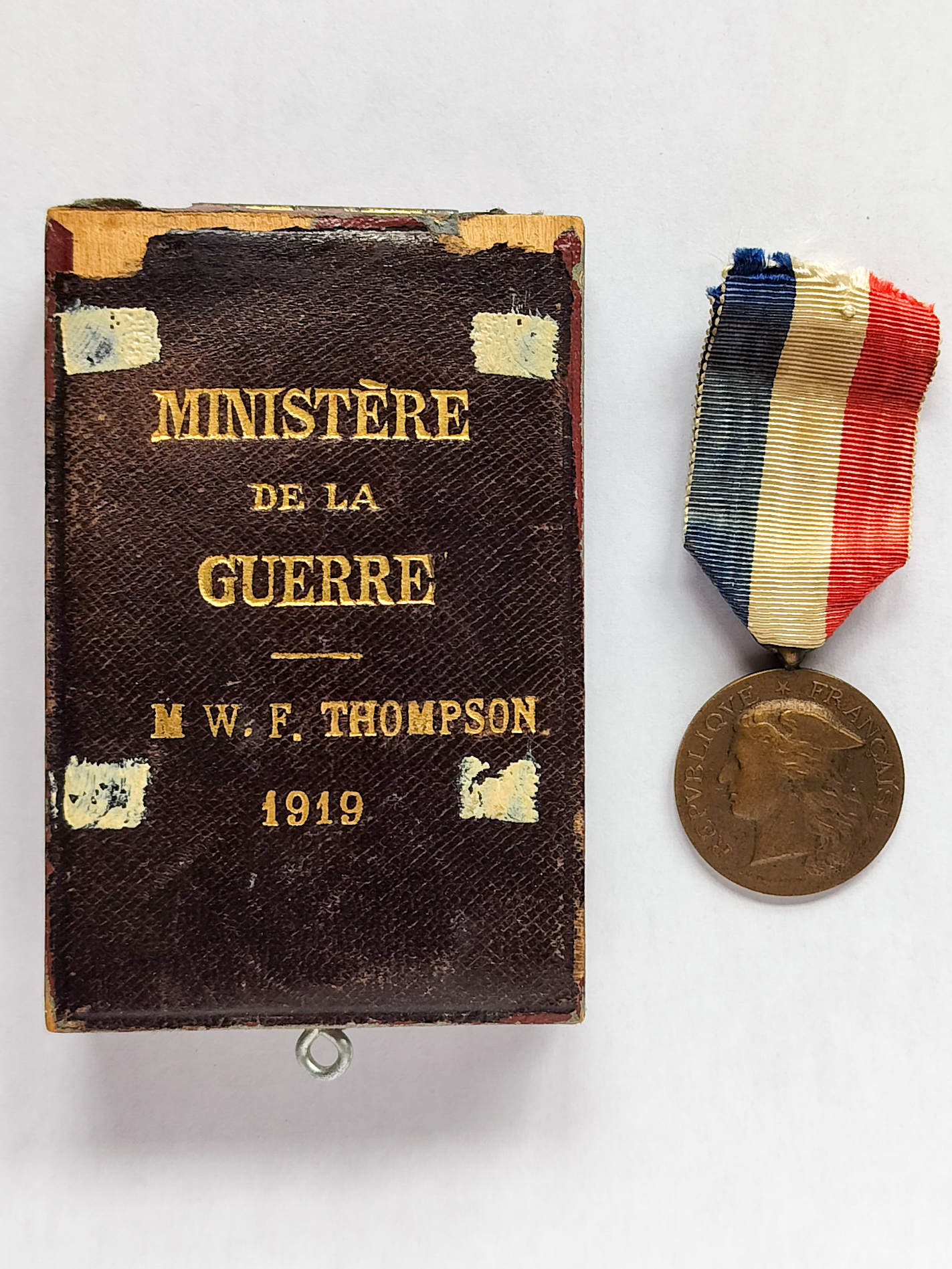
The presentation case and Medal of Honor awarded to William Fawcett Thompson by the French military for his service in WWI.

In 1955, Fawcett was cast in the role of Pete Wilkey, the raspy-voiced combination housekeeper and ranch hand on the western television series Fury. During the series' opening sequence, the narrator states that Fawcett's character, Pete, cut his teeth on a branding iron. In the first episode, "Joey Finds a Friend", Pete says the captured wild stallion was filled with fire and fury, thus giving the horse his name. Fawcett appeared in all 116 episodes of Fury, which was broadcast Saturday mornings on NBC from 1955 through 1960.

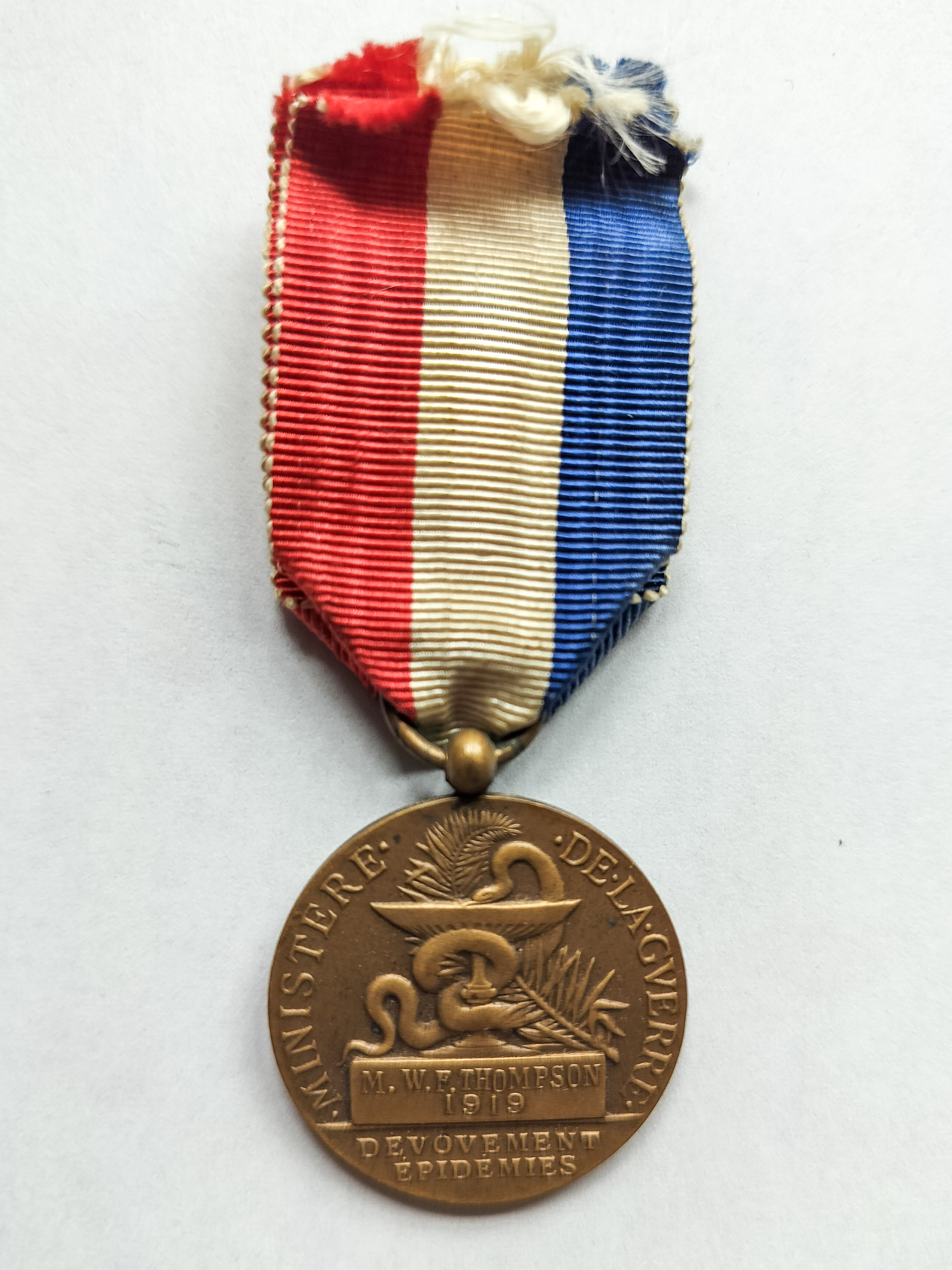
Reverse side of William Fawcett Thompson's Medal

Fawcett also had a starring role in Gene Barry's TV Western Bat Masterson; appeared in a 1961 episode of Maverick titled "Poker Face" starring Jack Kelly; as the town Sheriff in "Six Feet of Gold" (1960 - Season 2 Episode 20) and in Gunsmoke as "Packy" in the 1959 (Season 5 Episode 8) episode "Box of Rocks", as "Turner" in the 1963 episode (Season 9 Episode 8) "Carter Caper", as “Bert Farley” in 1965’s “20 Miles From Dodge” (Season 10 Episode 29), and as "1st Stage Man" in the 1966 (Season 11 Episode 19) episode "The Raid". He appeared on Wanted: Dead or Alive (Season 2 Episode 19: "The Monster") as a gold prospector who escapes a rampaging elephant, trained for crime by Martin Landau's character Khorba. The episode first aired on 1/14/1960.

== Death and burial ==
Fawcett died of cardiovascular disease at age 79 on January 25, 1974, in Sherman Oaks, California. He is buried at Roselawn Cemetery, in Roseville, Minnesota. His grave has a World War I veteran’s marker.

== Selected filmography ==
- Batman and Robin (1949) as Professor Hammil
- The Lone Ranger (1949-1957) (5 episodes)
  - (Season 1 Episode 4: "The Legion of Old Timers") (1949) as Pete
  - (Season 3 Episode 30: "Trouble in Town") (1953) as Bert Gilroy
  - (Season 5 Episode 25: "Dead Eye") (1957) as Marshal 'Dead-Eye' Jones
  - (Season 5 Episode 32: "The Tarnished Star") (1957) as Banker Elias Rush
  - (Season 5 Episode 38: "Blind Witness") (1957) as Tom Ellsworth
- The Gene Autry Show (1951-1954) (13 episodes)
  - (Season 2 Episode 1: "Ghost Town Raiders") (1951) as Crazy Charley
  - (Season 2 Episode 3: "Silver Dollars") (1951) as Sheriff Bailey
  - (Season 2 Episode 10: "The Kid Comes West") (1951) as Frank Graham
  - (Season 2 Episode 16: "Rock River Feud") (1952) as Jim Ford
  - (Season 3 Episode 1: "Thunder Out West") (1953) as Old John Turner
  - (Season 3 Episode 8: "Bandidos") (1953) as Mayor
  - (Season 3 Episode 10: "Cold Decked") (1953) as Game Warden
  - (Season 4 Episode 2: "Johnny Jackeroo") (1954) as Steve Harper, Driver
  - (Season 4 Episode 3: "Holdup") (1954) as Pop Wallace
  - (Season 4 Episode 6: "Talking Guns") (1954) as Jim Dekker
  - (Season 4 Episode 7: "Hoodoo Canyon") (1954) as Hank, Stage Driver
  - (Season 4 Episode 8: "The Carnival Comes West") (1954) as Slim, Carnival Worker
  - (Season 4 Episode 11: "Civil War at Deadwood") (1954) as Muskets Corby
- The Adventures of Kit Carson (1951-1955) (8 episodes)
  - (Season 1 Episode 12: "Fury at Red Gulch") (1951) as Tom Phillips
  - (Season 2 Episode 8: "Powder Smoke Trail") (1952) as Pete the Stableman
  - (Season 2 Episode 19: "Mojave Desperados") (1952) as Trader Bill
  - (Season 3 Episode 11: "Frontier Mail") (1953)
  - (Season 3 Episode 15: "Marshal of Gun Town") (1953) as Jeremy Repp
  - (Season 4 Episode 21: "The Golden Ring of Cibola") (1954)
  - (Season 4 Episode 23: "Devil's Remuda") (1955)
  - (Season 4 Episode 24: "The Phantom Uprising") (1955) as Chris Wheeler
- The Adventures of Wild Bill Hickok (1951-1955) (4 episodes)
  - (Season 1 Episode 4: "The Dog Collar Story") (1951) as Hawkins
  - (Season 3 Episode 8: "Photographer Story") (1952) as Doc Parker
  - (Season 5 Episode 5: "'Ol Pardner Rides Again") (1954)
  - (Season 6 Episode 1: "Outlaw's Portrait") (1955) as Doc Parker
- The Roy Rogers Show (1952-1954) (7 episodes)
  - (Season 1 Episode 5: "The Train Robbery") (1952) as Tom the Banker
  - (Season 1 Episode 10: "Unwilling Outlaw") (1952) as Marty the Banker
  - (Season 1 Episode 13: "Ghost Gulch") (1952) as Cafe Customer
  - (Season 2 Episode 4: "The Feud") (1952) as Grandpa
  - (Season 2 Episode 5: "Go for Your Gun") (1952) as Sam Hanley, Assayer
  - (Season 2 Episode 14: "The Long Chance") (1953) as Seth
  - (Season 4 Episode 10: "Hidden Treasure") (1954) as Lode Turner
- The Cisco Kid (1953-1956) (7 episodes)
  - (Season 3 Episode 21: "The Census Taker") (1953) as Zeke Tobias
  - (Season 4 Episode 6: "Battle of Red Rock Pass") (1953) as John Matlock
  - (Season 4 Episode 13: "Outlaw's Gallery") (1953) as Zack Marsh
  - (Season 4 Episode 22: "Horseless Carriage") (1954) as Scroggins the Banker
  - (Season 5 Episode 26: "The Tumblers") (1955) as Sheriff Len Cooper
  - (Season 6 Episode 21: "He Couldn't Quit") (1956) as Hunt
  - (Season 6 Episode 25: "Magician of Jamesville") (1956) as Grandpa Joe
- The Loretta Young Show (1953-1960) (3 episodes)
  - (Season 1 Episode 10: "Thanksgiving in Beaver Run") (1953) as Station Master
  - (Season 2 Episode 6: "Beyond a Reasonable Doubt") (1954) as Watchman
  - (Season 7 Episode 18: "The Hired Hand") (1960) as Jake
- Death Valley Days (1953-1970) (3 episodes)
  - (Season 1 Episode 10: "The Rival Hash Houses") (1953) as Flapjack Kelly
  - (Season 10 Episode 16: "Feud at Dome Rock") (1962) as Rufe Daniel
  - (Season 18 Episode 16: "The Biggest Little Post Office in the World") (1970) as Hank Stearns
- Duffy's Tavern (1954) (30 episodes) as Clayton
- Public Defender (1954-1955) (3 episodes)
  - (Season 1 Episode 16: "Youth Crime Ring") (1954) as Pops
  - (Season 2 Episode 18: "The Man Who Couldn't Remember") (1954) as Quimby
  - (Season 2 Episode 36: "Clifford Pike") (1955) as James Baldwin
- Annie Oakley (1954-1956) (7 episodes)
  - (Season 1 Episode 5: "Ambush Canyon") (1954) as Jessie Clemmons
  - (Season 1 Episode 13: "The Hardrock Trail") (1954) as Walt, the Telegrapher
  - (Season 1 Episode 21: "Bull's Eye") (1954) as Sam Porter, the Assayer
  - (Season 2 Episode 2: "The Tomboy") (1954) as Tom Jennings
  - (Season 2 Episode 10: "Diablo Doctor") (1955) as Silas Turner
  - (Season 3 Episode 5: "The Robin Hood Kid") (1956) as Gabe Upton
  - (Season 3 Episode 15: "Dilemma at Diablo") (1956) as Sam Briggs
- The Adventures of Rin-Tin-Tin (1954-1957) (6 episodes)
  - (Season 1 Episode 10: "Rin-Tin-Tin and the Ancient Mariner") (1954) as Captain Longey
  - (Season 1 Episode 29: "The Ghost Town") (1955) as George Higgins
  - (Season 2 Episode 10: "Higgins Rides Again") (1955) as Higgins
  - (Season 2 Episode 24: "The Return of the Ancient Mariner") (1956) as Captain Longey
  - (Season 3 Episode 16: "Higgins' Last Stand") (1957) as Marshal George Higgins
  - (Season 4 Episode 2: "The Courtship of Marshal Higgins") (1957) as Marshal George Higgins
- General Electric Theater (1954-1960) (3 episodes)
  - (Season 2 Episode 24: "Desert Crossing") (1954)
  - (Season 3 Episode 32: "Into the Night") (1955) as Farmer Tom
  - (Season 8 Episode 28: "Aftermath") (1960) as Harris
- Lux Video Theatre (1955) (Season 6 Episode 12: "Branded") as Tattoo
- Buffalo Bill, Jr. (1955-1956) (5 episodes)
  - (Season 1 Episode 17: "Lucky Horseshoe") (1955) as Poke Hanna
  - (Season 1 Episode 20: "Legacy of Jesse James") (1955) as Cass Ricketts
  - (Season 1 Episode 22: "The Fight for Texas") (1955) as Corporal Dunbar
  - (Season 2 Episode 9: "Kansas City Lady") (1956) as Banker Taggart
  - (Season 2 Episode 10: "A Diamond for Grandpa") (1956) as Grandpa Andrews
- Fury (1955-1960) (116 episodes) as Pete Wilkey
- Dick Powell's Zane Grey Theatre (1957) (Season 1 Episode 20: "The Necessary Breed") as Petey Feeney
- Whirlybirds (1957) (Season 1 Episode 10: "Lynch Mob") as Virgil Hook
- Matinee Theatre (1957) (Season 2 Episode 122: "A Tongue of Silver") as Willy Figg
- Have Gun – Will Travel (1957) (Season 1 Episode 3: "The Great Mojave Chase") as Jake
- Leave It to Beaver (1957) (Season 1 Episode 8: "Beaver's Crush") as Mr. Johnson
- Dragnet (1957) (Season 7 Episode 14: "The Big Full Moon")
- The Restless Gun (1957-1959) (4 episodes)
  - (Season 1 Episode 9: "The New Sheriff") (1957) as Tom
  - (Season 1 Episode 28: "The Whip") (1958) as Seth
  - (Season 1 Episode 30: "Aunt Emma") (1958) as Doctor
  - (Season 2 Episode 26: "Incident at Bluefield") (1959) as Moss Blaine
- Cheyenne (1957-1961) (4 episodes)
  - (Season 2 Episode 15: "Born Bad") (1957) as Gus Lundy
  - (Season 2 Episode 20: "The Broken Pledge") (1957) as Gib Anders
  - (Season 5 Episode 10: "The Frightened Town") (1961) as Luke
  - (Season 6 Episode 1: "Winchester Quarantine") (1961) as Uncle Rufe
- Tales of Wells Fargo (1957-1962) (4 episodes)
  - (Season 1 Episode 13: "Jesse James") (1957) as Livery Stable Owner
  - (Season 3 Episode 17: "Showdown Trail") (1959) as Conductor
  - (Season 3 Episode 26: "The Legacy") (1959) as Bart Casement / Ed York
  - (Season 6 Episode 20: "Portrait of Teresa") (1962) as Charlie, the Stagecoach Driver
- M Squad (1958) (Season 1 Episode 22: "The Frightened Wife") as Guard
- Sergeant Preston of the Yukon (1958) (Season 3 Episode 22: "The Criminal Collie") as Skagway Bill
- Alcoa Theatre (1958-1959) (2 episodes)
  - (Season 2 Episode 6: "The Town Budget") (1958) as Obie
  - (Season 2 Episode 12: "Man of His House") (1959) as Cookie
- Sugarfoot (1958-1960) (3 episodes)
  - (Season 1 Episode 14: "A Wreath for Charity Lloyd") (1958) as Doc Abercrombie
  - (Season 2 Episode 20: "Wolf") (1959) as Juf Wilkes
  - (Season 4 Episode 2: "A Noose for Nora") (1960) as John Buck
- Wagon Train (1958-1964) (7 episodes)
  - (Season 1 Episode 22: "The Bill Tawnee Story") (1958) as Tucker
  - (Season 3 Episode 35: "The Charlene Brenton Story") (1960) as Shotgun Rider
  - (Season 5 Episode 7: "The Artie Matthewson Story") (1961) as Stableman
  - (Season 5 Episode 34: "The Frank Carter Story") (1962) as Tapper
  - (Season 6 Episode 10: "The John Bernard Story") (1962) as Matthew Budgeon
  - (Season 6 Episode 16: "The Abel Weatherly Story") (1963) as Drifter
  - (Season 7 Episode 27: "The Whipping") (1964) as Finley
- Wanted: Dead or Alive (1959-1960) (2 episodes)
  - (Season 1 Episode 34: "Littlest Client") (1959) as Hardrock Johnson
  - (Season 2 Episode 19: "The Monster") (1960) as Prospector
- Peter Gunn (1959-1961) (2 episodes)
  - (Season 1 Episode 23: "The Dirty Word") (1959) as Fuzzy Crane
  - (Season 3 Episode 23: "Portrait in Leather") (1961) as Sobey Webb
- Maverick (1959-1962) (2 episodes)
  - (Season 2 Episode 16: "Gun-Shy") (1959) as Farmer Ames
  - (Season 5 Episode 6: "Poker Face") (1962) as Stallion
- Lawman (1959-1962) (6 episodes)
  - (Season 1 Episode 19: "Warpath") (1959) as Billy Bright
  - (Season 2 Episode 37: "Fast Trip to Cheyenne") (1960) as Charlie Greer
  - (Season 3 Episode 5: "The Return of Owny O'Reilly") (1960) as Haberdasher Jenkins
  - (Season 4 Episode 8: "The Catalog Woman") (1961) as John, Townsman
  - (Season 4 Episode 24: "The Barber") (1962) as Ed Carruthers
  - (Season 4 Episode 28: "Mountain Man") (1962) as Ed Carruthers
- 77 Sunset Strip (1959-1963) (4 episodes)
  - (Season 1 Episode 18: "Conspiracy of Silence") (1959) as Park Security Guard
  - (Season 2 Episode 16: "Switchburg") (1960) as Morty Genes
  - (Season 3 Episode 29: "Old Card Sharps Never Die") (1961) as Notch McConnell
  - (Season 5 Episode 19: "Six Feet Under") (1963) as Whiskers
- Gunsmoke (1959-1970) (9 episodes)
  - (Season 5 Episode 13: "Box of Rocks") (1959) as Packy
  - (Season 8 Episode 23: "Ash") (1963) as Hawkins
  - (Season 9 Episode 8: "Carter Caper") (1963) as Turner
  - (Season 10 Episode 9: "Jonah Hutchinson") (1964) as Lefferts
  - (Season 10 Episode 29: "Twenty Miles from Dodge") (1965) as Bert Fraley
  - (Season 11 Episode 19: "The Raid: Part 2") (1966) as First Stage Man
  - (Season 15 Episode 6: "A Man Called 'Smith'") (1969) as Old Prospector
  - (Season 15 Episode 17: "The Judas Gun") (1970) as Liveryman
  - (Season 16 Episode 2: "The Noose") (1970) as Nebs
- Bat Masterson (1960) (Season 2 Episode 20: "Six Feet of Gold") as Sheriff
- Laramie (1960-1962) (7 episodes)
  - (Season 1 Episode 20: "Death Wind") (1960) as Ben
  - (Season 2 Episode 8: ".45 Calibre") (1960) as Ben
  - (Season 2 Episode 9: "License to Kill") (1960) as Ben
  - (Season 2 Episode 16: "Killer Without Cause") (1961) as Ben
  - (Season 3 Episode 25: "The Replacement") (1962) as Bartender
  - (Season 4 Episode 7: "The Sunday Shoot") (1962) as Bill
  - (Season 4 Episode 11: "Time of the Traitor") (1962) as Josh
- Bonanza (1960-1970) (6 episodes)
  - (Season 2 Episode 6: "Denver McKee") (1960) as Pete Redfern
  - (Season 5 Episode 8: "Journey Remembered") (1963) as Tulliver
  - (Season 5 Episode 28: "A Pink Cloud Comes from Old Cathay") (1964) as Rafe
  - (Season 8 Episode 29: "A Man Without Land") (1967) as Jake Johnson
  - (Season 9 Episode 12: "Check Rein") (1967) as Asa
  - (Season 12 Episode 1: "The Night Virginia City Died") (1970) as Whiskey Smith
- The Untouchables (1961) (Season 2 Episode 18: "The Underground Court") as Cooley
- Mister Ed (1961) (Season 1 Episode 8: "Pageant Show") as Dr. Connors
- The New Breed (1961) (Season 1 Episode 10: "The Valley of the Three Charlies") as Old Charlie
- Dr. Kildare (1961) (2 episodes)
  - (Season 1 Episode 2: "Immunity") as Cox
  - (Season 1 Episode 13: "Season to Be Jolly") as Charlie
- The Rifleman (1961-1963) (2 episodes)
  - (Season 3 Episode 23: "The Lost Treasure of Canyon Town") (1961) as Mr. Newman
  - (Season 5 Episode 15: "Suspicion") (1963) as Pyrtie Rand
- The Twilight Zone (1962) (Season 3 Episode 23: "The Last Rites of Jeff Myrtlebank") as Reverend Siddons
- Ben Casey (1962) (Season 1 Episode 26: "Among Others, a Girl Named Abilene") as Claude
- Stoney Burke (1963) (Season 1 Episode 17: "A Matter of Percentage") as Desk Clerk
- Perry Mason (1963-1964) (2 episodes)
  - (Season 6 Episode 14: "The Case of the Bluffing Blast") (1963) as Mr. Morescu
  - (Season 7 Episode 13: "The Case of the Wednesday Woman") (1964) as Pawn Broker
- Temple Houston (1963-1964) (2 episodes)
  - (Season 1 Episode 3: "Letter of the Law") (1963)
  - (Season 1 Episode 18: "Sam's Boy") (1964) as Billy Rogers
- The Virginian (1963-1970) (9 episodes)
  - (Season 1 Episode 21: "The Small Parade") (1963) as Rider
  - (Season 2 Episode 2: "To Make This Place Remember") (1963) as Jethro
  - (Season 3 Episode 10: "Return a Stranger") (1964) as Sam Elberry
  - (Season 4 Episode 18: "Long Ride to Wind River") (1966) as Gabe Chapman
  - (Season 5 Episode 10: "High Stakes") (1966) as Hostler
  - (Season 6 Episode 19: "Gentle Tamers") (1968) as Telegrapher
  - (Season 6 Episode 26: "Seth") (1968) as Station Master
  - (Season 7 Episode 14: "Stopover") (1969) as Clem
  - (Season 9 Episode 12: "Last of the Comancheros") (1970) as Hostler
- The Alfred Hitchcock Hour (1964) (Season 2 Episode 24: "The Gentleman Caller") as Junk Collector
- Daniel Boone (1964-1967) (3 episodes)
  - (Season 1 Episode 8: "A Short Walk to Salem") (1964) as Ben Pickens
  - (Season 2 Episode 13: "Perilous Journey") (1965) as Salem Innkeeper
  - (Season 3 Episode 27: "Take the Southbound Stage") (1967) as Gunsmith
- Petticoat Junction (1965) (Season 2 Episode 30: "Who's Afraid of the Big Bad Jinx?") as Pip Winslow
- Kraft Suspense Theatre (1965) (Season 2 Episode 29: "Kill Me on July 20 (1965)") as Mr. Robinson
- Bob Hope Presents the Chrysler Theatre (1965) (Season 2 Episode 16: "Terror Island") as Fisherman
- The Big Valley (1965-1968) (3 episodes)
  - (Season 1 Episode 9: "Earthquake") (1965) as Jeb
  - (Season 2 Episode 17: "Image of Yesterday") (1967) as Old Man
  - (Season 4 Episode 5: "Deathtown") (1968) as Coon
- Jesse James Meets Frankenstein's Daughter (1966) as Jensen, the Pharmacist
- The Munsters (1966) (Season 2 Episode 30: "Herman's Sorority Caper") as Janitor
- The Wild Wild West (1966) (Season 1 Episode 27: "The Night of the Murderous Spring") as Man
- Lassie (1967) (Season 13 Episode 30: "Trapped") as Charlie
- The Guns of Will Sonnett (1967-1969) (2 episodes)
  - (Season 1 Episode 17: "The Hero") (1967) as Gilliam, the Manager
  - (Season 2 Episode 15: "Robber's Roost") (1969) as Tom Darvin
- I Dream of Jeannie (1968) (Season 3 Episode 19: "Genie, Genie, Who's Got the Genie?: Part 4") as Gas Station Attendant
- Mannix (1968-1970) (2 episodes)
  - (Season 2 Episode 4: "To the Swiftest, Death") (1968) as Janitor
  - (Season 3 Episode 15: "Walk with a Dead Man") (1970) as Desk Clerk
- Adam-12 (1970) (Season 2 Episode 12: "Log 43: Hostage") as Stony
- The Wonderful World of Disney (1970) (2 episodes) as Elmer the Old Farmer
  - (Season 17 Episode 2: "The Boy Who Stole the Elephant: Part 1")
  - (Season 17 Episode 3: "The Boy Who Stole the Elephant: Part 2")
