= The Black Orchid (film) =

1959 film by Martin Ritt

- Theatrical release poster
- Directed by: Martin Ritt
- Screenplay by: Joseph Stefano
- Produced by: Marcello Girosi; Carlo Ponti
- Starring: Sophia Loren; Anthony Quinn; Mark Richman; Ina Balin
- Cinematography: Robert Burks
- Edited by: Howard A. Smith
- Music by: Alessandro Cicognini
- Production company: Paramount Pictures
- Distributed by: Paramount Pictures
- Release date: February 12, 1959
- Running time: 96 minutes
- Country: United States
- Language: English
- Box office: $1 million (est. US/ Canada rentals)

The Black Orchid is a 1959 American drama film directed by Martin Ritt and starring Sophia Loren and Anthony Quinn. Supporting actors include Peter Mark Richman, Virginia Vincent, Frank Puglia, Jimmy Baird, Naomi Stevens, Whit Bissell and Ina Balin.

== Plot ==
Rose Bianco (Sophia Loren), a florist widowed by a famous gangster, looks for happiness with widower Frank Valente (Anthony Quinn). Rose is dealing with her son Ralph in a work farm for troubled boys. Ralph is warned that if he runs away one more time he will be sent to reform school.

Frank has a grown up daughter and only child Mary (Ina Balin), who takes care of everything for him. Mary is in love with a man named Noble, and they are engaged, but Mary hesitates to marry him because she is worried about who will take care of her father. She asks Noble to marry her and then stay with her in her father's house, but Noble wishes to purchase a house near the location of his business in Atlantic City as he is tired of commuting. At the same time, Mary refuses to accept her father's sweetheart Rose as her stepmother and allow her to join the family. Before Frank's wedding day, Mary irons Frank's clothes, cooks all the food and locks herself in her room. As Frank's wife suffered from serious depression and mental illness after the birth of Mary, Frank fears that his late wife's mental illness has been inherited by his daughter. This leads Rose and Frank to call everything off, devastating them both.

Meanwhile, Rose has taken Frank to visit her son Ralph at the work farm. It is agreed when Frank and Rose marry, Ralph will be released into their custody. When Rose's son finds out the wedding has been cancelled and he will not be able to leave, he runs away from the work farm, leading the police to come and search for him in the house. The next day, Noble comes and sees Frank is sleeping in his chair; Mary has still confined herself in upstairs. He asks her to come out, but there is no answer. The two men agree their only hope is to pray together. Noble decides he will drop Frank off at Rose's house and will wait at the church for him. Frank finds out that Rose is waiting beside the telephone for news about Ralph and reveals how miserable he is, torn between her and his daughter.

Frank leaves and joins Noble in the church and Rose heads for Frank's house to confront Mary. Her son comes to the church, hoping to see his mother one last time before they send him to reform school. Frank and Noble bring him back to the farm and manage an agreement with the boarding manager, Mr. Harmon. On the other hand, thinking herself alone in the house, Mary unlocks the door and comes out of the room. There she meets Rose, who has decided to try to help Frank find happiness, even if it is not with her. Rose argues her point with Mary and makes her understand Rose's love for her father, and finally Mary accepts her, asking her to stay for coffee. Frank, Rose, Noble, and Mary have breakfast together. In the end, Rose and Frank take Ralph out of the work farm and the three happily walk toward the horizon.

== Cast ==
- Sophia Loren as Rose Bianco
- Anthony Quinn as Frank Valente
- Mark Richman as Noble
- Virginia Vincent as Alma Gallo
- Frank Puglia as Henry Gallo
- Jimmy Baird as Ralph Bianco
- Naomi Stevens as Giulia Gallo
- Whit Bissell as Mr. Harmon
- Ina Balin as Mary Valente
- Majel Barrett as Luisa (uncredited)

== Production ==
The Black Orchid's original title was The Flower Maker.

=== Casting ===
The Black Orchid was originally purchased by Paramount Pictures with the intent of having Anna Magnani in the lead role, however, with her schedule so busy and the hiring of producer Carlo Ponti, Ponti hired his wife Sophia Loren. She was paid $225,000.

Filming began February 1958. Ritt called Loren "a terrific lady. I enjoyed making it, it was an easy film to make. Tony [Quinn] and she were terrific together. I didn't have any illusions about the film."

=== Soundtrack ===
The Black Orchid is the first Hollywood film of Italian composer Alessandro Cicognini released by Dot Records.

== Novelization ==
A novelization of the screenplay was written by American author Edward S. Aarons (1916–1975) under the pseudonym Edward S. Ronns.

== Reception ==
=== Critical response ===
The staff at Variety wrote in their review: "Orchid has a flavor of Marty, a touch of Wild Is the Wind. The story threads and changing emotions are securely locked in through Martin Ritt’s honest direction. Without pushing, he tells an intricately drawn story with a smooth, authoritative hand." Film critic Bosley Crowther of The New York Times wrote in his review: "When anyone gives his director what Mr. Quinn gives Martin Ritt, it is certainly too bad that the director hasn't something equally good to give back to him. But, unfortunately, Joseph Stefano, who wrote the original script, did not put into the hands of the director a story that is up to Mr. Quinn."

For her performance in the film, Sophia Loren won the Coppa Volpi for best actress at the Venice International Film Festival.

=== Release ===
The Black Orchid was released in theatres on February 12, 1959. The film was released on DVD on August 31, 2004, by Paramount Home Entertainment.

== See also ==
- List of American films of 1959
