= The New Adventures of Charlie Chan =

American syndicated TV mystery series (1957–1958)

- Genre: Crime drama
- Directed by: Leslie Arliss; Charles Bennett; Don Chaffey; Charles F. Haas; Alvin Rakoff
- Starring: J. Carrol Naish; James Hong
- Composer: Emil Newman
- Countries of origin: United States; United Kingdom
- Original language: English
- No. of seasons: 1
- No. of episodes: 39

Production
- Executive producer: Leon Fromkess
- Producers: Rudolph C. Flothow; Sidney Marshall
- Camera setup: Single-camera
- Running time: 25 mins.
- Production companies: Vision Productions (episodes 1–5); ITC Entertainment; Television Programs of America

Original release
- Network: Syndication
- Release: June 1957 – 1958

Related
- The Sky Dragon; The Amazing Chan and the Chan Clan; The Return of Charlie Chan

The New Adventures of Charlie Chan is a crime drama series that aired in the United States in syndicated television from June 1957 to 1958. The first five episodes were made by Vision Productions in the United States, before production switched to the United Kingdom under ITC Entertainment and Television Programs of America.

== Overview ==
The series, consisting of 39 half-hour monochrome episodes, follows the investigations of the fictional detective Charlie Chan, created by Earl Derr Biggers in 1925. The series follows the convention, established in the Charlie Chan films, of having the Asian character Chan played by a Western actor while his son(s) were played by actual Asians.

James Hong, who played Number One Son, said J. Carrol Naish had him fired from the show after Naish took against him for missing a line in rehearsal and said "What do you think this is? A school for Chinese actors?", which Hong ascribed to Naish having a 'deep prejudice'. he said Naish held an ultimatum of either Hong or himself leaving.

== Cast ==
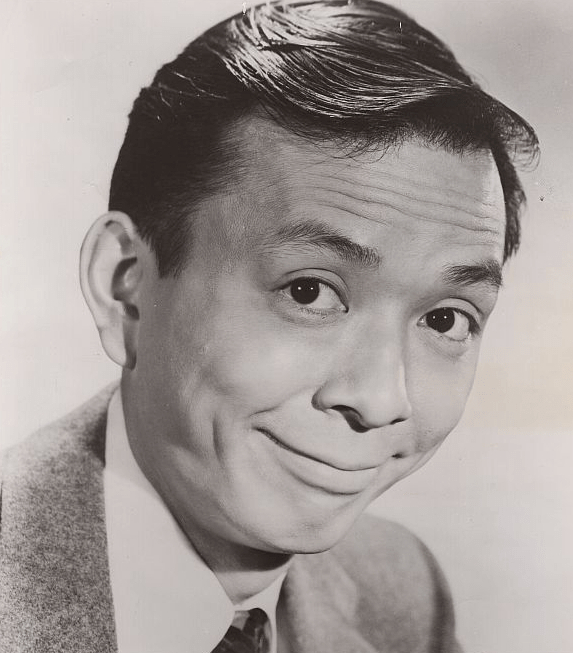
Hong as Barry Chan, 1958

=== Main ===
- J. Carrol Naish as Charlie Chan
- James Hong as Barry Chan, "Number One Son"

=== Guest stars ===
Guest stars, most notably under ITC, include:

- Honor Blackman
- Southern Television chief announcer Brian Nissen
- Patrick Troughton

== Episode list ==
=== Season 1 ===
This list appears to be in production order. The first five episodes were filmed in the US by Vision, the remaining episodes in the UK by ITC.

1. "Your Money or Your Wife"
2. "Secret of the Sea"
3. "The Lost Face"
4. "Blind Man's Bluff"
5. "The Great Salvos"
6. "The Counterfeiters"
7. "The Death of a Don"
8. "Charlie's Highland Fling"
9. "The Patient in Room 21"
10. "The Rajput Ruby"
11. "The Final Curtain"
12. "Death at High Tide"
13. "The Circle of Fear"
14. "An Exhibit in Wax"
15. "Backfire"
16. "Patron of the Arts"
17. "A Hamlet in Flames"
18. "Dateline: Execution"
19. "The Sweater"
20. "The Noble Art of Murder"
21. "Three Men on a Raft"
22. "No Holiday for Murder"
23. "No Future for Frederick"
24. "Safe Deposit"
25. "Voodoo Death"
26. "The Expatriate" (aka "Ex-Patriot")
27. "The Airport Murder Case"
28. "The Hand of Hera Dass"
29. "The Chippendale Racket"
30. "The Invalid"
31. "The Man in the Wall"
32. "Something Old, Something New"
33. "The Man with 100 Faces"
34. "The Point of No Return"
35. "A Bowl By Cellini"
36. "Without Fear"
37. "Kidnap"
38. "Rhyme or Treason"
39. "Three for One"

== Comic book ==
DC Comics published a six-issue comic adaptation from June 1958 to April 1959, written by John Broome and drawn by Sid Greene.
