= Cody of the Pony Express =

1950 film by Spencer Gordon Bennet

- Theatrical release poster
- Directed by: Spencer Gordon Bennet (as Spencer Bennet)
- Screenplay by: David Mathews; Lewis Clay; Charles R. Condon
- Story by: George H. Plympton; Joseph F. Poland
- Produced by: Sam Katzman
- Starring: Jock O'Mahoney; Dickie Moore; Peggy Stewart; William Fawcett
- Cinematography: Ira H. Morgan
- Edited by: Earl Turner
- Color process: Black and white
- Production company: Sam Katzman Productions
- Distributed by: Columbia Pictures
- Release date: April 6, 1950
- Running time: 270 minutes (15 episodes)
- Country: United States
- Language: English

Cody of the Pony Express is a 1950 American Western serial film directed by Spencer Gordon Bennet. It starred Jock Mahoney, Dickie Moore, Peggy Stewart and William Fawcett.

== Plot ==
The plot centers on a young Cody who joins forces with Lieutenant Jim Archer to battle an outlaw gang secretly led by Mortimer Black, an unscrupulous lawyer driven by greed into committing a series of crimes, including murder.

== Cast ==
- Jock Mahoney as Lt. Jim Archer (as Jock O'Mahoney)
- Dickie Moore as Bill Cody
- Peggy Stewart as Linda Graham
- William Fawcett as Erza Graham
- Tom London as Doc Laramie
- Helena Dare as Ma Graham
- George J. Lewis as Mortimer Black
- Pierce Lyden as Slim Randall [Chs.4-15]
- Jack Ingram as Pecos [Chs.1-7]
- Rick Vallin as Henchman Denver [Chs.1-4]
- Frank Ellis as Durk - Henchman [Chs.1,2,4,8-10,12-15]
- Ross Elliott as Irv - Henchman
- Ben Corbett as Henchman Eric Mason
- Rusty Wescoatt as Denver - Hired Gunman [Ch.14]

== Production ==
Cody of the Pony Express was filmed on locations in Pioneertown, California.

Cody of the Pony Express was the last serial with a boy in the title role (in this case as the young Buffalo Bill/William F. Cody).

== Chapter titles ==
1. Cody Carries the Mail
2. Captured by Indians
3. Cody Saves a Life
4. Cody Follows a Trail
5. Cody to the Rescue
6. The Fatal Arrow
7. Cody Gets His Man
8. Renegade Raiders
9. Frontier Law
10. Cody Tempts Fate
11. Trouble at Silver Gap
12. Cody Comes Through
13. Marshal of Nugget City
14. Unseen Danger
15. Cody's Last Ride

_{Source:}
