= Television Programs of America =

American television production company

Television Programs of America, Inc (TPA) was a New York-based US television production company in the 1950s. TPA had a Canadian subsidiary, Normandie Productions.

This television production and distribution company was best known for Fury, King of the Wild Stallions (1955-1960).

The company was created in 1952 as a partnership between Chicago lawyer (movie financing) Milton Gordon and film producers Edward Small and Leon Fromkess.

The company often worked in association with the British production and distribution company ITC and its sister ITV company Associated TeleVision.

TPA also worked with Jack Wrather's companies Wrather-Alvarez Broadcasting, later Jack Wrather Productions, which held the rights to Lassie and The Lone Ranger.

In September 1958, Independent Television Corporation (a joint venture of Jack Wrather and the British Incorporated Television Company (ITC) purchased TPA for $11,350,000. Wrather later (1960?) sold his shares of Independent Television Corporation to ITC.

== Programs ==
TPA and Normandie productions included:

- Fury (A black stallion and his boy owner)
- The Adventures of Tugboat Annie with the UK's Associated-Rediffusion
- Hawkeye and the Last of the Mohicans with ITC
- Cannonball with ITC
- The New Adventures of Charlie Chan with ITC
- Ramar of the Jungle
- The Count of Monte Cristo with ITC
- New York Confidential with ITC
