= Blood on the Arrow =

1964 film

- Theatrical release poster
- Directed by: Sidney Salkow
- Written by: Mark Hanna (story); Robert E. Kent (screenplay)
- Produced by: Sam Firks
- Starring: Dale Robertson; Martha Hyer; Wendell Corey; Dandy Curran
- Cinematography: Kenneth Peach
- Edited by: William Austin
- Music by: Richard LaSalle; André Previn
- Distributed by: Allied Artists
- Release date: October 11, 1964
- Running time: 91 mins
- Country: United States
- Language: English

Blood on the Arrow is a 1964 Western film directed by Sidney Salkow and written by Mark Hanna and starring Dale Robertson and Martha Hyer. The plot is about the sole survivor of an Apache ambush, who rides out to save a young boy who has been captured.

== Plot ==
A U.S. Cavalry patrol including prisoner Wade Cooper (Dale Robertson) is ambushed as they are crossing the territory of Arizona by the Coyotero, a savage Indian tribe of the Apache nation. All are killed except Cooper who is left for dead. He wanders across the wasteland and is found near collapse by Nancy Mailer (Martha Hyer) who brings him to the Trading Post run by her husband, Clint Mailer (Wendell Corey). Mailer recognized Cooper as a hunted man with a price on his head, and refuses to assist in his recovery from wounds until his wife convinces him that he will die unless given medical attention. Mailer who has discovered a rich vein of gold and is resolved to go to any length to protect his find, is now blind with suspicion, both over the gold and jealousy of his wife, with Cooper at the Post.

As the tensions mount amongst the three, a Coyotero raid traps them and takes Mailers son, Tim (Dandy Curran) and holds him as hostage with the understanding that Mailer will deliver hundreds of rifles within seven days to the Indians for their continued warfare against the white man. Clint Mailer leaves to get the rifles and in the interim, Cooper and Nancy Mailer are drawn closer together with the revelation that Tim is not the son of Mailer. Mailer returns without rifles. Cooper then executes a plan involving the stealing of the rifles from the army post, placing them in the gold mine carefully leaving the mine booby trapped. The mine is blown up as the Indians approach it, Tim is rescued, Cooper and Nancy escape and set out to start a new life with Tim.

== Cast ==
- Dale Robertson as Wade Cooper
- Martha Hyer as Nancy Mailer
- Wendell Corey as Clint Mailer
- Dandy Curran as Tim Mailer
- Paul Mantee as Segura
- Robert Carricart as Kai-La
- Ted de Corsia as Jud
- Elisha Cook Jr as Tex
- John Matthews as Mike
- Tom Reese as Charlie
- Boyce Wright as Capt. Stanhope
- Michael Hammond as Lieutenant
- Leland Wainscott as Sentry

== Production ==
The film was the second of five films Leon Fromkess was making for Allied Artists, the first being Shock Corridor. The original director was to be Burt Kennedy. Kennedy was replaced by Sidney Salkow. Filming started on 5 May 1964.
