= Robert Christian =

American actor (1939–1983)

- Born: December 27, 1939; Los Angeles, California, U.S.
- Died: January 27, 1983 (age 43); New York City, U.S.
- Occupation: Actor
- Years active: 1960–1982

Robert Christian (December 27, 1939 – January 27, 1983) was an American actor.

== Early life and education ==
Christian was born in Los Angeles, United States, and began acting as a child, appearing on Amos 'n' Andy and The Andy Griffith Show. He later moved to New York and studied at the Actors Studio with Lee Strasberg.

== Career ==
Christian was a member of the Negro Ensemble Company and appeared in numerous stage productions, winning an Obie Award in 1976 for his performance in Athol Fugard's Blood Knot at the Manhattan Theater Club. Christian appeared as Detective Bob Morgan on Another World from January to December 1982.

== Personal life ==
Christian left Another World before he died of cancerous complications of AIDS in January 1983.

== Filmography ==
=== Film ===
Year	Title	Role	Notes
1962	Airborne	Pvt. 'Rocky' Laymon	
1964	The Patsy	Barbershop Porter	Uncredited
1968	Funny Girl	Messenger	Uncredited
1971	Some of My Best Friends Are...	Eric	
1979	The Seduction of Joe Tynan	Arthur Briggs	
1979	...And Justice for All	Ralph Agee	
1979	Coriolanus	Tullus Aufidius	
1981	Bustin' Loose	Donald	
1981	Prince of the City	The King	

=== Television ===
Year	Title	Role	Notes
1960, 1961	Lock-Up	Carl Norwood / Duke Joyce	2 episodes
1960, 1961	Sea Hunt	Charlie / USCG Radio Operator	2 episodes
1976	Search for Tomorrow	Lieutenant Frank	9 episodes
1978	King	Wallace	3 episodes
1978	Roll of Thunder, Hear My Cry	David Logan	Television film
1982	Muggable Mary, Street Cop	Joe Bell	Television film
1982	Another World	Bob Morgan	8 episodes
1984	Piaf	Marcel	Television film; posthumous release
