= Duffy's Tavern =

American radio sitcom

Sam Berman's caricature of Ed Gardner as the bartender Archie on Duffy's Tavern was published in NBC's 1947 book promoting the network's top stars.

Duffy's Tavern is an American radio sitcom that ran for a decade on several networks (CBS, 1941–42; NBC-Blue Network, 1942–44; and NBC, 1944–51), concluding with the December 28, 1951, broadcast.

The program often featured celebrity guest stars but always hooked them around the misadventures of Archie, the tavern's manager, portrayed by Ed Gardner. Archie was prone to involvement in get-rich-quick schemes and romantic missteps, and constantly communicated with malaprops and mixed metaphors. Gardner had performed the character of Archie, talking about Duffy's Tavern, as early as November 9, 1939, when he appeared on NBC's Good News of 1940.

== Characters and story ==
In the early 1940s, Gardner worked as a director, writer, and producer for radio programs. In 1941, he created a character for This Is New York, a program that he was producing. The character, which Gardner played, became Archie of Duffy's Tavern.

In the familiar opening, "When Irish Eyes Are Smiling," performed either solo on an old-sounding piano or by a larger orchestra, is interrupted by the ring of a telephone and Gardner's New Yorkese accent as he answers, "Hello, Duffy's Tavern, where the elite meet to eat. Archie the manager speakin'. Duffy ain't here—oh, hello, Duffy."

Owner Duffy was never heard nor seen, either on the radio program or in the 1945 film adaptation or the short-lived 1954 TV series. Archie constantly bantered with Duffy's man-crazy daughter, Miss Duffy, played by several actresses, beginning with Gardner's real-life first wife, Shirley Booth, followed by Florence Halop and, later, by actress Hazel Shermet, and especially with Clifton Finnegan (Charlie Cantor, later Sid Raymond), a likeable soul with several screws loose and a knack for falling for every other salesman's scam. Eddie the Waiter was played by Eddie Green. The pianist Fats Pichon took over the role after Green's death in 1950.

Hoping to take advantage of the income-tax-free status of Puerto Rico, Gardner moved Duffy's Tavern there in 1949. Unfortunately, many guest personalities declined to make the journey to appear on the show and it eventually went off the air in 1951.

== Guest stars ==
The series featured many high-profile guest stars, including Fred Allen, Mel Allen, Lucille Ball, Joan Bennett, Nigel Bruce, Billie Burke, Bing Crosby, Gracie Fields, Rex Harrison, Susan Hayward, Bob Hope, Lena Horne, Boris Karloff, Alan Ladd, Veronica Lake, Peggy Lee, Peter Lorre, Tony Martin, Marie McDonald, Vincent Price, Gene Tierney, Arthur Treacher, and Shelley Winters. As the series progressed, Archie slipped in and out of a variety of quixotic, self-imploding plotlines—from writing an opera to faking a fortune to marry an heiress. Such situations mattered less than did the clever depiction of earthbound-but-dreaming New York life and its individualistic, often bizarre characters.

Duffy's Tavern was Gardner's creation, and he oversaw its writing intently, drawing also on his earlier experience as a successful radio director. His directing credits included stints for George Burns and Gracie Allen, Ripley's Believe It or Not, and The Rudy Vallee Hour. Gardner also brought aboard several keen writing talents, including theatrical humorist Abe Burrows (the show's co-creator and head writer for its first five years), future M*A*S*H writer Larry Gelbart, and Dick Martin, who later was the co-host of television's groundbreaking Rowan and Martin's Laugh-In.

== Title changes ==
Early in the show's life, however, its name, Duffy's Tavern, was changed—first to Duffy's and then, for four episodes, to Duffy's Variety. An employee for Bristol-Myers—whose Ipana toothpaste was the show's early sponsor—persuaded the company's publicity director to demand the name change because the original title promoted "the hobby of drinking" too much for certain sensibilities. Bristol-Myers eventually admitted the employee had little to go on other than a handful of protesting letters, and—to the delight of fans who never stopped using the original name anyway—the original title was restored permanently. The name change was often subverted by the Armed Forces Radio Network. When the AFRN rebroadcast those episodes for U.S. servicemen during World War II, the announcer referred to Duffy's Tavern.

== Film and television ==
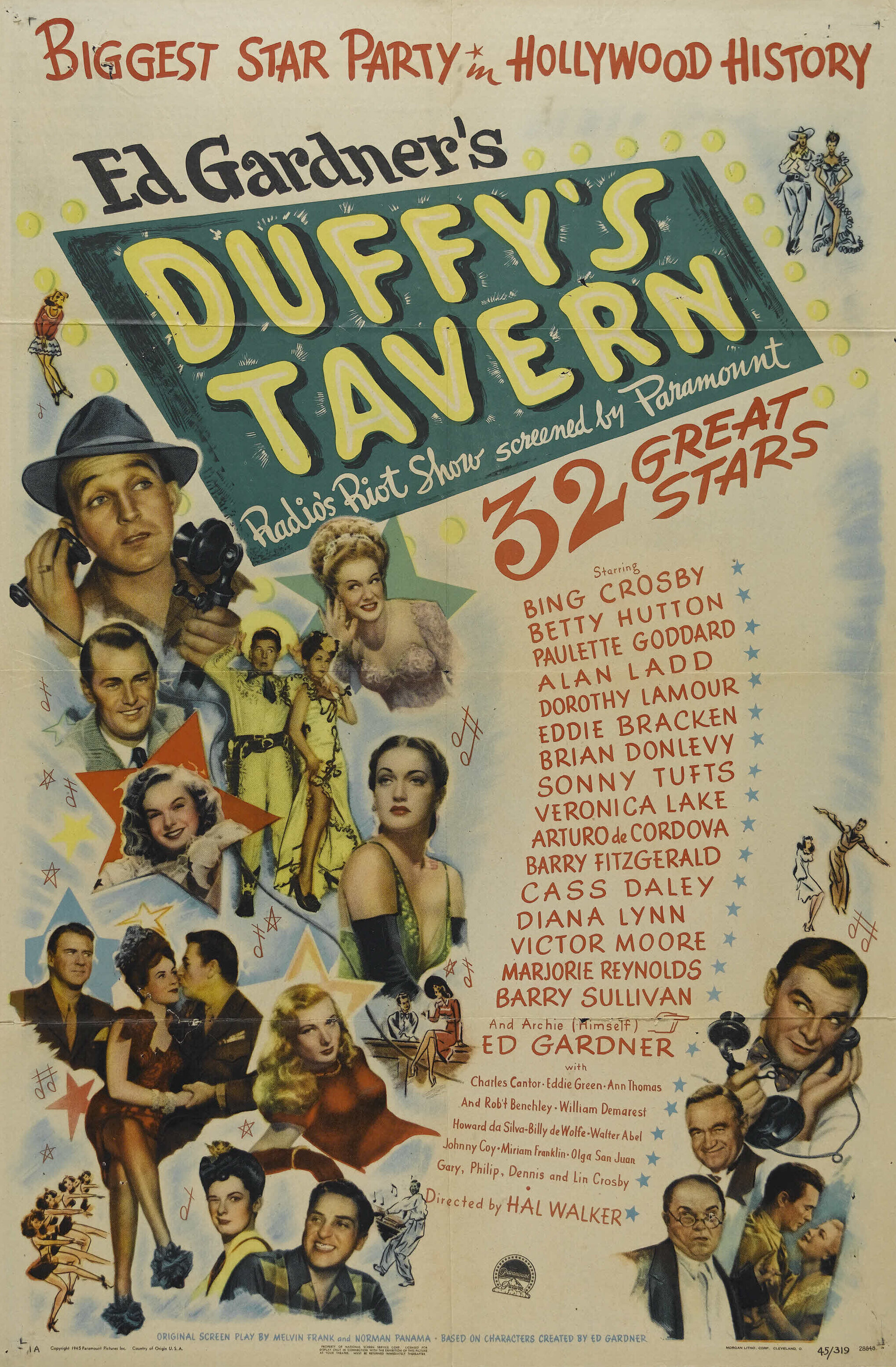
Poster for the Duffy's Tavern movie

Burrows and Matt Brooks collaborated on the screenplay for the 1945 film, Ed Gardner's Duffy's Tavern, in which Archie (with regulars Eddie and Finnegan) was surrounded by a throng of Paramount Pictures stars playing themselves, including Robert Benchley, William Bendix, Eddie Bracken, Bing Crosby, Cass Daley, Brian Donlevy, Paulette Goddard, Betty Hutton, Alan Ladd, Veronica Lake and Dorothy Lamour. The film's plot involves a war-displaced record manufacturer whose staff—those not sent off to war—drown their sorrows at Duffy's on credit, while the company owner tries to find ways around the price controls and war attrition that threaten to put him out of business.

The 1954 syndicated TV series, co-produced by Hal Roach Jr., lacked leading name guest stars.

== British remake ==
Broadcast on the BBC Light Programme from 4 July to 29 August 1956, Finkel's Café was written by Denis Norden and Frank Muir, and produced by Pat Dixon. It starred Peter Sellers and Sid James. Avril Angers and Kenneth Connor were regulars and guest stars included Gilbert Harding.

== Influence ==
As a result of the radio program's popularity, dozens of bars and inns across the country adopted the name, such as Duffy's Tavern in Holmes Beach, Florida.

Duffy's Tavern has inspired references in popular culture formats:

- Archie Bunker's Place, the low-keyed spinoff from the groundbreaking All in the Family, which moved the now-title character from the loading dock and the taxicab to running a blue-collar bar with his usual repertoire of malaprops.
- The soap opera Ryan's Hope (whose title family oriented around tavern-owning Irish parents).
- The 1980s situation comedy Cheers (co-created by James Burrows, the son of Duffy's Tavern co-creator Abe Burrows).
- Jackie Gleason's "Joe the Bartender" sketches. These usually began with Joe (Gleason) in a conversation with an unseen patron, Mr. Dennehy, before being joined (usually at Dennehy's request) by a Finnegan-like, cheerful dolt, Crazy Guggenheim (Frank Fontaine).
- One of the regular cartoon sequences from The Quick Draw McGraw Show (produced by Hanna-Barbera between 1959 and 1962) was called Snooper and Blabber, featuring a pair of cat and mouse detectives. Daws Butler patterned the voice of Super Snooper (the cat) ("Leave us not be hasty, Blab!") after Ed Gardner's Archie on Duffy's Tavern.
- George and Junior was a short-lived theatrical cartoon series produced by MGM. All of the postwar shorts were directed by Tex Avery, who based them on George and Lennie from John Steinbeck's Of Mice and Men, as well as Archie and Finnegan from Duffy's Tavern.
- The Simpsons, in the form of Moe the bartender, who answers the telephone saying, "Moe's Tavern, where the elite meet to drink."
- The show was parodied in the 1947 Popeye cartoon I'll Be Skiing Ya. A billboard advertises: "Stuffy's Tavern. Where the Elite Beat the Heat. Lake Plastered, NY."
- The 1946 Warner Bros. cartoon Hush My Mouse also parodied the show, with Sniffles the mouse visiting "Tuffy's Tavern."
- Puerto Rico's best-rated television program of 1956, La Taberna India, was loosely based on Duffy's Tavern.

== Sources ==
- History of the Radio/TV series by Martin Grams Jr.
- Abe Burrows, Honest Abe: Is There Really No Business Like Show Business. (Boston: Atlantic Little, Brown.)
- Irving Younger's Basic Concepts in the Law of Evidence (law tapes published by NITA)
