= Parachute Battalion =

1941 film by Leslie Goodwins

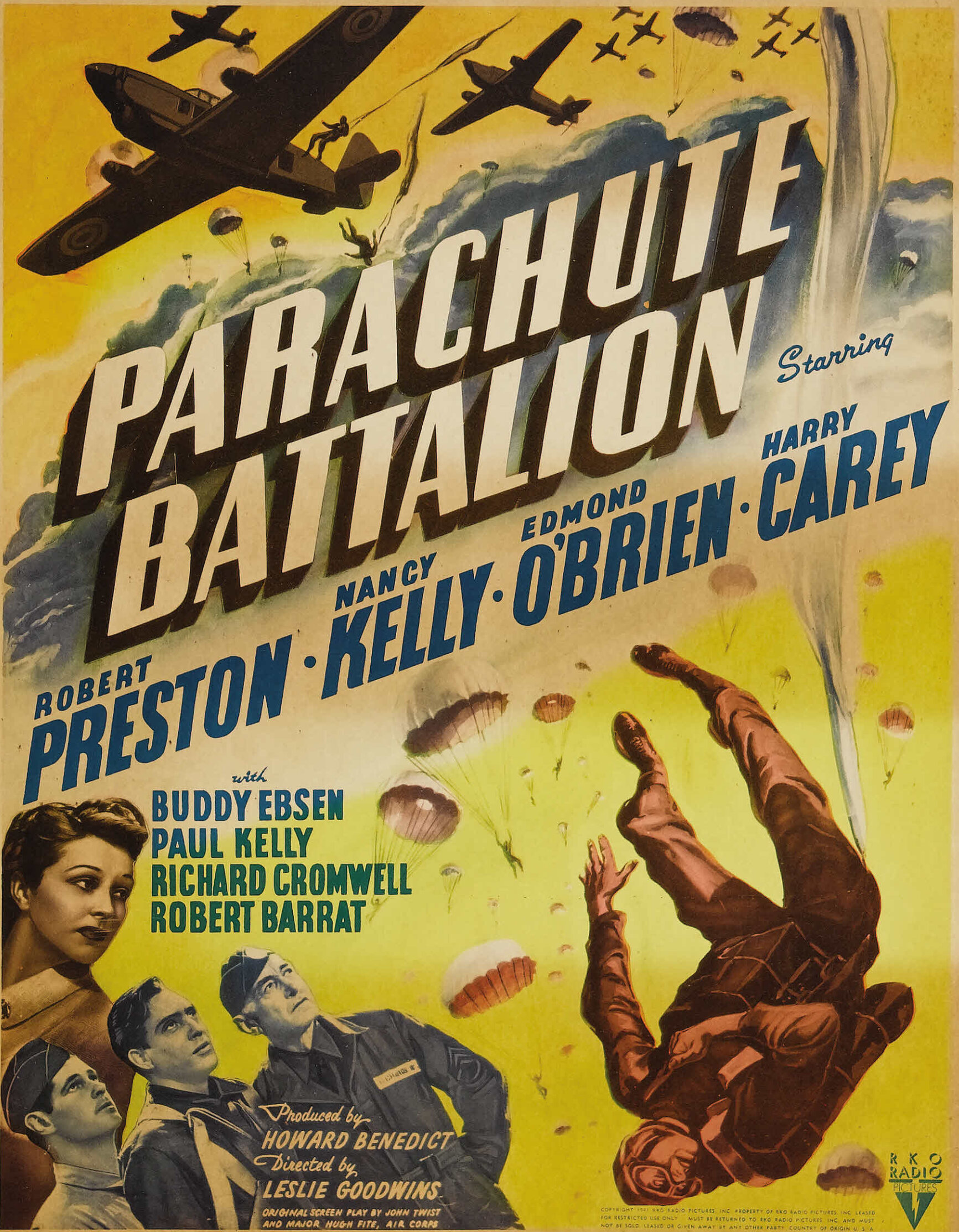
- Original film poster
- Directed by: Leslie Goodwins
- Written by: John Twist; Major (John) Hugh Fite
- Produced by: Howard Benedict
- Starring: Robert Preston; Nancy Kelly; Edmond O'Brien; Harry Carey; Buddy Ebsen
- Cinematography: J. Roy Hunt
- Edited by: Theron Warth
- Music by: Roy Webb
- Production company: RKO Radio Pictures
- Distributed by: RKO Radio Pictures
- Release date: September 12, 1941
- Running time: 75 minutes
- Country: United States
- Language: English

Parachute Battalion is a 1941 American war film directed by Leslie Goodwins and starring Robert Preston and Nancy Kelly. The supporting cast includes Edmond O'Brien, Harry Carey, and Buddy Ebsen. It was produced and distributed by RKO Pictures.

== Plot ==
Three men enlist in the United States Army in the summer of 1941. (Note: A closeup shot of orders issued to the battalion is dated "July 26, 1941.") Bill Burke (Edmond O'Brien) is doubtful of his own courage and enlists while intoxicated. Don Morse (Robert Preston), an All-American football player at Harvard, enlists to avoid being engaged to two women simultaneously, told that army privates are not allowed to marry. Jeff Hollis (Buddy Ebsen) is a hillbilly cajoled into enlisting by the daughter of a feuding family.

They meet on the train to Fort Benning, Georgia, for training as parachute infantry. Don and Bill's attempts to become better acquainted with pretty fellow passenger Kit Richards (Nancy Kelly) annoy her father, Bill "Old Thunderhead" Richards (Harry Carey), until they reveal that they are Army recruits.

In camp, they are surprised to discover that Richards is a master sergeant newly assigned to their unit as chief instructor and a pioneer of the concept. Richards reports to the commandant, his old friend and Bill's father. Bill was named after Richards and they agree to keep Bill's identity a secret from the rest of the company to avoid favoritism. Bill accepts a blind date and finds out it is Kit. When Don tries to date her, Richards encourages Bill to "stick around as long as you like."

Bill confesses his fear of parachuting to Kit. When the recruits make their first practice jump, a nervous trainee loses his nerve, pulls a pistol, and demands that the aircraft land. Bill talks him into giving him the gun. Impressed by Bill's nerve, Richards reveals to the company that he is the commandant's son, but Bill confesses his fear and applies for a transfer to another branch. Richards helps him overcome his fear of jumping and Bill saves his life in the process.

Bill's romantic rivalry with Don comes to a head when Don gets word that he is to receive an officer's commission and decides to ask Kit to marry him. Bill's anger at Don makes him careless in packing his parachute. Before Don can propose, Bill goes to Kit and admits he loves her. The rivals brawl just before the start of a demonstration airborne assault in which they are assigned the task blowing up an ammunition warehouse.

Their transport aircraft takes off without them while their sergeant, Tex (Paul Kelly), breaks up the fight. To keep them out of trouble, Tex arranges for a small O-47 observation aircraft to take them up. However, when Don jumps, his parachute becomes tangled with the tail of the aircraft. Bill crawls back and cuts the tangled shroud lines as Don hangs on to him.

The two descend together and Don reveals that he repacked Bill's chute, saving both their lives. Friends again, they destroy the objective. At the ceremony awarding them their parachute wings, Richards gives his blessing to Kit and Bill, while Don sets his sights on another woman.

== Cast ==
- Robert Preston as Donald Morse
- Nancy Kelly as Kit Richards
- Edmond O'Brien as Bill Burke
- Harry Carey as Bill Richards
- Buddy Ebsen as Jeff Hollis
- Paul Kelly as Tex
- Richard Cromwell as Spence
- Robert Barrat as Col. Burke
- Edward Fielding as Chief of Infantry
- Erville Alderson as Pa Hollis
- Selmer Jackson as Thomas Morse
- Grant Withers as Captain

== Production ==
From the signing of the Selective Training and Service Act of 1940 in the United States and American interest of military matters, Hollywood provided a rash of films in 1941 about the various branches of the US Armed Forces, both serious and comic.

In its entry in the genre, RKO sent a film crew to Fort Benning to film America's recently formed paratroopers of the 501st Parachute Infantry for their film. The founder of the American parachute troops General William C. Lee doubled for Robert Preston in some scenes.

== Reception ==
Reviewer Bosley Crowther wrote in The New York Times that "this familiarly patterned item, which came yesterday to the Rialto, is an inspirational and educational survey of the way in which our Army trains parachute troops, contained within a purely convenient and contrived fiction plot."Parachute Battalion made a profit of $128,000.

== See also ==
- Airborne
- Jumping Jacks
- West Point of the Air
