= Jumping Jacks =

1952 film by Norman Taurog

- Theatrical film poster
- Directed by: Norman Taurog
- Written by: Robert Lees; Fred Rinaldo; Herbert Baker
- Story by: Brian Marlow
- Produced by: Hal B. Wallis
- Starring: Dean Martin; Jerry Lewis; Mona Freeman; Don DeFore; Robert Strauss
- Cinematography: Daniel L. Fapp
- Edited by: Stanley E. Johnson
- Music by: Joseph J. Lilley
- Distributed by: Paramount Pictures
- Release date: June 11, 1952
- Running time: 96 min.
- Country: United States
- Language: English
- Box office: $4 million (US); 586,195 admissions (France)

Jumping Jacks is a 1952 American semi-musical comedy film starring the comedy team of Martin and Lewis. The film was directed by Norman Taurog, and released by Paramount Pictures. It was one of the military comedies that marked the duo's early career. Brigadier General Frank Dorn, Deputy Chief of the US Army's Information Office praised Jumping Jacks as something that would "contribute to troop morale within the Army."

== Plot ==
United States Army Corporal Chick Allen is a paratrooper preparing a show with other soldiers. The general, however, is unhappy with the quality of past shows and is threatening to eliminate them unless the quality improves, which is why Chick has invited his former partner, Hap Smith, to help out.

Hap, who has continued their nightclub act with a new partner, Betsy Carter, poses as a soldier so that he can do one performance with the general in the audience. The show impresses the general so much that he arranges for the show (including Hap) to tour other camps. Fearing a court-martial, Chick and the rest of the performers pass Hap off as Private "Dogface" Dolan, while the real "Dogface" goes into hiding.

Hap undergoes paratrooper training to keep up the ruse but he is very accident prone. However, inadvertently, it works to his benefit as everything he does is seen as "correct military conduct". The top sergeant takes notice and praises him.

Understandably, Hap wants to return to civilian life and tries to sneak away any chance he can but Chick always manages to stop him. During one of his escape attempts, under some war maneuvers, Hap destroys a key bridge and captures an enemy general. Hap is eventually exposed as a civilian but is sworn in as a paratrooper and becomes a hero.

== Cast ==
- Dean Martin as Corporal Chick Allen
- Jerry Lewis as Hap Smith
- Mona Freeman as Betsy Carter
- Don DeFore as Lieutenant Kelsey
- Robert Strauss as Sergeant McClusky
- Richard Erdman as Private "Dogface" Dolan (billed as Dick Erdman)
- Ray Teal as Brigadier General W.W. Timmons
- Marcy McGuire as Julia Loring
- Danny Arnold as Private Evans

== Production ==
Jumping Jacks was filmed from December 3, 1951, through January 23, 1952. The original story (Ready, Willing and Four F) was written during World War II by Robert Lees and Fred Rinaldo and acquired by Paramount Pictures. It was offered first to Bob Hope, then to Danny Kaye, but both turned it down because they had already done army comedies. Paramount made arrangements to bring Cantinflas up from Mexico for the film, but the war ended, making army comedies obsolete. The screenplay was updated for Martin and Lewis by Herbert Baker, who would write several other films for the team as well as write for Martin on The Dean Martin Show TV series and three of Martin's Matt Helm films.

Principal photography took place at the Airborne Department of the Infantry School, assisted by United States Air Force units stationed at Fort Benning, Georgia.

== Reception ==
In his review of Jumping Jacks for The New York Times, Bosley Crowther, noted that the film appealed to Martin and Lewis fans. He said, "The Ripping and Roaring Society of Jerry Lewis Fans — or, at least, as many members of it as the Paramount Theatre can hold — was rolling in the aisles and generally acting in its customarily warm, responsive way at the opening performance of their hero's new picture, 'Jumping Jacks,' in that theatre yesterday. And the worst that a non-subscriber to that society and its sentiments can say is that the rabid behavior of the members seemed a bit on the over-wrought side."

Reviewer and film historian Leonard Maltin considered it, "(a) good opportunity for plenty of sight gags when they join a military paratroop squad."

== Re-releases ==
Jumping Jacks was re-released on a double bill with another Martin and Lewis film, Sailor Beware in 1957 and on another double bill with Scared Stiff in 1958.

== Home media ==
The film was included on an eight-film DVD set, the Dean Martin and Jerry Lewis Collection: Volume One, released on October 31, 2006.

== See also ==
- Parachute Battalion (1941)
- Airborne (1962)
