= Crime, Inc. =

1945 film by Lew Landers

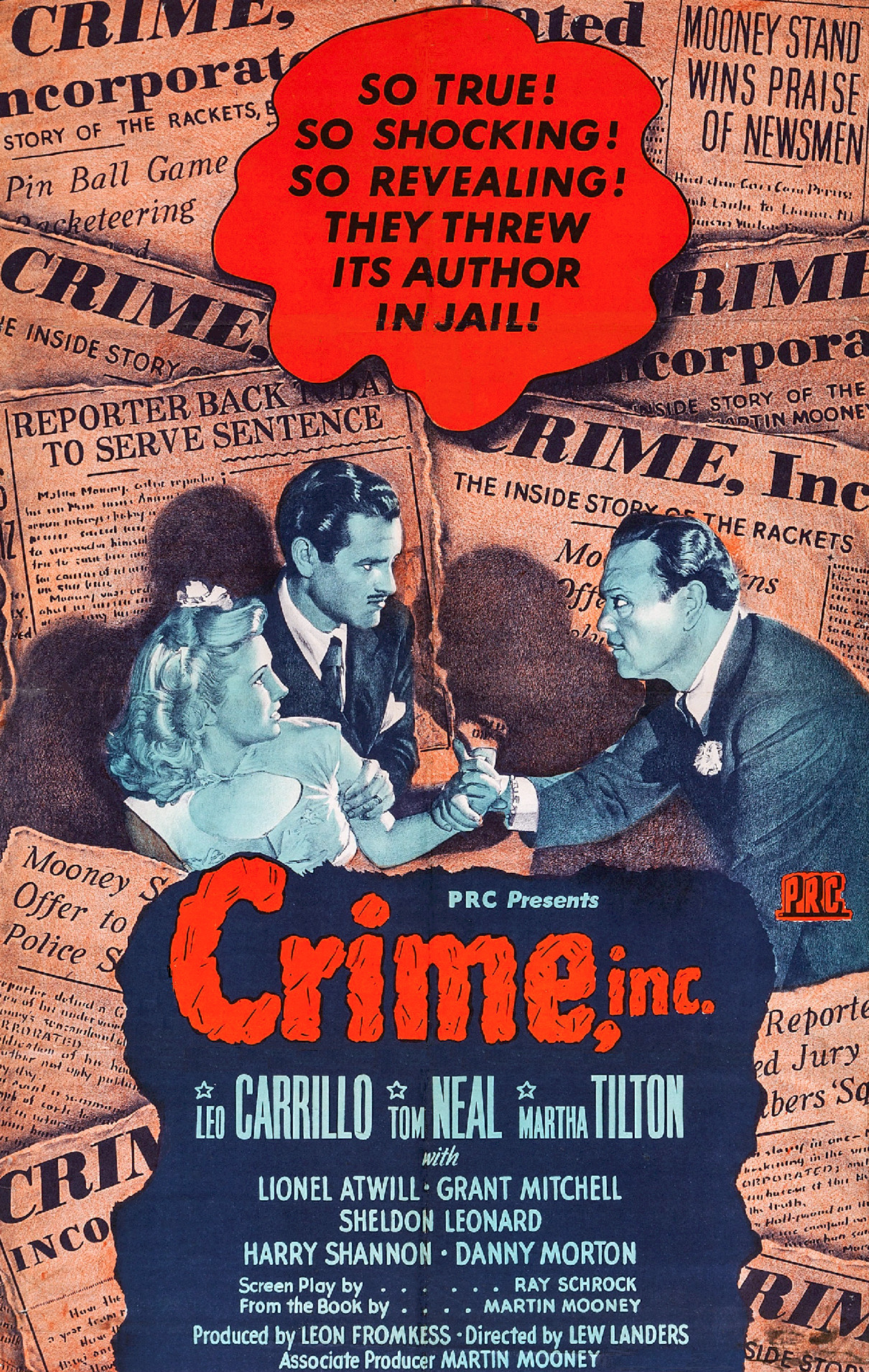
- Film poster
- Directed by: Lew Landers
- Written by: Raymond L. Schrock (screenplay); Martin Mooney (story Crime Incorporated)
- Produced by: Leon Fromkess (producer); Martin Mooney (associate producer)
- Starring: Leo Carrillo; Tom Neal; Martha Tilton
- Cinematography: James S. Brown Jr.
- Edited by: Roy V. Livingston
- Music by: Walter Greene
- Production company: PRC Pictures
- Distributed by: Producers Releasing Corporation
- Release date: April 15, 1945 (United States)
- Running time: 75 minutes
- Country: United States
- Language: English

Crime, Inc. is a 1945 American film noir crime film directed by Lew Landers starring Leo Carrillo, Tom Neal and Martha Tilton.

== Plot summary ==
The film, based on a story by former crime reporter Martin Mooney, is about a newspaper journalist who faces prison time because he refuses to name his sources. To complicate matters more, the reporter falls in love with the sister of one of the racketeers he's trying to take down.

== Cast ==
- Leo Carrillo as Anthony Charles "Tony" Marlow
- Tom Neal as Jim Riley
- Martha Tilton as Betty Van Cleve, a.k.a. Betty Egan
- Lionel Atwill as Pat Coyle
- Grant Mitchell as Wayne Clark
- Sheldon Leonard as Capt. Ferrone
- Harry Shannon as Police Commissioner Collins
- Danny Morton as Bugs Kelley a.k.a. Mike Egan
- Virginia Vale as Trixie Waters
- Don Beddoe as Deputy District Attorney Dixon
- George Meeker as Barry North
- Rod Rogers as Henchman Val Lucas

== Production ==
Martin Mooney’s 1935 book Crime Incorporated—written after he served a brief jail term for protecting confidential sources—provided the germ of the screenplay and gave the film its publicity hook. PRC producer Leon Fromkess secured Mooney as associate producer to lend authenticity, while assigning veteran B-movie director Lew Landers to keep the shoot within a reported 10-day schedule and a negative cost slightly higher than PRC’s 1944 average.

=== Filming ===
Principal photography took place at PRC’s Hollywood facilities in late December 1944 and January 1945. Cinematographer James S. Brown Jr. used low-key lighting and extensive back-projection to stretch sets and create an urban atmosphere on limited sound-stage acreage.

== Release ==
Crime, Inc. opened on April 15, 1945 in New York City at the Rialto Theatre. According to Motion Picture Daily, the picture earned approximately US$6,000 in its second and final week, a modest but acceptable take for a dual-bill programmer on Broadway.

=== Censorship ===
Days before a planned Chicago premiere, the city’s Police Motion Picture Censor Board banned the film outright, objecting to its depiction of municipal corruption. PRC appealed to Police Commissioner James Allman, arguing that the picture had already passed New York state censors without cuts. The ban was lifted after minor dialogue trims, and the film subsequently played a successful engagement at the Garrick Theatre.

== Soundtrack ==
- Martha Tilton - "I'm Guilty" (Written by Jay Livingston and Ray Evans)
- Martha Tilton - "Lonely Little Camera Girl" (Written by Jay Livingston and Ray Evans)
- Martha Tilton - "What a Fool I Was" (Written by Marla Shelton and Nacio Porter Brown as Nacio Porter Brown Jr.)
- "That's It" (Written by Marla Shelton and Nacio Porter Brown as Nacio Porter Brown Jr.)

== Legacy ==
By the 1970s the film’s copyright was not renewed, and it has since entered the public domain in the United States; numerous budget labels have issued it on VHS, DVD and digital platforms.
