= Ed Gardner =

American actor (1901–1963)

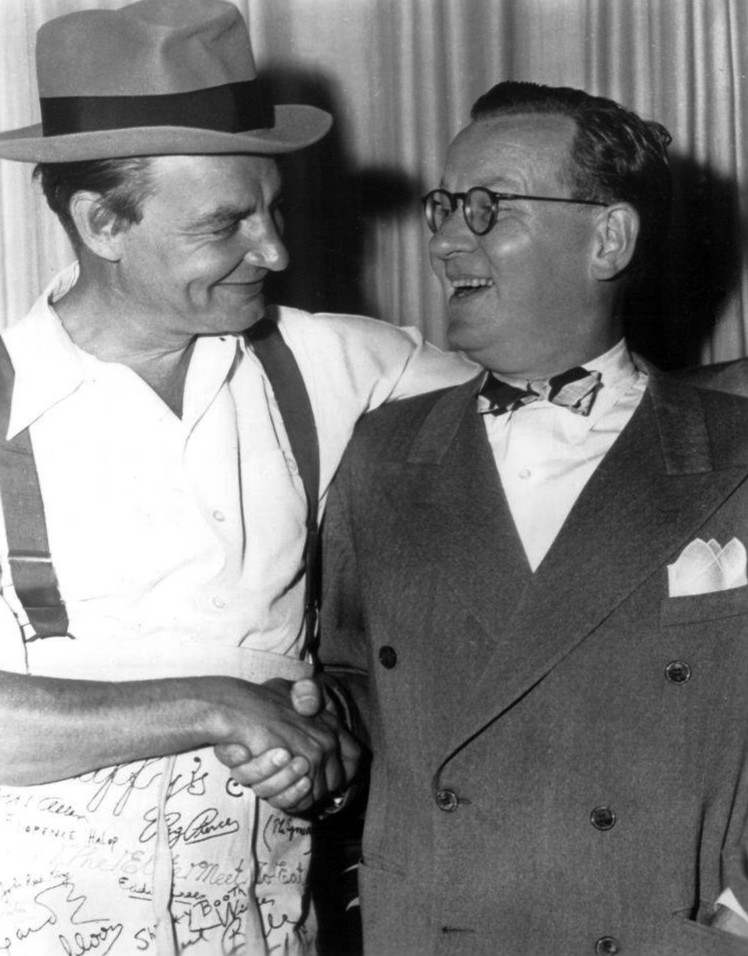
- Gardner as Archie (left) with Ransom Sherman, the host of the radio program which replaced Duffy's Tavern for its summer hiatus.
- Born: Edward Poggenberg; June 29, 1901; Astoria, Queens, New York City, U.S.
- Died: August 17, 1963 (aged 62); Los Angeles, California, U.S.
- Occupations: Actor; writer; director
- Years active: 1931–1962
- Known for: Creator and star of the radio's popular Duffy's Tavern comedy series
- Notable work: Duffy's Tavern, The Man with My Face
- Spouses: Shirley Booth (m. 1929; div. 1942) Simone Hegemann (m. 1943)
- Children: 2

Ed Gardner (born Edward Poggenberg; June 29, 1901 – August 17, 1963) was an American comic actor, writer, and director; he is best remembered as the creator, and star, of the radio's popular Duffy's Tavern comedy series.

== Early years ==
Gardner was born Edward Poggenberg in Astoria, New York. His father was an ornamental plasterer who also played semiprofessional baseball. Gardner attended Public School 4 and William Cullen Bryant High School in Astoria. He dropped out of school when he was 14 in order to play the piano at a neighborhood saloon.

Before going into entertainment as a career, Gardner worked as a stenographer, a clerk for a railroad, and a salesman. He became interested in the theater when he worked with publicity for producer Crosby Gaige.

During World War I, Gardner served in the 7th Regiment from New York.

== Early career ==
Gardner's initial venture into producing came when he and actor Eddie Blaine joined forces to produce the comedy College (or Collitch) at the Cherry Lane Theatre in Greenwich Village. It was then that he changed his name, signing the contract with "Ed Gardner", rather than "Ed Poggenburg".

Gardner was a representative for the J. Walter Thompson advertising agency before going into show business. He began producing for the stage in the early 1930s. He produced the drama play Coastwise on Broadway (1931) and wrote and directed the Broadway comedy After Such Pleasures (1934).

== Radio ==
In the early 1940s, Gardner worked as a director, writer, and producer for radio programs. In 1941, he created a character for This Is New York, a program that he was producing. The character, which Gardner played, became Archie of Duffy's Tavern.

He found fame on radio with Duffy's Tavern, portraying the wisecracking, malaprop-prone barkeeper Archie. The successful radio program aired on CBS from 1941 to 1942, on the NBC Blue Network from 1942 to 1944, and on NBC from 1944 to 1951. Speaking in a nasal New York accent, and sounding like just about every working class New Yorker his creator had ever known, Gardner as Archie invariably began each week's show by answering the telephone and saying, "Duffy's Tavern, where the elite meet to eat, Archie the manager speaking, Duffy ain't here—oh, hello, Duffy."

Duffy the owner never appeared, but Archie did, with Gardner assuming the role himself after he could not find the right actor to play the role. Regulars in the tavern included Duffy's airheaded, man-crazy daughter, droll waiter Eddie, barfly Finnegan and Clancy the cop. The daughter was played by several actresses but began with Shirley Booth, Gardner's first wife, with whom he remained friends even after their 1942 divorce.

Gardner also brought radio directing experience to Duffy's Tavern. He had previously originated the Rudy Vallee-John Barrymore radio show and directed shows for George Burns and Gracie Allen, Bing Crosby, Ripley's Believe It or Not, Al Jolson and Fanny Brice. In addition, Gardner was one of the show's writers and its script editor in all but name, though he had a staff that included Abe Burrows, Sol Saks, Parke Levy, Larry Rhine, Larry Gelbart, and Dick Martin. He was notorious for hiring as a writer anyone who sounded funny to him in passing, but Gardner ultimately had the final say on each show's script.

In 1949, hoping to be able to take advantage of Puerto Rico's income-tax-free status for future media ventures, Gardner moved his radio show there, but it was not as successful as it was when it originated from Hollywood, California. Many guest personalities declined to make the journey to appear on the show and it eventually went off the air in 1951.

Gardner invited humorist F. Chase Taylor, radio's "Col. Stoopnagle," to write scripts and make appearances on the show during its Puerto Rico period.

== Films and television ==
Gardner recreated his role as Archie for the motion picture version, Duffy's Tavern (1945), at Paramount. Besides Gardner, the movie featured dozens of Paramount Pictures stars. Gardner was the producer of the film noir crime/thriller The Man with My Face (1951) for his own company, Edward F. Gardner Productions. It was released by United Artists but was a boxoffice disappointment.

Gardner also tried bringing Duffy's Tavern to television in 1954, starring himself alongside comedians Jimmy Conlin and Alan Reed. Despite solid production values (with filming at the Hal Roach studio in Hollywood) and the presence of familiar character actors, the series ran for only one year, yielding 38 half-hour episodes. Radio historian Gerald Nachman (Raised on Radio) quoted writer Larry Rhine as saying the film and television failures were in large part due to Gardner's inability to adapt to camera angles. "He thought he could do TV, so he left radio," Rhine told Nachman. "He was a bad actor, and he knew it."

== Personal life ==
Gardner and Booth were married for 13 years, divorcing in 1942. Gardner's second marriage, to Simone Hegemann in 1943, endured until his death and produced two sons, Edward Jr. (b. 1944) and Stephen (b. 1948). By 1958, the tall, gangling comedian was semi-retired. He was living with his wife and sons in Beverly Hills and making only occasional guest appearances, such as a few turns on Alfred Hitchcock Presents in 1961 and 1962.

== Death ==
On August 17, 1963, Gardner died at age 62 of a liver ailment at Good Samaritan Hospital in Los Angeles. He was interred in Chapel of the Pines at Hollywood Forever Cemetery, Hollywood.

== Quotes ==
Some of Gardner's once-famous malaprops as Archie on Duffy's Tavern include:

- "Opera is when a guy gets stabbed in the back and instead of bleeding, he sings."
- "Leave us not jump to seclusion."
- "Now, don't infirm me that I'm stupid."
- "Fate has fickled its finger at me."
- "Get me the lost and foundling division."
- "There's two kinds of guys go to church—them that doesn't and them that don't."

== Selected filmography ==
- Alfred Hitchcock Presents (1961) (Season 6 Episode 22: "The Horseplayer") as Sheridan
- Alfred Hitchcock Presents (1962) (Season 7 Episode 25: "The Last Remains") as Marvin Foley
