= ITC Entertainment =

British television and film company, 1954–1997

- Logo used from 1989–1997
- Type: Subsidiary
- Industry: Media
- Founded: 1954; 72 years ago
- Founders: Lord Grade; Prince Littler; Val Parnell
- Defunct: 1997; 29 years ago
- Fate: Folded into PolyGram Television; Library sold off to Carlton Communications
- Successor: Studio: PolyGram Television; Library: ITV Studios; The Muppets Studio; The Jim Henson Company
- Headquarters: London, United Kingdom
- Key people: Lord Grade
- Products: Films; TV shows
- Services: Distribution
- Parent: ATV (1957–1966); Associated Communications Corporation (1966–1982); Bell Group (1982–1988); Bond Corporation (1988); PolyGram Filmed Entertainment (1995–1997)
- Divisions: ITC Home Video; ITC Film Distributors; AP Films; ITC Films

The Incorporated Television Company (ITC), or ITC Entertainment as it was referred to in the United States, was a British company involved in the production and distribution of television programmes.

== History ==
=== Incorporated Television Programme Company ===
Television mogul Lew Grade set up the Incorporated Television Programme Company (ITP) with Prince Littler and Val Parnell in 1954. Originally designed to be a contractor for the UK's new ITV network, the company failed to win a contract when the Independent Television Authority felt that doing so would give too much control in the entertainment business to the Grade family's companies (which included large talent agencies and theatre interests) although the ITA said that ITP were free to make their own programmes which they could sell to the new network companies. ITP put most of the production budget into producing one show, The Adventures of Robin Hood (ITV, 1955–59).

However, the winner of one of the contracts, the Associated Broadcasting Development Company, had insufficient funds to start broadcasting, so the ITP owners were brought into the consortium—now renamed the Associated Broadcasting Company (ABC)—and Lew Grade came to dominate it.

=== Incorporated Television Company ===
In 1957, now known as Incorporated Television Company (ITC), the company became a subsidiary of Associated Television (ATV)—the name ABC had adopted after threats of legal action from fellow ITV company Associated British Cinemas (Television) Ltd—and produced its own programmes for ATV and for syndication in the United States. It also distributed ATV material outside of the UK. From 1966 to 1982 it was a subsidiary of Associated Communications Corporation after the acquisition of ATV.

The initials 'ITC' stood for two different things: Independent Television Corporation for sales to the Americas, and Incorporated Television Company for sales to the rest of the world. The American Independent Television Corporation was formed in 1958 as a joint venture with Jack Wrather. In September 1958 it purchased Television Programs of America (TPA) for $11,350,000. Wrather sold his shares to Lew Grade at the end of the decade.

The large foreign sales achieved by ITC during the British government's export drives of the 1960s and 1970s led to ACC receiving the Queen's Award for Export on numerous occasions.

=== The 1980s ===
In the summer of 1980, two films released by AFD within six weeks of each other helped lead to the distribution company's dissolution. Can't Stop the Music, designed to be a showcase for the Village People at the height of disco music, was released 20 June 1980, by which time disco's popularity had diminished and the form was experiencing a backlash from music listeners. The poorly reviewed film ultimately grossed $2 million on a $20 million budget. On 1 August 1980, the release of the poorly received Raise the Titanic! met with pre-release criticism from the novel's author, Clive Cussler, and recouped only a fraction of its costs; Grade himself retired from active film production, commenting that it would have been cheaper to "lower the Atlantic." Cussler himself told People Weekly Magazine, "The film was so poor, it boggles the mind."

After the films' failures, ITC and EMI agreed to sell AFD and the distribution rights to its library to Universal Pictures, though the AFD films which were then in post production at the time were still ultimately released by AFD, to handle the release of the remaining pictures still in production at the time of the sale, beginning with The Legend of the Lone Ranger, and including On Golden Pond, Sophie's Choice, The Dark Crystal, and The Great Muppet Caper. As of this writing. the various copyrights have reverted to their respective owners, but Universal still maintains theatrical rights to most of the ITC and EMI films initially released by AFD.

The AFD fiasco was just one blow against Grade's entertainment empire; Grade found himself essentially ejected from ITV following the 1980 franchise round, which stipulated that ACC needed to sell the majority of its shares in ATV and turn ATV Midlands into a new business, Central Independent Television; the Independent Broadcasting Authority had previously criticized ATV's lack of commitment to their Midlands broadcast area, in favor of creating big-budget productions alongside ATV at their Elstree studios (which were sold as a part of the transition from ATV to Central).

The final blow came in the summer of 1982, when majority control of ACC was sold to Australian financier Robert Holmes à Court. Grade had thought Court to be a friend, and allowed him to purchase majority control of ACC; upon doing so, Court promptly performed a boardroom coup against Grade and fired many of ACC and ITC's staff (even, as Grade sadly noted, his tea lady).

Following Court's assumption of control, ITC kept a low profile, largely subsisting on made-for-television films and other projects, as well as the distribution of their back-catalogue; the company also picked up television distribution rights to Kings Road Entertainment titles. The company also picked up distribution rights of future television movies by Moonlight Productions when the deal was signed in 1983. In 1987, ITC and HBO signed an exclusive agreement for ITC to handle distribution of HBO's original films. Later that year, the partnership was expanded on further as the two companies struck a deal to co-produce more HBO-exclusive films (HBO would retain home video rights, while ITC took foreign and broadcast television distribution rights).

During 1988, The Bell Group, the owners of ITC were taken over by the Bond Corporation. Subsequently, the new owners started an asset-stripping programme. In November 1988 ITC Entertainment was bought by its management. In 1990, ITC abandoned television production and concentrated on low-budget feature films. TV production at ITC would not resume until the company forged a deal with producer David Gerber in 1993. In the meantime, it entered into a financing agreement with Interscope Communications to handle U.S. and foreign sales of its telemovies.

=== Final Years ===
In 1990, ITC briefly attempted to enter the lucrative American game show market, with a syndicated revival of Tic-Tac-Dough, which had previously run from 1978 to 1986 in syndication, alongside Barry & Enright Productions. However, the show was off the air by March 1991, mainly due to a glut of syndicated game show offerings during the 1990–91 season, as well as several changes in gameplay which were criticized, as was host Patrick Wayne.

In 1995, PolyGram purchased the company for $156 million. with Grade once again returning to ITC to act as a consultant until his death in December 1998. In 1997, it was absorbed into PolyGram Television.

On 10 December 1998, Universal Studios' parent, Seagram purchased PolyGram for $10.2 billion. In early January 1999, Carlton Communications bought the ITC television and film library as well as the ITC name and logo from PolyGram/Seagram for £91 million, which reunited the programme library of ATV and Central Television and doubled the stock of its library division (Carlton International), giving it a total of 15,000 hours of programming. Carlton chairman Michael Green said: 'The ITC library is a jewel in the crown. We can now unite it with the other gems from Britain's film and television heritage in our excellent library.' In 2004, Carlton was acquired by Granada plc (which then renamed itself ITV plc). ITV Studios continues to release ITC's original output through television and Internet-streaming repeats, books and DVD and Blu-ray releases.

== Productions ==
=== Reputation ===
ITC is best known for being the company behind many successful British cult TV filmed series during the 1960s and 1970s, such as The Saint, Randall and Hopkirk (Deceased), Danger Man, The Baron, Gideon's Way, The Champions, The Prisoner, Thunderbirds, Captain Scarlet and the Mysterons, Stingray, Joe 90, Interpol Calling, Man in a Suitcase, Strange Report, Department S, The Persuaders!, Jason King, The Adventurer, The Protectors, Space 1999, UFO and Return of the Saint. Some ATV videotaped productions, usually recorded at ATV Elstree Studios, were produced as 'international productions' and distributed overseas with ITC branding - these included The Muppet Show, Brian Clemens' Thriller and The Julie Andrews Hour, the latter of which was taped at ABC-TV studios in Hollywood.

=== Entry into production ===
ITC got its start as a production company when former American producer Hannah Weinstein approached Lew Grade. Weinstein wanted to make a programme called The Adventures of Robin Hood. Weinstein proposed making the series for ITV and simultaneously marketing it in the United States through an American television distribution company, Official Films. The series was a big success in both countries, running from 1955 until 1959 on CBS and ATV London.

=== "Ground-breakages" ===
Grade realised the potential in overseas sales and colour television (the last 14 episodes of The Adventures of Sir Lancelot were filmed in colour a decade before colour television existed in the UK), and ITC combined high production values with exotic locations and uses of variations on the same successful formula for the majority of its television output.

=== ITC United States programmes ===
Although most of the ITC series were produced in Britain, ITC often worked with Television Programs of America (TPA) and several series were filmed in America. Possibly the earliest ITC series produced in the US was Fury, a Saturday morning live-action series, about a beloved ranch horse, which starred Peter Graves and ran on NBC in the late 1950s and early 1960s.

In 1963 Gerry Anderson's Anderson-Provis (AP) Films became part of ACC and produced Fireball XL-5, the hugely successful children's series Thunderbirds and, under its successor company Century 21 Television/Cinema Productions, Captain Scarlet and the Mysterons. ITC also funded Anderson-created programmes aimed at the adult market, including UFO and Space: 1999. It was at ITC's request that Fanderson, "the Gerry Anderson Appreciation Society," was founded. Another ITC children's series was The Adventures of Rupert Bear, the first television outing for the Daily Express cartoon character. ITC (in partnership with the Italian company RAI) was also behind Franco Zeffirelli's Biblical mini-series Jesus of Nazareth, Moses the Lawgiver, and the Gregory Peck television film The Scarlet and the Black.

In 1978, ITC launched a subsidiary, Marble Arch Productions, for American-produced programmes, which in 1982 was renamed ITC Productions. Outside of telefilms and mini-series, Marble Arch only ever produced two sitcoms, Maggie, which ABC aired from 1981 to 1982 and The Two of Us, which aired on CBS, also that same season. After the renaming, ITC attempted to branch out more into series and the lucrative first-run syndication market. In 1990, ITC placed Marble Arch up for sale amid financial losses; it was ultimately sold to Interscope Communications, a film and television production company who assumed Marble Arch's former duties in exchange for ITC's handling of distribution and co-financing of Interscope projects. The company did not return to first-run television production until 1993, via a deal with producer David Gerber. Interscope would eventually return to common ownership with ITC following its acquisition by PolyGram.

=== Films and sundry programmes ===
In addition to television programming, ITC also produced several films. In 1976, the company teamed up with General Cinema Corporation to form Associated General Films, and produced films including Voyage of the Damned, Capricorn One, and The Eagle Has Landed; the partnership ended the following year.

Other films produced by ITC include The Boys from Brazil, The Return of the Pink Panther, The Last Unicorn, and a number of The Jim Henson Company productions: The Dark Crystal and the first two Muppet films, The Muppet Movie and The Great Muppet Caper. Initially, ITC productions were licensed out to other US studios for release until 1979, when ITC partnered with another UK-based production company, Thorn EMI Screen Entertainment, to create Associated Film Distribution, which would release films produced by each company, as well as pick-ups from other production companies. In 1979, the subsidiary Black Lion Films was founded in the manner of Euston Films (owned by Thames Television), but its best remembered production, The Long Good Friday, was sold on to HandMade Films.

== Current rights ownership ==
Today, the underlying rights are generally owned by ITV Studios Global Entertainment via ITV plc and its respective predecessors, although in most cases Shout! Factory now holds full worldwide distribution rights (with US theatrical distribution handled by Shout!'s Westchester Films division, passed on from former distributors Metro-Goldwyn-Mayer and Park Circus). In turn, Shout!'s video distribution rights in North America to a majority of the ITC Entertainment library were assumed from Lionsgate Home Entertainment (whose predecessor, Artisan Entertainment, had held rights to ITC's back catalogue since the early 1990s, and had been licensing ITC's TV output since the 1980s).

American video distribution rights to ITC's feature film catalog were originally licensed to Magnetic Video in 1980, and that company's successors – 20th Century-Fox Video and CBS/Fox Video – retained the rights for several years afterwards; video rights were licensed to J2 Communications beginning in 1988 (under the ITC Home Video branding). This came to an end following a legal dispute between ITC and J2 over the rights to the National Lampoon IP then-owned by J2, which ITC had attempted to auction off without J2's knowledge or consent.

As for ITC's television output, Carlton (and later Granada and now ITV) released some of these shows on DVD both in Europe and North America. There were however a few exceptions: The Adventures of Robin Hood and the other swashbuckling adventure series of the late 1950s and early 1960s were released on DVD by Network, as was Strange Report. Many of the drama shows from the 1960s and 1970s have since been released by Network as limited edition box sets. In 2005, to commemorate the 50th anniversary of the founding of the company, Network released a DVD box set entitled ITC 50 featuring episodes from eighteen different ITC productions.

The Walt Disney Company has owned the Muppets franchise since 2004, including ITC productions The Muppet Show, The Muppet Movie, and The Great Muppet Caper, although Universal Pictures retains domestic theatrical rights to the latter two productions. The Jim Henson Company owns the ITC production The Dark Crystal as it had bought the film from the company after production had completed. While Universal retains both domestic and international theatrical rights to the film, its home video and television broadcast rights are licensed to Shout! Factory.

== List of ITC Entertainment productions and distributions ==
ITC produced and distributed a wide range of content across both film and television, over several decades. ITC productions and distributions crossed many different genres – from historical adventure, to spy-fi and action, and later into both children's and adult science-fiction – as well as films covering many different subjects.

The ITC Distributions page offers a complete list of ITC produced and distributed programmes.

== Studios ==
ITC had no studios of its own. Programmes were made in several facilities but most notably at ABPC's Elstree film studios (not to be confused with ATV's nearby Clarendon Road Studios, Borehamwood, which was a live/videotape facility, and now known as BBC Elstree). However, the MGM-British Studios complex at Borehamwood, and the Rank Organisation's Pinewood and Shepperton Studios were also used. Ghost Squad was made at the Independent Artists Studio in Beaconsfield.

== Associated Communications Corporation companies ==
- APF
- ATV Network
- Central Independent Television
- ITC Films
- Independent Television Corporation
- Incorporated Television Company
- Marble Arch Productions

== See also ==
- AP Films
- Century 21 Productions
- Cult television
- Gerry Anderson
- ITV (TV network)
- Sapphire Films
