= Fury (American TV series) =

- Fury DVD cover
- Also known as: Brave Stallion
- Genre: Western
- Written by: Robert B. Bailey; Arthur Browne, Jr.; Lillie Hayward; Melvin Levy; Richard Schayer; Nat Tanchuck
- Directed by: Ray Nazarro; Sidney Salkow; Lesley Selander
- Starring: Peter Graves; Bobby Diamond; Jimmy Baird; William Fawcett; Roger Mobley
- Theme music composer: Ernest Gold
- Composers: Les Baxter; Emil Newman
- Country of origin: United States
- Original language: English
- No. of seasons: 5
- No. of episodes: 116 (list of episodes)

Production
- Executive producer: Leon Fromkess
- Producers: Mark Bennett; Irving Cummings; Ray Nazarro
- Cinematography: Kenneth Peach
- Editor: Henry Adams
- Running time: 30 mins. (approx)
- Production companies: Television Programs of America (1955– 1958) (seasons 1–3); Independent Television Corporation (1958–1960) (seasons 4–5)

Original release
- Network: NBC
- Release: October 15, 1955 – March 19, 1960

Fury (retitled Brave Stallion in syndicated reruns) is an American Western television series that aired on NBC from 1955 to 1960. It stars Peter Graves as Jim Newton, who operates the Broken Wheel Ranch in California; Bobby Diamond as Jim's adopted son, Joey Clark Newton, and William Fawcett as ranch hand Pete Wilkey. Roger Mobley co-starred in the two final seasons as Homer "Packy" Lambert, a friend of Joey's.

The frequent introduction to the show depicts the beloved stallion running inside the corral and approaching the camera as the announcer reads: "FURY!...The story of a horse...and a boy who loves him." Fury is the first American series to be produced originally by Television Programs of America and later by the British-based company ITC Entertainment.

Outdoor footage for the series was filmed primarily on the Iverson Movie Ranch in Chatsworth, California, throughout the five-season run of the series. Some of the earliest footage for the series was shot on the Garner Ranch in Idyllwild, California, and one episode included footage shot at Jungleland USA in Thousand Oaks, California.

== Synopsis ==
The story begins with two young boys fighting on the street. As Joey Clark, the winner of the exchange, walks away, the loser attempts to throw something at him, but the object goes through a nearby window. The store owner quickly pins the blame on Joey, who has been labeled a troublemaker from past incidents. Rancher Jim Newton witnesses the incident and follows along as Joey is taken before the judge to clear the boy's name. After learning that Joey is an orphan, Newton takes him home to his Broken Wheel Ranch and begins adoption proceedings.

A typical plot involved a guest star who falls into mischief or was rebellious or disorderly, and got into trouble, but is subsequently rescued by Fury. In most episodes, Fury allowed only Joey to ride him, but occasionally others were allowed the honor of mounting Fury if they had done a good deed for the horse. One of the original concepts of the show was that Fury remained a "wild" (untamed) horse, that would not allow anyone but Joey to ride him or even come near him. In several episodes, people would see the calm interaction between the horse "and the boy who loved him," and assume that the horse must be broken, but when they tried to put a saddle on him, Fury would rear up and attack them.

Numerous episodes focus on youth organizations, including the Boy Scouts, Big Brothers, Junior Achievement, 4-H Club, Little League, and even the Girl Scouts. A 1957 episode is dedicated to Fire Prevention Week.

== Cast ==
=== Main ===
- Peter Graves: Jim Newton
- Bobby Diamond: Joey Newton
- William Fawcett: Pete

=== Recurring ===
Ann Robinson played Joey Newton's dedicated teacher, Helen Watkins, in nine episodes of the first season. In addition to Roger Mobley as Packy Lambert, another friend of Joey's is portrayed in the series by child actor Jimmy Baird (born 1948), who was cast as Rodney "Pee Wee" Jenkins. James Seay portrayed a sheriff in six episodes. Maudie Prickett was cast twice, once in the title role of "Aunt Harriet" (1958).

=== Guests ===
Noted character actor Denver Pyle appeared in four episodes between 1955 and 1958, playing different characters. In his first appearance, he played a character claiming to be Joey's biological father.

Among the other guest stars were Shelley Fabares as Midge Mallon in "The Tomboy" (1957), Tony Young in "Timber Walker" (1959), Lee Van Cleef as Race Collins in "House Guests" (1959), and Walter Maslow in "The Relay Station" (1959).

Jim Bannon appeared twice on Fury, once as a prison warden in the episode "Fish Story" (1958). Andy Clyde was cast in "Fury Runs to Win" (1956) and "Black Gold" (1959). Russ Conway was cast in "Joey Goes Hunting" (1955) and "A Present for Packy" (1960). Nan Leslie was cast twice on Fury, as Stella Lambert in "The Model Plane" (1958) and as Packy's mother in "The Pulling Contest" (1959). Paul Picerni of "Untouchables" fame, portrayed Tupelo in "Packy, the Lion Tamer" (1960). He also appeared in "An Old Indian Trick" (1959). John M. Pickard, star of the syndicated Boots and Saddles Western series, appeared in the episodes "Timber" (1956) and "Trail Drive" (1959). Will Wright, known for his curmudgeonly roles, was cast in "Ghost Town" (1955) and "The Meanest Man" (1958).

== Episodes ==
Season	Episodes	Originally released	
Season	Episodes	First released	Last released
1	26	October 15, 1955	April 7, 1956
2	20	October 6, 1956	March 30, 1957
3	26	October 12, 1957	April 5, 1958
4	22	October 4, 1958	April 4, 1959
5	22	October 10, 1959	March 19, 1960

== Production ==
=== Casting ===
NBC was only filming two new shows in 1955: Fury and the nighttime anthology Frontier, so when Peter Graves was cast, he believed it to be a prime time show and was disappointed to find out otherwise. However, the show's rating exceeded that of many prime time shows at the time.

Graves was on a five-year contract that he did not renew in 1959, so John Compton was signed to a contract to take the place of Graves. However, the show went to repeats instead for the remainder of its run and Compton was never used.

The horse was owned and trained by Hollywood horse trainer Ralph McCutcheon. It was a saddlebred stallion named Highland Dale, who McCutcheon called "Beaut" as he had originally starred in Black Beauty. He also appeared in films including Lone Star (1952) and Giant (1956).

=== Filming ===
Much of the outdoor footage was shot on the Iverson Movie Ranch in Chatsworth, where the "Fury Set" was built in 1955, specifically for the series. This set included a small house, a cabin, corrals, and other features, but it was dominated by a large barn. In addition to being used throughout five seasons of Fury, the set was used in many films, including Fury at Showdown (1957) and The 30 Foot Bride of Candy Rock (1959), and in other television series, including Bonanza and Cimarron Strip, before it burned to the ground in the massive Newhall/Malibu fire of fall 1970.

Some of the earliest footage for the series shot on the Garner Ranch in Idyllwild, California. One episode, "Packy, the Lion Tamer", which premiered on January 2, 1960, included footage shot at Jungleland USA in Thousand Oaks, California, and occasional footage appearing during the series was shot at Corriganville Movie Ranch near Simi Valley, California.

== Release ==
The series aired on NBC Saturday morning television from 11:00-11:30 am from October 15, 1955, until September 28, 1963. The timeslot moved to 11:30 am to noon from October 5, 1963, until September 3, 1966.

New episodes were aired until 1960, and then reruns aired until 1966. When Fury went off the air in 1966, there were no more live action Saturday morning shows until fall 1974.

The show was later retitled Brave Stallion for syndication.

== Reception ==
The show had an average 17.8 Nielsen rating during its first four seasons, exceeding that of many prime time shows.

A critic writing for Variety noted that "Graves scored nicely as the forthright rancher, young Diamond portrayed the boy with finesse... while [the black stallion] ran away with thesping honors in the title role... A solid entry for the moppet market."

== See also ==
- List of fictional horses
