= Bobby Diamond =

American actor and lawyer (1943–2019)

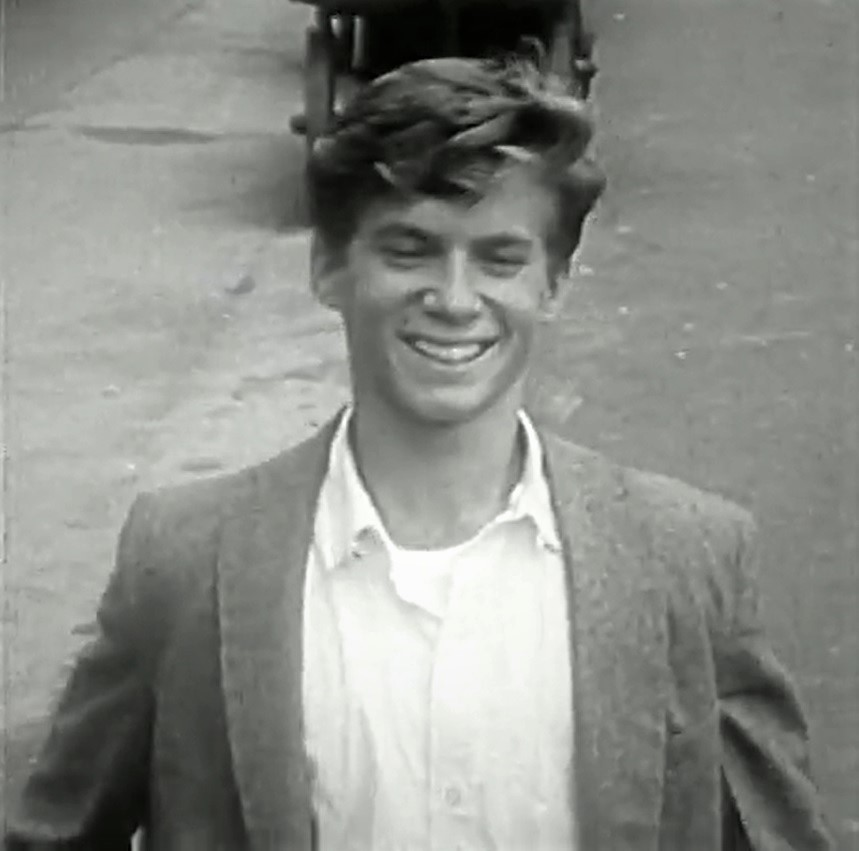
- Diamond in Airborne (1962)
- Born: Robert LeRoy Diamond; August 23, 1943; Los Angeles, California, U.S.
- Died: May 15, 2019 (aged 75); Thousand Oaks, California, U.S.
- Occupations: Actor; Lawyer
- Years active: 1952–1990
- Spouse: Tara Lynn Parker (m. 1986, divorced)
- Children: 2

Robert LeRoy Diamond (August 23, 1943 – May 15, 2019) was an American actor active during the 1950s and 1960s before retiring from the profession and becoming a lawyer. He is known best as the child protagonist for the television series Fury.

== Early life and child roles ==
Diamond was born in Los Angeles in 1943 to a Jewish family. His mother pushed him and his brother Gary into show business, and he appeared in small roles in a series of movies during the early 1950s, beginning with a bit part in The Greatest Show on Earth in 1952. In 1955 he was cast as Joey Newton, an orphan who is adopted by rancher Jim Newton (played by Peter Graves), who introduces him to a horse named Fury, after whom the series was named. The show, broadcast on NBC, ran until 1960.

After Fury ended, Diamond had roles in a variety of other TV productions, such as a guest appearance in 1965 as Evan Hendricks on The Andy Griffith Show, and a recurring role in the final season of The Many Loves of Dobie Gillis as Dobie's cousin "Dunky". He had a part on TV's The Twilight Zone episode "In Praise of Pip", originally broadcast September 27, 1963; the story concerned a U.S. soldier (played by Diamond) who is wounded in the early years of the Vietnam War. Diamond was offered the role of the middle son in My Three Sons, but refused it in favor of working on Westinghouse Playhouse, which lasted only a single season against the other show's twelve. He was also considered for the role of Robin in the Batman TV series, but at 21 was thought to be too old, and lost the role to Burt Ward.

He had a single major movie role, as a boyish recruit in 1962's Airborne. Though the movie was well-received, his movie career as an adult was limited, and his only other notable movie roles were small parts in Billie (a 1965 Patty Duke comedy) and Scream (a 1981 slasher movie).

== Later life ==
Diamond attended San Fernando Valley State College, where in addition to studying broadcast journalism, he competed in gymnastics on the rings. Later, to avoid the Vietnam War draft, he studied law at San Fernando Valley College of Law, graduating in 1970 and starting a law practice in the area. Among his clients were Kelsey Grammer and Paul Petersen.

== Personal life ==
In 1986, he married Tara Parker, whom he had met at a gym; they had two children, but were subsequently divorced.

Diamond died of cancer at Los Robles Regional Medical Center, Thousand Oaks, California, aged 75, in 2019.
