= Skippy (comic strip) =

1923-1945 American comic strip

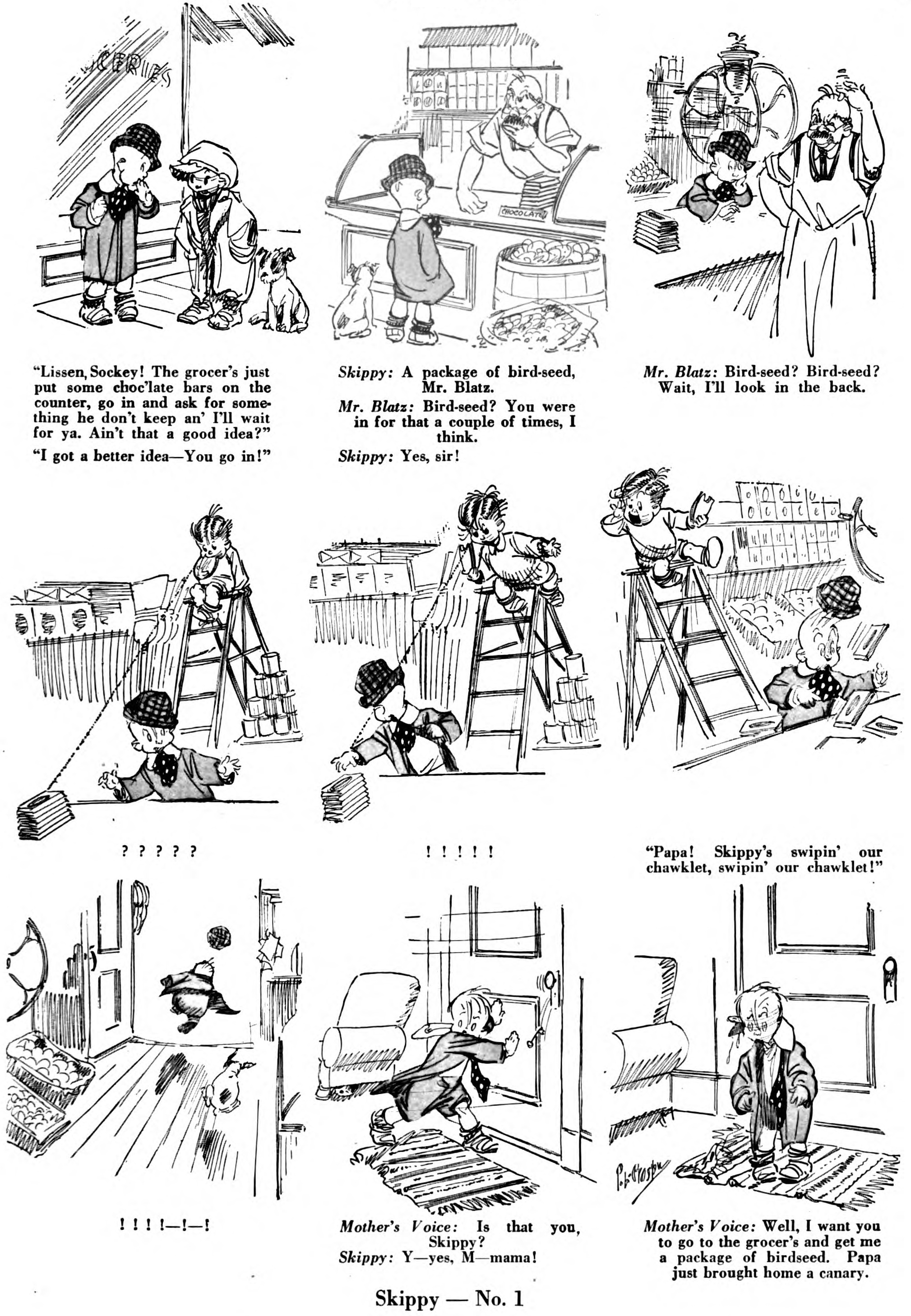
- The debut Skippy comic strip, published in Life on March 22, 1923
- Author: Percy Crosby
- Current status/schedule: Concluded daily & Sunday strip
- Launch date: 1923 (1925 in syndication)
- End date: December 2, 1945
- Syndicate: King Features Syndicate
- Publisher(s): Eastern Color Printing; IDW Publishing
- Genre(s): humor, children

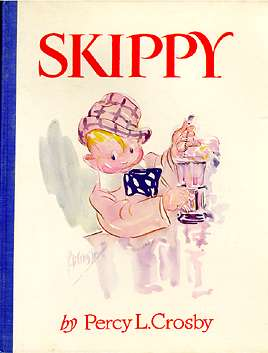
Percy Crosby's Skippy novel (Grosset & Dunlap, 1929)

Skippy is an American comic strip written and drawn by Percy Crosby that was published from 1923 to 1945. A highly popular, acclaimed and influential feature about rambunctious fifth-grader Skippy Skinner, his friends and his enemies, it was adapted into movies, a novel and a radio show. It was commemorated on a 1997 U.S. Postal Service stamp and was the basis for a wide range of merchandising—although perhaps the most well-known product bearing the Skippy name, Skippy peanut butter, used the name without Crosby's authorization, leading to a protracted trademark conflict.

== Synopsis ==
An early influence on cartoonist Charles Schulz and an inspiration for his Peanuts, Skippy is considered one of the classics of the form. In Vanity Fair, humorist Corey Ford described it as "America's most important contribution to humor of the century", while comics historian John A. Lent wrote, "The first half-century of the comics spawned many kid strips, but only one could be elevated to the status of classic... which innovated a number of sophisticated and refined touches used later by Charles Schulz and Bill Watterson..." Comics artist Jerry Robinson said,

Nothing like Skippy had ever been seen before in the comic strips. It was not just Skippy's expert draftsmanship or remarkable flair, although that artistry earned its creator a reputation as "the cartoonist's cartoonist"... The brilliance of Skippy was that here was fantasy with a realistic base, the first kid cartoon with a definable and complex personality grounded in daily life.

Skippy started in 1923 as a cartoon in Life and became a syndicated comic strip two years later through King Features Syndicate. Creator Crosby retained the copyright, a rarity for comic strip artists of the time.

== Characters and story ==
The strip focused on Skippy Skinner, a young boy living in the city. Usually wearing an enormous collar and tie and a floppy checked hat, he was an odd mix of mischief and melancholy who might equally be found stealing from the corner fruit stand, failing to master skates or baseball, complaining about the adult world, or staring sadly at an old relative's grave ("And only last year she gave me a tie").

The syndicated strip was enormously popular, at one point guaranteeing Crosby $2,350 a week, more than the United States president.

Skippy had several topper strips on the Sunday page: Always Belittlin' (Oct 17, 1926 - 1940), Comic Letter (April 22 - Sept 16, 1934) and Bug Lugs (Feb 17 - Aug 18, 1935).

During the years of the 1930s, Crosby began to suffer a severe drinking problem that compounded with a divorce from his wife. The strip lost readers when papers dropped the strip due to the perception of the strip becoming less funny with its political content, which had bent conservative by the mid-1930s, to the point where he even published a book called Would Communism Work Out in America? in 1938 that saw him pay for one of the chapters to be published in the New York Sun paper, which at one point stated the following about then-President Franklin Roosevelt: "It little becomes Roosevelt to accuse others of tyranny when he has tyrannized over every human soul in this nation. When, by every method, he is attempting to smash the United States government, is Roosevelt any different from the other dictators, now that he has just jumped into the fray?" Repeated audits by the Internal Revenue Service did not help matters. Negotiations on a new contract failed, and Crosby ended Skippy in 1945. Crosby's final years were tragic; he was unable to find steady work and drifted further into alcoholism. After a 1949 suicide attempt, he was placed in the asylum at Kings Park, New York, where he died in 1964, unable to secure release.

== In other media ==
Grosset & Dunlap published Crosby's Skippy novel in 1929. There were Skippy dolls, toys and comic books. The strip was adapted as a movie by Paramount.

The 1931 comedy film Skippy starring Jackie Cooper was based on the comic strip. It won director Norman Taurog the Academy Award for Best Director and boosted the career of its young star. Crosby disliked the film and, though he had to allow the production of a previously contracted sequel, Sooky, released the same year, he never let another Skippy movie be made.

In 1937, an attempt to adapt the comic strip into animated cartoon form was made by Mayfair Productions for United Artists, which was looking to replace Walt Disney's Mickey Mouse and Silly Symphony cartoons on its release schedule after Disney moved distribution of his films to RKO. Only one cartoon short, The Dog Catcher was produced and released.

Radio dramatist Robert Hardy Andrews wrote the daytime children's radio serial Skippy, sponsored by General Mills.

=== Trademark conflict ===
In the 1930s, the Alameda, California, food packer Rosefield Packing Co., Ltd. began to sell its newly developed hydrogenated peanut butter, which it labeled "Skippy" without Crosby's permission. Percy Crosby had the trademark invalidated in 1934, but Rosefield persisted after Crosby was committed to an asylum, and its successor companies, including Unilever and Hormel (owner since 2013), were granted rights to the trademark over the objection of Crosby's heirs. Years of expensive litigation followed, which Crosby's heirs have continued into the 2000s.

== Reprints ==
In 2012, IDW Publishing started a complete reprint series under "The Library of American Comics", with separate volumes for the daily and Sundays. On September 10, 2012, GoComics also began publishing Skippy dailies online.

== See also ==
- Muggs and Skeeter, a similar strip by Wally Bishop, that began when Skippy's popularity was at its height
