= Willard Robertson =

American actor (1886–1948)

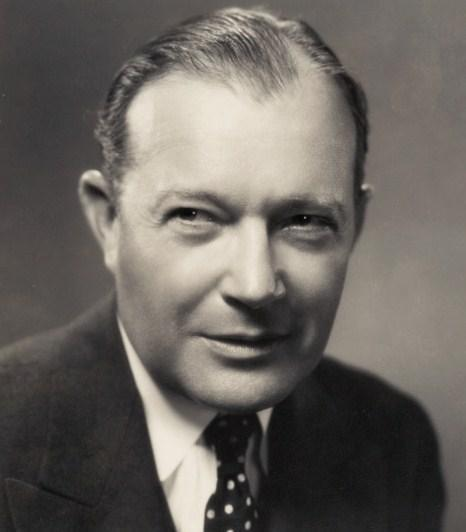
- Robertson in the 1930s
- Born: January 1, 1886; Runnels, Texas, U.S.
- Died: April 5, 1948 (aged 62); Hollywood, California, U.S.
- Occupation: Actor
- Years active: 1924–1948

Willard Robertson (January 1, 1886 – April 5, 1948) was an American actor and writer. He appeared in more than 140 films from 1924 to 1948. He was born in Runnels, Texas and died in Hollywood, California.

== Biography ==
Robertson first worked as a lawyer in Texas, but he left his profession for a sudden interest in acting after being encouraged to do so by Joseph Jefferson.

Robertson's initial venture onto the stage did not last. He returned to the practice of law as an attorney with the Interstate Commerce Commission. During World War I, he was an administrator in the Chicago office of the federal railway police.

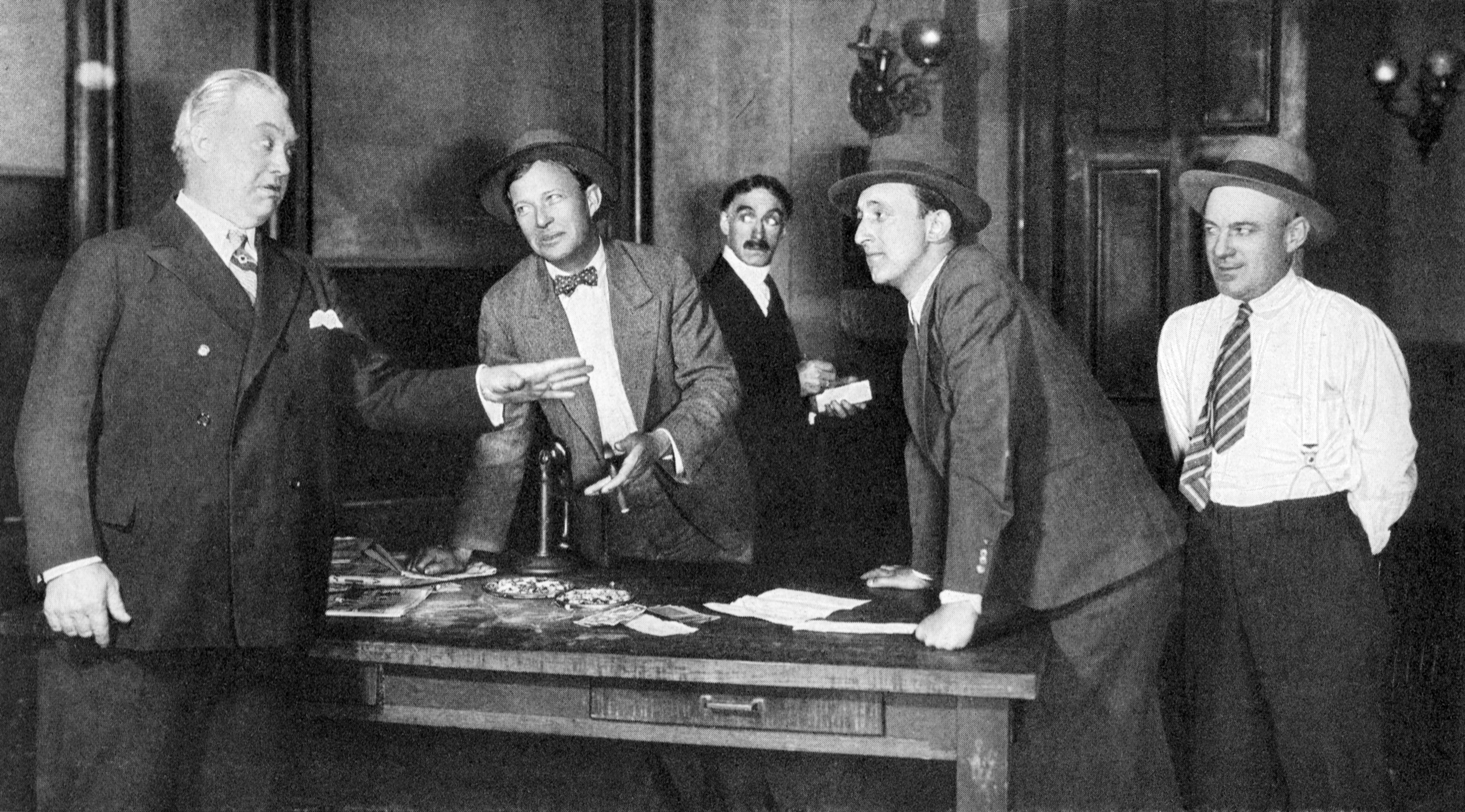
George Barbier, Willard Robertson, Claude Cooper, Allen Jenkins, and William Foran in the original Broadway production of The Front Page (1928)

He appeared on Broadway in 16 plays from 1907 to 1930. Robertson played supporting roles in many Hollywood films from 1930 until the year he died, typically portraying men of authority such as doctors, elected officials, military officers, and lawyers. He played Jackie Cooper's stern but loving father in the drama Skippy (1931) and its sequel Sooky (1931). Robertson also portrayed a flamboyant lawyer in Remember the Night (1940) and the straight sheriff in The Ox-Bow Incident (1943).

Robertson wrote the novel Moon Tide (1940), which was turned into Archie Mayo's drama thriller Moontide (1942) starring Jean Gabin and Ida Lupino.

== Selected filmography ==
- Daughters of the Night (1924) as Prof. Woodbury
- The Last of the Duanes (1930) as Texas Ranger Captain
- Once a Sinner (1931) as Speaker at Party (uncredited)
- Fair Warning (1931) as Tex Calder
- Skippy (1931) as Dr. Herbert Skinner
- City Streets (1931) as Detective (uncredited)
- The Lawyer's Secret (1931) as Police Desk Sergeant (uncredited)
- Murder by the Clock (1931) as Police Captain (uncredited)
- Silence (1931) as Phil Powers
- Shanghaied Love (1931) as Newman
- Graft (1931) as E. T. Scudder
- The Ruling Voice (1931) as Ed Bailey
- The Cisco Kid (1931) as Enos Hankins
- Sooky (1931) as Mr. Skinner
- The Gay Caballero (1932) as Major Lawrence Blount
- Behind the Mask (1932) as Capt. E.J. Hawkes
- Steady Company (1932) as Pop Henley
- The Broken Wing (1932) as Sylvester Cross
- The Rider of Death Valley (1932) as Bill Joyce
- So Big (1932) as The Doctor (scenes deleted)
- The Famous Ferguson Case (1932) as Sheriff
- The Texas Bad Man (1932) as Milton Keefe
- Tom Brown of Culver (1932) as Capt. White
- Doctor X (1932) as Detective O'Halloran
- Guilty as Hell (1932) as Police Sgt. Alcock
- Okay, America! (1932) as Bit Role
- Wild Girl (1932) as Red Pete
- Virtue (1932) as MacKenzie
- I Am a Fugitive from a Chain Gang (1932) as Prison Board Chairman
- The Strange Love of Molly Louvain (1932)
- Central Park (1932)
- If I Had a Million (1932) as Fred - Glidden Associate (uncredited)
- Call Her Savage (1932) as Pete Springer
- Silver Dollar (1932) as Al - Yates' Office Manager (uncredited)
- Frisco Jenny (1932) as Capt. of Police
- Born to Fight (1932) as Dad Kinney
- Destination Unknown (1933) as Joe Shano
- Central Airport (1933) as Havana Airport Manager
- Trick for Trick (1933) as Dr. Frank Fitzgerald
- Supernatural (1933) as Prison Warden
- Heroes for Sale (1933) as The Sheriff (scenes deleted)
- Another Language (1933) as Harry Hallam
- Tugboat Annie (1933) as Red Severn
- Wild Boys of the Road (1933) as Captain of Detectives
- The Mad Game (1933) as Warden
- Ever in My Heart (1933) as Kennel Caretaker
- Female (1933) as Department Head (uncredited)
- The World Changes (1933) as Mr. Peterson
- Roman Scandals (1933) as Warren Finley Cooper
- East of Fifth Avenue (1933) as Dr. Morgan
- Lady Killer (1933) as Detective Conroy
- Two Alone (1934) as George Marshall
- Dark Hazard (1934) as Bill 'Billy' Fallen
- Heat Lightning (1934) as Everett Marshall
- Gambling Lady (1934) as District Attorney
- Whirlpool (1934) as Judge Jim Morrison
- Upperworld (1934) as Police Capt. Reynolds
- I'll Tell the World (1934) as Hardwick
- One Is Guilty (1934) as Wells Deveroux
- He Was Her Man (1934) as Police Captain (uncredited)
- Let's Talk It Over (1934) as Dr. Preston
- Wild Gold (1934) as Dam Boss (uncredited)
- Operator 13 (1934) as Capt. Channing
- Murder in the Private Car (1934) as Elwood Carson aka Hanks
- Here Comes the Navy (1934) as Executive Officer
- Housewife (1934) as Judge
- Have a Heart (1934) as Mr. Schauber
- Death on the Diamond (1934) as Cato
- Elinor Norton (1934) as Ranch Foreman (uncredited)
- Mills of the Gods (1934) as Thomas
- The Secret Bride (1934) as Representative Grosvenor
- Million Dollar Baby (1934) as Doctor
- Biography of a Bachelor Girl (1935) as Grigsby, the Process Server
- Transient Lady (1935) as Ed Goring
- Laddie (1935) as Mr. John Stanton
- Straight from the Heart (1935) as District Attorney
- Black Fury (1935) as Mr. J.J. Welsh
- Oil for the Lamps of China (1935) as Speaker
- Dante's Inferno (1935) as Inspector Harris
- The Virginia Judge (1935) as Plato Jones
- O'Shaughnessy's Boy (1935) as Dan Hastings
- His Night Out (1935) as J.J. Trent
- The Old Homestead (1935) as Uncle Jed
- Forced Landing (1935) as Martin Byrd
- Dangerous Waters (1936) as Bill MacKeechie
- Three Godfathers (1936) as Rev. McLane
- The First Baby (1936) as Dr. Clarke
- I Married a Doctor (1936) as Guy Pollock
- The Last of the Mohicans (1936) as Captain Winthrop
- The Gorgeous Hussy (1936) as Secretary Ingham
- The Man Who Lived Twice (1936) as Police Insp. Logan
- Wanted! Jane Turner (1936) as Walter Davies
- Winterset (1936) as Policeman in the Square
- That Girl from Paris (1936) as Immigration Officer (uncredited)
- Larceny on the Air (1937) as Inspector 'Mac' McDonald
- John Meade's Woman (1937) as The Governor
- Park Avenue Logger (1937) as Ben Morton
- The Go Getter (1937) as Matt Peasely
- This Is My Affair (1937) as George Andrews
- Roaring Timber (1937) as Harrigan
- Exclusive (1937) as Mr. Franklin
- Hot Water (1937) as Dr. Enfield
- The Last Gangster (1937) as Mr. Broderick (uncredited)
- Island in the Sky (1938) as Walter Rhodes
- Gangs of New York (1938) as Inspector Sullivan
- You and Me (1938) as Dayton
- Men with Wings (1938) as Col. Hadley
- Torchy Gets Her Man (1938) as Charles Gilbert
- Kentucky (1938) as Bob Slocum
- Jesse James (1939) as Clarke
- My Son Is a Criminal (1939) as Tom Halloran Sr.
- Union Pacific (1939) as Oakes Ames
- Heritage of the Desert (1939) as 'Nebraska'
- Each Dawn I Die (1939) as Lang
- Range War (1939) as Buck Collins
- Two Bright Boys (1939) as Clayton
- Main Street Lawyer (1939) as John Ralston
- The Cat and the Canary (1939)
- Remember the Night (1940) as Francis X. O'Leary
- My Little Chickadee (1940) as Uncle John
- Castle on the Hudson (1940) as Ragan
- Lucky Cisco Kid (1940) as Judge McQuade
- Brigham Young (1940) as Heber Kimball
- Northwest Mounted Police (1940) as Supt. Harrington
- The Monster and the Girl (1941) as Lieutenant Strickland
- I Wanted Wings (1941) as Judge Advocate
- Men of the Timberland (1941) as Tim MacGregor
- Texas (1941) as Rancher Wilson
- The Night of January 16th (1941) as Inspector Donegan
- Sullivan's Travels (1941) as Judge (uncredited)
- Juke Girl (1942) as Mister Just
- Wake Island (1942) as Col. Cameron (uncredited)
- No Time for Love (1943) as Construction Company President (uncredited)
- Air Force (1943) as Colonel at Hickam Field
- The Ox-Bow Incident (1943) as Sheriff Risley
- Background to Danger (1943) as 'Mac' McNamara
- Nine Girls (1944) as Capt. Brooks
- Along Came Jones (1945) as Luke Packard
- To Each His Own (1946) as Dr. Hunt
- Perilous Holiday (1946) as Graeme
- The Virginian (1946) as Judge Henry (uncredited)
- Renegades (1946) as Nathan Brockway
- Gallant Journey (1946) as Zachary Montgomery
- My Favorite Brunette (1947) as Prison Warden
- Deep Valley (1947) as Sheriff Akers
- Sitting Pretty (1948) as Mr. Ashcroft
- Fury at Furnace Creek (1948) as Gen. Leads
