= Sooky =

1931 film

- Theatrical release poster
- Directed by: Norman Taurog
- Screenplay by: Joseph L. Mankiewicz; Norman Z. McLeod; Sam Mintz
- Based on: Skippy comic strip by Percy Crosby
- Produced by: Louis D. Lighton
- Starring: Jackie Cooper; Robert Coogan; Jackie Searl; Willard Robertson; Enid Bennett; Helen Jerome Eddy
- Cinematography: Arthur L. Todd
- Production company: Paramount Pictures
- Distributed by: Paramount Pictures
- Release date: December 26, 1931
- Running time: 85 minutes
- Country: United States
- Language: English
- Budget: $370,000

Sooky is a 1931 American pre-Code adventure film directed by Norman Taurog and written by Joseph L. Mankiewicz, Norman Z. McLeod and Sam Mintz. It is a sequel to the 1931 film Skippy. The film stars Jackie Cooper, Robert Coogan, Jackie Searl, Willard Robertson, Enid Bennett and Helen Jerome Eddy. It was released on December 26, 1931, by Paramount Pictures.

== Cast ==
- Jackie Cooper as Skippy Skinner
- Robert Coogan as Sooky Wayne
- Jackie Searl as Sidney Saunders
- Willard Robertson as Dr. Skinner
- Enid Bennett as Mrs. Skinner
- Helen Jerome Eddy as Mrs. Wayne
- Guy Oliver as Mr. Moggs
- Harry Beresford as Mr. Willoughby
- Gertrude Sutton as Hilda
- Oscar Apfel as Krausmyer
- Tom Wilson as Officer Duncan
