= Skippy (peanut butter) =

American peanut butter brand

- Product type: Peanut butter
- Current owner: Hormel Foods
- Country: United States
- Introduced: 1932; 94 years ago
- Markets: Worldwide
- Previous owners: Joseph L. Rosefield; CPC International; Bestfoods Corporation; Unilever
- Website: www.peanutbutter.com

Skippy is an American brand of peanut butter manufactured in the United States and China. First sold in 1932, Skippy is currently manufactured by Hormel Foods, which bought the brand from Unilever in 2013. It is the best-selling brand of peanut butter in China and second only to the J.M. Smucker Company's Jif brand worldwide.

== Brand name ==
The name "Skippy" was trademarked in 1925 by Percy Crosby, creator of the popular "Skippy" comic strip (1923–1945), which had been adapted into the 1929 novel Skippy, the daytime children's radio serial Skippy (1932–1935), and the Oscar-winning 1931 film Skippy.

In 1932, the Alameda, California, food packer Joseph L. Rosefield began to sell Skippy. Crosby successfully had the trademark invalidated in 1934. Rosefield persisted using the name and after Crosby was committed to an asylum and after the passage in 1946 of the Lanham Act, Rosefield was granted rights to the trademark. Crosby's family repeatedly attempted to fight the company's use of Skippy.

== Product ==
In 1955, Rosefield sold the brand to Best Foods. Its successor companies, most recently Unilever and Hormel, claim rights to the trademark over the objection of Crosby's heirs, and much litigation has occurred on this point over the decades, some of which has continued into the 2000s.

Skippy is sold in many different sizes, including a 4-pound (1.8 kg) jar, known as the "Family Jar". In late 2000, Skippy reduced their standard jar size from 18 ounces (510 g) to 16.3 ounces (460 g) by adding a "dimple" in the bottom of the jar while retaining the jar's height and diameter.

Hormel discontinued the sale of Skippy peanut butter in Canada in 2017 due to declining profitability. The product is still sold in 60 countries, including China and the U.K. The Canadian recipe was slightly different, using 1-3 grams less sugar per jar than the U.S. version.

In the United States, Skippy labels the product "peanut butter spread" because of FDA regulations regarding peanut butter.

== Production ==
Skippy has factories in Little Rock, Arkansas, and Shandong Province, China. About 750,000 pounds (340,000 kg) of peanuts are brought daily to the Skippy Peanut Butter plant in Little Rock, Arkansas, resulting in over 3,500,000 pounds (1,600,000 kg) of peanut butter produced each week.

There are 14 different varieties of Skippy Peanut Butter Spread.

- Skippy Creamy Peanut Butter
- Skippy Super Chunk Peanut Butter
- Skippy Roasted Honey Nut Creamy Peanut Butter
- Skippy Reduced Fat Creamy Peanut Butter
- Skippy Reduced Fat Super Chunk Peanut Butter
- Skippy Peanut Butter Blended with Plant Protein Creamy
- Skippy Peanut Butter Blended with Plant Protein Chunky
- Skippy Creamy Peanut Butter Spread No Sugar Added
- Skippy Chunky Peanut Butter Spread No Sugar Added
- Skippy Natural Creamy Peanut Butter Spread
- Skippy Natural Creamy Peanut Butter Spread with Honey
- Skippy Natural Super Chunk Peanut Butter Spread
- Skippy Natural Super Chunk Peanut Butter Spread with Honey
- Skippy Natural Creamy 1/3 Less Sodium & Sugar Peanut Butter Spread

Skippy is also available in a 6 oz. squeeze pack in Creamy or Natural Peanut Butter Spread and 1.15 oz. individual squeeze 8 packs in Creamy or Natural Peanut Butter Spread.

In 2018, Skippy added Skippy P.B. Fruit Bites to their Skippy P.B. Bites that were already available in Double Peanut Butter, Pretzel and Graham Cracker.

On September 12, 2018, Skippy announced a new line of Skippy P.B. & Jelly Minis in Peanut Butter & Grape Jelly, Natural Peanut Butter & Grape Jelly and Peanut Butter & Strawberry Jelly.

== Nutrition ==
Skippy Peanut Butter is cholesterol-free and gluten-free. It contains sugar and hydrogenated vegetable oil (cottonseed, soybean and grapeseed oil) to prevent separation.

All varieties of Skippy Peanut Butter are also kosher except the Skippy P.B. bites.
