= Robert Coogan =

American actor (1924–1978)

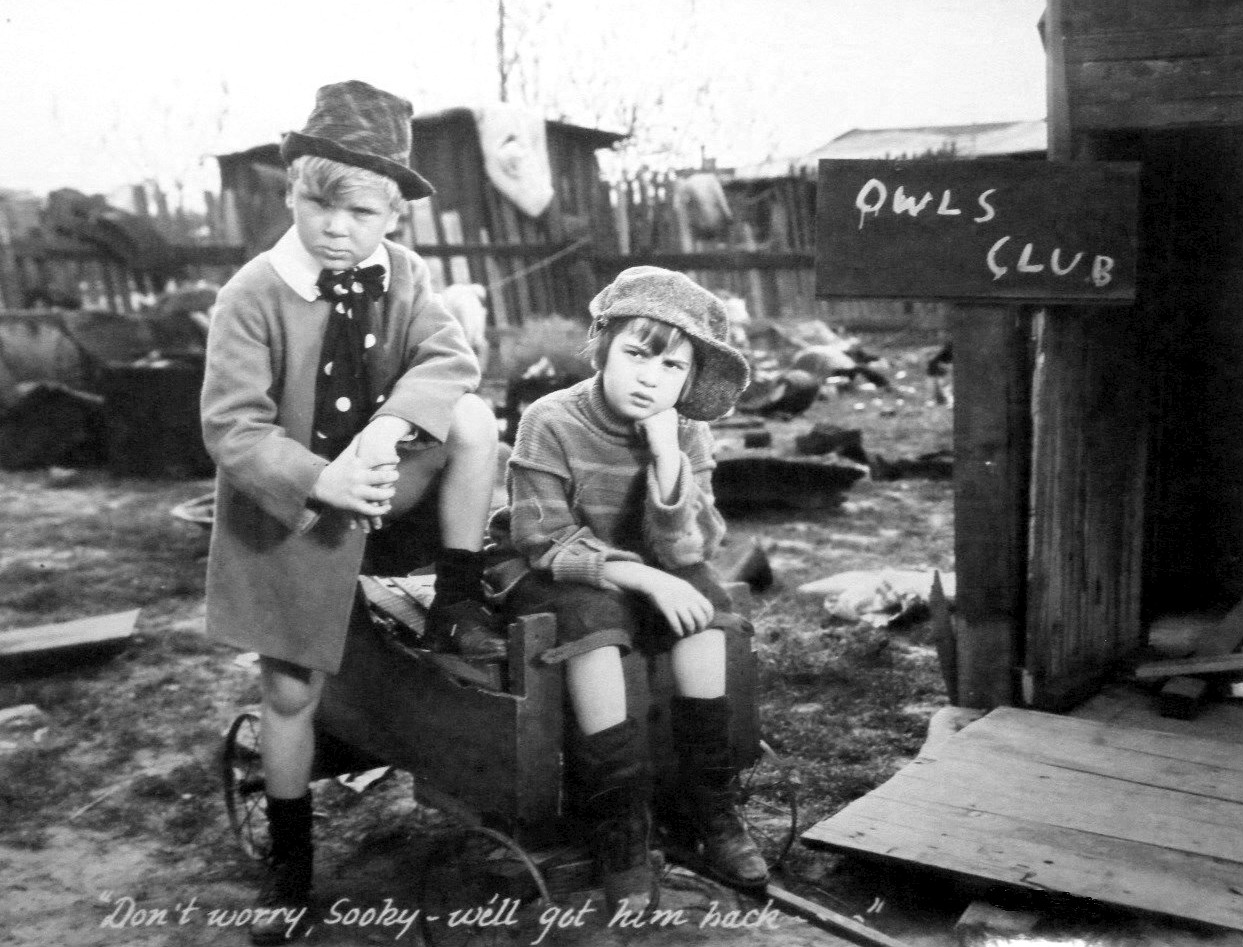
- Robert Coogan (right) with Jackie Cooper in Skippy (1931)
- Born: Robert Anthony Coogan; December 13, 1924; Glendale, California, U.S.
- Died: May 12, 1978 (aged 53)
- Occupation: Actor
- Years active: 1931–1962
- Relatives: Jackie Coogan (brother); Keith Coogan (grand-nephew)

Robert Coogan (December 13, 1924 – May 12, 1978) was an American film and television actor.

== Early life ==
Robert Coogan was born in Glendale, California, to parents Jack Coogan Sr. and Lillian Coogan. His older brother was Jackie Coogan, perhaps Hollywood's most famous child star of the 1920s.

== Career ==
Starting as a child actor, Robert Coogan made his film debut as Sooky in Skippy (1931), a comedy-drama family film which was nominated for an Academy Award for Best Picture. He also reprised the role of Sooky in its sequel Sooky (1931). In addition to his appearance in Skippy, Coogan appeared in over one dozen other films and made one appearance in a television production. Coogan continued acting in adulthood, but only with minor success. He portrayed the role of Humphrey Pennyworth in the Joe Palooka B-movies.

== Personal life ==
Coogan's only child is Jonathan Coogan. Coogan's nephew is stereographer and 3D producer Anthony Coogan and his grand-nephew Keith Coogan is also an actor.

== Filmography ==
Year	Title	Role	Notes
1931	Skippy	Sooky Wayne	
1931	Sooky	Sooky Wayne	
1932	The Miracle Man	Bobbie Holmes	
1932	Sky Bride	Willie Smith	
1942	Johnny Doughboy	Bobby Coogan	
1947	Kilroy Was Here	Soldier Cheer Leader	
1948	French Leave	Mack	
1948	Mater Minds	Young Man	
1950	Joe Palooka Meets Humphrey	Humphrey Pennyworth	
1950	Joe Palooka in Humphrey Takes a Chance	Humphrey Pennyworth	
1950	The Underworld Story	Henchman	Uncredited
1950	Joe Palooka in the Squared Circle	Humphrey Pennyworth	
1951	Ghost Chasers	Jack Eagan	
1952	Here Come the Marines	Marine Chef	
1959	General Electric Theater	Adolf Hitler	Episode: "Hitler's Secret"
1960	The Little Shop of Horrors	Tramp	Uncredited
1962	Third of a Man		Uncredited, (final film role)
