= Kilroy Was Here (1947 film) =

1947 film directed by Phil Karlson

- Theatrical release poster
- Directed by: Phil Karlson
- Screenplay by: Dick Irving Hyland
- Story by: Dick Irving Hyland; Lee Wainer
- Produced by: Dick Irving Hyland; Sidney Luft
- Starring: Jackie Cooper; Jackie Coogan; Wanda McKay; Frank Jenks; Norman Phillips Jr. Rand Brooks
- Cinematography: William A. Sickner
- Edited by: Jodie Copelan
- Production company: Monogram Pictures
- Distributed by: Monogram Pictures
- Release date: July 19, 1947
- Running time: 68 minutes
- Country: United States
- Language: English

Kilroy Was Here is a 1947 American comedy film directed by Phil Karlson and written by Dick Irving Hyland. The film stars Jackie Cooper, Jackie Coogan, Wanda McKay, Frank Jenks, Norman Phillips Jr. and Rand Brooks. It was released on July 19, 1947 by Monogram Pictures.

A promotional angle for this film and its sequel, French Leave, was the pairing of two former child stars with similar names. Coogan had been a child star in the 1920s while Cooper was a child star of the 1930s.

== Plot ==
After serving three years in the South Pacific, Johnny J. Kilroy and his trouble-making best friend, Pappy Collins, are honorably discharged from the Army and return to their jobs as taxi cab mechanics. They are soon fired, however, following a fight with their foreman, which Johnny instigates. Johnny, who has long been plagued by jokes about "Kilroy", the fictitious American soldier, then finds out that Pappy has been withholding a letter addressed to him, informing him that he has been accepted at Benson College on the G.I. Bill. Johnny angrily breaks from Pappy, but forgives him just before he is to leave for college. Upon arriving in Bensonville, Johnny moves into a cheap boardinghouse and discovers that he has a roommate, fellow student Elmer Hatch. Johnny quickly makes friends with Professor Thomas Shepherd, the uncle of one of Johnny's deceased Army buddies, and agrees to become his "new" nephew. Pappy then shows up at the boardinghouse, having gotten a job in town as a car salesman, and immediately gets Johnny into trouble when he steals a car and suggests to the unsuspecting Johnny that he drive it to campus. Johnny offers co-ed Connie Harcourt a lift, but is soon stopped by a police officer and arrested. After a disgusted Connie leaves without learning Johnny's name, Johnny is stuck at the jailhouse until Professor Shepherd, who happens to own the stolen car, secures his release. Later, Johnny, who has long dreamed of attending Benson, finds out from the registrar that he is one-half credit short for entrance and cannot enroll. While Johnny argues with the registrar, Pappy, who has come to school to apologize to his friend, runs into Connie as she is leaving Dean Butler's office. Seeing an opportunity to reingratiate himself with Johnny, Pappy tells Connie, who runs Benson's public relations office and is the editor of the school paper, that Johnny is the "Kilroy" and would be a great source of publicity for the school. Having been entrusted with improving Benson's image, Connie convinces Dean Butler to allow Johnny to make up the half-credit and remain in college. Connie then runs a story about "Kilroy" in the school paper. Although she has promised Pappy to keep Johnny's identity a secret and not reveal any part of their scheme to him, another student, Jimmy White, overhears her talking about him and rushes to tell his fraternity brothers about it. To Johnny's delight, the exclusive Delta Omega fraternity votes to pledge him as a new member and allows him to live at their house for free. Later, while Johnny and Connie are on a date, a photographer from the Bensonville paper takes Johnny's picture and publishes it with the caption "Pretender to Throne." When Pappy shows him the photo and confesses his and Connie's ruse, Johnny denounces both of them. After a mob of students burns "Kilroy" in effigy, the snobbish members of Delta Omega, led by senior Rodney Meadows, try to force him out of the fraternity by overworking him. Johnny, who is oblivious to their disdain, proves a tireless worker, however, and meets their every challenge. Johnny then forgives Pappy, but is still at odds with Connie, who accuses him of lying about his war experience. When Rodney and the others discover that Johnny is friends with Pappy and several taxi drivers, they conspire to embarrass him into withdrawing by inviting the underdressed blue collar workers to their pledge dance and then publicly deny that they know the cabbies. Outraged by the fraternity's duplicity, Pappy slugs Rodney, and a brawl ensues. Johnny is suspended for his part in the fight and, disheartened, decides to leave school for good. Determined to keep Johnny at Benson, Connie, who has since learned that Pappy was responsible for the "Kilroy" story, Elmer and Pappy bring him to one of Professor Shepherd's lectures and encourage him to have a talk with his mentor. Unknown to Johnny, his conversation with the professor is being broadcast over the lecture hall's public address system, and when the students hear his heartfelt words, they burst into applause and beg him to stay. With his dignity restored, Johnny elects to remain at Benson.

== Cast ==
- Jackie Cooper as John J. Kilroy
- Jackie Coogan as Pappy Collins
- Wanda McKay as Connie Harcourt
- Frank Jenks as Butch Miller
- Norman Phillips Jr. as Elmer Hatch
- Rand Brooks as Rodney Meadows
- Barton Yarborough as Prof. Thomas Shepherd
- Frank J. Scannell as 1st Cab Driver
- Patti Brill as Marge Connors
- Robert Coogan as Soldier Cheer Leader
- Joseph Forte as College Registrar
- Sid Melton as Joe
- Pat Goldin as Waiter
- Raymond Largay as Dean Butler
- Gil Stratton as Jimmy White
- William Edwin Self as Murdock
- Therese Lyon as Mother Dunlap
- Allen Mathews as Mike
- Eric Sinclair as Dick
- Jimmy Clark as Richard
- Gregg Barton as Guard
- Phil Arnold as Sugar Bowl Proprietor
- Nita Bieber as Waitress
- Stumpy Brown as Shorty
- George Hickman as Jack
