= French Leave (1948 film) =

1948 film directed by Frank McDonald

- Directed by: Frank McDonald
- Written by: Jack Rubin; Jameson Brewer
- Produced by: Sidney Luft
- Starring: Jackie Cooper; Jackie Coogan; Renee Godfrey
- Cinematography: William A. Sickner
- Edited by: Ace Herman
- Music by: Edward J. Kay
- Production company: Monogram Pictures
- Distributed by: Monogram Pictures
- Release date: April 11, 1948
- Running time: 63 minutes
- Country: United States
- Language: English

French Leave is a 1948 American comedy film directed by Frank McDonald and starring Jackie Cooper, Jackie Coogan and Renee Godfrey. It is the sequel to the 1947 film Kilroy Was Here and is sometimes known by the alternative title of Kilroy on Deck.

The film's sets were designed by the art director Dave Milton, one of the resident set designers at Monogram Pictures.

== Cast ==
- Jackie Cooper as Skitch Kilroy
- Jackie Coogan as Pappy Reagan
- Renee Godfrey as Mimi
- Ralph Sanford as Skipper Muldoon
- Robin Raymond as Simone
- Curt Bois as Marcel
- Larry J. Blake as Schultyz
- Charles La Torre as Fourcher
- William Dambrosi as Pierre
- John Bleifer as Pop LaFarge
- Claire Du Brey as Mom LaFarge
- George Lloyd as Captain Baker
- Frank J. Scannell as Francois
- Jimmy Cross as Riley
- Dick Winslow as Concertina Player
- Billy Snyder as Paul
- Manuel París as Gendarme
- Robert Coogan as Mack
- Vivian Mason as Lil
- Alphonse Martell as Waiter
- Pedro Regas as Seaman
- Jack Tornek as Barfly

== Bibliography ==
- Michael L. Stephens. Art Directors in Cinema: A Worldwide Biographical Dictionary. McFarland, 2008.
