= Sidney Luft =

American producer and businessman

- Born: Michael Sidney Luft; November 2, 1915; New York City, New York, U.S.
- Died: September 15, 2005 (aged 89); Santa Monica, California, U.S.
- Occupation: Impresario
- Years active: 1947–2004
- Spouses: MaryLou Simpson (m. 1940; div. 1942) Lynn Bari (m. 1943; div. 1950) Judy Garland (m. 1952; div. 1965) Patti Hemingway (m. 1970; div. 1971) Camille Keaton (m. 1993)
- Children: 4, including Lorna

Michael Sidney Luft (November 2, 1915 – September 15, 2005) was an American producer and businessman, the second husband of actress Lynn Bari, and later the third husband of actress and singer Judy Garland.

== Early life ==
Luft was born in New York City, the son of Leonora (Meyers) and Norbert Luft, who were Jewish immigrants from Russia and Germany. His family moved to Westchester County, where he grew up.

== Career ==
Luft was once an amateur boxer and bar-room brawler and had the nickname "One-Punch Luft". He was a pilot in the Royal Canadian Air Force and in the early 1940s was a test pilot for Douglas Aircraft Company.

Luft's first Hollywood assignment was as the secretary and manager of dancer Eleanor Powell. He is credited with keeping Judy Garland working and with setting up a deal with Warner Bros. to bankroll her comeback film, a 1954 musical remake of A Star Is Born plus future projects. Luft's name is on the film's credits as producer. A Star Is Born was a major critical success. During its first release, the picture proved to be very popular with audiences and grossed an enormous amount of money, but it failed to recoup its production costs. This was considered a major factor in Garland not winning the Academy Award that year for Best Actress. As a result, the studio canceled the Luft–Garland contract.

== Personal life ==
He was married five times:

- In December 1940 to aspiring actress MaryLou Simpson. They divorced in 1942.
- On November 28, 1943, to actress Lynn Bari. They had two children, a daughter who died shortly after birth and a son named John Michael Luft (born 1948). They divorced on December 26, 1950.
- On June 29, 1952, to singer and actress Judy Garland. They had two children, Lorna Luft (born November 21, 1952, in Santa Monica, California) and Joseph Wiley "Joey" Luft (born March 29, 1955, in Los Angeles). They separated in 1963 and divorced in 1965. Garland accused him of drunkenness, gambling indebtedness and abuse.
- In 1970, to Patti Hemingway (sometimes spelled Patty Hemingway). They divorced less than a year later.
- On March 20, 1993, to Camille Keaton.

== Death ==
Sidney Luft died on September 15, 2005, in Santa Monica, California, apparently of a heart attack, at the age of 89.

== Filmography ==
- 1947: Kilroy Was Here
- 1948: French Leave
- 1954: A Star Is Born
- 1955: Ford Star Jubilee (TV) (Episode: "The Judy Garland Special")
- 1956: General Electric Theater (TV) (Episode: "Judy Garland Musical Special")
- 1997: Judy Garland's Hollywood
