= Ruth Desmond =

American consumer advocate

Ruth Desmond (c. 1906 – September 30, 1988) was an American consumer advocate best known for her work to have the Food and Drug Administration increase the amount of peanuts in peanut butter. She was known as the "Peanut Butter Grandma".

Desmond founded the Federation of Homemakers in 1959 out of her home in Arlington, Virginia. She founded the federation in reaction to the fact that, during the cranberry crisis of that year, cranberry sauce was being sold (and consumed by her family) despite it being contaminated with a carcinogenic pesticide. She pushed government agencies to adopt food safety policies, including regulations on nitrates in baby food, additives in jelly beans, and caffeine in soft drinks.

Desmond once sued the United States Department of Agriculture for allowing hot dog manufacturers to place the words "all beef" and "all meat" on their labels even though they included other ingredients. After the court ruled in her favor, she telephoned the Justice Department and told them it would be an injustice if they appealed.

Desmond died September 30, 1988.
