= Percy Crosby =

American cartoonist

- Born: Percy Lee Crosby; December 8, 1891 Brooklyn, New York, U.S.
- Died: December 8, 1964 (aged 73) Kings Park, New York, U.S.
- Areas: Cartoonist, Writer, Artist
- Notable works: Skippy
- Spouses: Gertrude Volz (m. 1917; div. 1927) Agnes Dale Locke (m. 1929; div. 1939) Carolyn Soper (m. 1940)

Percy Lee Crosby (December 8, 1891 – December 8, 1964) was an American author, illustrator and cartoonist best known for his comic strip Skippy. Adapted into movies, a novel and a radio show, Crosby's creation was commemorated on a 1997 U.S. Postal Service stamp. An inspiration for Charles Schulz's Peanuts, the strip is regarded by comics historian Maurice Horn as a "classic... which innovated a number of sophisticated and refined touches used later by Charles Schulz and Bill Watterson". Humorist Corey Ford, writing in Vanity Fair, praised the strip as "America's most important contribution to humor of the century".

== Early life and career ==
Percy Crosby was born in Brooklyn, New York, prior to the 1898 incorporation of the five boroughs of New York City. He grew up in Richmond Hill, in what would be the borough of Queens but at the time was considered part of Long Island. His father, Thomas Francis Crosby, the son of Catholic immigrants from County Louth, Ireland, was an amateur painter who ran an art supply business. His mother Frances (née Greene), known as Fanny, was of English and Scottish descent. Percy had two younger sisters, Ethel and Gladys.

Crosby quit high school during his sophomore year to take a job as an art department office boy at editor Theodore Dreiser's magazine The Delineator. He was quickly promoted to artist, but the job ended after one issue. When he was 17, he sold a drawing to Life for $6. After delivering sandwiches and working as a magazine salesman, he found a position as an editorial cartoonist for the Socialist newspaper the New York Daily Call. There he published his first two comic strips, Biff and The Extreme Brothers—Laff and Sy, but readers became outraged at frivolity in the paper and the strips were pulled.

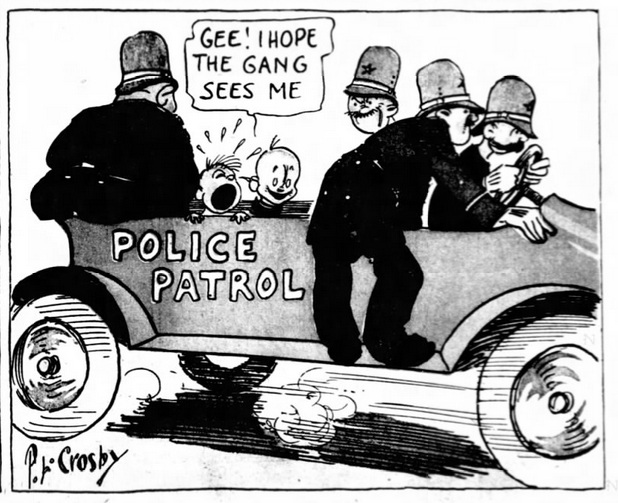
Panel from The Clancy Kids, 1919

Crosby next became a sports columnist and illustrator at The New York Globe. On the side, he produced comics used as occasional filler for the paper. Eventually fired, he entered an Edison Company contest for the best cartoon on the use of electric light. He won the $75 prize and saw his cartoon appear in every newspaper in New York City. The exposure led to a job at the New York World, "at the time the promised land for aspiring cartoonists". After a few years, he left to freelance, selling cartoons to World editor John Tennant. In 1916, the George Matthew Adams Service syndicated Crosby's first feature, the daily and Sunday strip The Clancy Kids, earning Crosby a respectable $135 a week.

While continuing on this first strip, Crosby studied at Manhattan's Art Students League under such instructors as George Bridgman, Frank DuMond, Joseph Pennell and Max Weber. The painter and League president Gifford Beal, recognizing Crosby's talent, invited him to spend the summer in Cape Cod, where Crosby made the acquaintance of Edwin Dickinson, Edward Hopper, Eugene O'Neill and other habitues of the Provincetown, Massachusetts artists colony. Back in New York, he fell in love with fellow League student Gertrude Volz, the artist-sculptor daughter of a well-to-do real-estate broker. After being commissioned a second lieutenant in the Officer Reserve Corps in 1916 and being called to active service the following year, serving for a time as a jiujitsu instructor, he and Volz eloped and were married at the training camp in Plattsburgh, New York, on July 7, 1917.

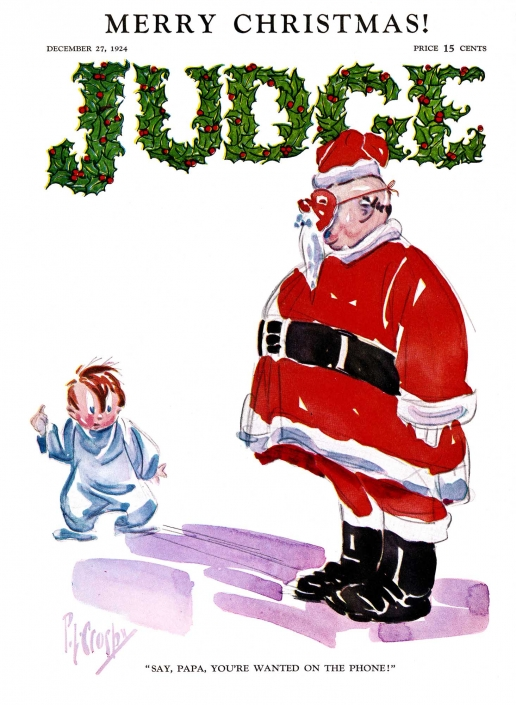
Cover art for Judge, 27 Dec 1924

While in training, Crosby created a daily comic panel, That Rookie from the Thirteenth Squad, for the McClure Syndicate, writing and drawing it from the front in France while serving as a first lieutenant in the 77th Division, AEF. The comic was collected into his first two books, That Rookie of the Thirteenth Squad (1917) and Between Shots (1919). While at the Argonne front, Crosby was struck by shrapnel in the eye, suffering no permanent damage, and earned the Purple Heart.

Following the war, he resumed his studies and syndicated a series of panel cartoons from 1921 to 1925. These covered a variety of subjects, with some series, such as Who Cares for the Feelings of a Small Boy, The Local Boy, Back o' the Flats, The Little Girl Who Moved Away and Send a Poor Child to the Farm, featuring children, particularly from the slums.

== Always Belittlin' ==
Percy Crosby's topper strip, Always Belittlin' (October 6, 1935), ran above Skippy

One such series, Always Belittlin', presaged Skippy with its star, a child with a striped shawl and a bonnet with a black pop-pom, whose thoughts consisted of the text's daily aphorism. This series and two others, Bugville and Bug Lugs, would eventually run as the supplemental topper feature accompanying the Skippy Sunday strip.

== Skippy (1923–45) ==
Crosby concurrently became a prolific contributor to Life, where several of his cartoons featured a child named Timmy, who became the prototype for Skippy Skinner when Crosby pitched art director Frank Casey about a regular feature. As Crosby recalled, "I drew up three pages and thought of forty-four names (among them Beanie and Jumper)—Skippy last on the list. A minor editor put his oar in and suggested Tiny Tim. I bristled with [sic] such uncalled-for interference, and... the thought flashed through my mind: '[The title] had to be Skippy and nothing else!'"

Following a full-page house ad in the March 15, 1923, issue, Skippy premiered in Life and quickly became a success. It became a syndicated comic strip two years later, initially by Johnson Features, Central Press Association and Editors Features Service, before publisher William Randolph Hearst signed Crosby to his King Features Syndicate. King distributed its first daily Skippy on October 7, 1926, and its first Sunday on April 1, 1929. Crosby retained the copyright, a rarity for strip artists of the time.

The strip focused on Skippy Skinner, a young boy living in the city. Usually wearing an enormous collar and tie and a floppy checked hat, he was an odd mix of mischief and melancholy who might equally be found stealing from the corner fruit stand, failing to master skates or baseball, complaining about the adult world, or staring sadly at an old relative's grave: "And only last year she gave me a tie."

The popular strip at one point guaranteed Crosby $2,350 a week, an enormous sum at the time. Crosby published a Skippy novel and other books; there were Skippy dolls, toys and comic books. The comic was adapted as the 1931 movie Skippy by Paramount Pictures. A hit, it won director Norman Taurog the Academy Award for Best Director, and boosted the career of young star Jackie Cooper, who played the title role.

Medal record

Art competitions

Representing the United States

Olympic Games
Silver medal – second place	1932 Los Angeles	Watercolors and drawings

From 1928 to 1937, Crosby produced 3,650 Skippy strips, ten books of fiction, political and philosophical essays, drawings and cartoons, as well as numerous pamphlets, while also mounting a dozen exhibitions in New York City, Washington, D.C., London, Paris and Rome of his oils, watercolors and other paintings and drawings. With its success, he befriended a pantheon of famed creators, including the author Marc Connelly, the humorist Robert Benchley, The New Yorker editor Harold Ross, Life magazine editor and future Pulitzer Prize-winning playwright Robert E. Sherwood, and the cartoonists and painters George McManus, H. T. Webster and Guy Hoff.

== Personal life ==
Crosby's marriage to Gertrude Volz had become strained during the 1920s, and after a few years of legal separation the two were divorced in 1927. She received custody of Patricia, their only child. Crosby later dated the torch singer and stage-musical actress Libby Holman and became friends with such actresses as Colleen Moore, Elsie James and Marilyn Miller. But during this time, making the rounds of speakeasies and night clubs, Crosby began developing an alcohol addiction. Crosby was a member of several private clubs—the Players Club, the Salamagundi Club, the Dutch Treat Club and the Coffee House Club at the Hotel Seymour, where he lived, dining with George Abbott, Jerome Kern, Ring Lardner, John Barrymore, Rube Goldberg, Heywood Broun and Frank Crowninshield. After nights at these clubs, he sometimes would awaken with no recollection of the previous evening.

Regardless, Crosby continued to explore numerous creative realms, writing Skippy prose vignettes for Life that led to a Skippy novel for G. P. Putnam's Sons. He fell in love with the secretary assigned to him, Vassar graduate Agnes Dale Locke, and the two were married on April 4, 1929. While on vacation in Europe, Crosby stopped drinking alcohol, becoming a teetotaler for the next seven years. Weathering the stock market crash of that fall, Crosby and his wife moved to McLean, Virginia, where Crosby bought an estate called "The Beeches". They later moved to an even larger estate in the area, "Ridgelawn". The couple would have four children: son Percy Jr., nicknamed Skippy, the eldest, and daughters Barbara, Joan, and Carol, who were, respectively two, three and four years younger. During this time, Crosby patented a firearm that incorporated a pistol in the stock of a rifle. With his wife and an agent handling his business affairs, Crosby oversaw a Skippy empire that included a radio show, three novels, a series of 34 posters for Standard Oil, and the aforesaid movie and a sequel, Sooky. To assist him on the Skippy strip, Crosby hired an old friend, artist Richard Reddy, who continued with him through the end of Crosby's career.

In the late 1930s, Crosby began drawing more overtly political and philosophical Skippy strips. Following his third Skippy prose-fiction book, the essay collection Skippy Rambles, Crosby began using his writing as primarily a vehicle for his beliefs. His 1931 memoir A Cartoonist's Philosophy was found to be too polemical for eight publishers, and Crosby published it himself, in a money-losing venture; his future books were all privately published under his own name or Freedom Press, which he founded in 1936. Life dropped him when Crosby agreed to do humorous cartoons only if the magazine agreed to publish his political work as well; the rival magazine Judge obliged. Of the nine books and pamphlets published from 1932 on, only Sports Drawings (1933) and the poetry collection Rays (1937) were not political or philosophical. Speeches, articles and cartoons would appear as paid ads in the Washington Herald, the Washington Post, The New York Times and the New York Sun.

Although he had voted for Franklin D. Roosevelt in the 1932 U.S. Presidential election, Crosby opposed Roosevelt's controversial Judiciary Reorganization Bill of 1937. Crosby's vitriolic editorials called the president "crazed for power", and referred to Roosevelt's Fireside Chats as "talking from the Moscow room of the Spite House". He also fired editorial broadsides at the gangster Al Capone. When the Internal Revenue Service brought a tax claim against Crosby and his corporation Skippy, Inc., for more than $67,000 in 1937, Crosby—who fought the decision for years, ultimately unsuccessfully—claimed it was in retaliation for his political writing.

The previous year, Crosby had begun drinking again, and his behavior became increasingly erratic. His marriage suffered, and after a violent episode in February 1939, Crosby left for Florida for two weeks. When he returned, repentant, his family had decamped, and his wife had filed for divorce. He never again saw his children, then aged five to nine. A devastated Crosby moved back to Manhattan and eventually entered Presbyterian Hospital for an extended stay for exhaustion and an infection. There he met nurse Carolyn Soper, whom he took on a first date to the 1939–40 New York World's Fair. The two were married in May 1940, and they honeymooned in Venice, Florida.

About the same time, a California food packer, Joseph Rosefield, began to sell his newly developed hydrogenated peanut butter, which he labeled "Skippy" without Crosby's permission. Years of expensive litigation followed, which Crosby's heirs have continued into the 2000s.

His finances, dire due to tax claims, the divorce settlement, legal fees, and alimony, Crosby sold Ridgelawn for a fraction of its value; his 1,500-acre (610 ha) farm and other Virginia real-estate were awarded to his second wife. His beloved strip Skippy suffered; as his biographer, Jerry Robinson, wrote:

The occasional diatribes in the Skippy strip became more frequent, more surreal. Some days were almost solid dialogue. In the past, Crosby had been able to move from one discipline to another—painting, writing, cartooning, and politics. Now, under extreme mental stress, the boundaries became blurred, and one intruded into the other to the detriment of all. … [A]fter long negotiations, Crosby and King Features were unable to agree on a new contract. On December 8, 1945, Crosby's fifty-fourth birthday, Skippy, aged twenty, died.

== Later years (1945–64) ==
In his later years, Crosby's alcoholism contributed to the cartoonist being unable to find employment. His wife Carolyn returned to work as a nurse and dietitian. Efforts to revive Skippy went nowhere.

In December 1948, Crosby was committed to the psychiatric ward of Bellevue Hospital after attempting suicide following the death of his mother. In January 1949, he was transferred to the mental ward at Kings Park Veterans' Hospital, in Kings Park, New York, where he was declared a paranoid schizophrenic. His confinement was authorized by Arthur Soper, an uncle of Crosby's wife.

Though he would spend the last 16 years of his life institutionalized, Crosby continued to produce artwork and manuscripts, though no work was published and it is uncertain how much was sent to publishers by the hospital staff, through whom all mail had to be vetted. Carolyn, a diabetic whose workday began at 5:30 a.m., was unable to obtain legal counsel or the help of friends to try to secure Crosby's release.

Crosby's estranged daughters Barbara and Joan had graduated from Vassar College, and Carol from the Rhode Island School of Design, without having known of their father's whereabouts; son Skip had become a geologist. Crosby had received infrequent visits from his two sisters, and from his cartoonist friend Rube Goldberg. Carolyn, whose failing health had eventually precluded visits, died November 8, 1959.

On December 8, 1964, after a heart attack that had left him in a coma for months, Crosby died in the asylum on his 73rd birthday. He was buried in Pine Lawn Veterans' Cemetery on Long Island.
