= Peanut butter =

Paste made from ground peanuts

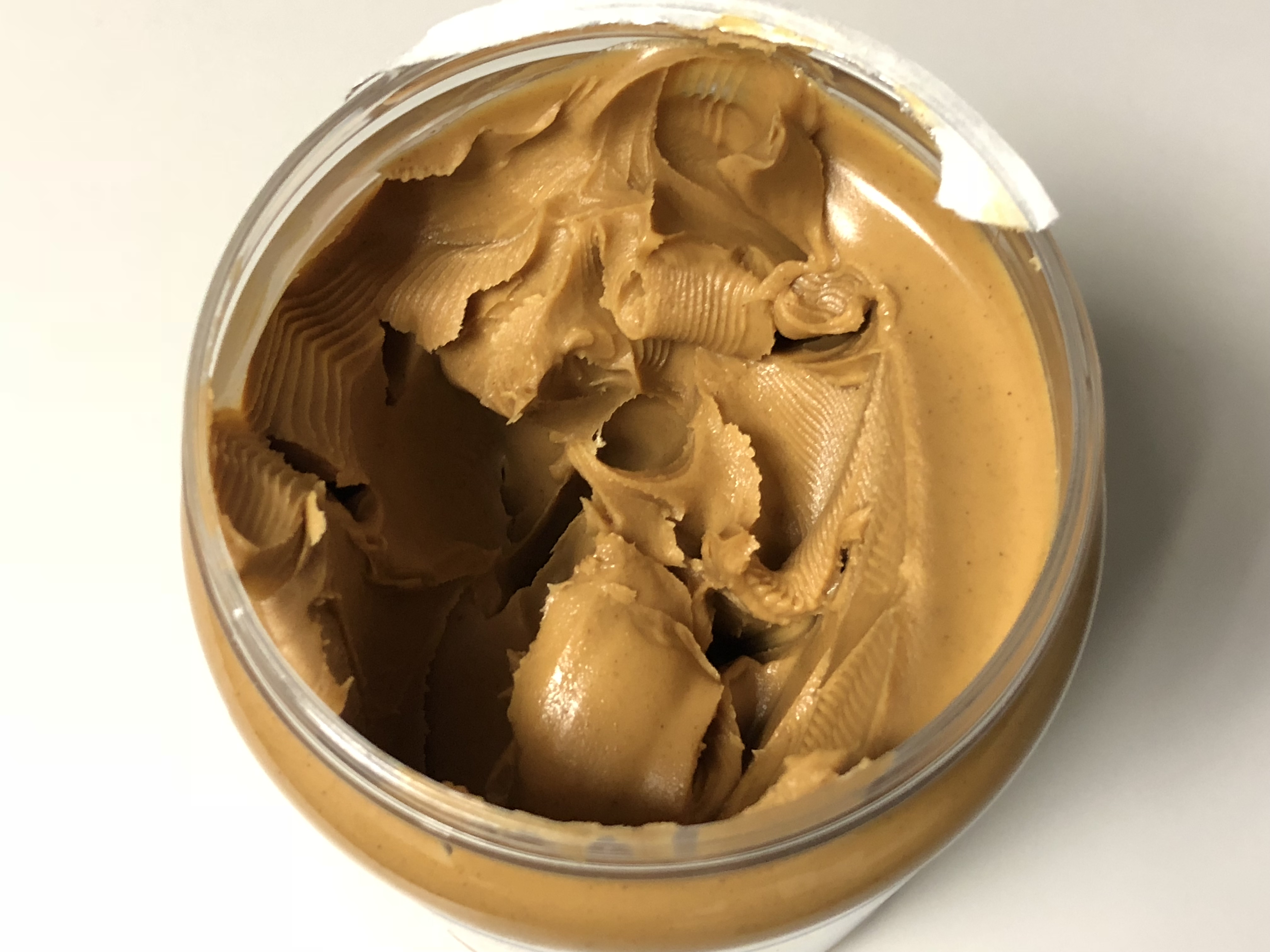
- "Creamy" peanut butter in a jar
- Type: Spread
- Main ingredients: Peanuts
- Ingredients generally used: Salt, sweeteners, and/or emulsifiers
- Variations: Crunchy, smooth
- Food energy (per 100 g serving): 597 kcal (2,500 kJ)
Nutritional value
(per 100 g serving)
- Protein: 22 g
- Fat: 51 g
- Carbohydrate: 22 g
- Similar dishes: Nut butter

Peanut butter is a food paste or spread made from ground, dry-roasted peanuts. It commonly contains additional ingredients that modify the taste or texture, such as salt, sweeteners, or emulsifiers. Consumed in many countries, it is the most commonly used of the nut butters, a group that also includes cashew butter and almond butter.

Peanut butter is a nutrient-rich food containing high levels of protein, several vitamins, and dietary minerals. It is typically served as a spread on bread, toast, or crackers and used to make sandwiches (notably the peanut butter and jelly sandwich). It is also used in a number of breakfast dishes and desserts, such as granola, smoothies, crepes, cookies, brownies, and croissants.

== History ==
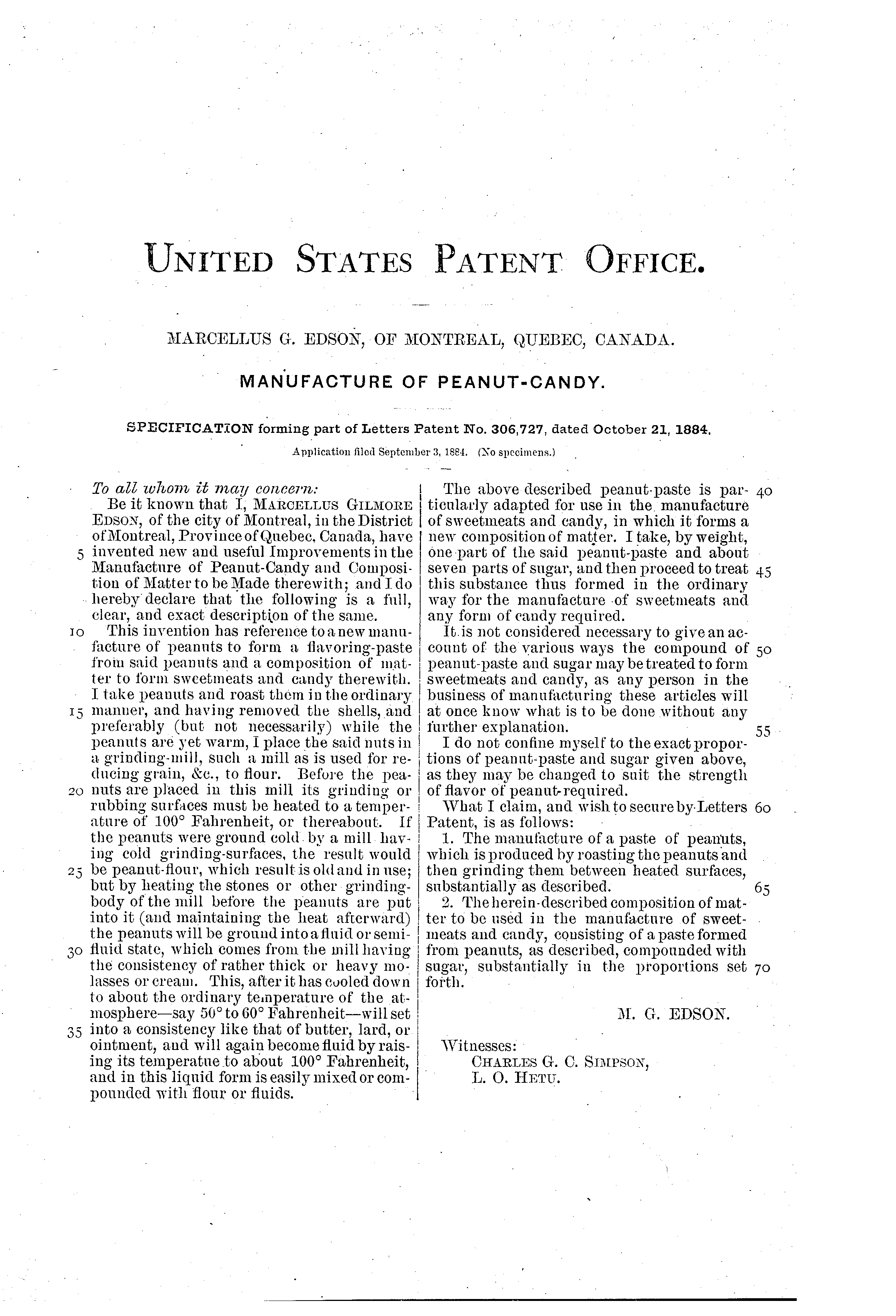
Patent for peanut butter

The earliest references to peanut butter can be traced to Aztec and Inca civilizations, who ground roasted peanuts into a paste. There are reports that 16th century Aztecs used peanut paste for aching gums.

Several people can be credited with the invention of modern peanut butter production processes. The U.S. National Peanut Board credits three modern inventors with the earliest patents related to the production of modern peanut butter. Marcellus Gilmore Edson of Montreal, Quebec, Canada, obtained the first patent for a method of producing peanut butter from roasted peanuts using heated surfaces in 1884. Edson's cooled product had "a consistency like that of butter, lard, or ointment" according to his patent application which described a process of milling roasted peanuts until the peanuts reached "a fluid or semi-fluid state". He mixed sugar into the paste to harden its consistency.

A businessman from St. Louis named George Bayle produced and sold peanut butter in the form of a snack food in 1894. By 1917, American consumers used peanut products during periods of meat rationing, with government promotions of "meatless Mondays" when peanut butter was a favored choice.

John Harvey Kellogg, known for his line of prepared breakfast cereals, was an advocate of using plant foods as a healthier dietary choice than meat. He was issued a patent for a "Process of Producing Alimentary Products" on May 24, 1898, and used peanuts, although he boiled the peanuts rather than roasting them. Kellogg's Western Health Reform Institute served peanut butter to patients because they needed a food that contained a large amount of protein that could be eaten without chewing. At first, peanut butter was a food for wealthy people, as it became popular initially as a product served at expensive health care institutes.

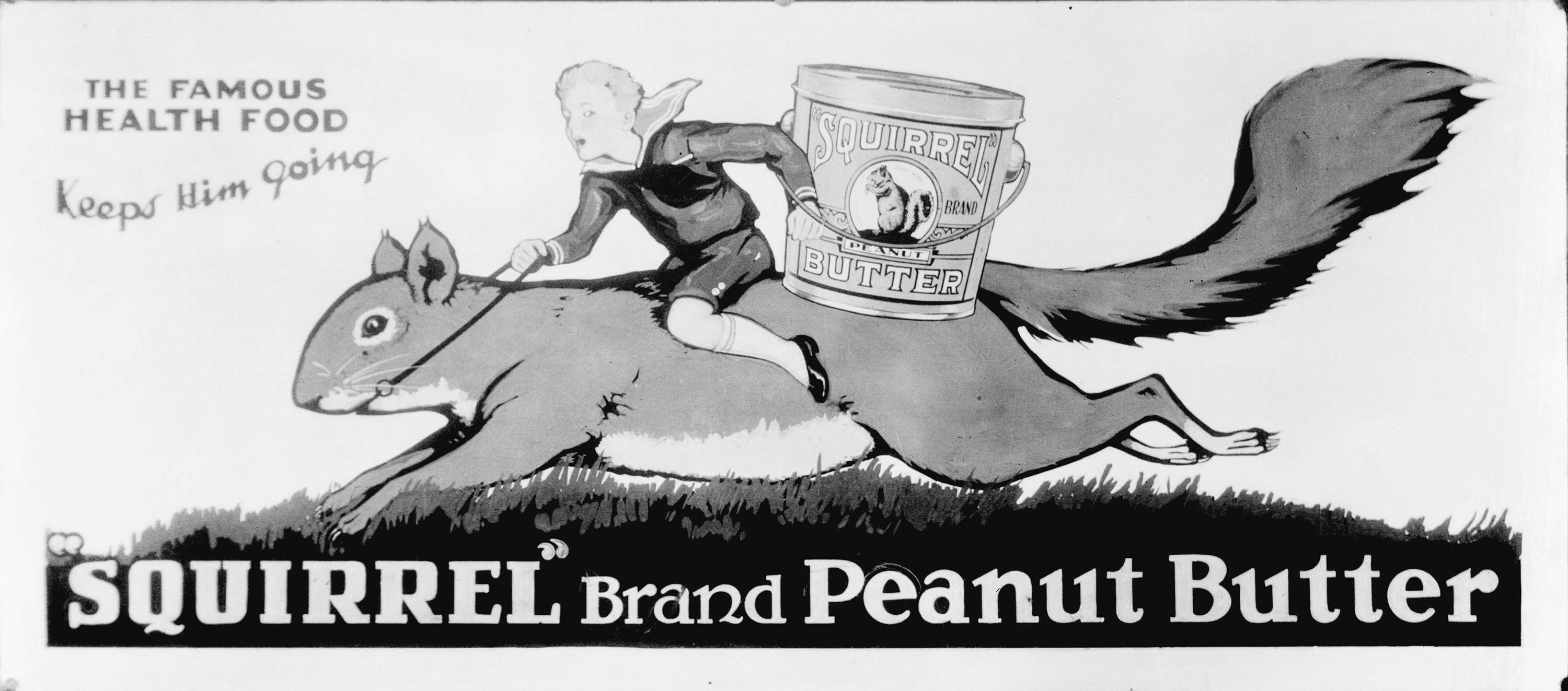
Squirrel peanut butter, 1927

Peter Pan peanut butter 1944 newspaper ad

Although often credited as its inventor, George Washington Carver did not invent peanut butter. By the time Carver published his document about peanuts, entitled "How to Grow the Peanut and 105 Ways of Preparing it For Human Consumption" in 1916, many methods of preparation of peanut butter had already been developed or patented by various pharmacists, doctors, and food scientists working in the US and Canada.

Early peanut-butter-making machines were developed by Joseph Lambert, who had worked at Kellogg's Battle Creek Sanitarium, and Dr. Ambrose Straub who obtained a patent for a peanut-butter-making machine in 1903.

In 1922, chemist Joseph L. Rosefield invented a process for making smooth peanut butter that kept the oil from separating by using partially hydrogenated oil; Rosefield licensed his invention to the company that created Peter Pan peanut butter in 1928. In 1932 he began producing his own peanut butter under the name Skippy. Under the Skippy brand, Rosefield developed a new method of churning creamy peanut butter, giving it a smoother consistency. He also mixed fragments of peanuts into peanut butter, creating the first "chunky"-style peanut butter. In 1955, Procter & Gamble launched a peanut butter named Jif, which was sweeter than other brands due to the use of sugar and molasses in its recipe.

In South Africa, the first peanut butter was produced in 1926 by Alderton Limited in Potgietersrus (now Mokopane), The product proved so popular that Tiger Brands (then Tiger Oats Company) took over the manufacture under the brand name Black Cat, which it still produces.

A related dish named pinda-dokkunnu ('peanut cheese' in Sranan Tongo) existed in Suriname by 1783. This was more solid than modern peanut butter and could be cut and served in slices like cheese. Pinda bravoe, a soup-like peanut-based dish, also existed in Suriname around that time. Peanut butter is referred to as pindakaas ('peanut cheese') in Dutch for this reason, as Suriname was a Dutch colony at that time. When peanut butter was brought onto the market in the Netherlands in 1948, it was not allowed to do so under the name peanut butter. The word butter was specifically reserved for real butter, to avoid confusion with margarine.

== Name ==
Similar to nut milks, nut butters and peanut butter are related to an equivalent dairy product that people are familiar with. Butter is a dairy product usually made from cow's milk and processed into a solid that can be spread on food. Although peanut butter is not solid at normal room temperatures, it is thick and spreadable.

A slang term for peanut butter in World War II was monkey butter.

== Types ==
Among the types of peanut butter are

- conventional peanut butter, which consists of up to 10% salt, sugars, and hydrogenated vegetable oil
- crunchy or chunky peanut butter, which includes coarsely-ground peanut fragments to give extra texture
- smooth or creamy peanut butter, in which the peanuts are ground uniformly, possibly with the addition of corn syrup and vegetable oil, to create a thick, creamy texture like butter
- natural peanut butter, which normally contains just peanuts and a small amount of salt, is sold without emulsifiers that bind the peanut oils with the peanut paste, so minor separation of oil and salt may occur; requires stirring to restore its creamy texture before consumption
- organic and artisanal peanut butter, whose markets are small; artisanal peanut butter is usually preservative-free, additive-free, and handmade in a cottage industry-style setup used first around 1970.
- powdered peanut butter, a lower-calorie alternate to traditional peanut butter, made by pressing roasted peanuts to remove most of the oil but still retaining protein and flavor; can be rehydrated with water to form a paste or added directly to smoothies, protein shakes, baking, and cooking.

== Production process ==
=== Planting and harvesting ===
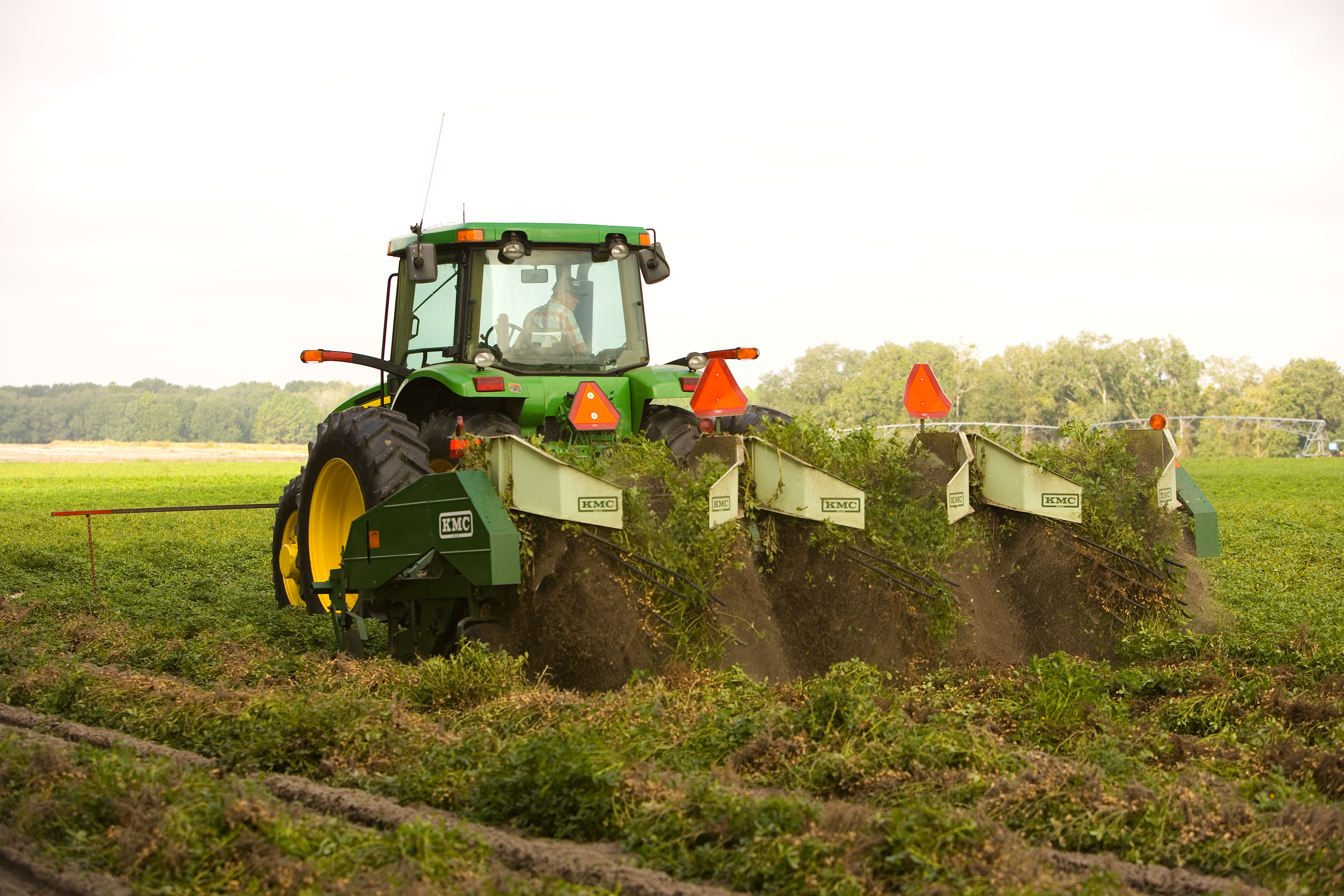
A tractor being used to complete the first stage of the peanut harvesting process

Due to weather conditions, peanuts are usually planted in spring. The peanut comes from a yellow flower that bends over and penetrates the soil after blooming and wilting, and the peanut starts to grow in the soil. Peanuts are harvested from late August to October, while the weather is clear. This weather allows for dry soil so that when picked, the soil does not stick to the stems and pods. The peanuts are then removed from vines and transported to a peanut shelling machine for mechanical drying. After cropping, the peanuts are delivered to warehouses for cleaning, where they are stored unshelled in silos.

=== Shelling ===
Shelling must be conducted carefully lest the seeds be damaged during the shell removal. The moisture of the unshelled peanuts is controlled to avoid excessive frangibility of the shells and kernels, reducing the dust in the plant. Afterwards, the peanuts are sent to a series of rollers set specifically for the batch of peanuts, where they are cracked. After cracking, the peanuts go through a screening process where they are inspected for contaminants.

=== Roasting ===
The dry roasting process employs either the batch or continuous method. In the batch method, peanuts are heated in large quantities in a revolving oven at about 800 °F (430 °C). Next, the peanuts in each batch are uniformly held and roasted in the oven at 320 °F (160 °C) for about 40 to 60 minutes. This method is good to use when the peanuts differ in moisture content. A hot air roaster is employed in the continuous method. The peanuts pass through the roaster while being rocked to permit even roasting. A photometer indicates the completion of dry roasting. Large manufacturers favor this method since it can lower the rate of spoilage and requires less labor.

=== Cooling ===
After dry roasting, peanuts are removed from the oven as quickly as possible and directly placed in a blower-cooler cylinder. There are suction fans in the metal cylinder that can pull a large volume of air through, so the peanuts can be cooled more efficiently. The peanuts will not be dried out because cooling retains some oil and moisture. The cooling process is completed when the temperature in the cylinder reaches 86 °F (30 °C).

=== Blanching ===
After the kernels have been cooled down, the peanuts will undergo either heat blanching or water blanching to remove the remaining seed coats. Compared to heat blanching, water blanching is a new process. Water blanching first appeared in 1949.

==== Heat blanching ====
Peanuts are heated by hot air at 280 °F (138 °C) for not more than 20 minutes in order to soften and split the skins. After that, the peanuts are exposed to continuous steam in a blanching machine. The skins are then removed using either bristles or soft rubber belts. After that, these skins are separated and blown into waste bags. Meanwhile, the hearts of peanuts are segregated through inspection.

==== Water blanching ====
After the kernels are arranged in troughs, the skin of the kernel is cracked on opposite sides by rolling it through sharp, stationary blades. While the skins are removed, the kernels are brought through a one-minute hot water bath and placed on a swinging pad with canvas on top. The swinging action of the pad rubs off the skins. Afterward, the blanched kernels are dried for at least six hours by hot air at 120 °F (49 °C).

After blanching, the peanuts are screened and inspected to eliminate the burnt and rotten peanuts. A blower is also used to remove light peanuts and discolored peanuts are removed using a color sorting machine.

=== Grinding ===
After blanching the peanuts are sent to grinding to be manufactured into peanut butter. The peanuts are then sent through two sizes of grinders. The first grinder produces a medium grind, and the second produces a fine grind. At this point, salt, sugar, and vegetable oil stabilizer may be added to the fine grind; this adds flavor and allows the peanut butter to stay as a homogeneous mixture. Chopped peanuts may also be added at this stage to produce "chunky" peanut butter.

=== Packaging ===
Before packaging, the peanut butter must be cooled to be sealed in jars. The mixture is pumped into a heat exchanger in order to cool it to about 120 °F (49 °C). The jars are then labeled and set aside until crystallization occurs. The peanut butter jars are then packaged into cartons and distributed to retailers, where they are stored at room temperature and sold to consumers.

A 2012 article stated that China and India are the first and second-largest producers of peanuts. The United States is the third-largest producer of peanuts. Georgia and Texas are the two major peanut-producing states, and more than half of the American peanut crop is used to make peanut butter.

== Consumption ==
The United States is a leading exporter of peanut butter and one of the largest consumers of peanut butter annually per capita. January 24 is National Peanut Butter Day in the United States. In March 2020 during the COVID-19 pandemic, retail sales of peanut butter in the United States increased by 75% over the level in March 2019.

According to Jon Krampner's 2013 book on peanut butter, per capita consumption of peanut butter in Canada and the Netherlands – the largest consumer per capita in Europe – exceeds that of the United States.

In Israel, the peanut-butter-flavored puffcorn snack Bamba accounts for 25% of the snack market; its consumption by infants has been linked to a low incidence of peanut allergies among Israelis.

== Health ==
=== Nutritional profile ===
Peanut butter, smooth style (survey)
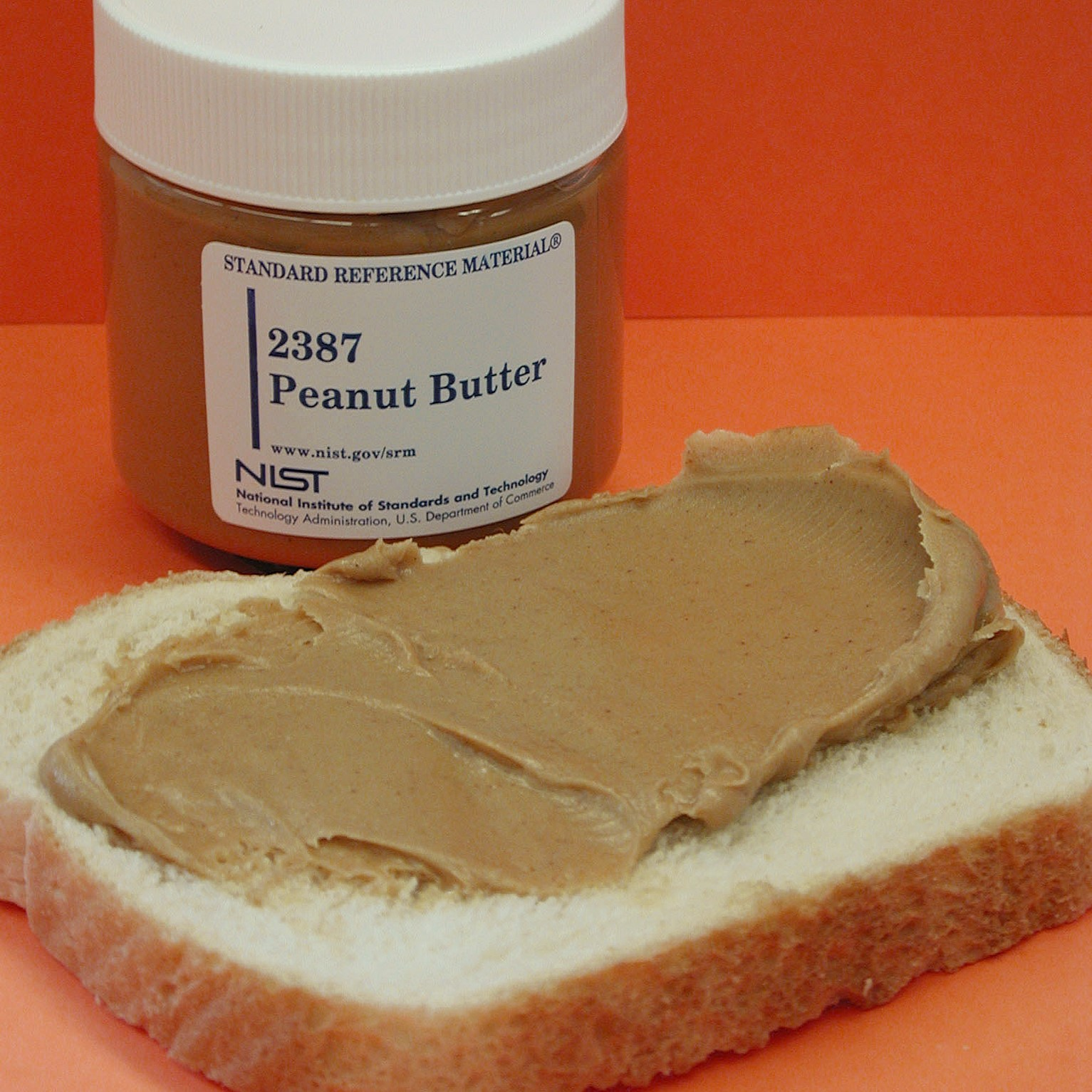
- NIST standard peanut butter

Nutritional value per 100 g (3.5 oz)
- Energy: 597 kcal (2,500 kJ)
- Carbohydrates: 22.3 g
- Starch: 4.8 g
- Sugars: 10.5 g
- Dietary fiber: 4.8 g
- Fat: 51.1 g
- Saturated: 10.1
- Monounsaturated: 25.4
- Polyunsaturated: 12.3
- Protein: 22.5 g
Vitamins and minerals
Vitamins	Quantity %DV^{†}
Vitamin A equiv.	0% 0 μg
Thiamine (B1)	12% 0.138 mg
Riboflavin (B2)	15% 0.191 mg
Niacin (B3)	83% 13.3 mg
Pantothenic acid (B5)	22% 1.1 mg
Vitamin B6	26% 0.44 mg
Folate (B9)	22% 86 μg
Vitamin C	0% 0 mg
Vitamin E	61% 9.1 mg
Vitamin K	0% 0.3 μg
Minerals	Quantity %DV^{†}
Calcium	4% 49 mg
Copper	47% 0.42 mg
Iron	9% 1.7 mg
Magnesium	40% 169 mg
Manganese	65% 1.5 mg
Phosphorus	27% 339 mg
Potassium	19% 564 mg
Selenium	7% 4.1 μg
Sodium	19% 429 mg
Zinc	23% 2.54 mg
- Other constituents: Quantity
- Water: 1.1 g
- Link to USDA Database entry
- ^{†}Percentages estimated using US recommendations for adults, except for potassium, which is estimated based on expert recommendation from the National Academies.

In a 100 gram amount, smooth peanut butter supplies 597 calories and is composed of 51% fat, 22% protein, 22% carbohydrates (including 5% dietary fiber), and 1% water (table). Both crunchy and smooth peanut butter are sources of saturated and monounsaturated fats (mainly oleic acid) as 25% of total serving amount, and polyunsaturated fat (12% of total), primarily as linoleic acid).

Peanut butter is a rich source (20% or more of the Daily Value, DV) of dietary fiber, vitamin E, pantothenic acid, folate, niacin, and vitamin B_{6} (table, USDA FoodData Central). Also high in content are the dietary minerals manganese, magnesium, phosphorus, zinc, copper, and sodium (added as salt during manufacturing). Peanut butter is a moderate source (10–19% DV) of thiamin, riboflavin, iron, and potassium (table).

=== Peanut allergy ===
For people with a peanut allergy, peanut butter can cause a variety of possible allergic reactions, including life-threatening anaphylaxis. This potential effect has led to banning peanut butter, among other common foods, in some schools.

Symptoms include:

- Shortness of breath
- Wheezing
- Tightening of the throat
- Itching
- Skin reactions such as hives and swelling
- Digestive problems

== Uses ==
=== As an ingredient ===
Peanut butter's flavor combines well with other flavors, such as oatmeal, cheese, cured meats, savory sauces, and various breads and crackers. The creamy or crunchy, fatty, salty taste pairs very well with complementary soft and sweet ingredients like fruit preserves, bananas, apples, chocolate, and honey. The taste can also be enhanced by similarly salty things like bacon.

One snack for children is called "ants on a log", with a celery stick acting as the "log". The groove in the celery stick is filled with peanut butter and raisins arranged in a row along the top are "ants".

Plumpy'nut is a peanut butter-based food used to fight malnutrition in famine-stricken countries. A single pack contains 500 calories, can be stored unrefrigerated for two years, and requires no cooking or preparation.

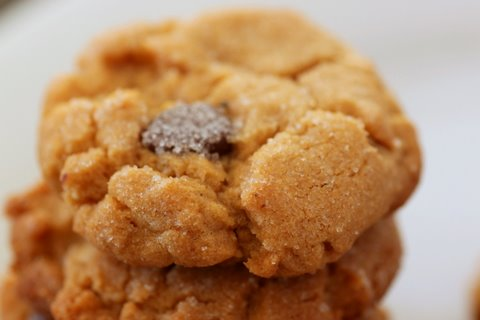
Peanut butter cookies, a popular type of cookie made from peanut butter and other ingredients

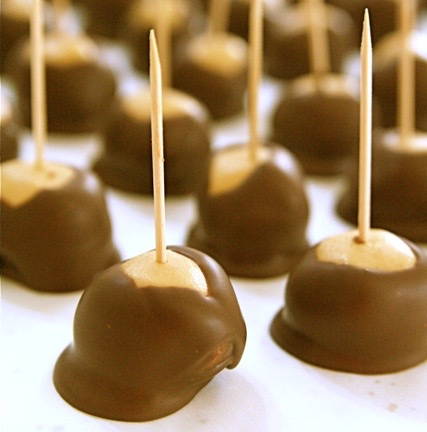
Buckeyes, a type of peanut-butter-based confectionery product

A peanut butter making machine in Bengaluru (2026)

=== As animal food ===
Peanut butter inside a hollow chew toy is a method to occupy a dog with a flavored treat. A common outdoor bird feeder is a coating of peanut butter on a pine cone with an overlying layer of bird seed.

=== In treating malnutrition ===
Plumpy'nut, a ready-to-use therapeutic food that is a peanut paste with other contents such as milk solids, is considered highly effective in treating child malnutrition. It is approved by the World Health Organisation as a highly successful alternative to refeeding. It has a shelf life of two years.

== Physical properties ==
Peanut butter is a viscoelastic food that exhibits both solid and fluid behaviors. Its characteristics—soft texture, spreadability, grittiness, etc.—can be more accurately defined through rheology.

== See also ==
- List of peanut dishes – includes dishes that use peanut butter as a main ingredient
- List of spreads
- Ruth Desmond, "Peanut Butter Grandmother"
