= Skippy (film) =

1931 film

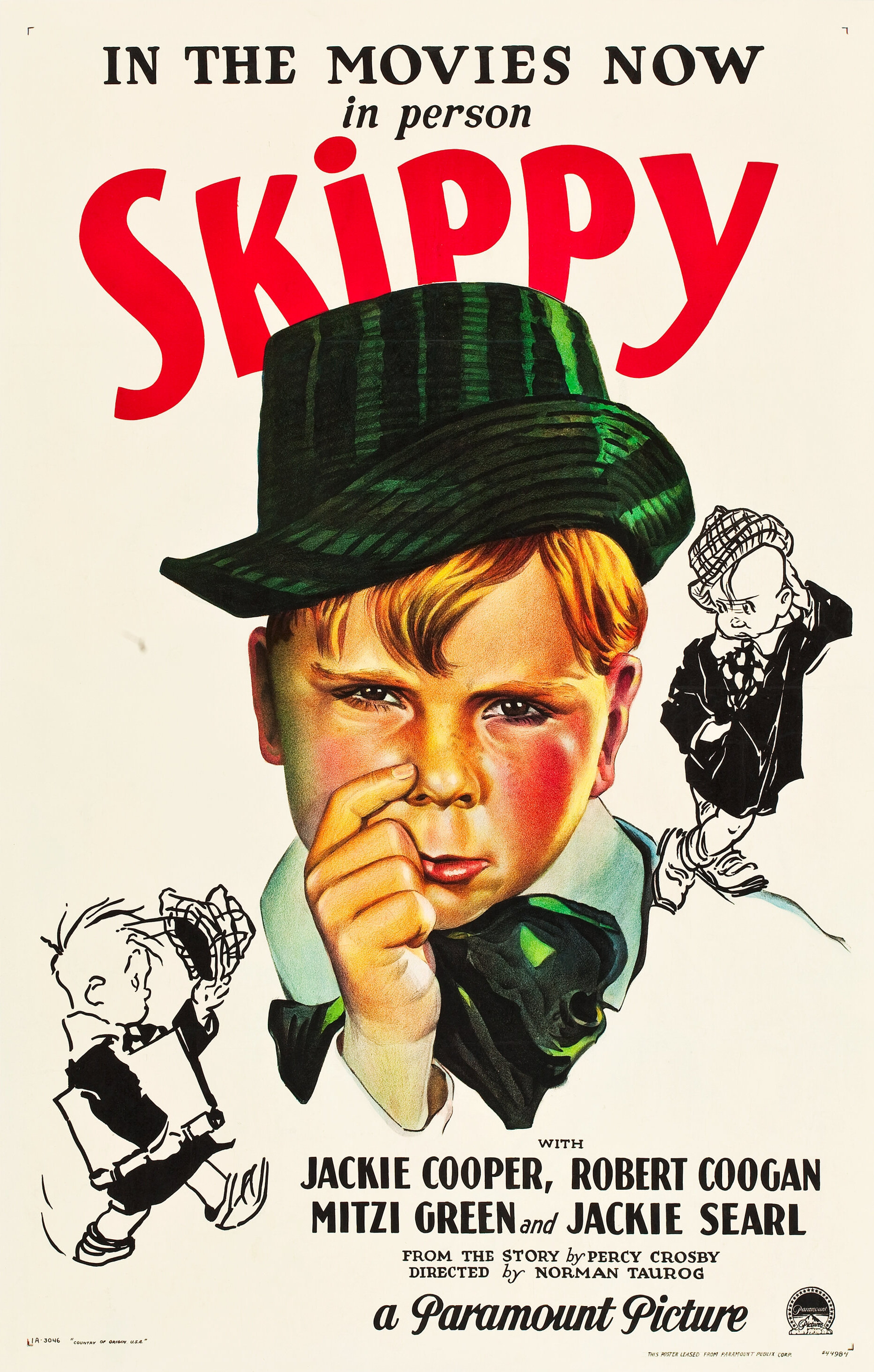
- Theatrical release poster
- Directed by: Norman Taurog
- Written by: Norman McLeod; Joseph L. Mankiewicz; Don Marquis; Sam Mintz
- Based on: Skippy comic strip by Percy Crosby
- Produced by: Adolph Zukor; Jesse L. Lasky; B. P. Schulberg
- Starring: Jackie Cooper; Robert Coogan; Mitzi Green; Jackie Searl
- Cinematography: Karl Struss
- Music by: John Leipold
- Distributed by: Paramount Pictures
- Release date: April 5, 1931
- Running time: 85 minutes
- Country: United States
- Language: English

Skippy is a 1931 American pre-Code comedy film based on the popular comic strip and novel Skippy by Percy Crosby. The screenplay was by Joseph L. Mankiewicz, Don Marquis, Norman Z. McLeod, and Sam Mintz.

The film stars Jackie Cooper in the title role, Robert Coogan, Mitzi Green and Jackie Searl. Director Norman Taurog won the Academy Award for Best Director (at age 32, he remained the youngest winner in this category until Damien Chazelle won for the 2016 film La La Land). The film also did well enough to inspire a sequel called Sooky (1931). Skippy was released on April 5, 1931, by Paramount Pictures. For his performance, Cooper, at the age of nine, became the youngest person to earn an Academy Award nomination for Best Actor in a Leading Role. The film was also nominated for the Academy Award for Best Picture.

== Plot ==
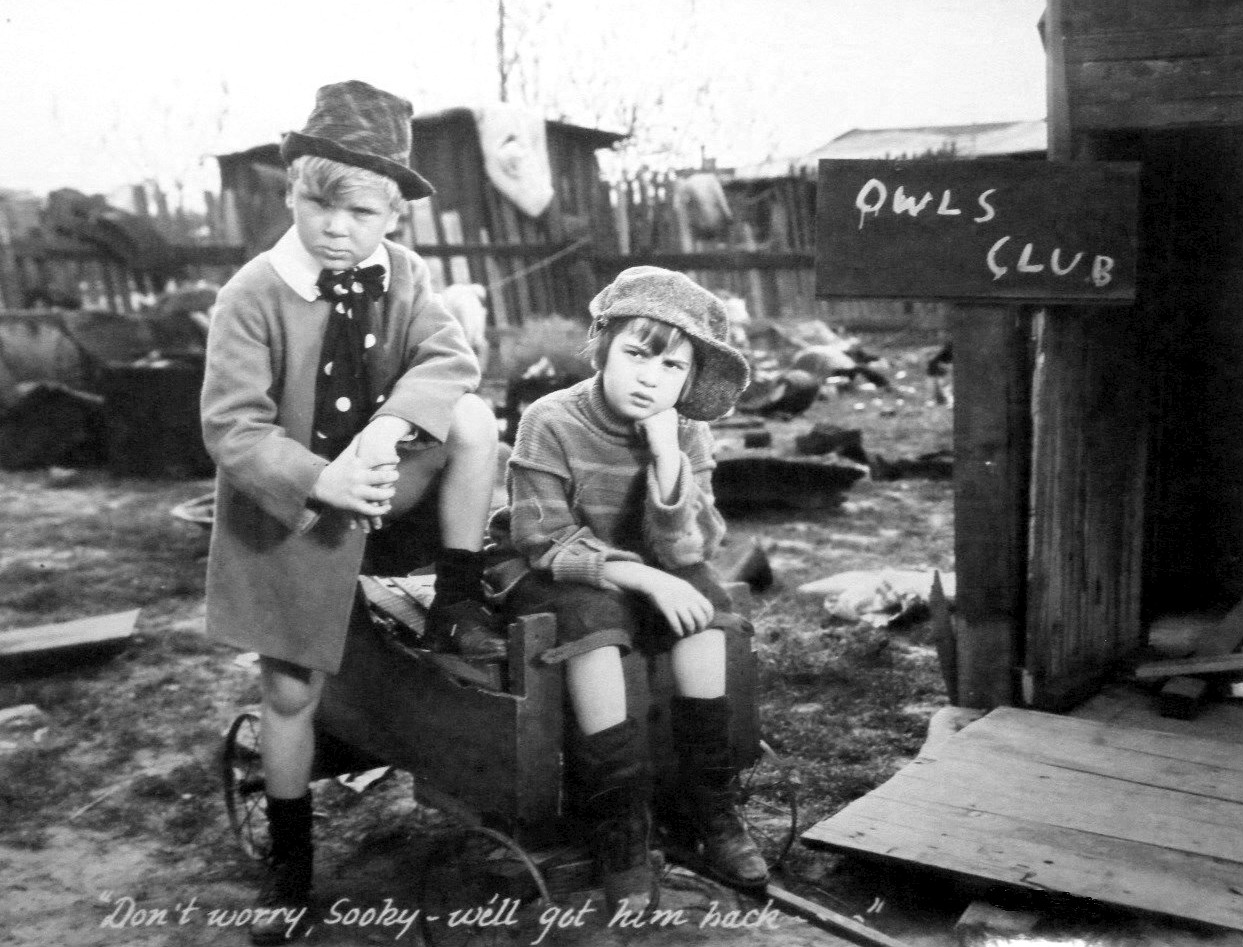
Jackie Cooper and Robert Coogan in Skippy

Skippy is the feisty son of the strict Dr. Herbert Skinner and his wife Ellen who live in Morrisville, Indiana. Skinner forbids Skippy to play in the pauperized Shantytown, because of its filth and criminal surroundings. Regardless, Skippy and his friend Sidney visit Shantytown, where Skippy meets a new boy named Sooky. He saves Sooky from the bully Harley Nubbins, and Skippy and Sooky become friends.

One day, Harley accidentally breaks his father's windshield with Skippy's yo-yo. Harley, whose father is brutish and aggressive, blames the damage on Skippy and Sooky. Mr. Nubbins, who works as a dogcatcher, takes Sooky's dog and demands the two boys pay for the damages if they want their dog back. Skippy and Sooky gather three dollars by breaking Skippy's savings bank, but Mr. Nubbins accepts it only for his windshield. He gives them three days to obtain another three dollars for a dog license, and he threatens to kill their dog if they don't get him the money.

Sooky and Skippy spend the next two days selling bottles, lemonade and wood, and staging a performance to earn money, but Skippy's father doesn't want to lend them the remaining thirty cents. Mr. Nubbins kills the dog and Skippy blames his father. The next morning, Skippy gets a new bicycle from his father but trades it to his friend, Eloise, for her new dog. He then takes the dog to Sooky. Dr. Skinner has a change of heart and buys Sooky a licensed dog, finds his mother a job, and refrains from ordering Shantytown destroyed, instead offering assistance to its citizens. For the first time, Dr. Skinner plays with Skippy in Shantytown. There they accidentally break Mr. Nubbins' new windshield. Dr. Skinner wins a fight against Mr. Nubbins and shows he is a good father.

== Cast ==
- Jackie Cooper as Skippy Skinner
- Robert Coogan as Sooky Wayne
- Mitzi Green as Eloise
- Jackie Searl as Sidney
- Willard Robertson as Dr. Herbert Skinner
- Enid Bennett as Mrs. Ellen Skinner
- Donald Haines as Harley Nubbins
- Jack Rube Clifford as Mr. Nubbins, Dog-Catcher
- Helen Jerome Eddy as Mrs. Wayne
- Guy Oliver as Dad Burkey

== Production ==
In the scene where the dog dies, director Norman Taurog needed to get his nephew, Jackie Cooper, to cry, so he told young Jackie he was going to kill his own dog by dragging the dog off set (with the assistance of Cooper's grandmother) and then having a security guard "shoot" the dog. Cooper did the scene, but despite finding the dog was not harmed, he was still hysterical for hours afterward to the point of needing a sedative.

== Reception ==
Skippy received positive reviews from critics. On Rotten Tomatoes, the film holds an approval rating of 86%, based on 7 reviews.
