= O'Shaughnessy's Boy =

1935 film by Richard Boleslawski

- Directed by: Richard Boleslawski
- Written by: Harvey Gates; Malcolm Stuart Boylan; Leonard Praskins; Wanda Tuchock; Otis Garrett
- Produced by: Phil Goldstone
- Starring: Wallace Beery; Jackie Cooper; Spanky McFarland
- Cinematography: James Wong Howe
- Edited by: Frank Sullivan
- Music by: William Axt
- Production company: Metro-Goldwyn-Mayer
- Distributed by: Loew's, Inc.
- Release date: 1935
- Running time: 87 mins
- Country: United States
- Language: English

O'Shaughnessy's Boy is a 1935 film starring Wallace Beery and Jackie Cooper and directed by Richard Boleslawski. The picture was partly set in a circus. The cinematographer was James Wong Howe.

== Plot summary ==
Captain Michael "Windy" O'Shaughnessy is an animal trainer with the Hastings Bros. Circus. His wife is Cora, a trapeze artist. The couple have one son, Stubby.

Windy's disapproving sister-in-law, Martha Shields, persuades Cora, to leave him and take Stubby. When Windy discovers that they have disappeared with his money, he begins searching for Stubby. To pay a private investigator, he attempts a dangerous fire trick with a tiger, but the distracted Windy is attacked and loses an arm.

Years later, circus owner Dan Hastings finds Windy and tells him that Cora has died in a trapeze accident and Stubby is living at a school. Windy is permitted to take the older Stubby for a three-month visit, but the boy initially despises him because Martha has blamed Windy for Cora's death. After Windy explains what happened, father and son gradually become close.

Martha seeks custody of Stubby, arguing that Windy cannot provide him with a stable home. Windy therefore returns to the circus and persuades Hastings to let him resume his tiger act. As Windy prepares to perform, Martha arrives to take Stubby away. Stubby escapes from her and rushes to the circus ring, where his presence gives Windy the confidence to complete the dangerous act successfully. Afterward, Stubby declares that he wants to remain with his father.

== Cast ==
- Wallace Beery as Windy O'Shaughnessy
- Jackie Cooper as Stubby O'Shaughnessy
- George "Spanky" McFarland as Stubby O'Shaughnessy (child)
- Henry Stephenson as Major Bigelow
- Sara Haden as Aunt Martha Shields (billed as Sarah Haden)
- Leona Maricle as Cora O'Shaughnessy
- Willard Robinson as Dan Hastings
- Clarence Muse as Jeff

== Critical reception ==
Andre Sennwald of The New York Times described the film as a "tear festival" and wrote, "Richard Boleslawsky catches the gaudy flavor of the tinsel and sawdust in accepted romantic style. A tortuous tale, it winds funereally through a whole decade in the life of Mr. O'Shaughnessy, and the photoplay makes the mistake of prolonging the grief past the saturation point." He commented favourably on some of the supporting performers, and commented, "Spanky McFarland ... has a hint of impishness in his character that adds spice to his usual portrait of round-eyed innocence. There is a sunny performance by Clarence Muse and a sinister one by Sarah Haden, the evil genius of the picture."

Variety wrote, "An excellent production and exceptionally good directlon results in a picture that will be accepted by those who know their circus. It is accurate and convincing. Indeed, the only major fault with this is that all concerned failed to realize that Jackie is getting too old to be a crybaby any longer." They also offered positive comments for the performances, writing that it was one of the best opportunities yet given to Wallace Beery, Jackie Cooper "comes through" in spite of the excessive crying, Sara Haden "takes the real acting honors", Spanky McFarland "is surprisingly good", Clarence Muse's contribution is "far more important than the authors probably intended" and Henry Stephenson "shines."

In their December, 1935 edition, Modern Screen gave the film a three-star review and wrote, "Here is what might be termed a two-man show, for almost all the footage is given over to the histrionics of those two established pals, Wallace Beery and Jackie Cooper. You know them, man and boy, from The Champ, and you wept quite a bit over them. Let the weeping now begin anew, for they’re back together again in another of those father-son epics which promises to be even more lachrymose than their former effort."
