= Joseph L. Rosefield =

American businessman (1882–1958)

Joseph Louis Rosefield (18 Dec 1882 - 8 Nov 1958) was formerly employed at Old Kentucky Liquor Company by his German-Jewish father, Manuel Rosenfield, in Cripple Creek, Colorado, married Mae Sutherland, then moved family and distillery to Denver, Colorado, and then to Alameda, California becoming a food and icebox salesman, later inventing a hydrogenated peanut butter circa 1923.

His business, the Rosefield Packing Company, was based at 1916 Webster Street, Alameda. His new production process was licensed to another company to make Peter Pan peanut butter in 1923. Rosefield Packing later marketed Skippy peanut butter in 1932; both brands are still sold today. It also introduced cylindrical "wide-mouth" jars for peanut butter in 1935. Peanut butter then became a vast food industry. Among other roles, Rosefield Packing provided emergency supplies of peanut butter to Hawaii during World War II. Rosefield's family sold Rosefield Packing and the Skippy brand to Best Foods in 1955.

Forms of peanut butter were already popular before Rosefield's innovation. The problem was that the oil separated from the peanut grit and did not keep. Rosefield's patented homogenization solution was to partially hydrogenate the peanut oil to make it more miscible with the peanuts. (In other words, he used a similar process as vegetable shortening to process the peanut oil for the recipe.) This also made it possible to churn the peanut butter to a creamy consistency. His company promised a one-year shelf life for the product and claimed that it tasted better and was less sticky than previous formulas.
