= Jackie Cooper =

American actor and director (1922–2011)

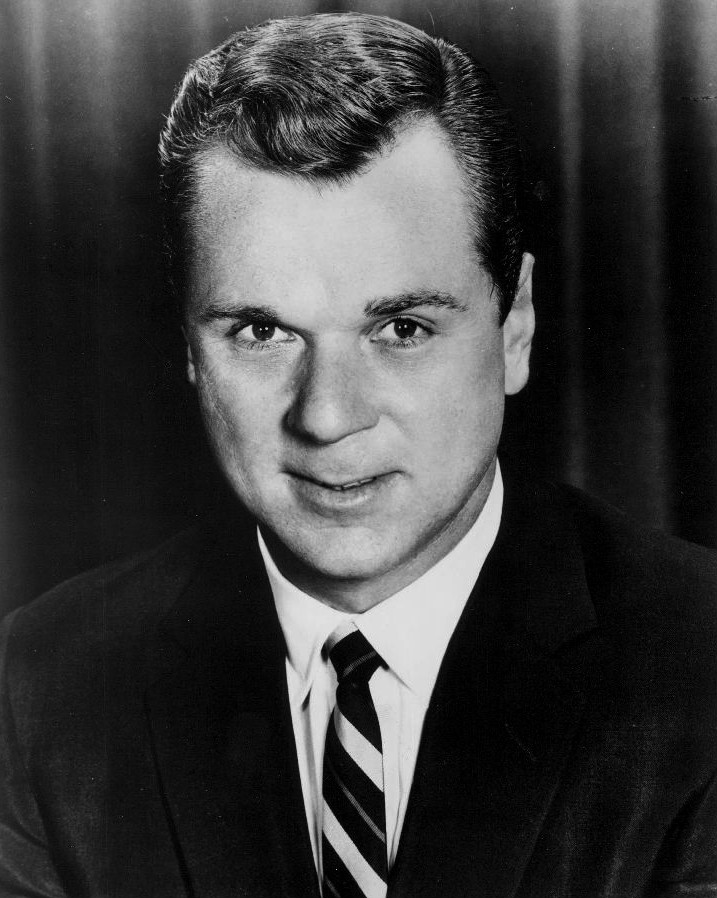
- Cooper in 1956
- Born: John Cooper Jr. September 15, 1922; Los Angeles, California, U.S.
- Died: May 3, 2011 (aged 88); Santa Monica, California, U.S.
- Resting place: Arlington National Cemetery
- Occupation: Actor
- Years active: 1928–1990
- Spouses: June Horne (m. 1944; div. 1949) Hildy Parks (m. 1950; div. 1951) Barbara Rae Kraus (m. 1954; died 2009)
- Children: 4

John Cooper Jr. (September 15, 1922 – May 3, 2011), known professionally as Jackie Cooper, was an American actor and director. He began his career as a child actor and was a featured member of the Our Gang ensemble 1929–1931. At age nine, he became the only child and youngest person nominated for the Academy Award for Best Actor for the 1931 film Skippy. He then successfully transitioned to adolescent roles in the 1930s and adult roles from 1940 on.

He later starred in two popular television sitcoms, The People's Choice (1955–58) and Hennesey (1959–1962), as well as playing Daily Planet editor-in-chief Perry White in the 1978–1987 Superman films. He also had success as a television director, earning two Primetime Emmy Awards for directing. He had a parallel career as a U.S. Navy officer, both active duty and reserve.

For his contributions to the motion picture industry, Cooper was honored with a Hollywood Walk of Fame star located at 1507 Vine Street.

== Early life ==
John Cooper Jr. was born in Los Angeles, California. Cooper's father, Brooklyn-born John George Cooper, left the family when Jackie was two years old. His mother, Mabel Leonard Bigelow (née Polito), was a stage pianist. Cooper's maternal uncle, Jack Leonard, was a screenwriter, and his maternal aunt, Julie Leonard, was an actress married to director Norman Taurog. Cooper's stepfather was C. J. Bigelow, a studio production manager. His mother was Italian American (her family's surname was changed from "Polito" to "Leonard"). The two never reunited after he had left the family.

== Early acting career ==
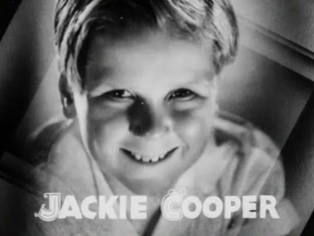
Cooper as he appeared in the film Broadway to Hollywood (1933)

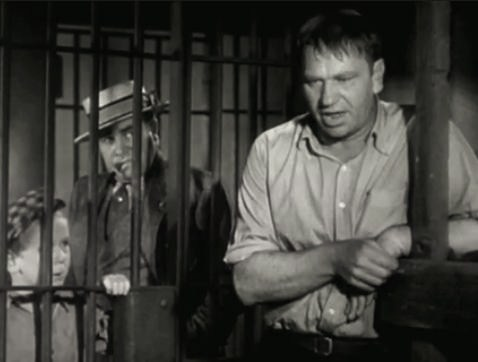
Cooper, Edward Brophy, and Wallace Beery in The Champ (1931)

Cooper first appeared in films as an extra with his grandmother, who took him to her auditions hoping it would help her get extra work. At age three, Jackie appeared in Lloyd Hamilton comedies under the name of "Leonard".

Cooper graduated to bit parts in feature films such as Fox Movietone Follies of 1929 and Sunny Side Up. His director in those films, David Butler, recommended Cooper to director Leo McCarey, who arranged an audition for the Our Gang comedy series produced by Hal Roach. In 1929, Cooper signed a three-year contract after joining the series in the short Boxing Gloves. He initially was cast as a supporting character, but by early 1930 his success in transitioning to sound films enabled him to become one of Our Gang's major characters, called Jackie in the series, replacing Harry Spear, who left after his contract expired. He was the main character in the 1930 entries The First Seven Years and When the Wind Blows. His most notable performances explore his crush on schoolteacher Miss Crabtree (portrayed by June Marlowe) in the trilogy Teacher's Pet, School's Out, and Love Business.

While under contract to Hal Roach Studios, in 1931 Cooper was loaned to Paramount to star in Skippy, directed by his uncle, Norman Taurog. At age nine, Cooper was nominated for an Academy Award for Best Actor, the youngest actor to be nominated for an Oscar in that category. Although Paramount paid Roach $25,000 for Cooper's services, Roach paid Cooper a standard salary of $50 per week.

Cooper was in great demand, resulting in Roach selling the actor's contract to Metro-Goldwyn-Mayer in 1931. Cooper acted with Wallace Beery in The Champ (1931—Beery's Oscar-winning role); a wittily comedic romp titled The Bowery (1933) with George Raft, Fay Wray and Pert Kelton; Robert Louis Stevenson's Treasure Island (1934) with Beery as Long John Silver alongside Lionel Barrymore, Lewis Stone and Nigel Bruce; and a father-son circus story about a one-armed animal trainer titled O'Shaughnessy's Boy (1935). In his autobiography, Cooper wrote that Beery was a disappointment and accused Beery of upstaging him and attempting to undermine his performances out of jealousy.

For the remainder of the 1930s, Cooper continued in a succession of teenage roles in adventure films and urban dramas. He played the lead role in the first two Henry Aldrich films, What a Life (1939) and Life with Henry (1941). In the 1941 musical Ziegfeld Girl, he co-starred with James Stewart, Judy Garland, Hedy Lamarr, and Lana Turner.

== Adult years ==
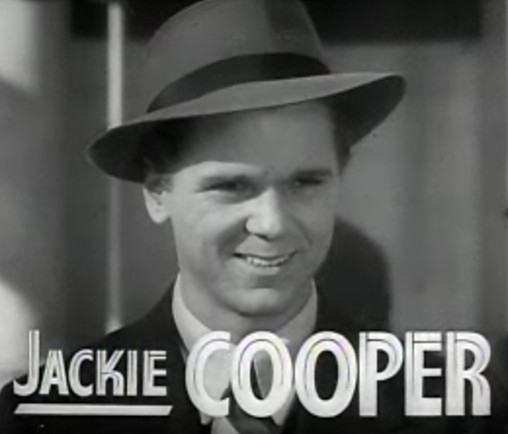
Trailer for Gallant Sons (1940)

Cooper served in the U.S. Navy during World War II, remaining in the reserves until 1982, retiring at the rank of captain and receiving the Legion of Merit. After the war ended, Cooper returned to Hollywood but became dissatisfied with the quality of the roles he was being offered, such as the gimmick of pairing him with another former child star, Jackie Coogan, in two poorly-received comedies, Kilroy Was Here (1947) and French Leave (1948). He began to gravitate towards stage and television work. In 1950, Cooper was cast in a production of Mr. Roberts in Boston, Massachusetts, in the role of Ensign Pulver. In 1954, he guest-starred on the NBC legal drama Justice. He appeared on ABC's The Pat Boone Chevy Showroom, guest-starred with Tennessee Ernie Ford on NBC's The Ford Show as America's Uranium King, and as Charles A. Steen in "I Found 60 Million Dollars" on the Armstrong Circle Theatre.

Cooper's best known acting roles in the 1950s and 60s were his starring roles in two successful television sitcoms, each of which ran for three seasons. In NBC's The People's Choice (1955-58), co-staring Patricia Breslin, he portrayed a city councilman, Socrates "Sock" Miller, who marries the mayor's daughter. He was the title character, a U.S. Navy physician, in CBS's Hennessy (1959-62) with Abby Dalton. He directed several episodes each of those two sitcoms, paving the way for his later success as a television director. In 1964, Cooper appeared in Rod Serling's The Twilight Zone episode "Caesar and Me", and in 1968 a made-for-television film, Shadow on the Land.

From 1964 to 1969, Cooper was vice president of program development at Columbia Pictures' Screen Gems TV division. He was responsible for packaging series such as Bewitched and selling them to the networks. While working in television, Cooper made some attempts to develop a new Our Gang series, but eventually abandoned the idea, concluding that Our Gang was a phenomenon of its time and could not be replicated.

Cooper left Columbia in 1969. He appeared in the fourth season of Hawaii Five-O in an episode called "The Burning Ice" Cooper appeared in Candidate for Crime starring Peter Falk as Columbo in 1973; Season 1 Episode 12 "Last Rites for a Dead Priest" of Kojak in 1974 starring Telly Savalas, and in the 1975 ABC series Mobile One, a Jack Webb/Mark VII Limited production. He guest-starred in a 1978 two-part episode of The Rockford Files, "The House on Willis Avenue", a series for which he had previously directed five episodes. Cooper's work as director on episodes of M*A*S*H and The White Shadow earned him Emmy awards.

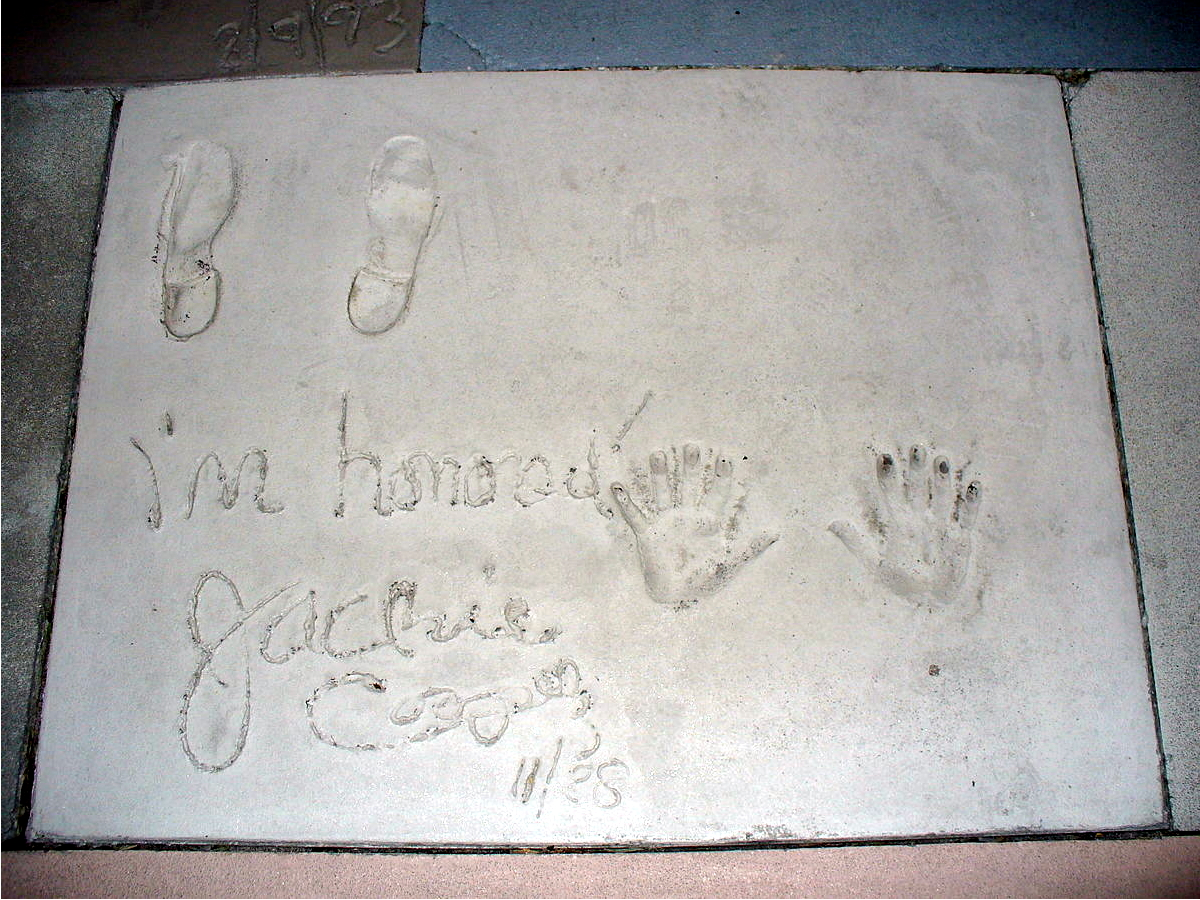
Cooper's handprints in front of The Great Movie Ride at Walt Disney World's Disney's Hollywood Studios theme park.

In the 1970s and 1980s, Cooper appeared as Daily Planet editor Perry White in the four Superman films that starred Christopher Reeve, a role he got when Keenan Wynn, who was originally cast as White, became unavailable after suffering a heart attack.

Cooper's final film role was as Ace Morgan in the 1987 film Surrender, starring Sally Field, Michael Caine, and Steve Guttenberg. Cooper announced his retirement in 1989, with his final television appearance as John C. Dodd in two episodes of Capital News in 1992.

== Personal life ==
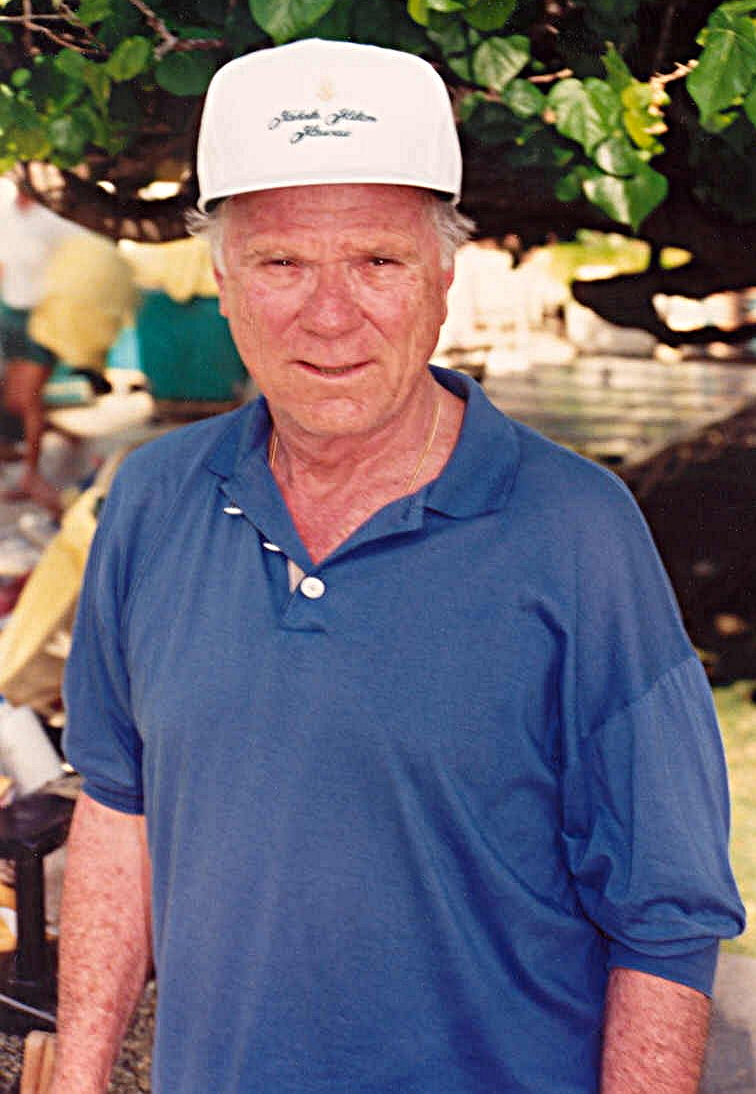
Cooper in 1989

Cooper served in the United States Navy during World War II and remained active in the Naval Reserve for the next several decades, reaching the rank of captain. He was married to June Horne from 1944 until 1949, with whom he had a son, John "Jack" Cooper III, who was born in 1946. June was the daughter of director James W. Horne and actress Cleo Ridgely. Cooper was married to Hildy Parks from 1950 until 1951 and to Barbara Rae Kraus from 1954 until her death in 2009. Cooper and Kraus had three children: Russell, born in 1956; Julie, born in 1957; and Cristina, born in 1959. Julie and Cristina died in 1997 and 2009, respectively.

Cooper supported Republican presidential candidates and appeared at rallies for Herbert Hoover in 1932 and Dwight D. Eisenhower in 1952.

Cooper participated in several automobile racing events, including the record-breaking class D cars at the Bonneville Salt Flats in Utah. He drove in several SCCA road racing competitions. Cooper was named the honorary starter for the 1976 Winston 500 at the Alabama International Motor Speedway, which is now known as Talladega Superspeedway, in Talladega, Alabama.

Cooper's autobiography, Please Don't Shoot My Dog, was published in 1982. The title refers to an incident during the filming of Skippy, when Norman Taurog, who was the director, needed Cooper to cry a number of times on camera. To accomplish that, Taurog used various tricks intended to upset Cooper. For example, one time Taurog ordered a security guard to go backstage and pretend to shoot Cooper's dog. The stunt resulted in genuine tears; Cooper afterwards discovered his dog was in fact fine. Later that same day, his mother came to the set and showed Cooper a better way for an actor to experience emotions in the scene—by studying the script and empathizing with the character he was portraying. The book also details the affair Cooper had as a teenager with Joan Crawford.

Cooper announced his retirement in 1989, although he continued directing episodes of the syndicated series Superboy. He began spending more time training and racing horses at Hollywood Park and outside San Diego during the Del Mar racing season. Cooper lived in Beverly Hills from 1955 until his death.

For his contributions to the motion picture industry, Cooper was honored with a Hollywood Walk of Fame star located at 1507 Vine Street.

== Death ==
Cooper died on May 3, 2011, aged 88, in Santa Monica, California, after a short illness. He was survived by his two sons. He outlived both his daughters and wife, Barbara Rae Kraus. He was interred at Arlington National Cemetery in Arlington County, Virginia, in honor of his naval service.

== Filmography ==
Film
Year	Title	Role	Notes
1929	Fox Movietone Follies of 1929	Little Boy	Uncredited
1929	Sunny Side Up	Jerry McGinnis	Uncredited
1931	Skippy	Skippy	Nominated – Academy Award for Best Actor
1931	Young Donovan's Kid	Midge Murray	
1931	The Champ	Dink Purcell	
1931	Sooky	Skippy	
1932	When a Feller Needs a Friend	Edward Haverford "Eddie" Randall	
1932	Divorce in the Family	Terry Parker	
1933	Broadway to Hollywood	Ted Hackett Jr.	
1933	The Bowery	Swipes McGurk	
1933	Lone Cowboy	Scooter O'Neal	
1934	Treasure Island	Jim Hawkins	
1934	Peck's Bad Boy	Bill Peck	
1935	Dinky	Dinky Daniels	
1935	O'Shaughnessy's Boy	Joseph "Stubby" O'Shaughnessy	
1936	Tough Guy	Frederick Martindale "Freddie" Vincent III	
1936	The Devil Is a Sissy	"Buck" Murphy	
1937	Boy of the Streets	Chuck Brennan	
1938	White Banners	Peter Trimble	
1938	That Certain Age	Kenneth "Ken" Warren	
1938	Gangster's Boy	Larry Kelly	
1938	Newsboys' Home	Rifle Edwards	
1939	Scouts to the Rescue	Bruce Scott	
1939	The Spirit of Culver	Tom Allen	
1939	Streets of New York	James Michael "Jimmy" Keenan	
1939	Two Bright Boys	Rory O'Donnell	
1939	What a Life	Henry Aldrich	
1939	The Big Guy	Jimmy Hutchins	
1940	Seventeen	William Sylvanus Baxter	
1940	The Return of Frank James	Clem	
1940	Life with Henry	Henry Aldrich	
1940	Gallant Sons	Byron "By" Newbold	
1941	Ziegfeld Girl	Jerry Regan	
1941	Her First Beau	Chuck Harris	
1941	Glamour Boy	Tiny Barlow	
1942	Syncopation	Johnny Schumacher	
1942	Men of Texas	Robert Houston Scott	
1942	The Navy Comes Through	Joe "Babe" Duttson	
1943	Where Are Your Children?	Danny Cheston	
1947	Stork Bites Man	Ernest (Ernie) C. Brown	
1947	Kilroy Was Here	John J. Kilroy	
1948	French Leave	Skitch Kilroy	
1955	The People's Choice	Socrates "Sock" Miller	Television series, 1955 to 1958
1959	Hennesey	Lt. Charles "Chick" Hennesey, MD	Television series, 1959 to 1962
1961	Everything's Ducky		
1964	Calhoun: County Agent	Everett Calhoun	Television film
1964	The Twilight Zone	Jonathan West	Episode: Caesar and me
1968	Shadow on the Land	Lt. Col. Andy Davis	Television film
1971	The Love Machine	Danton Miller	
1971	Maybe I'll Come Home in the Spring	Ed Miller	Television film
1971	Hawaii Five-O	Dr. Alex Southmore	Episode: "The Burning Ice"
1972	The Astronaut	Kurt Anderson	Television film
1972	Stand Up and Be Counted	Doctor	Uncredited, also director
1973	Columbo	Nelson Hayward	Television series; episode: "Candidate for Crime"
1973	The F.B.I.	Harlan Slade	Television series; S9E3
1973	Of Men and Women	Ted	Television film
1974	Chosen Survivors	Raymond Couzins	
1974	The Day the Earth Moved	Steve Barker	Television film
1974	Kojak	Frank Mulvaney	Television series; S1E12
1975	Journey into Fear	Eric Hurst	
1975	The Rockford Files	Captain Hyland	Episode: "Claire"
1978	Having Babies III		Director
1978	Perfect Gentlemen		Director
1978	Superman	Perry White	
1978	The Rockford Files	Garth McGregor	Episode: "The House on Willis Avenue"
1978	Rainbow		Director
1979	Sex and the Single Parent		Director
1980	White Mama		Director
1980	Superman II	Perry White	
1980	Rodeo Girl		Director
1981	Leave 'Em Laughing		Director
1982	Moonlight		Director
1982	Rosie: The Rosemary Clooney Story		Director
1983	Superman III	Perry White	
1984	The Night They Saved Christmas		Director
1985	Izzy & Moe		Director
1986	Murder, She Wrote	Carl Schulman/Neil Fletcher	
1987	Magnum, P.I.		Director
1987	The Ladies		Director
1987	Superman IV: The Quest for Peace	Perry White	
1987	Surrender	Ace Morgan	(Final film role)

== See also ==
- List of oldest and youngest Academy Award winners and nominees – Youngest nominees for Best Lead Actor
- List of actors with Academy Award nominations
