= Go Man Go (film) =

1954 film by James Wong Howe

Go, Man, Go!
- 1954 Theatrical Poster
- Directed by: James Wong Howe
- Written by: Alfred Palca
- Produced by: Alfred Palca
- Starring: Dane Clark; Sidney Poitier; Ruby Dee; The Harlem Globetrotters; Patricia Breslin
- Cinematography: William O. Steiner
- Edited by: Faith Elliott
- Music by: Alex North
- Production company: Sirod Productions
- Distributed by: United Artists
- Release date: January 27, 1954
- Running time: 82 minutes
- Country: United States
- Language: English
- Budget: $300,000
- Box office: $800,000 (US/Canada rental estimate)

Go, Man, Go! is a 1954 American sports film directed by James Wong Howe, starring Dane Clark, Sidney Poitier, Ruby Dee, Patricia Breslin, The Harlem Globetrotters and Slim Gaillard. Clark plays Abe Saperstein, the organizer of the Globetrotters. Poitier's character is Inman Jackson, the team's showboating center. Breslin plays Sylvia Saperstein, the love interest. Gaillard plays himself.

== Plot ==
The film tracks the Globetrotters from humble beginnings through a triumph over a major-league basketball team, as they struggle to overcome racial discrimination. Actual Harlem Globetrotter players portray the team in basketball action throughout the picture. The friendship between Saperstein and Jackson, and their wives, is an important storyline.

== Cast ==
- Dane Clark as Abe Saperstein
- Patricia Breslin as Sylvia Franklin Saperstein
- Sidney Poitier as Inman Jackson
- Anatol Winogradoff as Papa Saperstein
- Celia Brodkin as Mama Saperstein
- Carol Sinclair as Fay Saperstein
- Ellsworth Wright as Sam
- Slim Gaillard as Himself
- Frieda Altman as Ticket Seller
- Mort Marshall as Master of Ceremonies
- Jean Shore as Secretary
- Reece 'Goose' Tatum as Himself, Harlem Globetrotter
- 'Sweetwater' Clifton as Himself, Harlem Globetrotter
- Marques Haynes as Himself, Harlem Globetrotter
- Bill Stern as Himself
- Marty Glickman as Himself
- Ruby Dee as Irma Jackson

== Production ==
The film was cinematographer Howe's directorial debut. It was filmed at the Fox Movietone Studios and at Madison Square Garden in New York in 20 days.

== Hollywood blacklist ==
Screenwriter and producer Alfred Palca was accused by the Federal Bureau of Investigation in 1953 of being a Communist. He refused to cooperate with their investigations. No distributor was willing to release the film with his name credited, so he gave the producing credit to his brother-in-law, Anton Leader, and the screenwriting credit to his cousin, Arnold Becker, a pediatrician. He never worked in the film industry again. According to Palca, the F.B.I. saw his casting of Poitier as further evidence of his Communism.

In 1997, a ceremony at the Academy Theatre honored blacklisted Hollywood writers and directors and restored Palca's writing credit for the film.

== Reception ==
Bosley Crowther, reviewing the film for The New York Times, observed, "This is the second little picture in which the Globetrotters have been starred. The encore is not excessive. They still give an entertaining show."

== See also ==
- List of basketball films
