= Joan Marshall =

American actress (1931–1992)

- As Lt. Areel Shaw in Star Trek episode "Court Martial" (1967)
- Born: Joan Schrepferman; June 6, 1931; Chicago, Illinois, U.S.
- Died: June 28, 1992 (aged 61); Montego Bay, Jamaica
- Other names: Jean Arless; Joan Marshall Ashby; Joan Ashby; Joan Marshall Bartfield; Joan Bartfield
- Occupation: Actress
- Years active: 1945–1975
- Spouses: Leslie Sanders (m. 1948; div. 1951) Charles Murano (m. 1952; div. 1953) Hal Ashby (m. 1969; div. 1970) Jeffrey A. Stein (m. 1978, divorced) Melvin Lawrence Bartfield (m. 1990)
- Children: 2

Joan Marshall (born Joan Schrepferman; June 6, 1931 – June 28, 1992) was an American film and television actress. She is best known for her appearances in The Twilight Zone's "Dead Man's Shoes" and Star Trek's "Court Martial", as well as in the 1961 film Homicidal.

== Early life ==
She was born Joan Schrepferman on June 6, 1931 in Chicago, where she was raised. When she was 17, she had polio that paralyzed her face, neck, spine, and vocal cords, leaving her temporarily unable to speak. She began her career performing as a chorus girl in Chicago clubs and then as a showgirl in Las Vegas.

== Career ==
After appearing as a dancer in The Chicago Kid (1945) and in a part in the television series Have Gun – Will Travel playing Sheriff Quinn's daughter Molly in S1 E26 "Birds of a Feather" (1958), she moved to California around 1959. In 1959, she reprised the Lauren Bacall role of Sailor Duval in the short-lived television series version of the syndicated radio series Bold Venture. During the 1960s, Marshall frequently guest-starred on various television series, including Tales of Wells Fargo, Lawman, Maverick, Surfside 6, Hawaiian Eye, Gunsmoke, and The Jack Benny Program.

She appeared in the films Homicidal (using the stage name Jean Arless) and Tammy and the Doctor opposite Sandra Dee and Peter Fonda.

Marshall also appeared in the 15-minute unaired pilot of The Munsters as Phoebe Munster (who strongly resembled Morticia Addams). Before the series was picked up, The Munsters was retooled and Marshall was replaced by actress Yvonne De Carlo. Marshall continued guest-starring in episodic television throughout the 1960s before her last role in the 1975 film Shampoo with Warren Beatty. She also worked as Barbra Streisand's personal assistant on her self-produced 1976 film A Star Is Born.

== Personal life and death ==
Marshall was married five times. She had two children with her first two husbands. Marshall's third marriage was to director Hal Ashby in August 1969; she divorced him a year later in 1970, and married for a fourth time to Jeffrey A. Stein in 1978, whom she also divorced. In 1990 she married for a fifth time, this time to executive Mel Bartfield. She bought property in Jamaica. She died there of lung cancer at age 61 on June 28, 1992.

== Filmography ==
Film
Year	Title	Role	Notes
1945	The Chicago Kid	Dancer	uncredited
1958	Live Fast, Die Young	Judy Tobin	
1961	Homicidal	Emily/Warren	credited as Jean Arless
1963	Tammy and the Doctor	Vera Parker, Nurse	
1964	Looking for Love	Miss Devine	
1967	The Happiest Millionaire	Maid	uncredited
1968	The Horse in the Gray Flannel Suit	Mimsey	
1969	The Great Sex War		a.k.a. Make Love Not War
1975	Shampoo	Mrs. Schumann	

Television
Year	Title	Role	Notes
1957	Alcoa Theatre	Rita Benson	Episode: "Souvenir"
1958	Have Gun - Will Travel	Molly	Episode: "Birds of a Feather"
1958	Mickey Spillane's Mike Hammer	Lisa Greer	Episode: "Play Belles' Toll"
1958	The Millionaire	Helen Rawlings	Episode: "The Jack Garrison Story"
1958	Tombstone Territory	Laura Coleman	Episode: "Fight for a Fugitive"
1958	Highway Patrol	Alice Carter	Episode: "Hostage"
1958	Bat Masterson	Laura Hopkins	Episode: "Stampede at Tent City"
1958	The Rough Riders	Lydia Kimbrough	Episode: "The Governor"
1958, 1961	Maverick	Various roles	2 episodes
1959	Bold Venture	Sailor Duval	Main cast
1960	M Squad	Karen Tinsley	Episode: "Needle in a Haystack"
1960	Men into Space	Lorrie Sigmund	Episode: "Flash in the Sky"
1960	Lawman	Lady Belle Smythe	Episode: "The Lady Belle"
1960	Bourbon Street Beat	Amanda Hale	Episode: "Last Exit"
1960	Hennesey	Consuelo Maddox	Episode: "The Marriage of Dr. Blair"
1960–1961	Dante	Various roles	2 episodes
1960–1961	Bronco	Various roles	3 episodes
1960–1962	Surfside 6	Various roles	3 episodes
1960, 1962	77 Sunset Strip	Various roles	2 episodes
1960–1963	Hawaiian Eye	Various roles	3 episodes
1961	Michael Shayne	Randy Hobbes	Episode: "Murder 'Round My Wrist"
1961	Tales of Wells Fargo	Lisa Lindsay	Episode: "The Barefoot Bandit"
1961	The Detectives	Various roles	2 episodes
1961	The Roaring 20's	Carla	2 episodes
1962	The Twilight Zone	Wilma	Episode: "Dead Man's Shoes"
1962	Follow the Sun	Winifred	Episode: "A Ghost in Her Gazebo"
1962	Gunsmoke	Emma	Episode: "Wagon Girls"
1962	Alcoa Premiere	Rhoda Traynor	Episode: "Guest In the House"
1963–1964	The Jack Benny Program	Various roles	2 episodes
1964	Petticoat Junction	Lucy Wayne	Episode: "Visit from a Big Star"
1964	The Munsters	Phoebe Munster	Unaired pilot
1965	The F.B.I.	Elizabeth Gowan	Episode: "The Insolents"
1966	Laredo	Miss Ivy Vine	Episode: "Limit of the Law Larkin"
1966	Dr. Kildare	Charlene Ross	2 episodes
1967	The Road West	Judith Devery	Episode: "The Predators"
1967	Star Trek	Lt. Areel Shaw	Episode: "Court Martial"
1967	I Spy	Ellie	Episode: "Casanova from Canarsie"
1967	Bonanza	Millie Perkins	Episode: "A Man Without Land"
