= David Modell =

American business executive and sports team owner (1960–2017)

- Born: David Orrick McDearmon, Jr. August 16, 1960; Willoughby, Ohio, U.S.
- Died: January 13, 2017 (aged 56); Baltimore, Maryland, U.S.
- Occupations: Businessman, sports team executive, attorney, consultant
- Years active: 1996–2004 (as NFL team executive); 1984–2017 (as attorney)
- Spouse: Michel (wife)
- Parent(s): Art Modell, (adoptive father); Patricia Breslin, actress David Orrick McDearmon, Sr. actor

David Modell (born David Orrick McDearmon, Jr.; August 16, 1960 – January 13, 2017) was an American business executive and sports team owner who served as the president and COO of the National Football League's Baltimore Ravens.

== Early years ==
Modell was the son of the late 1960s film and television actress Patricia Breslin and the late television and movie actor David Orrick McDearmon (1914–1979).

During his 25-year association with the original Cleveland Browns and the Baltimore Ravens, he worked in the ticket office and in the public relations and marketing divisions. He started working for the Browns at 14, in 1975, helping the members of the grounds crew.

In 1969, David's mother wed Cleveland Browns owner and advertising executive Art Modell. Shortly after, Modell legally adopted him and his brother, John.

== Baltimore Ravens ==
From the franchise's arrival in Baltimore as the re-christened "Ravens" in 1996, to the sale of the team to Steve Bisciotti in 2003, Modell served as President. He negotiated contracts and coordinated game day operations. He also helped to coordinate the fan vote to rename the team in 1996, and was involved in the selection of the team's new logo.

Shortly after the Ravens' victory in Super Bowl XXXV, Modell was handed control of the team's primary day-by-day operations by his father, team owner Art, who bought the franchise (then the Cleveland Browns) in 1961. Since the change of principal ownership, Modell, like his late father Art, maintained a position with the team as a consultant, and kept a low public profile.

== Personal life ==
Modell lived in Baltimore with his second wife, Michel, and helped run Modell Ventures. Modell also had an older brother, John.

Modell served as chairman for 3ality Digital, Inc., which provides 3D entertainment solutions from image captures through broadcast, in any viewing platform, for various consumers. Mr. Modell is survived by his wife Michel and his six children.

Modell died on January 13, 2017 at age 56, from lung cancer.
