= Patricia Breslin =

American actress and philanthropist (1926–2011)

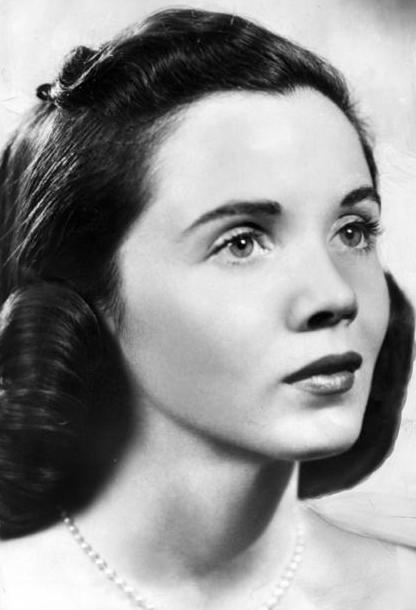
- Breslin in 1951
- Born: Patricia Rose Breslin; March 17, 1926; New York City, U.S.
- Died: October 12, 2011 (aged 85); Baltimore, Maryland, U.S.
- Education: College of New Rochelle
- Occupation: Actress
- Years active: 1949–1969
- Spouses: David Orrick McDearmon (m. 1953; div. 1969) Art Modell (m. 1969)
- Children: 2, including David Modell

Patricia Rose Breslin (March 17, 1926 - Oct 12, 2011) was an American actress and philanthropist. She had a prominent career in television, which included recurring roles as Amanda Miller on The People's Choice (1955–58), and as Laura Harrington Brooks on Peyton Place (1964–65). She also appeared in Go, Man, Go! (1954), and the William Castle horror films Homicidal (1961) and I Saw What You Did (1965).

In 1969, Breslin married NFL mogul Art Modell, and became a well-known philanthropist while living in both Cleveland, Ohio, and Baltimore, Maryland, donating millions of dollars to various educational, health, and art organizations, including the SEED Foundation of Maryland and the Baltimore Museum of Art. She also helped open the Hospice of the Western Reserve at the Cleveland Clinic.

== Early life ==
Patricia Rose Breslin was born in New York City on St. Patrick's Day 1926, of Irish descent, one of three children born to Edward (a judge) and Marjorie Breslin. Her father was a Catholic of Irish descent and her mother was of Scottish descent. Breslin was raised in the Parkchester neighborhood of the Southeast Bronx. She graduated from the Academy of Mount St. Ursula High School in the Bronx before attending the College of New Rochelle in New Rochelle, New York.

== Career ==
On television, Breslin co-starred in "The Long Walk", the May 30, 1950, episode of Cameo Theatre. In 1954, she guest-starred with Peter Mark Richman in an episode of NBC's legal drama, Justice, as a woman threatened by hoodlums. The same year, she appeared in a supporting role as Sylvia Franklin Saperstein in the sports film Go Man Go (1954), opposite Ruby Dee, Sidney Poitier, and the Harlem Globetrotters.

The following year, Breslin was cast in an episode of the CBS anthology series Appointment with Adventure, a series with neither a host nor a regular star. From 1955 to 1958, Breslin co-starred with Jackie Cooper as his girlfriend and then wife in the NBC sitcom, The People's Choice.

Between 1960 and 1963, Breslin made three guest appearances on CBS's Perry Mason, and was cast as the defendant in all three episodes. In 1960, she played Karen Lewis in "The Case of the Lavender Lipstick". In 1962, she played Karen Ross in "The Case of the Poison Pen-Pal", and in 1963, as Laura Hewes in "The Case of the Prankish Professor".

In 1960, she played the newlywed wife of William Shatner's character in CBS's The Twilight Zone episode "Nick of Time", and was also in the 1963 Twilight Zone episode "No Time Like the Past", in which she portrayed Abigail Sloan.

In 1960, she guest-starred on the short-lived David McLean Western series, Tate, which aired on NBC. She appeared on Nick Adams' ABC Western, The Rebel and with Jack Lord in his ABC adventure series, Stoney Burke. Thereafter, Breslin played the role of Anne Mitchell, along with co-stars Ralph Bellamy and Paul Fix, in the 1961 episode "The Haven" of CBS's anthology series, The DuPont Show with June Allyson.

She returned to film in 1961, starring in William Castle's horror film Homicidal, and later worked with him again on the thriller I Saw What You Did (1964). In 1964, she was cast in the role of Laura Brooks on the ABC primetime soap opera Peyton Place. She also played the role of Meg Baldwin in the ABC soap opera General Hospital from 1965 to 1969.

== Personal life ==
From 1953 to 1969, Breslin was married to character actor and director David Orrick McDearmon, and they had two children. Later, Breslin married then Cleveland Browns (later the Baltimore Ravens) NFL team owner, advertising and business executive Art Modell in 1969. Shortly after their marriage, Modell legally adopted Patricia's sons from her first marriage and they took his surname. The family lived in Waite Hill, Ohio, later moving to Owings Mills, Maryland, with a total of six grandchildren between them.

=== Philanthropy ===
Breslin became a well-known philanthropist in both Cleveland, Ohio, and Baltimore, Maryland, after relocating to the city in 1995. Modell and she donated $5 million to the SEED School of Maryland, a public boarding school for disadvantaged junior-high and high-school students from around the state. They also donated $3.5 million to help restore the Lyric Opera House, and Breslin served on the boards of the Baltimore Symphony Orchestra and the Walters Art Museum, and also donated to the Baltimore Museum of Art.

In Cleveland, she helped start the Hospice of the Western Reserve at the Cleveland Clinic, and supported the Cleveland Clinic Foundation. She was also active in the Make-A-Wish Foundation, the Cleveland Musical Arts Association, the Cleveland Ballet, the Playhouse Square Foundation, and the Cerebral Palsy Association.

=== Death ===
Breslin died on October 12, 2011, at age 85, after a lengthy hospitalization with pancreatitis. Her funeral was held at the Basilica of the National Shrine of the Assumption of the Blessed Virgin Mary in Baltimore. Her husband Art had been a major contributor to the restoration of the basilica.

== Filmography ==
=== Film ===
| Year | Title | Role | Notes |
|---|---|---|---|
| 1952 | Faith Is a Nine-Letter Word | | TV movie; episode of Hallmark Hall of Fame |
| 1953 | Man Against Pain | | TV movie; episode of Hallmark Hall of Fame |
| 1954 | Go, Man, Go! | Sylvia Franklin Saperstein | |
| 1958 | Andy Hardy Comes Home | Jane Hardy | Final entry in the MGM Andy Hardy film series |
| 1961 | Homicidal | Miriam Webster | |
| 1965 | I Saw What You Did | Ellie Mannering | |

=== Television ===
| Year | Title | Role | Notes |
|---|---|---|---|
| 1949 | The Goldbergs | Dora Barnett | Episode: "Birds Leave the Nest" |
| 1952 | Broadway Television Theatre | Rebecca | Season 1 Episode 20: "Rebecca" |
| 1953 | Armstrong Circle Theatre | N/A | Season 3 Episode 15: "Black Wedding" |
| 1954 | The Goldbergs | Dora Barnett | Episode dated May 11 |
| 1954 | Broadway Television Theatre | N/A | Season 3 Episode 14: "Room Service" |
| 1954 | Armstrong Circle Theatre | Jeannie McTavish | Season 4 Episode 31: "My Client, McDuff" |
| 1954 | The Telltale Clue | Sally Bell | Season 1 Episode 2: "The Case of the Talking Garden" |
| 1955 | The Best of Broadway | Elaine Harper | Season 1 Episode 5: "Arsenic and Old Lace" |
| 1955 | Appointment with Adventure | Sally | Season 1 Episode 2: "Five in Judgement" |
| 1955–1958 | The People's Choice | Amanda 'Mandy' Peoples Miller | 104 episodes |
| 1958 | Schlitz Playhouse of Stars | Julia Heyton | Season 8 Episode 4: "False Impression" |
| 1958 | Alcoa Theatre | June Dunlap | Season 2 Episode 7: "The Dark File" |
| 1958 | Alfred Hitchcock Presents | Mrs. Adams | Season 4 Episode 4: "The Crooked Road" |
| 1959 | Maverick | Alice Appleton / Abigail Allen | Season 2 Episode 20: "Yellow River" |
| 1959 | The Millionaire | Susan Ballard | Season 5 Episode 33: "Millionaire Susan Ballard" |
| 1960 | Alfred Hitchcock Presents | Louise Bentley | Season 6 Episode 8: "O Youth and Beauty!" |
| 1960 | Hotel de Paree | Ellie Graham | Season 1 Episode 31: "Sundance and the Fallen Sparrow" |
| 1960 | Tate | Jessica Jackson | Season 1 Episode 13: "The Return of Jessica Jackson" |
| 1960 | Outlaws | Julie Kittrick | Season 1 Episode 2: "Ballad for a Badman" |
| 1960 | The Detectives | Jean Graham | Season 2 Episode 9: "Adopted" |
| 1960 | The Twilight Zone | Pat Carter | Season 2 Episode 7: "Nick of Time" |
| 1960 | Perry Mason | Karen Lewis | Season 4 Episode 5: "The Case of the Lavender Lipstick" |
| 1961 | The Rifleman | Cora Seevers | Season 3 Episode 16: "Flowers by the Door" |
| 1961 | The DuPont Show with June Allyson | Anne Mitchell | Season 2 Episode 23: "The Haven" |
| 1961 | The Rebel | Elizabeth Purdy | Season 2 Episode 29: "Miz Purdy" |
| 1961 | The New Breed | Ruth Wollock | Season 1 Episode 9: "Sweet Bloom of Death" |
| 1961 | Tales of Wells Fargo | Theresa Coburn | Season 6 Episode 12: "A Killing in Calico" |
| 1962 | Alfred Hitchcock Presents | Margo | Season 7 Episode 24: "Apex" |
| 1962 | The Alfred Hitchcock Hour | Linda Mallory | Season 1 Episode 3: "Night of the Owl" |
| 1962 | The Donna Reed Show | Millie | Season 4 Episode 25: "The Wide Open Spaces" |
| 1962 | Adventures in Paradise | Lorraine Maybery | Season 3 Episode 24: "The Dream Merchant" |
| 1962 | Thriller | Dinah Duffay | Season 2 Episode 26: "Kill My Love" |
| 1962 | Bonanza | Susan Blanchard | Season 3 Episode 34: "The Miracle Maker" |
| 1962 | Stoney Burke | Lee Anne Hewitt | Season 1 Episode 4: "Point of Honor" |
| 1962 | Saints and Sinners | Nancy Rogers | Season 1 Episode 7: "A Servant in the House of My Party" |
| 1962 | Perry Mason | Karen Ross | Season 5 Episode 20: "The Case of the Poison Pen-Pal" |
| 1963 | Perry Mason | Laura Hewes | Season 6 Episode 15: "The Case of the Prankish Professor" |
| 1963 | The Twilight Zone | Abigail Sloan | Season 4 Episode 10: "No Time Like the Past" |
| 1963 | The Dick Powell Theatre | Susan Baird | Season 2 Episode 27: "Epilogue" |
| 1963 | Arrest and Trial | Elizabeth Forellen | Season 1 Episode 9: "Inquest Into a Bleeding Heart" |
| 1963 | Dr. Kildare | Marion French | Season 3 Episode 14: "A Vote of Confidence" |
| 1964 | The Alfred Hitchcock Hour | Doris Parkerson | Season 2 Episode 20: "Anyone for Murder?" |
| 1964 | Insight | Maria | Season 1 Episode 141: "The Capitalist" |
| 1964 | The Greatest Show on Earth | Lisa | Season 1 Episode 16: "Corsicans Don't Cry" |
| 1964 | The Virginian | Mary Ann Martin | Season 2 Episode 27: "The Long Quest" |
| 1964 | Death Valley Days | Nancy | Season 12 Episode 26: "The Streets of El Paso" |
| 1964–1965 | Peyton Place | Laura Harrington Brooks | 30 episodes |
| 1965–1969 | General Hospital | Meg Bentley, R.N. | Contract role (26 episodes) (final appearance) |
