= Drums of Fate =

1923 film by Charles Maigne

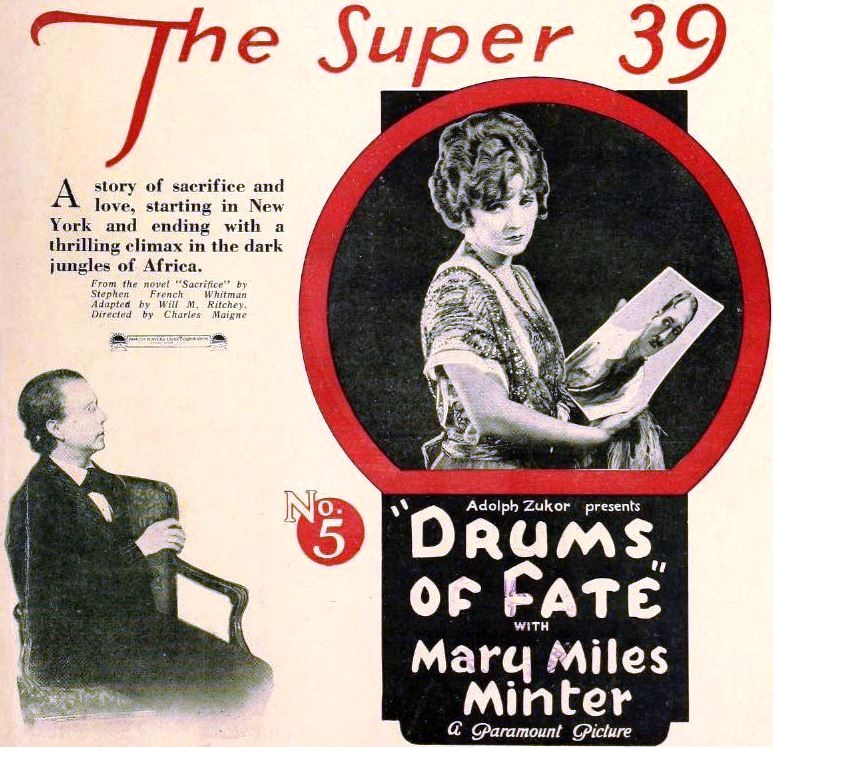
- Advertisement
- Directed by: Charles Maigne
- Screenplay by: Will M. Ritchey
- Based on: Sacrifice by Stephen French Whitman
- Produced by: Adolph Zukor
- Starring: Mary Miles Minter; Maurice 'Lefty' Flynn; George Fawcett
- Cinematography: James Wong Howe
- Production company: Famous Players–Lasky Corporation
- Distributed by: Paramount Pictures
- Release date: January 14, 1923
- Running time: 6 reels
- Country: United States
- Language: Silent (English intertitles)

Drums of Fate is a 1923 American silent drama film directed by Charles Maigne and starring Mary Miles Minter. It was adapted by Will M. Ritchey from the novel "Sacrifice" by Stephen French Whitman. It was also referred to as "Drums of Destiny" in some promotional material. As with many of Minter's features, it is thought to be a lost film.

== Plot ==
As described in various film magazine reviews, Carol Dolliver, a young society girl, rejects her guardian's choice of a suitor in favour of the dashing explorer Laurence "Larry" Teck. After their wedding, Larry returns to Africa without Carol, where he is captured by a band of native warriors.

News reaches Carol that her husband has been slain, and so, to please her guardian, she weds the crippled musician David Verne, although she does not love him. Meanwhile, Larry has befriended the native king and eventually manages to escape and return to Carol.

Having believed him to be dead, Carol's initial reaction to Larry's return is one of shock rather than welcome. This, along with the news of her marriage to Verne, convinces Larry that it would be best for him to return to Africa and to the native king, leaving a note for Carol telling her to divorce him.

The shock of Larry's reappearance proves fatal to the ailing Verne, and so Carol decides to pursue her husband to Africa. Although she is almost captured by natives, she eventually discovers Larry in an African village, and the two are happily reunited.

== Cast ==
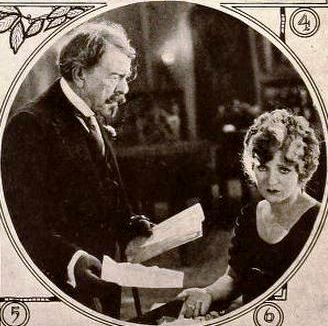
George Fawcett and Mary Miles Minter in "Drums of Fate"

- Mary Miles Minter as Carol Dolliver
- Maurice 'Lefty' Flynn as Laurence Teck
- George Fawcett as Felix Brantome
- Robert Cain as Cornelius Rysbroek
- Casson Ferguson as David Verne
- Bertram Grassby as Hamoud Bin-Said
- Noble Johnson as Native King
