= Appointment with Adventure =

American TV dramatic anthology series (1955–1956)

- Genre: Dramatic anthology series
- Directed by: Robert Stevens

Production
- Executive producer: David Susskind
- Producer: Robert Stevens
- Production company: Talent Associates

Original release
- Network: CBS
- Release: April 3, 1955 – April 1, 1956

Appointment with Adventure is an American dramatic anthology television program that was broadcast from April 3, 1955, until April 1, 1956, on CBS.

== Format and actors ==
Appointment with Adventure presented stories whose settings varied among locations in the United States and in places in the world beyond U.S. borders. Some stories were contemporary, while others were period pieces set in World War II, the U.S. Civil War, and other eras.

The program had no regular cast. Guest stars who appeared in episodes included Patricia Breslin, Jack Klugman, Barbara Britton, Jack Lord, Edie Adams, James Daly, Neville Brand, Viveca Lindfors, Gene Barry, Kim Hunter, Polly Bergen, Dane Clark, Elizabeth Montgomery, Betsy Palmer, Gena Rowlands, Phyllis Kirk, Tony Randall, Theodore Bikel, Jason Robards, Christopher Plummer, Patti Page, John Cassavetes, and Paul Newman.

== Production ==
Appointment with Adventure was produced by Talent Associates. David Susskind was the executive producer, with Robert Stevens as producer and director. Writers included Rod Serling, Anne Howard Bailey, Jean-Charles Tacchella, and Newton Meltzer. Revlon and P. Lorillard Company were the sponsors. It was broadcast live from 10 to 10:30 p.m. Eastern Time.

Extension of the program's original contract was announced on November 25, 1955, two weeks before the contract would have ended. Subsequently it was scheduled to end with the March 18, 1956, broadcast, to be replaced by The $64,000 Challenge. The new show was not ready, however, so two more episodes were shown.

== Critical reception ==
A review in The New York Times after Appointment with Adventure's first two episodes described the first as "a sorry ordeal" and the second as "interesting entertainment". In contrast, a review in the trade publication Billboard said, "The first installment . . . had an attractive cast, a highly realistic setting, and a tense, tho [sic] sometimes ambiguous, script." Gene Plotnik added, "Jourdan and Dauphin turned in their usual suave and charming performances", and he described Powers's performance as "remarkably exciting".

The trade publication Variety called the first episode a "clinker" and noted the difficulty of doing an outdoor-set adventure show live. It called rear-screen backgrounds used in the episode "artificial and unnatural looking". The story received mixed comments, with the adventure elements praised, while treatment of a romantic triangle was called "a trite and familiar formula." Dauphin, Powers, and Jourdan "were all unconvincing in the leads", the review said. The review concluded added that executives would have to decide "whether they want to do a real adventure series or a soap opera with an outdoor setting."

== Selected episodes ==
- April 3, 1955 -- "Minus Three Thousand" with Claude Dauphin, Louis Jourdan, and Mala Powers.
- April 10, 1955 -- "Five in Judgment" with Jack Lord, Paul Newman; and Patricia Breslin.
- November 27, 1955 -- "Time Bomb" -- Chester Morris, Jean Bal, Anthony Eisley.
