= No Time Like the Past =

- The Twilight Zone episode
- Episode no.: Season 4 Episode 10
- Directed by: Justus Addiss
- Written by: Rod Serling
- Production code: 4853
- Original air date: March 7, 1963

Guest appearances
- Dana Andrews; Patricia Breslin; Robert F. Simon; Malcolm Atterbury; Marjorie Bennett; James Yagi; Tudor Owen; John Zaremba; Robert Cornthwaite; Lindsay Workman

Episode chronology
← Previous "Printer's Devil"	Next → "The Parallel"
- The Twilight Zone (1959 TV series) (season 4)

"No Time Like the Past" is episode 112 of the American television anthology series The Twilight Zone. In this episode a man tries to escape the troubles of the 20th century by taking up residence in an idyllic small town in the 19th century.

== Opening narration ==
Exit one Paul Driscoll, a creature of the twentieth century. He puts to a test a complicated theorem of space-time continuum, but he goes a step further, or tries to. Shortly, he will seek out three moments of the past in a desperate attempt to alter the present, one of the odd and fanciful functions in a shadowland known as the Twilight Zone.

== Plot ==
Disgusted with 20th century problems such as world wars, atomic weapons and radioactive poisoning, Paul Driscoll solicits the help of his colleague Harvey and uses a time machine, intent to remake the present by altering past events.

Paul first travels to Hiroshima on August 6, 1945, and attempts to warn a Hiroshima police captain about the atomic bomb, but the captain dismisses him as insane. Paul then travels to a Berlin hotel room to assassinate Adolf Hitler in August 1939 (immediately before the outbreak of World War II the following month), but is interrupted when a housekeeper knocks on his door and later calls two SS guards to his room. On his third stop, Paul tries to change the course of the Lusitania on May 6, 1915, to avoid being torpedoed by a German U-boat, but the ship's captain questions his credibility.

Paul accepts the hypothesis that the past cannot be changed. He then uses the time machine to go to the town of Homeville, Indiana in 1881, resolving not to make any changes, but just to live out his life free of the problems of the modern age. Upon his arrival, he realizes that President James A. Garfield will be shot the next day, but resists the temptation to intervene. He stays at a boarding house in town and meets Abigail Sloan, a teacher. At one of the boarding house's dinners, a boarder named Hanford, vehemently espouses American imperialism. Paul delivers an angry rebuttal in which he accuses Hanford of speaking from ignorance of war and a certainty that he himself will not have to take part in any fighting, while dropping numerous allusions to wars that have yet to take place. Abigail is impressed and privately tells him that she shares his views, having lost her father and two brothers in the American Civil War. He kisses Abigail, but she becomes alienated when he refuses to explain his earlier remarks about future wars.

A passing remark from a local musician jogs a memory from Paul's vast historical knowledge: Homeville's schoolhouse will burn down because of a kerosene lantern ejected from a runaway wagon, badly injuring twelve children. He resolves to keep his vow not to change the past, but when he spies the lantern in question, he tries to unhitch the horses. The resulting altercation with the wagon owner causes the horses to run wild, inadvertently causing the fire he intended to prevent.

Afterward, Paul tells Abigail that "the past is sacred" and belongs to those who are native to it. He knows too much of the future and fears that he will inevitably cause more mishaps like the schoolhouse fire because of it. He returns to his own time and declares that instead of continuing to fixate upon the past, he will now try to do something to make a better future.

== Closing narration ==
Incident on a July afternoon, 1881. A man named Driscoll who came and went and, in the process, learned a simple lesson, perhaps best said by a poet named Lathbury, who wrote, 'Children of yesterday, heirs of tomorrow, what are you weaving? Labor and sorrow? Look to your looms again, faster and faster fly the great shuttles prepared by the master. Life's in the loom, room for it. Room.' Tonight's tale of clocks and calendars in the Twilight Zone.

== Notes ==
In the Twilight Zone radio drama series with Stacy Keach as the narrator, the first three time travel destinations perpetrated by Driscoll are reversed. He first attempts to board the Lusitania, then attempts to assassinate Hitler, and finally attempts to warn and evacuate Hiroshima. The rest of the story matches with the TV script.

== Cast ==
- Dana Andrews as Paul Driscoll
- Patricia Breslin as Abigail Sloan
- Robert F. Simon as Harvey
- Malcolm Atterbury as Professor Eliot
- Marjorie Bennett as Mrs. Chamberlain
- James Yagi as Japanese Police Captain
- Tudor Owen as Captain of 'Lusitania'
- John Zaremba as Horn Player
- Robert Cornthwaite as Hanford
- Lindsay Workman as Bartender

== See also ==
- Fatalism
- Back There and Of Late I Think of Cliffordville – other The Twilight Zone episodes about a man who tries to change history by traveling to the past.
- Profile in Silver – an episode from the 1985 The Twilight Zone series about trying to change history by traveling to the past.

== Bibliography ==
- DeVoe, Bill. (2008). Trivia from The Twilight Zone. Albany, GA: Bear Manor Media. ISBN 978-1-59393-136-0
- Grams, Martin. (2008). The Twilight Zone: Unlocking the Door to a Television Classic. Churchville, MD: OTR Publishing. ISBN 978-0-9703310-9-0
