= Invisible Avenger =

1958 film by James Wong Howe

Invisible Avenger (1958 film)
- Original American film poster
- Directed by: James Wong Howe; Ben Parker; John Sledge
- Written by: George Bellak (writer); Walter B. Gibson (uncredited); Ruth Jeffries
- Produced by: Emanuel Demby; Eric Sayers
- Starring: Richard Derr; Mark Daniels
- Cinematography: Joseph Wheeler; Willis Winford
- Edited by: John Hemel
- Production company: Republic Pictures
- Distributed by: Republic Pictures
- Release date: December 2, 1958 (United States)
- Running time: 60 minutes
- Country: United States
- Language: English

Invisible Avenger is a 1958 American crime film noir directed by James Wong Howe, Ben Parker and John Sledge. The film combines two television pilot episodes of a failed 1957 Republic Pictures show titled The Shadow. The episodes were shot on location in New Orleans.

The film was rereleased in 1962 under the title of Bourbon Street Shadows. The 1994 film adaptation of The Shadow adopted two visual elements from this production: The Shadow’s own shadow being visible while his power is active, and a horizontal shaft of light highlighting the character’s eyes while using his mental abilities.

== Plot ==
Pablo Ramirez is an expatriate from the Caribbean nation of Santa Cruz that is under control of a military dictator known as the Generalissimo. From New Orleans, Ramirez plots a revolution and his return to Santa Cruz.

To assist in his goal and to protect him from the Santa Cruz secret police who are in New Orleans, Ramirez seeks the help of Lamont Cranston through a mutual friend, jazz trumpeter Tony Alcalde. In the midst of a telephone call to Cranston, Tony is murdered by the secret police. Cranston and his metaphysical mentor Jogendra come to New Orleans to bring Tony's murderers to justice and freedom to Santa Cruz.

Although no one knows the identity of The Shadow, a crime-fighting character with telepathic powers, everyone knows that he can be contacted for help through Cranston. As Cranston protects Pablo from assassination and kidnapping attempts, the Generalissimo broadcasts the execution of Pablo's twin brother that is shown on television in the United States in a scheme to draw Pablo into the open.

== Cast ==
- Richard Derr as Lamont Cranston/The Shadow
- Mark Daniels as Jogendra
- Helen Westcott as Tara O'Neill
- Jack Donner as Billy Sanchez
- Jeanne Neher as Felicia Ramirez
- Steve Dano as Tony Alcalde
- Dan Mullin as Pablo Ramirez / Victor Ramirez
- Leo Bruno as Ramon "Rocco" Martinez
- Lee Edwards as The Colonel
- Sam Page as Charlie, airport thug

== Reception ==
Leonard Maltin said: "[...] [M]ildly interesting, but no feather in the cap of great cinematographer Howe. Derr is quite good.
