= James Wong Howe =

American cinematographer (1899–1976)

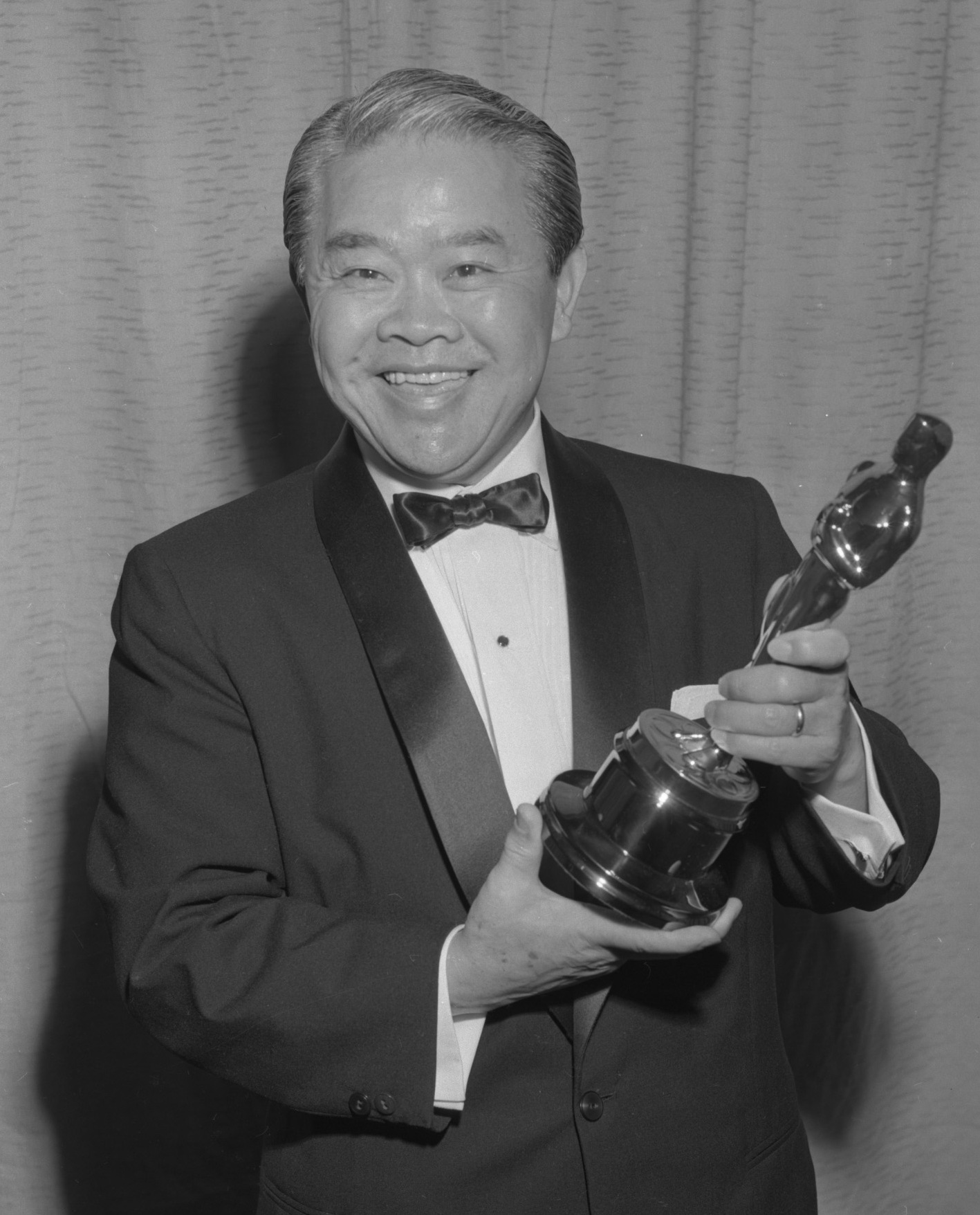
- Howe winning the 1956 Academy Award for Best Cinematography
- Born: Wong Tung Jim; August 28, 1899; Taishan, Guangdong, China
- Died: July 12, 1976 (aged 76); Los Angeles, California, U.S.
- Occupations: Cinematographer; film director
- Years active: 1917–1975
- Spouse(s): Sanora Babb (m. 1937) (marriage not recognized in California until 1948)

Chinese name
- Traditional Chinese: 黃宗霑
- Simplified Chinese: 黄宗霑
Transcriptions
Standard Mandarin
- Hanyu Pinyin: Huáng Zōngzhān
- Wade–Giles: Huang2 Tsung1-chan1
Yue: Cantonese
- Yale Romanization: Wòhng Jūng-jīm
- Jyutping: wong4 zung1 zim1

Signature
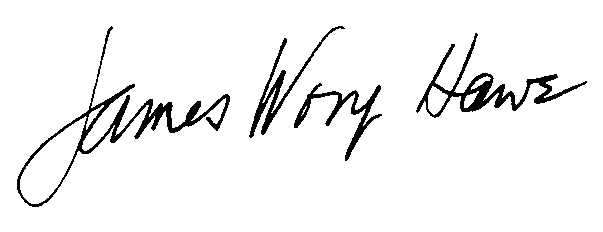

James Wong Howe, ASC (born Wong Tung Jim, Chinese: 黃宗霑; August 28, 1899 – July 12, 1976) was a Chinese-born American cinematographer and film director, who worked on over 130 films during the Golden Age of Hollywood and well into the 1970s. During the 1930s and 1940s, he was one of the most sought after cinematographers in Hollywood due to his innovative filming techniques. Howe was known as a master of the use of shadow and one of the first to use deep-focus cinematography.

Born in Guangdong, Howe immigrated to the United States at age five and grew up in Washington. He was a professional boxer during his teenage years, and later began his career in the film industry as an assistant to Cecil B. DeMille. Howe pioneered the use of wide-angle lenses and low-key lighting, as well as the use of the crab dolly.

Despite the success of his professional life, Howe faced significant racial discrimination in his private life. He became an American citizen only after the repeal of the Chinese Exclusion Act in 1943, and due to anti-miscegenation laws, his marriage to Sanora Babb, a white woman, was not legally recognized in the state of California until 1948.

Howe earned 10 nominations for the Academy Award for Best Cinematography, winning twice, once for The Rose Tattoo (1955), and once more for Hud (1963). He also received Oscar nominations for Algiers (1938), Abe Lincoln in Illinois (1940), Kings Row (1942), The North Star (1943), Air Force (1943), The Old Man and the Sea (1958), Seconds (1966), and Funny Lady (1975). He was selected as one of the 10 most influential cinematographers in a survey of the members of the International Cinematographers Guild.

== Early life ==
Howe was born Wong Tung Jim (Chinese: 黃宗霑; pinyin: Huáng Zōngzhān) in Taishan, Canton Province (now Guangdong), Qing China in 1899. His father Wong Howe moved to America that year to work on the Northern Pacific Railway and in 1904 sent for his family. The Howes settled in Pasco, Washington, where they owned a general store. A Brownie camera, said to have been bought at Pasco Drug (a now-closed city landmark) when he was a child, sparked an early interest in photography.

After his father's death, the teenaged Howe moved to Oregon to live with his uncle and briefly considered (1915–16) a career as a bantamweight boxer. After compiling a record of 5 wins, 2 losses and a draw, Howe moved to the San Francisco Bay Area in hopes of attending aviation school but ran out of money and went south to Los Angeles. Once there, Howe took several odd jobs, including work as a commercial photographer's delivery boy and as a busboy at the Beverly Hills Hotel.

== Career ==
After a chance encounter with a former boxing colleague who was photographing a Mack Sennett short on the streets of Los Angeles, Howe approached cinematographer Alvin Wyckoff and landed a low-level job in the film lab at Famous Players–Lasky studios. Soon thereafter he was called to the set of The Little American to act as an extra clapper boy, which brought him into contact with silent film director Cecil B. DeMille in 1917. Amused by the sight of the diminutive Asian holding the slate with a large cigar in his mouth, DeMille kept Howe on and launched his career as a camera assistant. To earn additional money, Howe took publicity stills for Hollywood stars.

=== Silent film ===
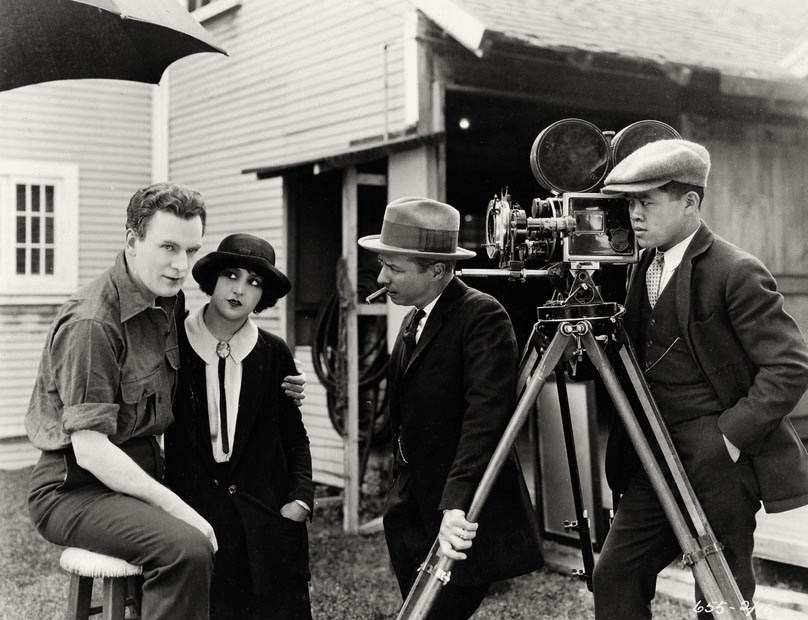
James Wong Howe (rightmost) on the set of silent film The Alaskan. The film itself is now considered lost.

One of those still photographs launched Howe's career as a cinematographer when he stumbled across a means of making silent film star Mary Miles Minter's eyes look darker by photographing her while she was looking at a dark surface. Minter requested that Howe be first cameraman, that is director of photography, on her next feature, and Howe shot Minter's closeups for Drums of Fate by placing black velvet in a large frame around the camera. Throughout his career, Howe retained a reputation for making actresses look their best through lighting alone and seldom resorted to using gauze or other diffusion over the lens to soften their features. Howe worked steadily as a cinematographer from 1923 until the end of the era of silent film.

In 1928, Howe was in China shooting backgrounds for a movie he hoped to direct. The project he was working on was never completed (although some of the footage was used in Shanghai Express), and when he returned to Hollywood, he discovered that the "talkies" had largely supplanted silent productions. With no experience in that medium, Howe could not find work. To reestablish himself, Howe first co-financed a Japanese-language feature shot in Southern California entitled Chijiku wo mawasuru chikara (The Force that Turns the Earth around its Axis), which he also photographed and co-directed. When that film failed to find an audience in California's nisei communities or Japan, Howe shot the low-budget feature Today for no salary. Finally, director/producer Howard Hawks, whom he had met on The Little American, hired him for The Criminal Code and then director William K. Howard selected him to be the cinematographer on Transatlantic.

=== Sound film and the war years ===
“I have a basic approach that goes on from film to film: to make all the sources of light absolutely naturalistic…In color, that’s difficult to control, and I prefer black and white, but we have no more black and white in Hollywood. You can fake a ‘true’ look in the colour laboratory but then it becomes an achievement of chemistry, not of cinematography.”—Cinematographer James Wong Howe.

Howe's innovative work on Transatlantic reestablished him as one of the leading cinematographers in Hollywood, and he worked continuously through the 1930s and 1940s, generally on several movies per year. Howe gained a reputation as a perfectionist who could be difficult to work with, often overruling and even berating other members of the film crew. In a 1945 issue of The Screen Writer, Howe stated his views of a cameraman's responsibility, writing in The Cameraman Talks Back that "[t]he cameraman confers with the director on: (a) the composition of shots for action, since some scenes require definite composition for their best dramatic effect, while others require the utmost fluidity, or freedom from any strict definition or stylization; (b) atmosphere; (c) the dramatic mood of the story, which they plan together from beginning to end; (d) the action of the piece." Howe's broad view of a cinematographer's responsibilities reflected those established for first cameramen in silent films and continued through the studio era where most directors were also contract employees mainly in charge of actor performances.

Howe was nominated for an Academy Award in 1944 in the "Best Cinematography: Black-and-White" category for his work on the movie Air Force, a nomination he shared with Elmer Dyer, A.S.C., and Charles A. Marshall.

In the early 1930s, while at MGM, Howe, who had generally been billed as "James Howe", began listing his name in film credits as "James Wong Howe". Over the course of his career, he was also credited as "James How", "Jimmie Howe", and "James Wong How." Often publicized as a Chinese cameraman, Howe was prevented from becoming a U.S. citizen until the repeal of the Chinese Exclusion Act in 1943. Prior to World War II, Howe met his future wife, novelist Sanora Babb, whom he married in 1937 in Paris. Due to anti-miscegenation laws, the marriage would not be legally recognized in the state of California until 1948. Babb died in 2005, aged 98.

=== Post-war work ===
After the end of World War II, Howe's long-term contract with Warner Bros. lapsed, and he visited China to work on a documentary about rickshaw boys. When he returned Howe found himself gray-listed. While never a Communist, Howe was named in testimony as a sympathizer. Howe and his wife Sanora Babb, who had been a member of the Communist Party, moved to Mexico for a time. Howe was cinematographer for the RKO movie Mr. Blandings Builds His Dream House (1948) starring Cary Grant, Myrna Loy and Melvyn Douglas. Howe had trouble finding employment until writer/director Samuel Fuller hired him to shoot The Baron of Arizona released in 1950.

Again reestablished, Howe's camerawork continued to be highly regarded. In 1949 he shot tests and was hired for a never made comeback film starring Greta Garbo (a screen adaptation of Balzac's La Duchesse de Langeais). In 1956, Howe won his first Academy Award for The Rose Tattoo. The film's director Daniel Mann originally had been a stage director and later stated that he gave Howe control over almost all decisions about the filming other than those regarding the actors and dialogue. In Sweet Smell of Success (1957), Howe worked with director Alexander Mackendrick to give the black-and-white film a sharp-edged look reminiscent of New York tabloid photography such as that taken by Arthur "Weegee" Fellig. During the 1950s, Howe directed his only English-language feature films, Invisible Avenger, one of many film adaptations of The Shadow, and Go Man Go, a movie about the Harlem Globetrotters. Neither was a critical or commercial success. In 1961 Howe directed episodes of Checkmate and 87th Precinct, then returned to cinematography.

=== Later life and work ===
Howe's best known work was almost entirely in black and white. His two Academy Awards both came during the period when Best Cinematography Oscars were awarded separately for color and black-and-white films. However, he successfully made the transition to color films and earned his first Academy Award nomination for a color film in 1958 for The Old Man and the Sea. He won his second Academy Award for 1963's Hud. His cinematography remained inventive during his later career. For instance, his use of fish-eye and wide-angle lenses in Seconds (1966) helped give an eerie tension to director John Frankenheimer's science fiction movie.

During the mid to late 1960s, he taught cinematography at UCLA's Film School. Some of his students include Dean Cundey, Stephen H. Burum, and Alex Funke. Howe would take a minimal set and teach how to achieve a particular mood and style with just lighting. Cundey said, "it was my most valuable class I took in film school" and it changed his career direction to cinematography.

After working on The Molly Maguires (1970), Howe's health began to fail, and he entered semi-retirement. In 1974, he was well enough to be selected as a replacement cinematographer for Funny Lady. He collapsed during the filming; American Society of Cinematographers president Ernest Laszlo filled in for Howe while he was recovering in the hospital. Funny Lady earned Howe his tenth and final Oscar nomination.

Association of Asian Pacific American Artists created the James Wong Howe Award in his honor. Past winners of "The Jimmie" have included Arthur Dong, Genny Lim, and Jude Narita.

== Personal life ==
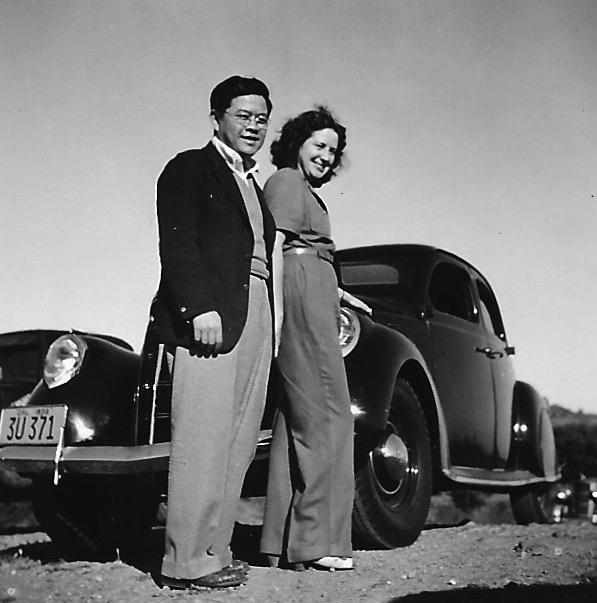
Howe with his wife, Sanora Babb

Howe met his wife, Sanora Babb, before World War II. They traveled to Paris in 1937 to marry, but their marriage was not recognized by the state of California until 1948, after the law banning interracial marriage was abolished. Due to the ban, the "morals clause" in Howe's studio contracts prohibited him from publicly acknowledging his marriage to Babb. They would not cohabit due to his traditional Chinese views, so they had separate apartments in the same building.

During the early years of the House Un-American Activities Committee hearings, Howe was graylisted due to supposedly having Communist ties from his marriage to Babb; she moved to Mexico City to protect Howe.

== Technical innovations ==
“[I] enjoy odd results. Off-beat things, unpredictable things. I believe they increase realism. And realism comes first with me, always.”— James Wong Howe

Howe's earliest discovery was the use of black velvet to make blue eyes show up better on the orthochromatic film stock in use until the early 1920s. Orthochromatic film was "blue blind"; it was sensitive to blue and green light, which showed as white on the developed film. Reds and yellows were darkened. Faced with the problem of actors' eyes appearing washed out or even stark white on film, Howe developed a technique of mounting a frame swathed with black velvet around his camera so that the reflections darkened the actors' eyes enough for them to appear more natural in the developed film.

Howe earned the nickname "Low-Key Howe" because of his penchant for dramatic lighting and deep shadows, a technique that came to be associated with film noir. Later in his career, as film-stocks became faster and more sensitive, Howe continued to experiment with his photography and lighting techniques, such as shooting one scene in The Molly Maguires solely by candlelight.

Howe also was known for his use of unusual lenses, film stocks, and shooting techniques. For the 1927 film The Rough Riders, Howe created an early version of a crab dolly, a form of camera dolly with four independent wheels and a movable arm to which the camera is attached. For the boxing scenes of Body and Soul (1947), he entered the boxing ring on roller-skates, carrying an early hand-held camera. Picnic (1955) features a very early example of the helicopter shot, filmed by the second-unit cinematographer, Haskell Wexler, and planned by Wexler and Howe.

Howe mentored other minority cinematographers, such as John Alonzo, who shot Chinatown and many other productions in the 1970s, 1980s, and 1990s. Alonzo credited Howe with giving him his big break on the film Seconds as a camera operator, doing hand-held sequences during the wild party scenes with Rock Hudson. Alonzo became known for his hand-held technique.

Howe also shot The Outrage, a remake of Rashomon. During the chase scenes through the woods, Howe had the actors run around him in a circle, which when filmed, looks like a chase. Alonzo used this technique in Sounder, in the wooded chase sequence.

Although the innovation of deep focus cinematography is usually associated with Gregg Toland, Howe used it in his first sound film, Transatlantic, 10 years before Toland used the technique in Citizen Kane. For deep focus, the cinematographer narrows the aperture of the camera lens, and floods the set with light, so that elements in both the foreground and background remain in sharp focus. The technique requires highly sensitive film and was difficult to achieve with early film stocks. Along with Toland and Arthur Edeson, Howe was among the earliest cinematographers to use it successfully.

== Filmography ==
=== Director ===
==== Film ====
Year	Title	Notes
1930	Chijiku wo mawasuru chikara	
1953	The World of Dong Kingman	Documentary short
1954	Go Man Go	
1958	Invisible Avenger	Co-directed with Ben Parker and John Sledge
1963	Biography of a Rookie: The Willie Davis Story	Co-directed with Mel Stuart
1963	The Small World	

==== Television ====
Year	Title	Notes
1961	87th Precinct	Episode: "The Modus Man"
1961	Checkmate	Episodes: "State of Shock", "Kill the Sound"

=== Cinematographer ===
Feature films

Year	Title	Director	Notes
1923	Drums of Fate	Charles Maigne	
1923	The Trail of the Lonesome Pine	Charles Maigne	
1923	The Woman With Four Faces	Herbert Brenon	
1923	To the Last Man	Victor Fleming	With Bert Baldridge
1923	The Spanish Dancer	Herbert Brenon	
1923	The Call of the Canyon	Victor Fleming	
1924	The Breaking Point	Herbert Brenon	
1924	The Side Show of Life	Herbert Brenon	
1924	The Alaskan	Herbert Brenon	
1924	Peter Pan	Herbert Brenon	
1925	The Charmer	Sidney Olcott	
1925	Not So Long Ago	Sidney Olcott	
1925	The Best People	Sidney Olcott	
1925	The King on Main Street	Monta Bell	
1926	The Song and Dance Man	Herbert Brenon	
1926	Sea Horses	Allan Dwan	
1926	Mantrap	Victor Fleming	
1926	Padlocked	Allan Dwan	
1927	The Rough Riders	Victor Fleming	With E. Burton Steene
1927	Sorrell and Son	Herbert Brenon	
1928	Laugh, Clown, Laugh	Herbert Brenon	
1928	The Perfect Crime	Bert Glennon	
1928	Four Walls	William Nigh	
1929	The Rescue	Herbert Brenon	Uncredited
1929	Desert Nights	William Nigh	
1930	Today	William Nigh	
1930	Chijiku wo mawasuru chikara	Himself	
1930	The Criminal Code	Howard Hawks	With Ted Tetzlaff
1931	Transatlantic	William K. Howard	
1931	The Spider	Kenneth MacKenna; William Cameron Menzies	
1931	The Yellow Ticket	Raoul Walsh	
1931	Surrender	William K. Howard	
1932	Dance Team	Sidney Lanfield	
1932	Shanghai Express	Josef von Sternberg	Uncredited; shot Chinese location footage.
1932	After Tomorrow	Frank Borzage	
1932	Amateur Daddy	John G. Blystone	
1932	Man About Town	John Francis Dillon	
1932	Chandu the Magician	William Cameron Menzies; Marcel Varnel	
1933	Hello, Sister!		
1933	The Power and the Glory	William K. Howard	
1933	Beauty for Sale	Richard Boleslawski	
1934	The Show-Off	Charles Reisner	
1934	Viva Villa!	Jack Conway	With Charles G. Clarke
1934	Manhattan Melodrama	W. S. Van Dyke	
1934	Hollywood Party		
1934	The Thin Man	W. S. Van Dyke	
1934	Stamboul Quest	Sam Wood	
1934	Have a Heart	David Butler	
1935	Biography of a Bachelor Girl	Edward H. Griffith	
1935	The Night Is Young	Dudley Murphy	
1935	Mark of the Vampire	Tod Browning	
1935	The Flame Within	Edmund Goulding	
1935	O'Shaughnessy's Boy	Richard Boleslawski	
1935	Rendezvous	William K. Howard	Uncredited; reshoots directed by Sam Wood
1935	Whipsaw	Sam Wood	
1936	Little Lord Fauntleroy	John Cromwell	Uncredited; 2nd unit photography
1936	Three Live Ghosts	H. Bruce Humberstone	With Chester A. Lyons
1937	Fire Over England	William K. Howard	
1937	Farewell Again	Tim Whelan	With Hans Schneeberger
1937	Under the Red Robe	Victor Sjöström	With Georges Périnal
1937	The Prisoner of Zenda	John Cromwell	
1938	The Adventures of Tom Sawyer	Norman Taurog	
1938	Algiers	John Cromwell	
1938	Comet Over Broadway	Busby Berkeley	
1939	They Made Me a Criminal	Busby Berkeley	
1939	The Oklahoma Kid	Lloyd Bacon	
1939	Daughters Courageous	Michael Curtiz	
1939	Dust Be My Destiny	Lewis Seiler	
1939	On Your Toes	Ray Enright	
1939	Four Wives	Michael Curtiz	Uncredited
1940	Abe Lincoln in Illinois	John Cromwell	
1940	Dr. Ehrlich's Magic Bullet	William Dieterle	
1940	Saturday's Children	Vincent Sherman	
1940	Torrid Zone	William Keighley	
1940	My Love Came Back	Curtis Bernhardt	Uncredited
1940	City for Conquest	Anatole Litvak	With Sol Polito
1940	A Dispatch from Reuters	William Dieterle	
1940	Fantasia		Live-action segments
1941	The Strawberry Blonde	Raoul Walsh	
1941	Shining Victory	Irving Rapper	
1941	Out of the Fog	Anatole Litvak	
1941	Navy Blues	Lloyd Bacon	Dance sequences
1942	Kings Row	Sam Wood	
1942	Yankee Doodle Dandy	Michael Curtiz	
1943	The Hard Way	Vincent Sherman	
1943	Air Force	Howard Hawks	
1943	Hangmen Also Die!	Fritz Lang	
1943	The North Star	Lewis Milestone	
1944	Passage to Marseille	Michael Curtiz	
1945	Objective, Burma!	Raoul Walsh	
1945	Counter-Attack	Zoltan Korda	
1945	Confidential Agent	Herman Shumlin	
1945	Danger Signal	Robert Florey	
1946	My Reputation	Curtis Bernhardt	
1947	Nora Prentiss	Vincent Sherman	
1947	Pursued	Raoul Walsh	
1947	Body and Soul	Robert Rossen	
1948	Mr. Blandings Builds His Dream House	H. C. Potter	
1948	The Time of Your Life	H. C. Potter	
1950	The Baron of Arizona	Samuel Fuller	
1950	The Eagle and the Hawk	Lewis R. Foster	
1950	Tripoli	Will Price	
1951	The Brave Bulls	Robert Rossen	With Floyd Crosby
1951	He Ran All the Way	John Berry	
1951	Behave Yourself!	George Beck	
1951	The Lady Says No	Frank Ross	
1952	The Fighter	Herbert Kline	
1952	Come Back, Little Sheba	Daniel Mann	
1953	Main Street to Broadway	Tay Garnett	
1953	Terminal Station	Vittorio De Sica	Uncredited; shot additional footage for U.S. recut directed by William Cameron Menzies
1953	Jennifer	Joel Newton	
1955	The Rose Tattoo	Daniel Mann	
1955	Picnic	Joshua Logan	
1956	Death of a Scoundrel	Charles Martin	
1957	Drango	Hall Bartlett; Jules Bricken	
1957	Sweet Smell of Success	Alexander Mackendrick	
1957	A Farewell to Arms	Charles Vidor	Uncredited reshoots
1958	The Old Man and the Sea	John Sturges	
1958	Bell, Book and Candle	Richard Quine	
1959	The Last Angry Man	Daniel Mann	
1959	The Story on Page One	Clifford Odets	
1960	Song Without End	Charles Vidor	
1960	Tess of the Storm Country	Paul Guilfoyle	
1963	Hud	Martin Ritt	
1964	The Outrage	Martin Ritt	
1965	The Glory Guys	Arnold Laven	
1966	Seconds	John Frankenheimer	
1966	This Property Is Condemned	Sydney Pollack	
1967	Hombre	Martin Ritt	
1968	The Heart Is a Lonely Hunter	Robert Ellis Miller	
1970	Last of the Mobile Hot Shots	Sidney Lumet	
1970	The Molly Maguires	Martin Ritt	
1971	The Horsemen	John Frankenheimer	Uncredited; additional Afghanistan unit photography
1975	Funny Lady	Herbert Ross	

Short film

Year	Title	Director	Notes
1937	Hollywood Party	Roy Rowland	Uncredited
1938	It Might Be You	R.M. Lloyd	With Bernard Browne
1953	The World of Dong Kingman	Himself	Documentary short
1954	Autumn in Rome	William Cameron Menzies	Originally filmed as additional footage for U.S. recut of Terminal Station

TV documentary

Year	Title	Director	Notes
1954	Light's Diamond Jubilee	King Vidor; William A. Wellman; Norman Taurog; Christian Nyby; Roy Rowland; Alan Handley; Bud Yorkin	With Ray June
1963	Biography of a Rookie: The Willie Davis Story	Himself; Mel Stuart	
1963	The Small World	Himself	

TV series

Year	Title	Director	Notes
1955	Screen Directors Playhouse	H. C. Potter	Episode "Lincoln's Doctor's Dog"
1967	ABC Stage 67	Noel Black	Episode "Trilogy: The American Boy - Skaterdater/The River Boy/Reflections"

== Awards and nominations ==
Award	Year	Category	Title	Result
Academy Award	1938	Best Cinematography	Algiers	Nominated
Academy Award	1940	Best Cinematography	Abe Lincoln in Illinois	Nominated
Academy Award	1942	Best Cinematography	Kings Row	Nominated
Academy Award	1943	Best Cinematography	The North Star	Nominated
Academy Award	1943	Best Cinematography	Air Force	Nominated
Academy Award	1955	Best Cinematography	The Rose Tattoo	Won
Academy Award	1958	Best Cinematography	The Old Man and the Sea	Nominated
Academy Award	1963	Best Cinematography	Hud	Won
Academy Award	1966	Best Cinematography	Seconds	Nominated
Academy Award	1975	Best Cinematography	Funny Lady	Nominated
Laurel Award	1959	Top Cinematographer - Color	The Old Man and the Sea	Won
Laurel Award	1970	Cinematographer	The Heart Is a Lonely Hunter	Won

In 2003, Howe was selected as one of the 10 most influential cinematographers in a survey of the members of the International Cinematographers Guild.
