= Art Modell =

American businessman (1925–2012)

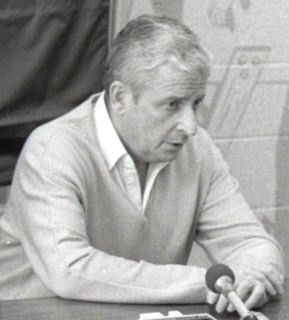
- Modell at a press conference in 1983
- Born: Arthur Bertram Modell; June 23, 1925; Brooklyn, New York City, U.S.
- Died: September 6, 2012 (aged 87); Baltimore, Maryland, U.S.
- Occupations: NFL franchise owner Cleveland Browns (1961–1996); Baltimore Ravens (1996–2004); Businessman
- Spouse: Patricia Breslin (m. 1969; died 2011)
- Children: 2 (David Modell and John Modell)
- Awards: NFL champion (1964); Super Bowl XXXV champion

Arthur Bertram Modell (June 23, 1925 – September 6, 2012) was an American businessman, entrepreneur and National Football League (NFL) team owner. He owned the Cleveland Browns franchise for 35 years and established the Baltimore Ravens franchise, which he owned for eight years.

Assuming control of the Browns franchise in 1961, Modell was a key figure in helping promote the NFL and was initially popular in Cleveland for his active role in the community and his efforts to improve the team. However, he made controversial actions during his ownership, which included the firing of Paul Brown, the franchise's first coach and namesake, and the release of Jim Brown from the roster. In 1995, Modell faced widespread scorn in Cleveland when he attempted to relocate the Browns to Baltimore. Under the terms of an NFL-brokered settlement, Modell left the Browns' name and heritage in Cleveland, which was assumed by a new Browns team in 1999. In return, Modell retained the contracts of all Browns personnel and reconstituted his organization as the Baltimore Ravens, who are officially recognized as a 1996 expansion team.

Praised in Baltimore for returning football to the city after the departure of the Colts, Modell remains a controversial figure in Cleveland due to the relocation and, in particular, for his decision-making around the management of Cleveland Stadium and the construction of a replacement.

== Early life and education ==
Modell was born to a Jewish family in Brooklyn, New York. His father George was a wine sales manager who went bankrupt after the stock market crash of 1929 and later died when Modell was 14. Modell attended New Utrecht High School. Modell saw his first football game when he was nine years old. At the age of 15, Modell left high school to help support his family. His first job was cleaning the hulls of ships in a Brooklyn shipyard.

In 1943, when he was 18, he joined the United States Army Air Forces. After his service during World War II, he enrolled in a New York City television school under the G.I. Bill. In 1947, he founded his own production company with a fellow student and in 1949, they produced one of the first daytime shows in the country, Market Melodies, dedicated to cooking and decorating. Modell sold the idea of his show to the Grand Union grocery store chain and Modell installed televisions, at his expense, in the aisles of the chain's stores where the show soon became very popular. At the time, very few households had televisions so the store format was wildly successful. In 1954, using the lucrative Grand Union account as leverage, he was hired as a senior account executive at the advertising company L.H. Hartman Co. in New York City, eventually becoming a partner. Formed after the Prohibition era, L.H. Hartman was primarily involved in liquor advertising. In 1958, Modell bought an upstate New York champagne maker, Gold Seal Vineyards Inc. In 1960, L.H. Hartman was dissolved, and Modell again used his Grand Union account to land a job as senior vice president at the advertising firm Kastor, Hilton, Chesley, Clifford & Atherton.

== Owner of the Cleveland Browns (1961–1995) ==
During the 1940s and 1950s, Modell worked in advertising, public relations, and television production in New York City. In 1960, Modell had heard from someone close to Fred "Curly" Morrison, a former Browns running back who worked as an advertising executive for CBS television, that the Cleveland Browns were going to be up for sale. The two most prominent parties interested in the Browns (which had the Nationwide Insurance Company as the largest Browns shareholder among various Cleveland businessmen such as Dave R. Jones) was a group led by Bill Evans of Diamond Alkali and the other was a group headlined by a group of Rudy Schaefer of the Schaefer Brewing Company and various investors to go with Modell. It was noted that head coach Paul Brown, present since the team was founded, was the key last word on any potential sale of the team, as league executives trusted him best about maintaining stability, particularly since Brown was negotiating a contract that would pay him $50,000 a year for eight years with the new group. At any rate, it was announced in January 1961 that the Modell group would purchase the team for roughly $4 million, with Modell having contributed a portion from his own personal funds and also taking out a loan for several thousands of dollars more. Named as the chairman of the team, he was quoted at the time as having called the team "my only business and I am going to keep my hands on it."

=== Modell & Paul Brown (1961–1963) ===
In Modell's first season as owner in 1961, though the number of each NFL team's regular-season games increased from 12 in 1960 to 14 in 1961, the Browns won the same number of games that they had won in 1960: eight, which was only good enough for third place. Right before the start of the 1962 season, without Modell's knowledge, Brown traded away All-Pro Bobby Mitchell and first-round draft pick Leroy Jackson for Heisman Trophy winner Ernie Davis, who had been selected first overall in the NFL draft by the Washington Redskins but refused to play for Redskins owner George Preston Marshall. Brown had enjoyed more or less a free hand in football matters for 16 years, and never told Modell about the trade. Modell first heard about the trade afterwards from Marshall, who was surprised to realize that Modell hadn't known about it. Modell recalled being told by Marshall that he "better get out of the business if you don't know what's going on in your own franchise." Modell proceeded to chide Brown about the deal made behind his back. Davis was shortly thereafter diagnosed with terminal leukemia, and some doctors felt that Davis playing football would not exacerbate his condition. He began a conditioning program in preparation to play in the regular season and desired to be a part of the team. Brown and Modell's working relationship was permanently strained after Brown then, against Modell's wishes, continuously refused to play Davis. Davis died the following year without ever playing a snap. By that point, the rift between Brown and some of his players, such as quarterback Milt Plum and Jim Brown, who openly questioned Brown's coaching methods and demeanor, grew too much to bear. Players took concerns to Modell. The new owner was closer to the players' age, and they felt they could better relate to him than the older, more disciplinarian head coach. Three weeks after a season that saw the Browns win seven games and finish in third place again, Modell had made up his mind. Modell fired Brown on January 9, 1963, which happened to occur in the middle of a newspaper strike in Cleveland. When asked at the time about his reasoning, he stated that there were two important ones among the "maybe 25 reasons why", which involved his belief that the maximum potential of the team was not being realized and that at least seven players were not willing to come back to the team for 1963 under the same conditions as 1962. He later named Brown's longtime assistant, Blanton Collier, as the new head coach on January 16, 1963.

=== Browns win NFL Championship Game (1964) ===
After three non-playoff seasons, the 1964 Browns finished 10–3–1 and appeared in the 1964 NFL Championship Game against a heavily favored Don Shula-coached Baltimore Colts team with Pro Football Hall of Fame quarterback Johnny Unitas as its signal caller. The Browns beat the Colts 27–0 in Cleveland Municipal Stadium. This particular Browns team consisted of many players initially drafted and acquired by Brown.

During the next 30 years in Cleveland, not a single Modell team would win the league title. The Browns would advance to the NFL/AFC championship title games six more times during his ownership in Cleveland and lose them all.

=== Modell's team promotions ===
Using his background in advertising to market the team, Modell showed a flair for promotions, with one popular innovation coming in 1962 by scheduling pro football preseason doubleheaders at Cleveland Stadium. Modell also became active in NFL leadership, serving as NFL President from 1967 to 1969, and using his television connections to help negotiate the league's increasingly lucrative television contracts. Under his tenure, the NFL Players Association was formally recognized by the owners in 1968 as a representative of the players that (after a brief strike) resulted in the first NFL collective bargaining agreement being reached.

It was he who agreed to move his team (alongside the Baltimore Colts and the Pittsburgh Steelers) to the newly formed American Football Conference as part of the AFL–NFL merger in 1970. Modell was willing to provide his team as an opponent for both the first prime time Thanksgiving game in 1966 and the opening Monday Night Football broadcast in 1970. He was chairman of the league Television Committee from 1962 to 1993. At the time he joined the committee, the league was negotiating deals for TV at a price of $14 million. By the time of the last deal Modell was involved with in 1990, the league had made a television deal for $3.6 billion.

=== Community involvement in Cleveland area ===
Modell took an active role in Cleveland community life and was a leading fundraiser for charities and various Republican Party candidates. He married TV soap opera star Patricia Breslin in 1969, having previously been a well-known bachelor and man about town. For many years he was able to disarm newspaper and TV reporters with his quick wit. For example, with regard to the NFL's innovative policy of sharing all network television revenue on an equal basis per team, so that the Green Bay Packers and New York Giants each got an equal slice of the revenue, Modell joked that the NFL is run by "a bunch of fat-cat Republicans who vote socialist on football."

=== Player contract battles ===
In the offseason after the 1965 season, Jim Brown was in England for the shooting of The Dirty Dozen. Modell threatened him with fines when it came to the question of missing portions of training camp. Insulted, Brown retired from football in July 1966.

In 1967, five African American members of the Browns involved in a contract dispute refused to report to training camp. Modell eventually traded or released four of the players, with only standout running back Leroy Kelly staying. Kelly would go on to "play out his option" but the restrictive nature of free agency in the NFL at the time severely limited his options. Subsequent contract battles included various stars and free agents that did not pan out. In 1977, the Browns drafted a punter, Tom Skladany, in the second round. His agent was Howard Slusher, who was described by Modell as a significant thorn in the side of pro football. When Modell wouldn't budge on the pay for Skladany in the contract discussion, Skladany sat out the whole season. Chip Banks, who won the 1982 Defensive Player of the Year honors with the team, went through consecutive contract holdouts (one of which was to try and negotiate a loan forgiven by Modell) and was even considered to be traded for a supplemental draft pick. It eventually resulted in a trade away from Cleveland.

By 1990, fan animosity manifested itself with anti-Modell stadium banners that were quickly removed by Cleveland Stadium management, which only inspired fans to decide to get creative by buying planes to fly signs near the stadium or to use steel girders with anti-Modell statements. In March 1995, the Browns agreed to a five-year, $17-million deal with free-agent wide receiver Andre Rison. The deal came only after Modell (who labeled him as the biggest star signed by the Browns) had to personally guarantee a $5 million loan for the signing bonus. Modell's statement about needing to take out the loan made Rison believe Modell made him a "scapegoat" and stated that he received anonymous death threats afterwards. One year later, the team cut Rison to make way for newly drafted players such as Ray Lewis and Jonathan Ogden.

== As Municipal Stadium landlord (1973–1995) ==
Modell took control of Cleveland Municipal Stadium in 1973, which had been owned by the City of Cleveland but had become too expensive for the city to operate or maintain. Modell had started the idea of buying land in Strongsville and building a stadium in the Cleveland suburbs. He worked out a 25-year lease deal with the city whereby his newly formed entity, dubbed Stadium Corp., would rent the stadium from the city for $1 per year, assume all operating and repair costs and would sublease the stadium to its two primary tenants, the Browns and the Cleveland Indians, Cleveland's franchise in the American League of Major League Baseball.

As head of Stadium Corp., Modell was also the landlord of the Indians organization. This was a sound business decision even though the Indians played poorly and drew small crowds throughout much of the 1970s and 1980s. The Browns, who were paying rent to both themselves and Modell, by constructing loges in the ballpark, generated significant cash flow from the loge rentals not shared with the Indians. Modell later claimed the loge rentals were not profitable as he had financed their construction at the prevailing high interest rates, although he did not explain why the rental income that was earned was not used to offset the debt. The Indians organization became dissatisfied with Modell's Stadium Corp. as its landlord. Modell did not share the loge revenues earned from baseball games with the Indians. Eventually the Indians persuaded City of Cleveland and Cuyahoga County voters to fund a new ballpark (which became known as Jacobs Field, later renamed Progressive Field) through new taxes. In turn, Modell was dissatisfied with the Indians' new ballpark because Stadium Corp.'s suite rental revenue decreased once Jacobs Field opened. Many suite customers switched their business from Cleveland Stadium's older suites to Jacobs Field's newer suites, due to the Indians' new-found success and popularity in the mid-1990s and because Modell's Stadium Corp. refused to decrease the annual rent for the suites even though the events for which the suites could be used decreased substantially (81 home games) with the loss of the Indians as a tenant.

In 1979, Stadium Corp. and Modell were implicated in a lawsuit brought by Browns minority shareholder Robert Gries of Gries Sports Enterprises. He had owned 43 percent of the team. He successfully alleged that Stadium Corp. manipulated the Browns' accounting records to help Stadium Corp. and Modell absorb a loss on real property that had been purchased in the Cleveland suburb of Strongsville as a potential site for a new stadium that had him claiming it was worth more than when he had sold the land to Stadium Corp. The lawsuit eventually ended in favor of Gries (he would later sell his family interest upon the move to Baltimore). Modell was offered a place as a tenant in Cleveland's new Gateway Sports and Entertainment Complex. However, he instead asked for improvements to Municipal Stadium. Because Modell's Stadium Corp. still controlled Municipal Stadium, it may have made more business sense for Modell to try to keep the Indians at Municipal, particularly as the baseball team began to show signs of improvement both on the playing field and at the box office. Modell made attempts to make money with the stadium any way he could, which even included a deal to have the Stadium host Northwestern versus Ohio State on October 19, 1991. The game itself, referred to as "The Modell Bowl" was a dud for Northwestern, but they reaped the benefits moreso than Modell, as the game was thousands short of a sellout. Meanwhile, the Indians went on to play in the World Series in 1995 and 1997, and sold out 455 straight games at Jacobs Field from 1995 until 2001. The City of Cleveland agreed to make the improvements to Municipal Stadium which were to be funded through an extension of the sin tax, which was instead used to provide funding for the Gateway Sports and Entertainment Complex.

== Modell relocates to Baltimore (1996) ==
While the City of Cleveland, Ohio, wanted to improve Municipal Stadium, Modell issued a public moratorium on discussions relating to the stadium issue for the future of his franchise. It was during this time that Modell entered into secret discussions with the State of Maryland to move the franchise to Baltimore for the 1996 season. The Browns were not the first team that received queries about relocation to Baltimore, as they had asked the Cincinnati Bengals earlier in the year about their status that had their team owner visit the city.

The announcement of the move occurred several days before the public referendum on the extension of the sin tax that would fund the improvements on Municipal Stadium as Modell had originally requested. Modell wrote a letter to Cleveland's mayor Michael R. White and Ohio's governor George Voinovich saying that the passing of the referendum may not be enough to keep the Browns. Modell had lost $21 million in the previous two seasons. Modell also wanted that information to be made public. Commentators have speculated that the timing of the announcement was to cause the referendum to go down in defeat and thus allow Modell to make the case that he was not receiving the public support he needed to remain viable in Cleveland. Nonetheless, the referendum was passed by a wide margin. Modell was assisted in the move by Alfred Lerner, who would go on to become the new owner of the reactivated Cleveland Browns franchise in 1998. Modell's move returned the NFL to Baltimore for the first time since the Colts left for Indianapolis after the 1983 season. The reaction in Cleveland was hostile. Modell had promised never to move the team. He had publicly criticized the Baltimore Colts' move to Indianapolis, and had testified in favor of the NFL in court cases where the league unsuccessfully tried to stop Al Davis from moving the Oakland Raiders from Oakland to Los Angeles.

=== The City of Cleveland vs. Cleveland Browns ===
The City of Cleveland sued Modell, the Browns, Stadium Corp, the Maryland Stadium Authority, and the authority's director, John A. Moag Jr., in City of Cleveland v. Cleveland Browns, et al., Cuyahoga County Court of Common Pleas Case No. CV-95-297833, for breaching the Browns' lease, which required the team to play its home games at Cleveland Stadium for several years beyond 1995.

=== Browns franchise deactivated, to resume in '99 ===
Eventually, the NFL and the parties worked out a deal. The Browns' franchise would be deactivated for three years. Modell initially tried to take the Browns name with him to Baltimore. However, as part of a negotiated settlement, Modell agreed that he would leave behind the Browns' name, colors and heritage (including team records) for a replacement franchise, in the form of either a new team or a relocated franchise. In return, Modell was allowed to take the franchise rights, players and organization to Baltimore to form a new team, the Ravens. Cleveland received a loan from the NFL to help with the cost of a new stadium. The Browns returned to the NFL in 1999 with Lerner, a friend of Modell as well as a minority owner of Modell's original franchise and MBNA CEO and owner, assuming ownership, after Lerner outbid other interested parties for the right to buy the reactivated Browns' franchise.

=== The Browns' record under Modell ===
During Modell's 35 seasons as team owner the Browns qualified for the postseason 17 times, winning 11 division titles and the NFL championship in 1964. The team's overall regular season record during Modell's tenure was 278–233–7, (winning percentage .542) with a postseason record of 7–14.

=== Impact of move ===
The move fueled a proliferation of 12 new stadiums throughout the NFL. Using the NFL-City of Cleveland agreement's promise to supply a team to Cleveland by 1999, several NFL franchises coerced their respective cities to build new stadiums with public funds. Such franchises include the Broncos, Eagles, Seahawks, Buccaneers, Bengals, Lions, Cardinals and Colts.

The Minnesota Twins signed a deal with Hennepin County, Minnesota, for Target Field in 2006, where they agreed to a provision that was later codified into law which allows the state of Minnesota the right of first refusal to buy the team if it is ever sold, and requires that the name, colors, World Series trophies, etc. remain in Minnesota if the Twins are ever moved out of state, a deal similar to what Modell agreed to with the city of Cleveland during the move.

In December 2005, the San Jose Earthquakes MLS franchise moved to Houston, Texas, to become the Houston Dynamo. At the time, it was announced by the league that while players and staff would move with the team, the team name, colors, logo, and records (including two championship trophies) would stay in San Jose for when a new expansion team arrives. In 2008, the Earthquakes returned under the ownership of Lew Wolff, a real estate developer, landowner and part-owner of the Oakland Athletics MLB franchise.

When the Seattle SuperSonics moved to Oklahoma City, Oklahoma, in 2008, the owners agreed to leave the "SuperSonics" name, logo, and colors in Seattle for a possible future NBA franchise; however the items would remain the property of the Oklahoma City team along with other "assets" including championship banners and trophies. The team was subsequently renamed the Oklahoma City Thunder. Both the Thunder and any future Seattle NBA team will also "share" the SuperSonics' history.

Modell was a Hall of Fame finalist in 2001 and a semifinalist in 2004, 2005, 2006, 2007, 2009, 2010, and 2011 and was denied each and every time.

The original Browns were considered one of the NFL's flagship franchises, as well as an institution by many Northern Ohioans. He never returned to Cleveland after 1996. When Browns kicking legend Lou "The Toe" Groza died in 2000, Modell did not appear.

=== Browns' final game at Municipal Stadium (1995) ===
When the final game was played in Cleveland Municipal Stadium in 1995, there were more people outside it protesting the move than inside enjoying the potential last Browns game. The protesters were acknowledged by the NBC announcing crew. Several players remained on the field after the game and did laps around the stadium to slap hands with fans, while others took out stadium seats and sod. Modell was not present for the game. Months after the game, the deal to bring the Browns back in 1999 was announced.

== As principal owner of Baltimore Ravens (1996–2004) ==
=== Former Colts players, fans rally around team ===
Many Baltimore fans, including several prominent old-time Colts players who lived in the area, considered the Ravens to be the successors of the Baltimore Colts.

Other retired stars, like Art Donovan, had mixed emotions about the Ravens' arrival: happiness that the great fans of the city now had an NFL team to cheer for again, but also sadness that Cleveland had felt the same loss that Baltimore had in 1984, and a neutral view of the new team itself.

=== Head coaching changes ===
Upon the team's move in 1996, Modell selected former NFL head coach and offensive guru Ted Marchibroda as its new head coach. Marchibroda, who also had been the head of the Colts when they were in Baltimore during the late 1970s, had coached them the previous three seasons in Indianapolis, and they were fresh off of an appearance in a memorable 1995 AFC Championship loss to the Pittsburgh Steelers.

However, the new Ravens still struggled to be competitive and suffered in mediocrity for the first 3 seasons in Baltimore, missing the playoffs each year. In 1999, they hired former NFL assistant coach Brian Billick as the head coach, replacing Marchibroda. Like Marchibroda, Billick, an Ohio native, had been considered one of the brightest offensive minds among the league's offensive coaches, and also had been considered by Modell as a possible Browns head coaching candidate.

=== Super Bowl XXXV ===
In 2000, the Ravens, under the coaching of Billick, qualified for the postseason for the first time, winning the AFC Wild-Card position with a 12–4 record. (Tennessee won their division that year.) Led by a stingy defense anchored by team captain and NFL All-Pro middle linebacker Ray Lewis and quarterbacked by former Pro-Bowler Trent Dilfer, they would go on to defeat the NFC Champion New York Giants in the Super Bowl, 34–7. Shortly after the Super Bowl XXXV victory, Modell handed the reins of the day-to-day operations of the team over to his son, David. In that same year, Modell testified at the murder trial of Lewis on his behalf, and Lewis later described him as "like a father figure". The Ravens qualified again for the postseason in 2001 as defending Super Bowl champions, and once more in 2003, winning their first division title. As an owner of the Ravens, the regular season record during Modell's tenure as team owner was 72–63.

=== Community involvement in Baltimore area ===
Modell and his wife, former television actress Patricia Breslin, donated millions of dollars to a variety of charities, most notably the SEED School, a boarding school being developed in Baltimore for disadvantaged youth; Johns Hopkins Hospital; Kennedy Krieger Institute; St. Vincent's Center, a home for abused children; and the House of Ruth, a domestic violence center. Modell received the Generous Heart Award from Dr. Ben Carson Scholarship Foundation, given annually for excellence in the community.

=== Ravens sold to minority owner Bisciotti ===
Despite a no-cost stadium lease, as well as retaining all revenues from parking, concessions, and TV, as well as a reported $25 million subsidy from the state of Maryland, Modell's ownership of the Ravens resulted in continual financial hardships for the team. In late 2002, the hardships led the NFL to take the unusual step of directing Modell (who had suffered a heart attack and stroke in that same year) to sell his franchise.

In 2003, Modell sold the Ravens to minority owner and Maryland businessman Steve Bisciotti; under the deal, Modell retained a small interest (approximately 1% share) upon the team's sale as a legal maneuver to avoid a claim by the Andrews trust, which was controlled by family of a former business adviser who sought to collect an estimated $30 million finder's fee upon Modell's sale of the team. The Andrews trust essentially claimed that under a 1963 agreement, Modell owed a finder's fee for his original purchase of the team which was to be paid when Modell sold his entire interest. In July 2005, Modell prevailed in court and defeated the Andrews trust's claim. At the time of sale, the franchise's worth was estimated at US$600 million.

Soon after Modell reconstituted his organization in Baltimore in 1996, he had sold a small minority interest to Bisciotti. However, Bisciotti had the option to buy the team fully in right (approximately 99%) until March 2004, this upon becoming a minority owner (about 45%) outright in 1999. On April 9, 2004, the NFL approved Bisciotti's purchase of the majority stake in the club. Modell retained his 1% share and an office at the Ravens' headquarters in Owings Mills, Maryland, as a team consultant.

== Modell in popular culture ==
The furious fan reaction to Modell's planned move of the franchise to Baltimore has been lampooned and chronicled in many media circles, particularly in print and television. On the cover of the December 4, 1995, issue of Sports Illustrated titled "Battle for the Browns", there is a cartoon of Modell punching a Browns fan, adorned with a Browns Helmet/dog and dogbone mask, in the stomach. He was portrayed in the 2008 movie The Express: The Ernie Davis Story, which was about Syracuse running back and Browns draftee Ernie Davis.

An episode of The Drew Carey Show (whose title character and titular actor is a native Clevelander) referenced Modell. During a party at Drew's house, which featured many Cleveland personalities, former Browns quarterback Bernie Kosar asks Drew where the bathroom is. Drew directs Kosar to the bathroom, following with the instruction, "Just don't take a Modell."

== Personal life ==
Modell's only marriage was to Patricia Breslin, lasting from 1969 until her death in 2011. He adopted Breslin's two sons, John and David, from her first marriage to actor David Orrick McDearmon (1914–1979). David would later work for the Browns/Ravens' franchise, eventually become team president and CEO before the team's sale in 2004. As of 2009, Modell and his wife lived in Cockeysville, Maryland. They also retained residences in nearby Owings Mills, Maryland, where son David lived with his family, and Vero Beach, Florida. They had a total of six grandchildren. Patricia died on October 12, 2011, at the age of 80.

Although Modell later retired and had relinquished control of the Ravens, he is still hated in Cleveland, not only for moving the Browns, but also for his firing of head coach Paul Brown in 1963. Some consider the Browns' move and subsequent lawsuits as having cost Modell a spot in the Pro Football Hall of Fame, which is in Canton, Ohio, 60 miles south of Cleveland and part of the Cleveland television market and Browns' territorial rights.

== Death and legacy ==
Modell had a history of coronary disease. He died on September 6, 2012, at Johns Hopkins Hospital in Baltimore, at the age of 87 from natural causes. He had not returned to Cleveland before his death.

The Ravens dedicated the 2012 season to Modell. On Week 1, all team members wore an "Art" decal on their helmets, and for the rest of their season, they wore an "Art" patch on the left side of their jerseys. They would go on to win Super Bowl XLVII.

The Sunday following Modell's death was also the opening weekend of the 2012 NFL season. Each team playing a home game was asked to hold a moment of silence in memory of Modell. However, after much discussion, the Browns elected not to hold a moment of silence, but rather a "brief read over the public address system". Finally, at the request of David Modell, the Browns opted not to commemorate or even mention Modell during their pregame festivities to avoid a negative reaction from the team's fans.

On July 23, 2014, a video surfaced on YouTube of an unidentified Browns fan desecrating the grave of Modell wearing a Lyle Alzado jersey by urinating on the grave through a catheter. Baltimore County filed charges for disorderly conduct at the request of Modell's son David Modell once the fan was identified. The charges were dropped after the fan apologized and appeared on David Modell's radio show.

Art Modell was the grandson of the founder of Modell's Sporting Goods, Morris A. Modell, but had nothing to do with that company. Established in 1889, Modell's was a Northeastern US retail chain that transitioned to online-only after a 2020 bankruptcy reorganization. When Modell Sporting Goods attempted to penetrate Maryland markets, it hoped that a perceived association with Art Modell's Baltimore Ravens would be helpful, but ultimately they were unsuccessful.

Sporting positions
Preceded by Dave Jones	Cleveland Browns owner 1961–1996	Succeeded by Al Lerner
New creation	Baltimore Ravens owner 1996–2004	Succeeded by Steve Bisciotti
