= Richard Derr =

American actor

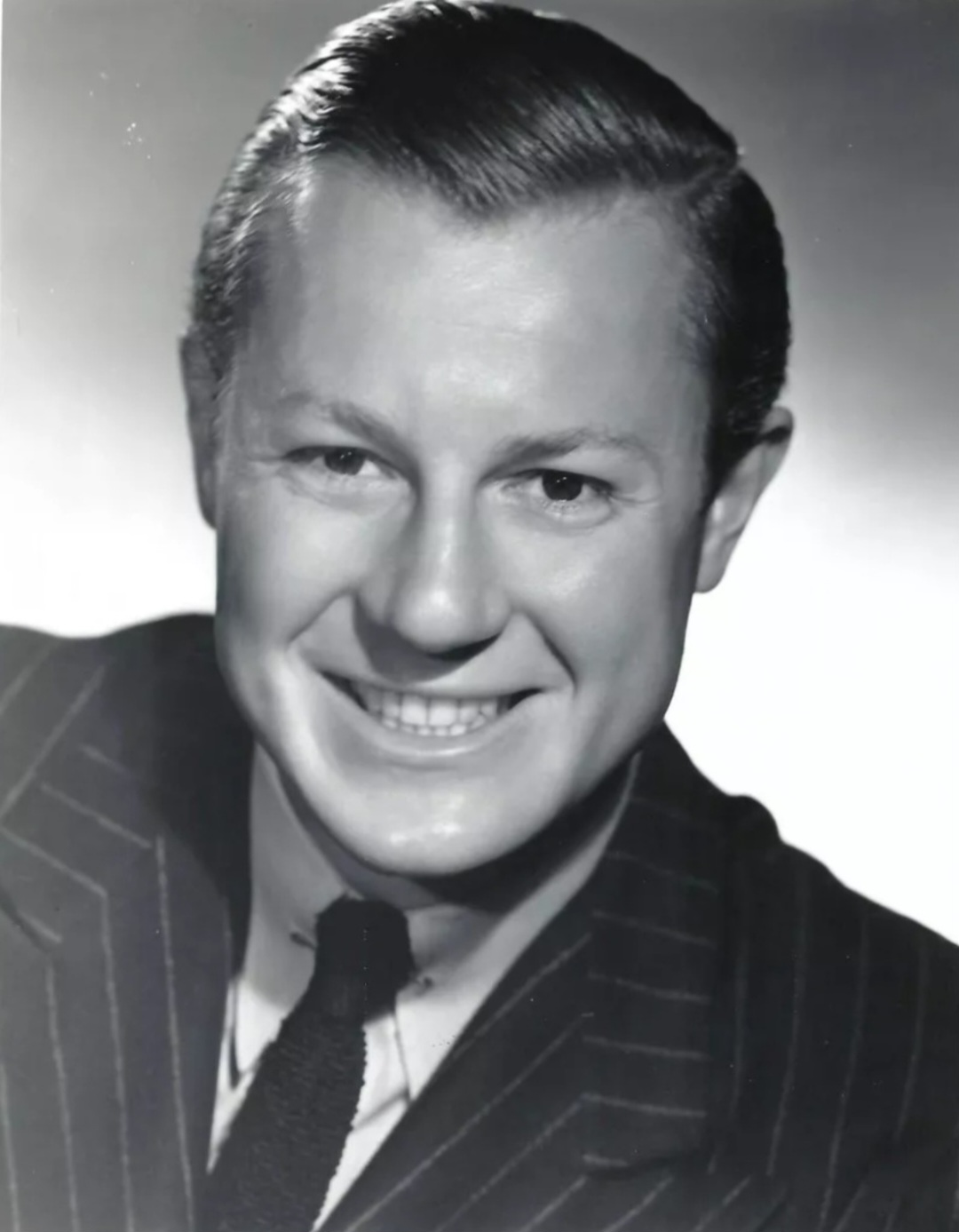
- Derr c. 1940s
- Born: June 15, 1917; Norristown, Pennsylvania, U.S.
- Died: May 8, 1992 (aged 74); Santa Monica, California, U.S.
- Occupation: Actor
- Years active: 1941–1983

Richard Derr (June 15, 1917 – May 8, 1992) was an American actor who worked with stage, movie, and television drama, performing in both supporting and main roles.

== Early years ==
Born in Norristown, Pennsylvania, Derr graduated from Norristown High School in 1933. While he worked as a bank clerk, he acted with a little theater group in Norristown.

Derr served in the Army Transport Service for three years during World War II.

== Acting career ==
Derr was a life member of the Actors Studio. He had several main roles in stage dramas. In 1955, he sang in the main role for the Broadway musical Plain and Fancy. His other Broadway credits include Dial M for Murder (1952), Invitation to a March (1960), Maybe Tuesday (1957), A Phoenix Too Frequent (1949), and The Closing Door (1949).

In movies, Derr was primarily a character actor. However, he had the main role in George Pal's 1951 science fiction movie from Paramount Pictures, When Worlds Collide. Derr later had the main role in The Invisible Avenger (1958), a movie based on the radio show and pulp magazine character The Shadow. The character also served as the basis for two television pilot episodes, neither of which was developed into a series.

During the 1950s, most of Derr's work was in television. On November 21, 1950, he co-featured in "The Perfect Type" on Armstrong Circle Theatre. In 1959, he was the host of Fanfare, a summer dramatic anthology series by NBC-TV. In 1965, he played the role of Dr. Dwyer in the three-part serial "The Adventures of Gallegher" for Walt Disney's Wonderful World of Color, and later made appearances in Barnaby Jones, in two episodes of Star Trek, and in the 1976 miniseries Rich Man, Poor Man Book II.

== Real estate ==
Derr had a license as a real estate broker. He was an associate of the Beverly Hills Realty Company and a member of the Beverly Hills Realty Board.

== Death ==
On May 8, 1992, at the age of 75, Derr died of pancreatic cancer in Santa Monica, California.

== Partial filmography ==
- Charlie Chan in Rio (1941) as Ken Reynolds
- Man at Large (1941) as Max, posing as Colonel Von Rohn
- A Gentleman at Heart (1942) as Stewart Haines
- Sex Hygiene (1942 short) as Soldier
- Castle in the Desert (1942) as Carl Detheridge
- The Man Who Wouldn't Die (1942) as Roger Blake
- Ten Gentlemen from West Point (1942) as Chester
- Just Off Broadway (1942) as John Logan
- Commandos Strike at Dawn (1942) as Gunnar Korstad
- Tonight We Raid Calais (1943) as German Captain (uncredited)
- Cry "Havoc" (1943) as Marine with Thermometer (uncredited)
- An American Romance (1944) in an undetermined role (uncredited)
- The Secret Heart (1946) as Larry Addams
- The Bride Goes Wild (1948) as Bruce Kope Johnson
- Luxury Liner (1948) as Charles G.K. Worton
- Joan of Arc (1948) as Jean de Metz (a knight)
- Guilty of Treason (1950) as Soviet Col. Aleksandr Melnikov
- When Worlds Collide (1951) as David Randall
- Something to Live For (1952) as Tony Collins
- Invisible Avenger (1958) as Lamont Cranston
- Terror Is a Man (1959) as William Fitzgerald
- An American Dream (1966) as Jack Hale (uncredited)
- Rosie! (1967) as Lawyer
- Three in the Attic (1968) as Mr. Clinton
- Topaz (1969) as U.S. Embassy Official in Copenhagen (uncredited)
- Adam at 6 A.M. (1970) as Mr. Gaines
- The Morning After (1974) as Dr. Tillman
- The Drowning Pool (1975) as James Devereaux
- SST: Death Flight (1977) as Governor Stensky
- American Gigolo (1980) as Mr. Williams
- Firefox (1982) as Admiral Curtin

== Television ==
Year	Title	Role	Notes
1969	Star Trek: The Original Series	Admiral Fitzgerald	S3:E16, "Mark of Gideon"
