= The People's Choice (TV series) =

1950s American sitcom

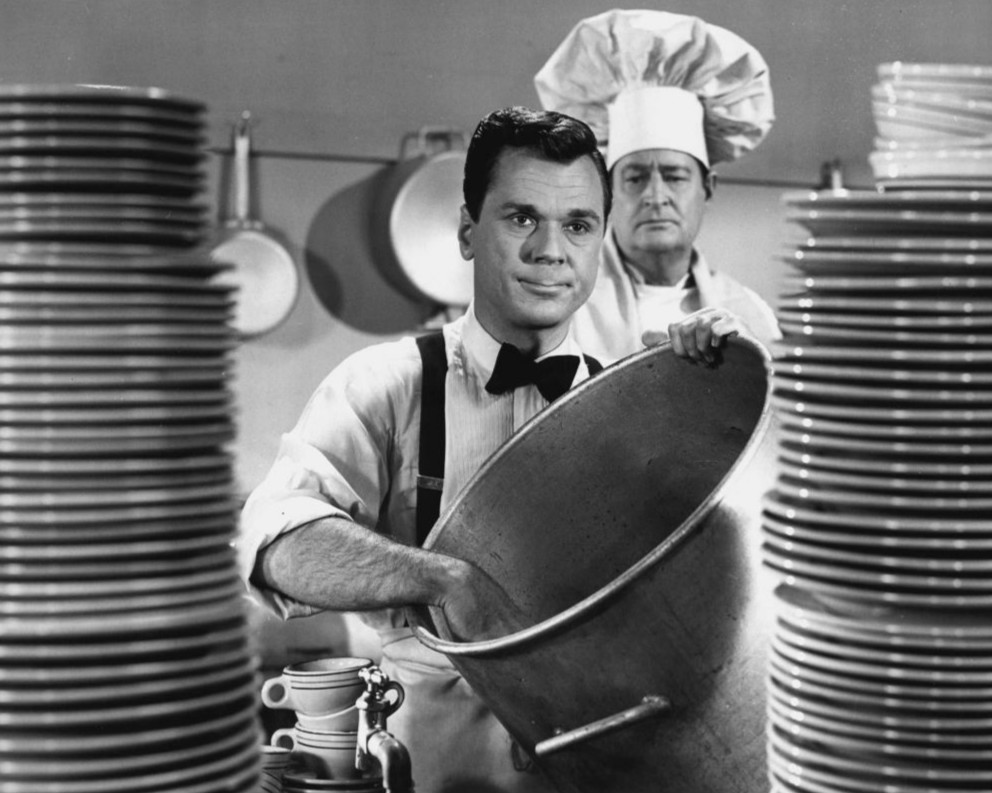
- Jackie Cooper as Socrates "Sock" Miller (1955)
- Genre: Sitcom
- Created by: Irving Brecher
- Starring: Jackie Cooper; Patricia Breslin; Paul Maxey; Margaret Irving; Dick Wesson; Mary Jane Croft (voice)
- Country of origin: United States
- Original language: English
- No. of seasons: 3
- No. of episodes: 104

Production
- Camera setup: Multi-camera
- Running time: 24–26 minutes
- Production company: Norden Productions

Original release
- Network: NBC
- Release: October 6, 1955 – September 25, 1958

The People's Choice is an American television sitcom that aired on NBC from 1955 to 1958. It was primarily sponsored by the Borden Company. Production of the series was overseen by George Burns' company, McCadden Productions.

It stars Jackie Cooper as Socrates "Sock" Miller, who is a former Marine Korean War veteran and a young politician living in fictitious New City, California. Sock has a Basset Hound named "Cleo", whose thoughts (voiced by Mary Jane Croft), baleful observations of Sock's dilemmas, are recorded on the soundtrack for the viewers' amusement. The real name of the dog that played Cleo was "Bernadette". Much of Cleo's dialog consists of wisecracks. The popularity of the basset hound breed increased markedly with the run of the show.

== Overview ==
In the first season, Sock is an ornithologist and a city council member, who is living in a trailer park with his maiden Aunt "Gus" Bennett, short for Augusta (Margaret Irving) who had raised Sock after his parents' death when Sock was three years of age. Sock is dating Amanda "Mandy" Peoples (Patricia Breslin), the daughter of the mayor (Paul Maxey), who does not entirely approve of the relationship, but he gradually warms to Sock.

Later, Sock takes courses (though he is not in law school) to pass the California bar exam to become an attorney, so he can then afford to marry Mandy. In the first-season finale, Sock suddenly proposes to Mandy and wants to elope. He is afraid the mayor will want to stage a big wedding, and they will not be able to get married for many months. The couple drives to Nevada for a quickie wedding, intending to return in time for Sock to take his bar exam. On the way back, they are arrested for a traffic violation and must spend the night in jail. This causes Sock to miss the bar exam. Sock wants to be independent of his father-in-law, so the couple agrees to keep their marriage a secret from the mayor until Sock gets his law license.

Most episodes in the second season are about Sock and Mandy trying to be together (as much as this could be depicted in the 1950s), while keeping the mayor from finding out that they are married. At some point during the season, Aunt Gus and the mayor get married, and she learns that Sock and Mandy are married and agrees to keep their secret from the mayor. By the end of the season, Sock has passed the bar, and their marriage is out in the open. Sock's scheming Marine buddy, Rollo "the Hex" Hexley (Dick Wesson), moved in with Sock during the second season and appeared in 27 episodes and the original 1955 pilot.

In the third season, Sock manages a residential real-estate development called Barkerville Estates. They still return to New City often enough for Mayor Peoples and Aunt Gus to appear regularly.

== Guest stars ==
- Nick Adams
- Jack Albertson
- Lola Albright
- Eleanor Audley
- Jacqueline Beer
- James Best
- Mel Blanc
- Shirley Bonne
- Joe E. Brown
- George Chandler
- Harry Cheshire
- Andy Clyde
- Joe Conley
- Mike Connors
- Jackie Coogan
- Ellen Corby
- Richard Deacon
- Angie Dickinson
- King Donovan
- John Doucette
- Ross Elliott
- Michael Emmet
- Yvonne Lime Fedderson
- Frank Ferguson
- James Flavin
- Ned Glass
- Charles Lane
- Joi Lansing
- Nan Leslie
- Forrest Lewis
- Howard McNear
- Jay Novello
- Louis Quinn
- Addison Richards
- Hal J. Smith
- Doris Singleton
- Olive Sturgess
- Ann Tyrrell
- Florenz Ames
- Herb Vigran
- Gregory Walcott as Stone Kenyon
- Frank Wilcox

== Production notes ==
The series was created and co-produced by Irving Brecher, who was also the creator of the 1949 sitcom, The Life of Riley. Although The People's Choice never made the top 30 programs, its ratings were respectable enough to warrant a place on NBC for three seasons. The show later became quite popular in syndication enjoying continuous daytime repeat broadcasts for more than a decade in several local markets following its original network run.

During its first year, The People's Choice aired opposite Stop the Music as that long-running ABC series was concluding its final season.

== Spin-off ==
From The People's Choice, Cleo the talking dog spawned the idea of a talking baby in the 1960–1961 NBC sitcom, Happy starring Ronnie Burns and Yvonne Lime Fedderson, who had also guest starred on The People's Choice.

In Spanish the show was known as Cleo y yo.
