= Court Martial (Star Trek: The Original Series) =

- Star Trek: The Original Series episode
- Episode no.: Season 1 Episode 20
- Directed by: Marc Daniels
- Story by: Don M. Mankiewicz; Steven W. Carabatsos
- Teleplay by: Don M. Mankiewicz
- Cinematography by: Jerry Finnerman
- Production code: 015
- Original air date: February 2, 1967

Guest appearances
- Elisha Cook Jr. – Samuel T. Cogley, Esq.; Percy Rodriguez – Commodore Stone; Joan Marshall – Lt. Areel Shaw; Richard Webb – Lt. Cdr. Ben Finney; Hagan Beggs – Helmsman; Winston DeLugo – Timothy; Alice Rawlings – Jame Finney; Nancy Wong – Personnel Officer; Bart Conrad – Capt. Krasnovsky; William Meader – Capt. Lindstrom; Reginald Lal Singh – Capt. Nensi Chandra

Episode chronology
← Previous "Tomorrow Is Yesterday"	Next → "The Return of the Archons"
- Star Trek: The Original Series season 1

"Court Martial" is the twentieth episode of the first season of the American science fiction television series Star Trek. It was written by Don M. Mankiewicz and Steven W. Carabatsos, directed by Marc Daniels, and first aired on February 2, 1967.

In the episode, Captain Kirk stands trial on charges of criminal negligence after jettisoning an occupied research pod during an emergency.

== Plot ==
The USS Enterprise is at Starbase 11 for repairs after an ion storm. During the storm, Captain James T. Kirk was forced to eject a research pod containing Lieutenant Commander Benjamin Finney to prevent the destruction of the ship. A search party was unable to find Finney. Commodore Stone, commander of the base, reviews the ship's records and discovers that Kirk ejected the pod while the ship was at Yellow Alert and not Red Alert as Kirk claimed. Stone accuses Kirk of perjury and warns him that he may be subject to court martial.

Stone first interviews Kirk privately, asking about his history with Finney. Kirk had served with Finney aboard the USS Republic and reported a mistake Finney had made, causing Finney to be reprimanded and sent to the bottom of the promotion list. Ever since, Finney has blamed Kirk for hindering his advancement. Stone asks Kirk to voluntarily step down as captain of the Enterprise, but Kirk disputes the allegations and demands a trial.

At the trial, both Spock and Dr. McCoy defend Kirk's character, but testify to the facts that Kirk had reason to resent Finney and that it is impossible for the ship's computer log to be wrong. Finney's daughter Jame looks on. Samuel T. Cogley, Kirk's attorney, puts him on the stand, but again, Kirk's testimony contradicts the computer logs, which include a visual recording that shows Kirk ejecting the pod while the ship was on Yellow Alert. During a recess, Kirk tells Spock that he might be able to beat his next captain at chess, giving Spock an idea.

Mr. Spock discovers that he is able to beat the Enterprise computer several times at three dimensional chess, despite having given the computer all his knowledge of the game. He concludes that the computer has been tampered with as his best outcome should have been a draw. Spock arrives with his findings before the court-martial verdict can be handed down, and Cogley makes an impassioned speech on the rights of man versus the machine, demanding that the court reconvene aboard the Enterprise. Once there, Spock notes only three people could have altered the computer records aboard the Enterprise: Kirk, himself, and Finney. Cogley suggests that Finney is not dead.

After most of the crew is beamed down to Starbase 11, Dr. McCoy uses a sensitive auditory device tied into the computer that can detect a human heartbeat aboard the ship, and masks out those of all known to remain aboard. One heartbeat remains, coming from Engineering. Kirk goes there to find Finney, who draws a phaser and informs him that he has sabotaged the ship so she will drop out of orbit, killing everyone aboard. Kirk reveals that Finney's daughter Jame is also aboard, confusing him and giving Kirk time to wrestle the weapon away and knock out Finney. After Finney is secured, Kirk repairs enough of the damage to allow the Enterprise to regain a stable orbit.

Captain Kirk is cleared of all charges and restored to duty. As a footnote, Lt. Areel Shaw, the Starfleet JAG who had been the prosecutor at the court martial, mentions that Sam Cogley will be defending Ben Finney at his court martial for his actions against Kirk.

== Production ==
The script was originally entitled "Court Martial on Star Base 11." Star Trek commentator Keith DeCandido, writing for Tor.com, observed, "This episode was originally commissioned by producer Gene L. Coon as a cheap single-set episode, and Don M. Mankiewicz gave him a court martial story, intending it to take place entirely in the courtroom. However, the final version of the script required several new sets to be built, not to mention a matte painting of Starbase 11." For the final version four new sets were built: Kirk's quarters on the starbase, Commodore Stone's office, the starbase bar, and the courtroom itself.

Actor Richard Webb plays the character of Lt. Cdr. Ben Finney, the officer Kirk is charged with killing. Despite the character being referred to throughout the episode as ‘Lt. Commander’, the insignia on the uniform he wears is of a full commander.

Elisha Cook Jr. had difficulty memorizing his long dramatic appeals to the court. Many of his speeches in the script are not present in the aired version, and some of those that were filmed frequently cut away from him to court and spectator reactions.

This is the first episode to refer to the organization the main characters are part of as Starfleet and the top of the hierarchy being Starfleet Command. It is also the first appearance of a starbase in the series. Previously, the name of the Enterprise's service had varied, such as in "The Conscience of the King", where it was referred to as "the Star Service."

== Reception ==
Zack Handlen of The A.V. Club gave the episode a "B−" rating, stating that the potential of holding Kirk to high standards in the story is lessened as his "fallibility is never really the issue".

DeCandido found many of the episode's actions to be procedurally incorrect.

Reviewer Darren Mooney had mixed feelings about "Court Martial" as the first episode in the Star Trek universe to serve up a courtroom story: "While its influence is absolutely massive, Court Martial is still a problematic episode." Among its flaws, Mooney wrote, is the "mess" of a script which had to be rewritten.

Michelle Erica Green wrote that the episode "won't win any Emmys for legal drama, but it holds up quite well."

Io9's 2014 listing of the top 100 Star Trek episodes placed "Court Martial" as the 89th best episode of all series up to that time, out of over 700 episodes.

In 2019, Nerdist included this episode on their "Best of Kirk" binge-watching guide.
