= Homicidal =

1961 film by William Castle

- Original film poster
- Directed by: William Castle
- Written by: Robb White
- Produced by: William Castle
- Starring: Jean Arless; Glenn Corbett; Patricia Breslin; Eugenie Leontovich; Alan Bunce; James Westerfield
- Cinematography: Burnett Guffey
- Edited by: Edwin H. Bryant
- Music by: Hugo Friedhofer
- Color process: Black and white
- Production company: William Castle Productions
- Distributed by: Columbia Pictures
- Release date: June 28, 1961
- Running time: 87 minutes
- Country: United States
- Language: English
- Box office: $1.6 million

Homicidal is a 1961 American horror-thriller film produced and directed by William Castle, and starring Glenn Corbett, Patricia Breslin, Eugenie Leontovich, Alan Bunce and Jean Arless. The film follows a murderous woman in a small California town whose presence unearths secrets concerning a prominent local family.

Like many of Castle's films, the film was released with a promotional gimmick—in this case, a "fright break," that allowed patrons to receive a refund if they were too scared to stay for the climax of the film. While a few reviews upon its release were mixed, it has since gained a cult following and is considered one of Castle's best films.

== Plot ==
A mysterious woman calling herself Miriam Webster offers Jim, a bellboy at a hotel in Ventura, California, two thousand dollars to marry her that night. The two arrive at the home of Alfred Adrims, a local justice of the peace and, after a rushed ceremony, the woman savagely stabs Adrims to death and flees. Arriving home, she gloats about the murder to mute, elderly wheelchair-bound Helga.

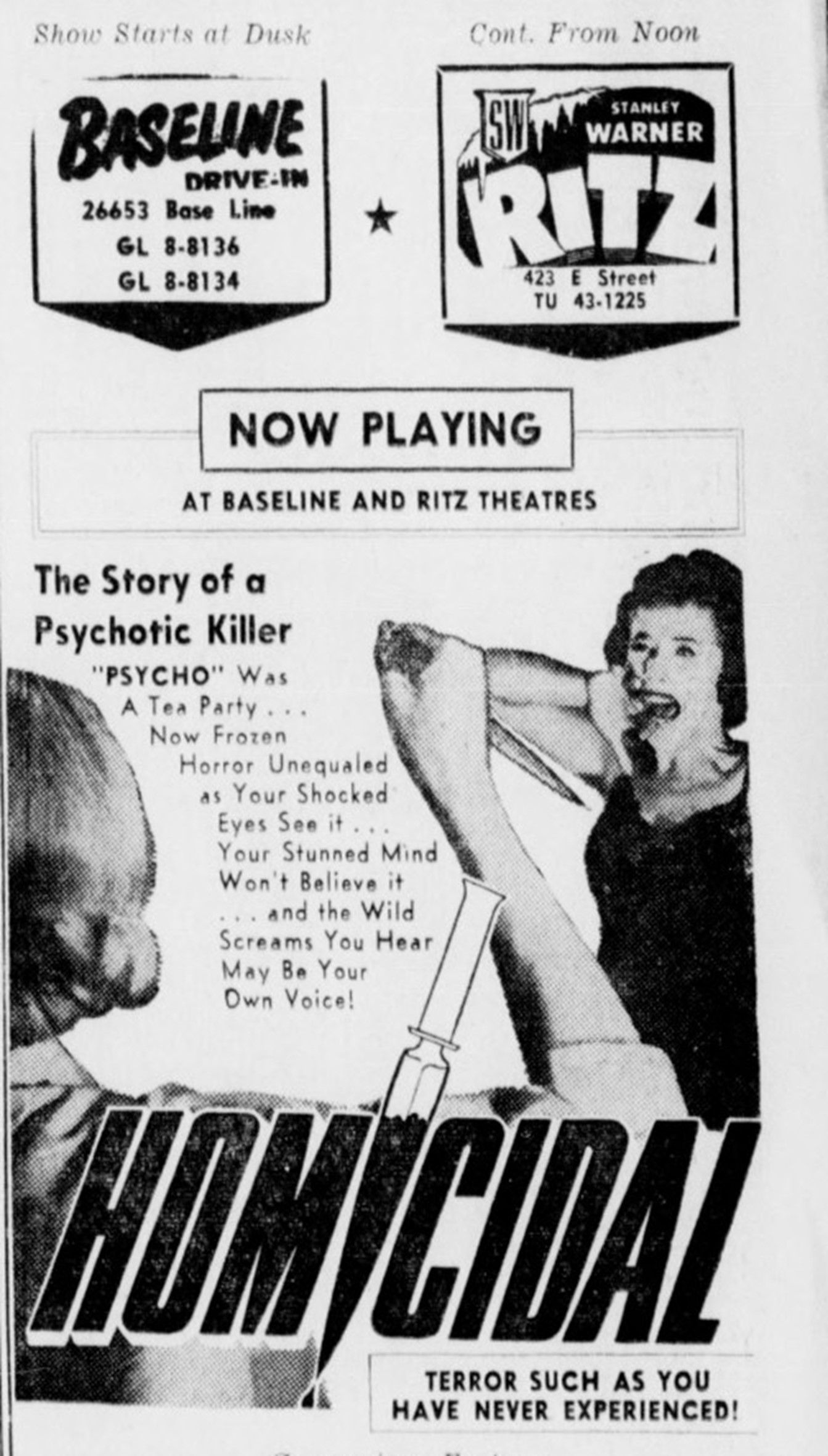
Advertisement from 1961

The next morning, Helga and the woman, now going by the name Emily, are visited by the real Miriam Webster, a local flower shop owner. It is revealed that Emily and Helga were brought over from Denmark by Miriam's half-brother Warren, who was raised there by Helga after their parents died until Helga had a stroke. Emily convinces Miriam to take care of Helga while she visits a drugstore run by Karl, Miriam's boyfriend. Afterwards, Emily breaks into Miriam's flower shop and wrecks it after getting upset at the wedding decorations on display.

Noticing the break-in, Karl enters the flower shop but is knocked unconscious by Emily. He is woken by Warren, who also shows him a newspaper police sketch of Adrims's murderer, who resembles Emily. Karl convinces Warren to let Miriam sleep at his house. At the house, Warren and Miriam talk about their traumatic childhood. Their father insisted on having a son and left Miriam's mother after she was born, marrying Warren's mother. He was obsessed with making Warren a strong man, including through corporal punishment, and was helped in this by Helga. It is also revealed that Warren will soon inherit 10 million dollars as his father's sole designated heir. That night, Miriam is woken up by Emily standing silently in her room.

The next morning, Emily denies having been in Miriam's room and claims she and Warren are married. Miriam is incredulous, but leaves after Emily threatens to kill her. While at her flower shop, Miriam is visited by Lieutenant Miller regarding Adrims's murder, but he is convinced of Miriam's innocence after receiving confirmation from Jim. Karl and Miriam grow suspicious of Emily and obtain a photograph of her from Warren, who remains convinced of Emily's innocence. Later that day, after having her knife sharpened and being briefly interrupted by a visit from local Doctor Jonas, Emily murders Helga for her cruel treatment of Warren when he was a boy.

Miriam receives a phone call from Karl that Jim has identified Emily as Adrims's killer. Miriam leaves with Warren to try and save Helga, unaware she is already dead. After being left in the car by Warren, Miriam enters the house and witnesses Helga's severed head falling down the stairlift. Miriam is attacked by Emily and calls Warren for help. Emily replies in Warren's voice, removes her wig and puts in prosthetic teeth, revealing herself to be Warren. Warren then tries to kill Miriam, but is distracted when Lieutenant Miller arrives. Warren tries to attack Miller, but is shot dead by Miriam.

Lieutenant Miller and Doctor Jonas reveal the truth to Miriam and Karl: "Warren" was born a girl, but forcibly raised as a boy by his mother and Helga so he could inherit his father's fortune. The secret of the child's gender was known only to the mother, nurse Helga (who delivered the baby), and county clerk (later justice of the peace) Adrims, who was bribed to falsify the birth record. Warren later created the identity of "Emily" to get rid of Adrims, Helga and Miriam, to ensure he would obtain the fortune. With Warren/Emily dead, Miriam is now her father's sole heir, which Karl jokes makes him love her even more.

== Cast ==
- Glenn Corbett as Karl
- Patricia Breslin as Miriam Webster
- Joan Marshall as Emily and Warren (credited as Jean Arless)
- Eugenie Leontovich as Helga
- Alan Bunce as Dr. Jonas
- Richard Rust as Jim Nesbitt
- James Westerfield as Mr. Adrims
- Gilbert Green as Lieutenant Miller
- Wolfe Barzell as Olie
- Hope Summers as Mrs. Adrims
- Teri Brooks as Mrs. Forest
- Ralph Moody as first clerk
- Joe Forte as second clerk

== Production ==
=== Conception ===
After fifteen years directing a string of B movies for Columbia, Universal, and Monogram, William Castle mortgaged his house and formed William Castle Productions in 1958. His first release, Macabre, was a modest thriller. To draw attention to the film, he offered every audience member a $1,000 life insurance policy from Lloyd's of London against death by fright during the film. Castle promoted the film with TV commercials and previews that focused more on the life insurance policy than the film. The public bought it and the film was a financial, if not critical, success. William Castle added a gimmick to most of his films over the next ten years.

=== Casting ===
Actress Joan Marshall was cast in the dual role of Emily/Warren, credited under the stage name Jean Arless. This led some publications to erroneously assume the part was her first credit. Originally, Castle had intended to cast two different actors for the roles of Emily and Warren. After auditioning for the role of Emily, Marshall returned to visit Castle at his office dressed as a man to audition for the part of Warren: "My secretary, not recognizing her, asked the man his name," Castle recalled. "The transformation was indeed astonishing." Marshall's effective auditions for both parts convinced Castle to cast her in the dual role.

=== Filming ===
Principal photography for Homicidal began on November 1, 1960, in Ventura and Solvang, California. For her scenes playing Warren, star Marshall had her hair cut like a man's and dyed brown, wore brown contact lenses and had prosthetic appliances made to alter the shape of her nose, mouth and hands.

== Release ==
Homicidal was released theatrically in the United States on June 28, 1961. It received a theatrical run in New York City beginning on July 26, 1962.

=== The "Fright Break" ===
Based on the success of Castle's previous films, Columbia Pictures agreed to implement his concept for a "Fright Break." This entails a 45-second timer which overlays the film's climax as the heroine approached the house harboring a sadistic killer. A voice-over advised the audience of the time remaining in which they could leave the theater and receive a full refund if they were too frightened to see the remainder of the film. To ensure the more wily patrons did not simply stay for a second showing and leave during the finale, Castle had both numbered and different colored tickets printed for each show. About 1% of patrons still demanded refunds, and in response Castle decided to spotlight the people who chose to leave by creating a "Coward's Corner." Print ads promoting the film emphasized this "Fright Break" gimmick.

Fright Certificate

The "Coward's Corner" was a table with a nurse holding a blood pressure cuff. John Waters described it in his book Crackpot.

He came up with "Coward's Corner," a yellow cardboard booth, manned by a bewildered theater employee in the lobby. When the Fright Break was announced, and you found that you couldn't take it any more, you had to leave your seat and, in front of the entire audience, follow yellow footsteps up the aisle, bathed in a yellow light. Before you reached Coward's Corner, you crossed yellow lines with the stencilled message: "Cowards Keep Walking." You passed a nurse (in a yellow uniform? ... I wonder), who would offer a blood-pressure test. All the while a recording was blaring, "Watch the chicken! Watch him shiver in Coward's Corner!" As the audience howled, you had to go through one final indignity – at Coward's Corner you were forced to sign a yellow card stating, "I am a bona fide coward." Very, very few were masochistic enough to endure this. The one percent refund dribbled away to a zero percent, and I'm sure that in many cities a plant had to be paid to go through this torture. No wonder theater owners balked at booking a William Castle film. It was all just too complicated.

According to Castle, the gimmick worked "great," and that theaters earned an average of $20,000 weekly in box office sales, with only $100 in refunds.

=== Critical response ===
==== Contemporaneous ====
Multiple critics drew comparisons between Homicidal and Alfred Hitchcock's Psycho, released the year prior. Time magazine said: "Made in imitation of Hitchcock's Psycho, it surpasses its model in structure, suspense and sheer nervous drive." and placed it on its list of top ten films of the year for 1962. Other critics were not so kind. The New York Times said "Near the end of Homicidal, yesterday's horror entry at neighborhood theaters, the disembodied voice of William Castle, the producer-director, announces a 'fright break', during which the economy-minded viewers may return their tickets for a refund ... If the reprieve had come before the opening of this dismal imitation of Psycho and Mickey Spillane, it would have been a better idea." New York Herald Tribune wrote that "Castle's shock effects are not so much of the weird or 'horror' as of the gruesome or blood-on-the-cummerbund variety."

==== Retrospective ====
Though many critics were dismissive of Homicidal upon its release, the film has since garnered a cult following, and is regarded as one of Castle's best films. In The Psychotronic Video Guide (1996), Michael Weldon referred to the film as an "incredible experience," and it has also been championed by filmmaker John Waters. Film scholar David Hogan wrote: "In a psychosexual sense, Homicidal was perhaps the most distressing Hollywood film until William Friedkin's numbing and misunderstood Cruising (1980)." Hogan also cited it as Castle's best film despite being his "most derivative." Douglas Brode echoed similar sentiments, remarking the film's "marvelous" pacing and sustainment of suspense. However, Glenn Erickson from DVD Savant wrote that the film was "a perfectly wretched movie, bad enough to make Castle's other hits seem like flukes".

=== Home media ===
Homicidal was released on DVD in North America by Columbia Pictures Home Entertainment in 2002. It was made available again on DVD pressed on-demand by Sony Choice Collection on September 3, 2013. On July 19, 2016, Mill Creek Entertainment released the film on Blu-ray as a double feature alongside Castle's Mr. Sardonicus. In 2021 Powerhouse/Indicator Films released a high definition remaster Blu-ray, accompanied by special features.

== See also ==
- List of American films of 1961
- Sleepaway Camp, another horror film with uncommon depictions of gender presentation
- List of horror films featuring transgender serial killers

== Works cited ==
- Brode, Douglas (2003). Edge of Your Seat: The 100 Greatest Movie Thrillers. New York: Citadel Press. ISBN 978-0-806-52382-8. OCLC 52947955.
- Hogan, David J. (1997). Dark Romance: Sexuality in the Horror Film. Jefferson, North Carolina: McFarland. ISBN 978-0-786-40474-2. OCLC 982679867.
- Law, John W. (2000). Scare Tactic: The Life & Films of William Castle. San Jose [Calif.]: Writers Club Press. ISBN 0595095445. OCLC 60884288.
- McCarty, John (1986). Psychos: Eighty Years of Mad Movies, Maniacs, and Murderous Deeds (1st ed.). New York: St. Martin's Press. ISBN 0-31265-341-7. OCLC 12695097.
- Waters, John (2003). Crackpot: The Obsessions of John Waters (1st Scribner trade pbk. ed.). New York: Scribner. ISBN 978-0-743-24627-9. OCLC 52539711.
