= Inman Jackson =

American basketball player (1907–1973)

Personal information
- Born: March 7, 1907 Chicago, Illinois, U.S.
- Died: April 6, 1973 (aged 66) Chicago, Illinois, U.S.
- Listed height: 6 ft 3 in (1.91 m)
- Listed weight: 205 lb (93 kg)

Career information
- High school: Wendell Phillips (Chicago, Illinois)
- College: CCNY
- Playing career: 1925–1945
- Position: Center

Career history
- 1925–1927: Chicago Giles American Legion Post
- 1926–1930: Savoy Big Five
- 1930–1945: Harlem Globetrotters
- Basketball Hall of Fame

Inman William "Big Jack" Jackson (March 7, 1907 – April 6, 1973) was an American professional basketball player. He was a long-time member of the Harlem Globetrotters and was inducted into the Naismith Memorial Basketball Hall of Fame in 2022.

== Early life ==
Jackson was born on March 7, 1907, and grew up in Chicago, Illinois. He attended Wendell Phillips Academy High School in Chicago and later attended the City College of New York.

== Playing career ==
Jackson said that he began playing basketball "in grammar school" and "played quite a lot" growing up. He was a top player for Wendell Phillips Academy High School and also played in his freshman season at the City College of New York, although he dropped out before his second year.

A 6 feet 3 inches (1.91 m), 205 pounds (93 kg) center, Jackson played independent basketball starting in 1925 with the Chicago Giles American Legion Post team. Midway through his second season there, he joined the Chicago Savoy Big Five, a predecessor to the Harlem Globetrotters. He played through 1930 with the Big Five before signing with the Globetrotters. He was described as "a late bloomer, but by the time he signed with the Trotters, he was strong, fundamentally-sound, and intimidating."

Jackson was a top player for the Globetrotters, being noted by Jet magazine as "basketball's first outstanding 'big man'". He was renowned for his handling abilities, being described by The Montana Standard as "one of the greatest ball handlers in the nation today" and by The Minneapolis Journal as playing "as though he were born with a basketball in each hand". He was also known as having introduced comedy and showmanship to the Globetrotters, previously a regular team: team founder Abe Saperstein named Jackson the most important Globetrotter of all time and Charley Eckman credited him with having been "the guy who transformed the Trotters from a bunch traveling around playing basketball like everybody else to the great show they are." The Naismith Memorial Basketball Hall of Fame noted that Jackson was the first "clown prince" of the Globetrotters and that, "[o]n any given night, he would roll the ball through an unsuspecting defender's legs, dropkick a shot from the free throw line, or lift a teammate onto his shoulders for the final basketball before the horn sounded."

One of the team's best stars and among the most popular players for the Globetrotters, Jackson ultimately played for them for 15 years – from 1930 to 1945. He was the team captain for much of his tenure with Harlem and helped them win the second World Professional Basketball Tournament in 1940, towards the end of his career. He retired from playing in 1945.

== Later career and death ==
Jackson stayed in the Globetrotters organization following his playing career until his death. He served as a consultant coach, instructor of new talent, assistant coach, and was named the head coach in 1966. He received four percent of Abe Saperstein's estate at the latter's death in 1966, the only member of the team in Saperstein's will.

Jackson married Loretta Sandridge, and had two stepchildren. He died in Chicago on April 6, 1973, at the age of 66. He was inducted into the Basketball Museum of Illinois Hall of Fame in 1974 and was posthumously selected to the Naismith Memorial Basketball Hall of Fame in 2022.
