= The Frank Sinatra Show =

The Frank Sinatra Show may refer to these broadcasts starring Frank Sinatra:

- The Frank Sinatra Show (1950 TV series)
- The Frank Sinatra Show (1957 TV series)
- The Frank Sinatra Show (radio program), several radio musical programs in the U.S.
- Bing Crosy and Dean Martin Present: The Frank Sinatra Timex Show, a 1959 TV special
- The Frank Sinatra Timex Show: An Afternoon With Frank Sinatra, a 1959 TV special
- The Frank Sinatra Timex Show: Here's to the Ladies, a 1960 TV special
- The Frank Sinatra Timex Show: Welcome Home Elvis, a 1960 TV special

== See also ==
- Frank Sinatra#Television and radio career
