= G.I. Blues =

1960 Elvis Presley film by Norman Taurog, Hal B. Wallis

- Theatrical release poster
- Directed by: Norman Taurog
- Written by: Edmund Beloin; Henry Garson
- Produced by: Hal B. Wallis
- Starring: Elvis Presley; Juliet Prowse
- Cinematography: Loyal Griggs
- Edited by: Warren Low
- Music by: Joseph J. Lilley
- Production company: Hal Wallis Productions
- Distributed by: Paramount Pictures
- Release date: November 4, 1960 (New York)
- Running time: 104 minutes
- Country: United States
- Language: English
- Box office: $4.3 million (US/ Canada rentals)

G.I. Blues is a 1960 American musical comedy film directed by Norman Taurog and starring Elvis Presley and Juliet Prowse. The movie – Presley's fifth, but his first after discharge from the US Army – was filmed at Paramount Pictures studio, with some pre-production scenery shot on location in West Germany while Presley was stationed there. The movie won a second-place Laurel Award in the category of Top Musical of 1960.

== Plot ==
U.S. Army Specialist Tulsa MacLean is a tank crewman with a singing career. Serving with the 3rd Armored Division in West Germany, MacLean dreams of running his own nightclub when he leaves the army, but such dreams don't come cheap. Tulsa and his buddies have formed a band and perform in various German "Gasthauses", night clubs, and on an Armed Forces stage. In one bar, he even discovers the record "Blue Suede Shoes" on a jukebox – sung by some guy named Elvis Presley.

To raise money, Tulsa places a bet that his tank commander, Dynamite, can spend the night with a club dancer named Lili, who is rumoured to be hard to get since she turned down another soldier, Turk. Dynamite and Turk have vied for women before when the two were stationed in Hawaii. When Dynamite gets transferred to Alaska, Tulsa is brought in to take his place in the bet. He is not looking forward to it, but must go through with it.

Tulsa uses his Southern charm and calls Lili "ma'am." She at first sees Tulsa as another Occupation Duty GI. Then after a day on the Rhine, Lili begins to fall for him. Tulsa's friend Cookie, meanwhile, falls in love with Lili's roommate, Tina from Italy. In the end, Rick's and Marla's baby son Tiger helps Tulsa win the bet for the outfit – and Lili's heart.

== Cast ==
- Elvis Presley as Spec. 5 Tulsa MacLean
- Juliet Prowse as Lili
- Robert Ivers as PFC Cookie
- James Douglas as Rick
- Letícia Román as Tina
- Sigrid Maier as Marla
- Arch Johnson as MSG McGraw
- Mickey Knox as Jeeter
- John Hudson as CPT Hobart
- Ken Becker as Mac
- Jeremy Slate as Turk
- Beach Dickerson as Warren
- Trent Dolan as Mickey
- Carl Crow as Walt
- Fred Essler as Papa Mueller
- Ron Starr as Harvey
- Erika Peters as Trudy
- Ludwig Stössel as puppet show owner

In addition, in uncredited roles, Edson Stroll appears as Dynamite, while Presley's real bandmates, Scotty Moore and D. J. Fontana, and his regular backup singers, The Jordanaires, perform onscreen in those same roles.

== Background ==
Elvis Presley's Army career began in 1958, and by 1960 it had been two years since Presley had made his last film, King Creole. Despite his previous three films being mostly slammed by the critics, they warmed to King Creole and its star. Presley felt confident that he had a future in acting after this praise and he was looking forward to returning to Hollywood after his time in the army.

The script was written by Edmund Beloin and Henry Garson, who had done the final revisions for Hal Wallis on Don't Give Up the Ship. In 1958 they came up with an original treatment for an Elvis Presley movie called Christmas in Berlin. It was later known as Cafe Europa before becoming GI Blues.

Eight months prior to Presley being discharged, in August 1959, producer Hal Wallis visited with him in West Germany to go over the script for G.I. Blues and film some on-location scenes. Although some scenes were used in the final film, Presley did not film at any time during his time there. Elvis' double, Private First Class Tom Creel, was used for some shots.

The U.S. Army supplied tanks and vehicles on manoeuvres to be used in the filming, and appointed public information officer John J. Mawn as technical advisor for the film. Mawn had presided over Presley's military press conferences.

Presley returned to the U.S. in March 1960 and began work on the film in late April.

Hal Wallis originally wanted Michael Curtiz to direct but eventually selected Norman Taurog. Dolores Hart, Joan Blackman and Ursula Andress were all tested to play the female lead before deciding on Juliet Prowse.

== Reception and box office ==
The film received mixed reviews from critics. Bosley Crowther of The New York Times was noncommittal, mostly remarking on Presley's new clean-cut image: "Gone is that rock 'n' roll wriggle, that ludicrously lecherous leer, that precocious country-bumpkin image, that unruly mop of oily hair ... Elvis is now a fellow you can almost stand." Variety remarked that the film "restores Elvis Presley to the screen in a picture that seems to have been left over from the frivolous filmusicals of World War II" and called it "rather juvenile." Harrison's Reports graded the film as "Fair-to-good ... The cast performs well and direction and production values are good. A prime attraction, aside from Juliet Prowse is the beautiful scenery of Europe in wondrous Technicolor." John L. Scott of the Los Angeles Times wrote in a generally positive review, "I wouldn't actually call Elvis sophisticated in the picture, but he has grown up, for which we give thanks. And he's learning how to act, too, particularly in the lighter sequences. I'm certain most mature theatergoers will welcome the change in Presley. Now as for his squealing teenage fans—it is hoped they also will go along with the metamorphosis." Richard L. Coe of The Washington Post write that the film "probably will satisfy the audiences for which it has been so awarely, if depressingly, created." The Monthly Film Bulletin dismissed the picture as "a series of numbers loosely strung around a trite and thin and terribly insubstantial plot. Juliet Prowse manoeuvres her superbly engineered torso through two meagre dances with infectious exuberance, but she deserves a better rôle and a more mature leading man; certainly one with more genuine fire than Presley."

The film opened at the Victoria Theater in New York City on November 4, 1960 grossing $31,000 in its first week. After opening in more cities in Thanksgiving week, it reached number 2 on Variety's weekly national box office chart. It finished the year as the fourteenth biggest box office grossing film of the year generating $4.3 million.

Despite critics being dismissive of the overall plot, the film was nominated for three awards in 1961: Best Soundtrack album Grammy, Grammy for Best Vocal Performance, Album, Male, and WGA Best Written Musical.

The success of G.I. Blues may have been the catalyst for the formulaic films that Presley was to make for much of the 1960s. His next two films, Flaming Star and Wild in the Country, were more straight acting vehicles, with fewer songs and a more serious approach to the plot lines. However, despite Presley relishing a meatier role and enjoying the chance to act dramatically, both films were less successful at the box office than G.I. Blues had been, resulting in a return to the musical-comedy genre with Blue Hawaii as his next film role. Blue Hawaii proved to be even more profitable than G.I. Blues. On Rotten Tomatoes, the film has 0% rating based on 5 critics reviews.

== Soundtrack ==
The G.I. Blues soundtrack album was nominated for two Grammy Awards in 1960 in the categories Best Sound Track Album Or Recording Of Original Cast From A Motion Picture Or Television and Best Vocal Performance Album, Male. Edmund Beloin and Henry Garson were both nominated in 1961 by the Writers Guild of America for G.I. Blues in the category of Best Written American Musical.

== See also ==
- List of American films of 1960
