= Norman Taurog =

American film director (1899–1981)

- Born: Norman Rae Taurog; February 23, 1899; Chicago, Illinois, U.S.
- Died: April 7, 1981 (aged 82); Rancho Mirage, California, U.S.
- Occupations: Film director; screenwriter
- Years active: 1919−1968
- Spouses: Julie Leonard (m. 1929; div. 1943) Susan Ream Broderick (m. 1944) (1916-2008)
- Children: 3
- Awards: Academy Award for Best Director; 1932 Skippy

Norman Rae Taurog (February 23, 1899 – April 7, 1981) was an American film director and screenwriter. From 1920 to 1968, Taurog directed 180 films. At the age of 32, he received the Academy Award for Best Director for Skippy (1931), becoming the youngest person to win the award for eight and a half decades. He was later nominated for Best Director for the film Boys Town (1938). He directed some of the best-known actors of the twentieth century, including his nephew Jackie Cooper, Spencer Tracy, Mickey Rooney, Judy Garland, Deanna Durbin, Fred Astaire, Gene Kelly, Deborah Kerr, Peter Lawford, Dean Martin, Jerry Lewis, Elvis Presley and Vincent Price. Taurog directed six Martin and Lewis films, and nine Elvis Presley films, more than any other director.

For his contribution to the motion picture industry, Taurog has a star on the Hollywood Walk of Fame at 1600 Vine Street.

== Early life ==
Norman Taurog was born February 23, 1899, in Chicago, Illinois, to Jewish parents Arthur Jack Taurog and Anita (originally "Annie") Taurog (née Goldsmith). His father's naturalization records claim that Arthur was born in the Russian Empire in 1872 or 1873 and naturalized as a minor, while his mother was from New York. Later census records claimed that Arthur's parents were from Germany, and Anita's were from England. The couple were married in Chicago in 1896.

Norman became a child performer on the stage at an early age, making his movie debut at the age of 13 in the short film Tangled Relations, produced by Thomas Ince's studios. In the eight years until his next screen credit, he worked in theater, mostly off-Broadway.

== Film career ==
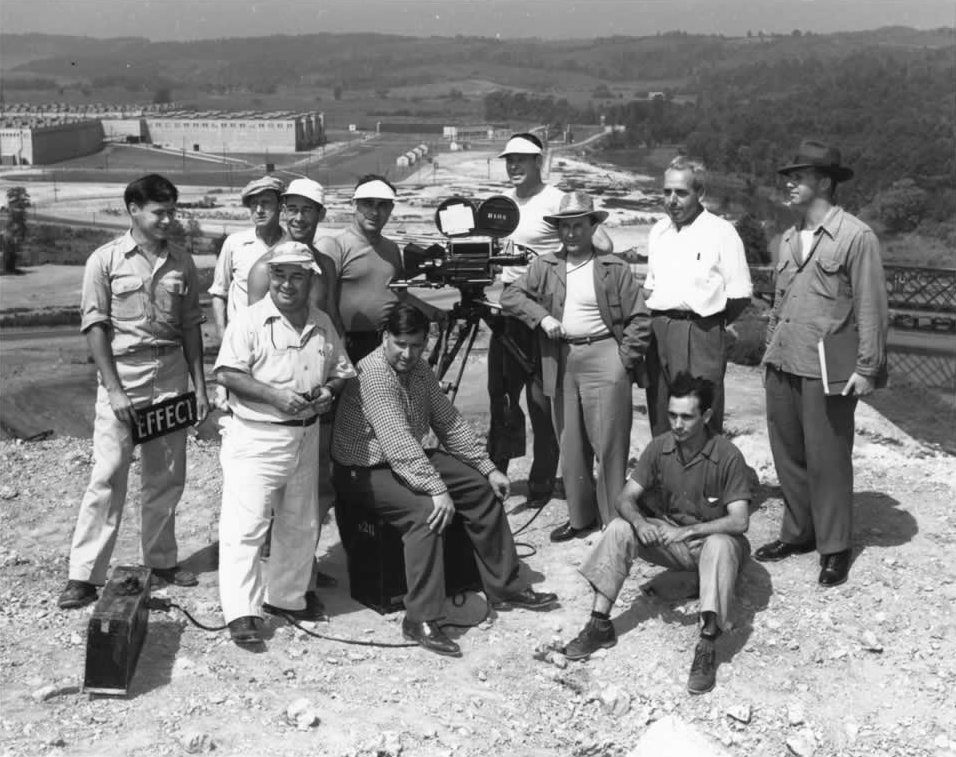
Norman Taurog (foreground, second from left) and MGM camera crew at K-25, Oak Ridge, Tennessee, in July 1946, filming The Beginning or the End (1947)

In 1919, Taurog returned to the film industry as a director, collaborating with Larry Semon in The Sportsman (1920). In the coming decade, he made 42 silent films, mostly shorts. During this time, he developed his style, his forte being light comedy although he could also deal with drama and maintain complex narratives. In early 1928, he directed his first feature-length film, The Ghetto starring George Jessel, which was expanded in late 1928 with musical and dialogue portions directed by Charles C. Wilson for eventual release as Lucky Boy (1929).

In 1931, Taurog made his breakthrough, directing Skippy, for which he won an Academy Award for Best Director. In February 2012, Taurog's Oscar award statue sold for $301,973 at an auction in Beverly Hills. Taurog's nephew Jackie Cooper was also nominated for his acting performance; in his 1981 autobiography Please Don't Shoot My Dog, Cooper wrote that during Skippy's filming, Cooper could not cry on cue in a movie scene. Taurog then had a studio security guard pretend to shoot Cooper's dog behind a prop wall, to make the child actor cry. (While this autobiography was being written, attempts were made by Cooper's editor to get Taurog's version of events; Taurog declined to participate.) Skippy tells of the adventures of the eponymous hero, his antics and adventures with his friend Sooky as they try to come up with a license for Sooky's dog, save his shantytown from demolition, sell lemonade and save for a new bike. Based on a popular comic strip character, its sentiment, comedy and moral didacticism (common with movies of the time), added to a gritty realism made it a huge success, so much so that the studio immediately scheduled a sequel, Sooky, for the following year.

The next few years saw Taurog enter the third chapter of his career, as an established director who could work in a number of genres. He directed a series of well-received films, including If I Had a Million (1932), which showed his ability to work with an all-star cast—Gary Cooper, George Raft, Charles Laughton, and W. C. Fields. In 1934, he directed We're Not Dressing, starring Bing Crosby, Carole Lombard, George Burns, Gracie Allen, and Ray Milland. In 1935, he directed the star-studded musical showcase The Big Broadcast of 1936 starring Bing Crosby and George Burns and Gracie Allen.

In 1938, Taurog brought all his skill and experience to bear with one of the liveliest and most successful adaptations of classic literature; The Adventures of Tom Sawyer was an artistic and commercial triumph. The year also brought Boys Town, showing Taurog to be more than capable of sustaining a dramatic narrative and earning him another Academy Award nomination. It wasn't all success, though. Lucky Night (1939) starring Myrna Loy and Robert Taylor was a turkey, and while Taurog shot test scenes for 1939's cinematic extravaganza The Wizard of Oz, Victor Fleming was chosen to direct. Taurog was reassigned to work on The Adventures of Tom Sawyer, a change which he had little to no say in. However, Taurog went on to earn a Best Director nomination for Boys Town later that year, despite losing out on directing Oz. He did, however, helm the last of MGM's big pre-war musical showcases, 1940's Broadway Melody, starring Fred Astaire and Eleanor Powell. He expanded his range into biographies, working with Mickey Rooney again, in the well-received Young Tom Edison (1940). He directed Judy Garland three times in the early 1940s, in Little Nellie Kelly (1940), the 'small-town-girl-gets-big-break' Presenting Lily Mars (1943), and the Gershwin musical Girl Crazy (1943).

After directing re-takes for a wartime propaganda film, Rationing (1944), Taurog entered new territory with a docudrama of the atom bomb, The Beginning or the End (1947). It was back to his metier of light comedy for his next couple of outings, The Bride Goes Wild with Van Johnson and June Allyson and Big City, both in 1948. Remarkably, he also directed a third film that year combining the genres of comedy, drama and biography and dealing with an all-star cast; Words and Music was a fictionalized biopic of the relationship between Richard Rodgers and Lorenz Hart. It starred, among others, Judy Garland, Gene Kelly, Mickey Rooney and Cyd Charisse. By now, Taurog had established a reputation as a director who was comfortable working in the musical and comedy genre, and who could be relied upon to work with slight material—qualities which would be useful later in his career.

Dean Martin and Jerry Lewis had been a double-act since 1946 and had made five films together, three Martin and Lewis top-liners, before Taurog directed Jumping Jacks (1952), regarded by many Martin and Lewis fans as the finest of their films. Taurog worked well with the duo and he went on to direct them in The Stooge (1953), The Caddy (1954), Living It Up (1955), You're Never Too Young (1954), and their penultimate film together, Pardners (1956). Taurog worked with Lewis alone twice more, in Don't Give Up the Ship (1959) and Visit to a Small Planet (1960).

In 1960, Taurog directed his first Elvis Presley film, G.I. Blues. This was a turning point for Elvis. Up until then, he had harbored ambitions of being a James Dean figure, playing brooding rebel roles in Loving You (1957), Jailhouse Rock (1957), and King Creole (1958). However, Colonel Tom Parker had different plans for the singer. G.I. Blues was Elvis's first film in two years, following his return from the army, and would set the tone for future films—a few girls, a few adventures, and a few songs along the way with weak plots and uninspired acting. When well-made, this was an entertaining, light-hearted formula and Taurog, now in his sixties, was an old hand at it. So impressed was Parker with his work that over the next eight years, Taurog directed Elvis in eight more films: Blue Hawaii (1961), Girls! Girls! Girls! (1962), It Happened at the World's Fair (1963), Tickle Me (1965), Spinout (1966), Double Trouble (1967), Speedway (1968), and Live a Little, Love a Little (1968). Although some were better than others—and some were almost identical—Taurog ensured that the films had pace, the comedy was delivered well, and the songs were well executed. Live a Little, Love a Little was his last film.

== Later years ==
In 1968, Taurog retired from directing. He later taught at the University of Southern California School of Cinema and remained a board member of the Directors Guild of America. He owned a camera shop in Canoga Park, California.

Toward the end of his life, he became blind. In his last years, he served as director of the Braille Institute in Los Angeles.

Taurog died on April 7, 1981, in Palm Desert, California, at the age of 82. His ashes were scattered into the Pacific Ocean.

Taurog has a star on the Hollywood Walk of Fame at 1600 Vine Street for his contribution to the motion picture industry.

Taurog supported Barry Goldwater in the 1964 United States presidential election.

== Awards and nominations ==
- 1931 Academy Award for Best Director (Skippy)
- 1938 Venice Film Festival Mussolini Cup for Best Film (The Adventures of Tom Sawyer)
- 1939 Academy Award Nomination for Best Director (Boys Town)
- 1960 Star on the Walk of Fame for Motion Pictures, dedicated on February 8, 1960, at 1600 Vine Street
- 1966 Laurel Award Nomination for Director, fourth place
- 1967 Laurel Award Nomination for Director, fifth place
- 1968 Laurel Award Nomination for Director, eighth place

== Filmography ==
From 1920 to 1968, Taurog directed 180 films. The following is a partial list of his feature films.

=== 1920s ===
- The Fly Cop (1920) with Larry Semon
- Lucky Boy (1929)

=== 1930s ===
- Troopers Three (1930)
- Sunny Skies (1930) with Benny Rubin and Rex Lease
- Skippy (1931) with Jackie Cooper
- Newly Rich (1931) with Mitzi Green
- Huckleberry Finn (1931) with Jackie Coogan
- Sooky (1931) with Jackie Cooper and Robert Coogan
- The Phantom President (1932) with George M. Cohan, Claudette Colbert and Jimmy Durante
- A Bedtime Story (1933) with Maurice Chevalier
- We're Not Dressing (1934) with Bing Crosby, Carole Lombard, and George Burns
- The Big Broadcast of 1936 (1935) with Bing Crosby, Ethel Merman, Dorothy Dandridge and Glenn Miller
- Rhythm on the Range (1936) with Bing Crosby and Frances Farmer
- Mad About Music (1938) with Deanna Durbin and Herbert Marshall
- The Girl Downstairs (1938) with Franciska Gaal and Franchot Tone
- The Adventures of Tom Sawyer (1938) with Tommy Kelly and Jackie Moran
- Boys Town (1938) with Spencer Tracy and Mickey Rooney

=== 1940s ===
- Young Tom Edison (1940)
- Broadway Melody of 1940 (1940) with Fred Astaire and Eleanor Powell
- Little Nellie Kelly (1940) with Judy Garland
- Men of Boys Town (1941) with Spencer Tracy and Mickey Rooney
- Design for Scandal (1941) with Rosalind Russell and Walter Pidgeon
- A Yank at Eton (1942) with Mickey Rooney
- Presenting Lily Mars (1943) with Judy Garland and Van Heflin
- Girl Crazy (1943) with Mickey Rooney and Judy Garland
- The Canterville Ghost (1944) co-directed (uncredited) with Jules Dassin
- The Beginning or the End (1947) with Brian Donlevy
- The Bride Goes Wild (1948) with Van Johnson and June Allyson
- Big City (1948) with Margaret O'Brien
- Words and Music (1948) with June Allyson, Perry Como, Judy Garland, Gene Kelly, Mickey Rooney and Cyd Charisse

=== 1950s ===
- Please Believe Me (1950) with Deborah Kerr, Robert Walker and Peter Lawford
- The Toast of New Orleans (1950) with Kathryn Grayson, Mario Lanza and David Niven
- Room for One More (1952) with Cary Grant
- Jumping Jacks (1952) with Dean Martin and Jerry Lewis
- The Stooge (1953) with Dean Martin and Jerry Lewis
- The Caddy (1953) with Dean Martin, Jerry Lewis and Donna Reed
- Light's Diamond Jubilee (1954, TV special with 6 other directors)
- Living It Up (1954) with Dean Martin, Jerry Lewis and Janet Leigh
- You're Never Too Young (1955) with Dean Martin and Jerry Lewis
- Pardners (1956) with Dean Martin and Jerry Lewis
- The Birds and the Bees (1956) with George Gobel, Mitzi Gaynor and David Niven
- The Fuzzy Pink Nightgown (1957) with Jane Russell
- Don't Give Up the Ship (1959) with Jerry Lewis

=== 1960s ===
- Visit to a Small Planet (1960) with Jerry Lewis
- G.I. Blues (1960) with Elvis Presley and Juliet Prowse
- All Hands on Deck (1961) with Pat Boone
- Blue Hawaii (1961) with Elvis Presley, Joan Blackman and Angela Lansbury
- Girls! Girls! Girls! (1962) with Elvis Presley and Stella Stevens
- Palm Springs Weekend (1963) with Troy Donahue and Connie Stevens
- It Happened at the World's Fair (1963) with Elvis Presley and Gary Lockwood
- Tickle Me (1965) with Elvis Presley and Jocelyn Lane
- Sergeant Deadhead (1965) with Frankie Avalon
- Dr. Goldfoot and the Bikini Machine (1965) with Vincent Price
- Spinout (1966) with Elvis Presley and Shelley Fabares
- Double Trouble (1967) with Elvis Presley
- Speedway (1968) with Elvis Presley, Nancy Sinatra and Bill Bixby
- Live a Little, Love a Little (1968) with Elvis Presley, Michele Carey and Dick Sargent

== See also ==
- List of oldest and youngest Academy Award winners and nominees – Youngest winners for Best Director
