= Edmund Beloin =

American screenwriter (1910–1992)

Edmund Beloin (April 1, 1910 – May 26, 1992) was an American writer of radio, film, and television.

== Biography ==
Beloin was a medical student at New York University when he changed career paths and became a writer in 1931.

Bill Morrow and Beloin were signed to The Jack Benny Program for the 1936–1937 season and remained for seven years. He created the character of Mr. Billingsley, Benny's zany, oft-hungover boarder who frequently made non sequitur remarks. Beloin liked the character so much that he played the role.

He left radio for films around June 1943. He had tried to join the Army, but was rejected on medical grounds.

He worked with Henry Garson for much of his career.

He wrote the films All in a Night's Work, G.I. Blues, Visit to a Small Planet, Don't Give Up the Ship, Paris Holiday, The Sad Sack, My Favorite Spy, The Great Lover, A Connecticut Yankee in King Arthur's Court, and Road to Rio. Garson and he were nominated for a Writers Guild of America Award for best written musical for G.I. Blues.

Beloin wrote for the television shows My Three Sons, Family Affair, The Lucy Show, and Mayberry R.F.D.

Beloin and Garson wrote the Broadway play In Any Language which was performed in fall 1952. It received negative reviews and closed after 45 performances. The television adaptation on Broadway Television Theatre, however, met warmer reception. It also aired as an episode of The Chrysler Theatre.

Beloin died of heart failure in Pompano Beach, Florida, on May 26, 1992. He was survived by a wife, Lynn, and a son, John.

== Filmography ==
=== Film ===
Year	Film	Role	Notes
1937	Artists & Models	Contributor to dialogue	Uncredited
1940	Buck Benny Rides Again	Screenplay	
1940	Love Thy Neighbor	Writer, actor	Acting role uncredited
1942	Tales of Manhattan	Restored sequence	Uncredited
1945	Lady on a Train	Screenplay	
1946	The Harvey Girls	Screenplay	
1946	Because of Him	Screenplay "Catherine the Last"	
1947	Ladies' Man	Screenplay	
1947	My Favorite Brunette	Original screenplay	
1947	Road to Rio	Original story; screenplay	
1948	A Connecticut Yankee in King Arthur's Court	Writer	
1949	Top 'o the Morning	Original screenplay	
1949	The Great Lover	Writer, producer	
1951	The Lemon Drop Kid	Story	
1951	My Favorite Spy	Adaptation/story	
1957	The Sad Sack	Writer	
1958	Paris Holiday	Screenplay	
1959	Don't Give Up the Ship	Screenplay	
1960	Visit to a Small Planet	Screenplay	
1960	G.I. Blues	Written by	
1961	All in a Night's Work	Screenplay	
1963	Donovan's Reef	Story	

=== Television ===
Year	Series	Writer	Producer	Notes
1952–1953	My Hero	No	Yes	28 episodes
1953	Broadway Television Theatre	Yes	No	Episode: "In Any Language"
1954	Kraft Theatre	Yes	No	Episode: "The Happy Touch"
1955	So This Is Hollywood	Yes	Yes	Written: "Mink Coat." Produced: 4 episodes
1956	Playhouse 90	Yes	No	Episode: "The Big Slide"
1957–1958	The Thin Man	No	Yes	20 episodes
1964	Dr. Kildare	Yes	No	Episode: "What's Different About Today?"
1965	Bob Hope Presents the Chrysler Theatre	Yes	No	Episode: "In Any Language"
1965	Vacation Playhouse	Yes	Yes	Episode: "Alec Tate"
1965–1966	The Lucy Show	Yes	No	6 episodes
1966	Mona McCluskey	Yes	No	2 episodes
1966–1968	My Three Sons	Yes	No	6 episodes
1968	Mayberry R.F.D.	Yes	No	Episode: "The Race Horse"
1968	Missy's Men	Yes	No	Teleplay by; television film
1966–1971	Family Affair	Yes	Yes	25 episodes written; 30 episodes produced
1971	The Smith Family	Yes	No	Episode: "Another Day, Another Dollar"
1990	Over My Dead Body	No	No	Suggested by his screenplay
