= Visit to a Small Planet =

1960 film by Norman Taurog

- Theatrical release poster
- Directed by: Norman Taurog
- Written by: Edmund Beloin; Henry Garson; Gore Vidal (play)
- Produced by: Hal B. Wallis
- Starring: Jerry Lewis; Joan Blackman; Earl Holliman; Fred Clark
- Cinematography: Loyal Griggs
- Edited by: Frank Bracht
- Music by: Leigh Harline
- Distributed by: Paramount Pictures
- Release date: February 4, 1960
- Running time: 85 minutes
- Language: English
- Box office: $3,200,000 (US/Canada rentals); 907,280 admissions (France)

Visit to a Small Planet is a 1960 American black-and-white science fiction comedy film directed by Norman Taurog and starring Jerry Lewis, Joan Blackman, Earl Holliman, and Fred Clark. Distributed by Paramount Pictures, it was produced by Hal B. Wallis.

Visit to a Small Planet debuted as an original television production by Gore Vidal, then was reworked by Vidal as a Broadway play starring Cyril Ritchard and Eddie Mayehoff.

The film was released on February 4, 1960. It was re-released in 1966 on a double bill with another Jerry Lewis film, The Bellboy.

== Plot ==
Kreton is an alien from the planet X-47 who is fascinated by human beings. Against the wishes of his teacher, he repeatedly visits Earth. During his latest visit, his teacher reluctantly agrees to allow him to stay and study the humans. Kreton becomes friends with a suburban family and stays with them after they agree to keep his alien status a secret. Along the way, he falls in love with their daughter. However, there is a force field around him that prevents any physical contact. His race has abolished any form of affection.

Kreton's otherworldly abilities include levitation; the ability to communicate with the family dog; and forcing people he doesn't like to recite "Mary Had A Little Lamb" in public.

After repeatedly breaking his teacher's rule against getting involved in humans' lives, all Kreton's powers are stripped away. This is so he can discover for himself that being human comes with other, less desired, emotions like pain, sadness, and jealousy. Once his cover is blown on Earth and he is reported to the police, Kreton decides that those emotions are not worth the trouble, so he returns to his own planet.

== Cast ==
- Jerry Lewis as Kreton
- Joan Blackman as Ellen Spelding
- Earl Holliman as Conrad
- Fred Clark as Major Roger Putnam Spelding
- John Williams as Delton
- Jerome Cowan as George Abercrombie
- Gale Gordon as Bob Mayberry
- Lee Patrick as Rheba Spelding
- Milton Frome as Police Commissioner
- Ellen Corby as Mrs. Mabel Mayberry
- Paul Wexler as Beatnik (uncredited)
- Barbara Bostock (credited as Barbara Lawson) as Beatnik Dancer Desdemona
- Buddy Rich as Beatnik Drummer
- Orangey as Clementine (uncredited); voice of June Foray
- Joe Turkel as Malcolm

== Production ==
Visit to a Small Planet was filmed from April 28 through July 3, 1959.

== Awards and nominations ==
Hal Pereira, Walter Tyler, Samuel M. Comer, and Arthur Krams were nominated for the 1960 Academy Award for Best Art Direction (Black and White), but lost to Alexandre Trauner and Edward G. Boyle for The Apartment.

== Original play ==
Visit to a Small Planet
- Written by: Gore Vidal
- Genre: Comedy

Premiere
- Date: February 7, 1957
- Place: Booth Theatre
- Directed by: Cyril Ritchard
- Original run: February 7, 1957 - January 11, 1958

Gore Vidal wrote Visit as a television play in which form it debuted on May 8, 1955, on Goodyear Television Playhouse. Later, he reworked it for the stage. Starring Cyril Ritchard, who also directed, and Eddie Mayehoff, the play had tryouts at the Shubert Theatre in New Haven, Connecticut January 16–19, 1957. On Broadway, it debuted on February 7, 1957, and ran for 388 performances. Ritchard received a Tony Award nomination for his performance as Kreton. Mayehoff also received a nomination for Best Performance by a Featured Actor.

Vidal intended the play as a satire on the post-World War II fear of communism in the United States, McCarthyism, Cold War military paranoia and the rising importance of television in American life. A major critical success, it was subtitled A Comedy Akin to Vaudeville.

The play tells the story of Kreton, an alien from an unnamed planet who lands on Earth intending to view the American Civil War. He miscalculates and lands instead 100 years later. Having missed the opportunity to see conflict first hand, but delighted with all the new playthings the 20th century has invented for war-making, he decides to create a war for himself.

== Home media ==
The film was released on DVD and Blu-Ray on August 22, 2017.

== Legacy ==
The film was selected by Quentin Tarantino for the third Quentin Tarantino Film Fest in Austin, Texas in 1999.

== See also ==
- List of American films of 1960
