= The Frank Sinatra Timex Show: An Afternoon With Frank Sinatra =

1959 musical television special

- Genre: Musical special
- Written by: John Bradford
- Directed by: Bill Colleran
- Starring: Frank Sinatra,
- No. of episodes: 1

Production
- Executive producers: Sammy Cahn, Jimmy Van Heusen
- Producer: Bill Colleran
- Production locations: Palm Springs, California, U.S.; ABC Television Studio, Burbank, California, U.S.
- Running time: 60 minutes

Original release
- Network: ABC
- Release: December 13, 1959

Related
- The Frank Sinatra Timex Show: Here's to the Ladies; The Frank Sinatra Timex Show: Welcome Home Elvis

The Frank Sinatra Timex Show: An Afternoon With Frank Sinatra is a 1959 television special starring Frank Sinatra and special guest Ella Fitzgerald, which aired December 13 on ABC. It was the second in a series of four hour-long, Timex-sponsored specials Sinatra would host for the network that season, airing at roughly two-month intervals. Other guests featured in this installment were vibraphonist Red Norvo and his combo, dancer Juliet Prowse, actress Hermione Gingold, and actor/fellow Rat Packer Peter Lawford.

== Production ==
Although, as originally conceived, it would have prominently featured its Palm Springs, California desert location, Afternoon had barely begun shooting before inclement weather negated any such intent. What would ultimately turn into at least two days' worth of virtually non-stop rain paused just long enough to permit completion of an elaborate production number featuring dancer Juliet Prowse. The balance of the program was eventually completed back at the ABC Television Studio in Burbank.

Songwriters Sammy Cahn and Jimmy Van Heusen served here as executive producers but also performed their more familiar function, providing the show's semi-titular opening number, "Spend the Afternoon With Me," in addition to one, "Sunlight Becomes Me," which—along with a host of sun-related standards—appears not to have survived the shoot's last-minute change of location.

== Reception ==
Taking into account the production's weather-related setbacks, Hollywood Reporter critic Hank Grant rated Sinatra's second Timex outing a "good show" (albeit "not quite match[ing] the overall excellence of his first"), noting that director Colleran "had his hands full but came off a winner." Regarding Prowse's big dance number (the sole surviving Palm Springs-set scene), Grant was struck by the "lovely panoramic effect in the open, sandy stretches, not to mention nifty toe-turns by her and a production group." Furthermore, he notes, "Fitzgerald scored highly with 'Lull in My Life' and tremendously with vocal calisthenics on a fast-paced 'Just You, Just Me,'" adding that Sinatra's renditions of "World on a String," "Here's That Rainy Day" (with Norvo), "I'll Never Smile Again" (with the Hi-Lo's), "Can't We Be Friends" (with Fitzgerald), and, lastly, "It's All Right With Me" (slowed from its traditionally brisk tempo to Sinatra's "moody ad-lib"), were "well worth an hour of anyone's time."

== Track List ==
1. "Spend the Afternoon With Me" (Cahn, Van Heusen) – Sinatra
2. "I've Got the World on a String" – Sinatra
3. "Lazy Afternoon" – The Hi-Lo's
4. "Don't Fence Me In" – Fitzgerald
5. "The Desert Is Calling" – The Hi-Lo's
6. "Comes Love" – Gingold, Lawford
7. "There's a Lull in My Life" – Fitzgerald
8. "It's All Right With Me" – Sinatra
9. "Too Darn Hot" – danced by Prowse
10. "Too Marvelous for Words" – Sinatra, Norvo
11. "Here's That Rainy Day" – Sinatra, Norvo
12. "Just You, Just Me" – Fitzgerald
13. "I'll Never Smile Again" – Sinatra, Hi-Lo's
14. "Can't We Be Friends?" – Sinatra, Fitzgerald
15. "Puttin' On the Ritz" – Prowse, Gingold, Lawford
16. "He Loves and She Loves" – Fitzgerald
17. "Love Walked In" – The Hi-Lo's
18. "Our Love Is Here to Stay" – Sinatra
19. "Love Is Sweeping the Country" – Fitzgerald, Lawford, Gingold, Prowse and Sinatra
