= Hal B. Wallis =

American film producer (1898-1986)

- Born: Aaron Blum Wolowicz; October 19, 1898; Chicago, Illinois, U.S.
- Died: October 5, 1986 (aged 87); Rancho Mirage, California, U.S.
- Resting place: Forest Lawn Memorial Park (Glendale)
- Occupation: Film producer
- Years active: 1923–1983
- Spouses: Louise Fazenda (m. 1927; died 1962) Martha Hyer (m. 1966)
- Children: 1

Harold B. Wallis (born Aaron Blum Wolowicz; October 19, 1898 – October 5, 1986) was an American film producer. He is best known for producing Casablanca (1942), The Adventures of Robin Hood (1938), and True Grit (1969), along with many other major films for Warner Bros. featuring such film stars as Humphrey Bogart, John Wayne, Bette Davis, and Errol Flynn. As a producer, he received 19 nominations for the Academy Award for Best Picture.

Later on, for a long period, he was connected with Paramount Pictures and oversaw films featuring Dean Martin, Jerry Lewis, Elvis Presley, and John Wayne.

== Life and career ==
Aaron Blum Wolowicz was born October 19, 1898 in Chicago, Illinois, the son of Eva (née Ewa Blum) and Jacob Wolowicz/Wolovitz (Jankiel Wołowicz). He was the youngest of three children and had two older sisters: Minna Wolovitz (1893–1986), a Hollywood talent agent, and Juel Wolovitz (1895–1953). His parents were Ashkenazi Jews from the Suwałki region of Congress Poland, which was then part of the Russian Empire and is now Poland. The future producer and his sisters eventually changed their surname to Wallis.

His family moved in 1922 to Los Angeles, California, where he found work as part of the publicity department at Warner Bros. in 1923. Within a few years, Wallis became involved in the production end of the business and would eventually become head of production at Warner. In a career that spanned more than 50 years, he was involved with the production of more than 400 feature-length movies.

Among the more significant movies he produced were Casablanca, Dark Victory, The Adventures of Robin Hood, The Maltese Falcon, Sergeant York, and Now, Voyager.

In March 1944, Wallis won the Academy Award for Best Picture at the 16th Academy Awards. During the ceremony, when the award was announced for Casablanca, Wallis got up to accept, but studio head Jack L. Warner rushed up to the stage "with a broad, flashing smile and a look of great self-satisfaction," Wallis later recalled. "I couldn't believe it was happening. Casablanca had been my creation; Jack had absolutely nothing to do with it. As the audience gasped, I tried to get out of the row of seats and into the aisle, but the entire Warner family sat blocking me. I had no alternative but to sit down again, humiliated and furious ... Almost forty years later, I still haven't recovered from the shock." This incident would lead Wallis to leave Warner Bros. the next month.

Wallis started to work as an independent producer, working closely with his partner Joseph H. Hazen, and enjoyed considerable success both commercially and critically. The first screenwriters he hired for his new enterprise were Ayn Rand and Lillian Hellman. Among his financial hits were the Dean Martin and Jerry Lewis comedies and several of Elvis Presley's many movies.

Actors he had under contract included Dolores Hart.

He produced True Grit, for which John Wayne won the Academy Award for Best Actor of 1969, and its sequel, Rooster Cogburn.

After moving to Universal Pictures, he produced Anne of the Thousand Days (starring Richard Burton and Canadian actress Geneviève Bujold) and Mary, Queen of Scots (starring Vanessa Redgrave and Glenda Jackson). He received 16 Academy Award producer nominations for Best Picture, winning for Casablanca in 1943.

For his consistently high quality of motion picture production, he was twice honored with the Academy Awards' Irving G. Thalberg Memorial Award. He was also nominated for seven Golden Globe awards, twice winning awards for Best Picture. In 1975, he received the Golden Globe Cecil B. DeMille Award for lifetime achievement in motion pictures.

In 1980, he published his autobiography, Starmaker, co-written with Charles Higham.

In the 1930s, Wallis invested in residential real estate development in Sherman Oaks, California. He named Halbrent Avenue after himself and/or his son, using his nickname "Hal" and his son Harold's middle name "Brent". Most of its original homes still stand, and it is very close to Ventura and Sepulveda Boulevards and the Sherman Oaks Galleria used extensively in the 1982 movie Fast Times at Ridgemont High.

Wallis and his second wife, actress Martha Hyer, contributed funds towards the construction of The Hal and Martha Hyer Wallis Theatre, a black box theater, at Northwestern University.

=== Relationships ===
Wallis was married to actress Louise Fazenda from 1927 until her death in 1962. They had one son, Harold Brent, who became a psychiatrist. Several writers including actors and producers have stated that actress Lizabeth Scott was a mistress of Wallis while he was married to Fazenda. Wallis was married to actress Martha Hyer from 1966 until his death in 1986. Hyer wanted Wallis to include Scott and his other mistresses in his autobiography, but he did not. After his marriages, Wallis watched Scott's films at home, night after night.

=== Politics ===
Wallis was a lifelong Republican, who supported Dwight D. Eisenhower in the 1952 US Presidential Election. He was also a member of the Motion Picture Alliance for the Preservation of American Ideals.

== Death ==
Wallis died on October 5, 1986, from complications of diabetes in Rancho Mirage, California, two weeks before his 88th birthday. News of his death was not released until after his private memorial service. U.S. President Ronald W. Reagan, who appeared in Wallis's films Santa Fe Trail and This Is The Army, sent his condolences to the family. Wallis is interred at the Great Mausoleum at Forest Lawn Memorial Park Cemetery in Glendale, California.

== Filmography (producer) ==
- Moby Dick (1930, co-producer and first work)
- Little Caesar (1931)
- Central Airport (1933)
- The Petrified Forest (1936)
- Kid Galahad (1937)
- West of Shanghai (1937)
- The Invisible Menace (1938)
- The Adventures of Robin Hood (1938)
- Comet Over Broadway (1938)
- Dark Victory (1939)
- The Private Lives of Elizabeth and Essex (1939)
- All This, and Heaven Too (1940)
- Castle on the Hudson (1940)
- Santa Fe Trail (1940)
- Sergeant York (1941)
- The Maltese Falcon (1941)
- They Died with Their Boots On (1941)
- Casablanca (1942)
- Now, Voyager (1942)
- Yankee Doodle Dandy (1942)
- This Is the Army (1943)
- Love Letters (1945)
- You Came Along (1945)
- The Strange Love of Martha Ivers (1946)
- Desert Fury (1947)
- I Walk Alone (1947)
- So Evil My Love (1948)
- Sorry, Wrong Number (1948)
- The Accused (1949)
- Rope of Sand (1949)
- My Friend Irma (1949)
- Paid in Full (1950)
- My Friend Irma Goes West (1950)
- September Affair (1950)
- Dark City (1950)
- The Furies (1950)
- That's My Boy (1951)
- Sailor Beware (1952)
- Jumping Jacks (1952)
- Come Back, Little Sheba (1952)
- The Stooge (1952)
- Scared Stiff (1953)
- Money from Home (1953)
- About Mrs. Leslie (1954)
- 3 Ring Circus (1954)
- Artists and Models (1955)
- The Rainmaker (1956)
- Hollywood or Bust (1956)
- Gunfight at the O.K. Corral (1957)
- Loving You (1957)
- The Sad Sack (1957)
- Hot Spell (1958)
- King Creole (1958)
- Don't Give Up the Ship (1959)
- Career (1959)
- Visit to a Small Planet (1960)
- G.I. Blues (1960)
- All in a Night's Work (1961)
- Blue Hawaii (1961)
- Summer and Smoke (1961)
- Girls! Girls! Girls! (1962)
- Fun in Acapulco (1963)
- Wives and Lovers (1963)
- Becket (1964)
- Roustabout (1964)
- The Sons of Katie Elder (1965)
- Boeing Boeing (1965)
- Paradise, Hawaiian Style (1966)
- Barefoot in the Park (1967)
- Easy Come, Easy Go (1967)
- True Grit (1969)
- Anne of the Thousand Days (1969)
- Mary, Queen of Scots (1971)
- Red Sky at Morning (1971)
- Rooster Cogburn (1975)

== Academy Awards ==
Wallis was nominated for 19 Academy Awards as producer, including five years from 1938 to 1943 in which he had multiple films nominated. He won the 1943 Academy Award for Outstanding Motion Picture for Casablanca. His production Watch on the Rhine was also nominated that year. In addition to his one competitive win, Wallis was awarded the Irving G. Thalberg Memorial Award in 1938 and 1943.

Year	Award	Film	Winner
1931–32	Outstanding Production	Five Star Final	Irving Thalberg – Grand Hotel
1932–33	Outstanding Production	I Am a Fugitive from a Chain Gang	Winfield Sheehan – Cavalcade
1934	Outstanding Production	Flirtation Walk	Harry Cohn – It Happened One Night
1935	Outstanding Production	Captain Blood	Irving Thalberg and Albert Lewin – Mutiny on the Bounty
1938	Outstanding Production	The Adventures of Robin Hood	Frank Capra – You Can't Take It With You
1938	Outstanding Production	Four Daughters	Frank Capra – You Can't Take It With You
1938	Outstanding Production	Jezebel	Frank Capra – You Can't Take It With You
1940	Outstanding Production	All This, and Heaven Too	David O. Selznick – Rebecca
1940	Outstanding Production	The Letter	David O. Selznick – Rebecca
1941	Outstanding Motion Picture	The Maltese Falcon	Darryl F. Zanuck – How Green Was My Valley
1941	Outstanding Motion Picture	One Foot in Heaven	Darryl F. Zanuck – How Green Was My Valley
1941	Outstanding Motion Picture	Sergeant York	Darryl F. Zanuck – How Green Was My Valley
1942	Outstanding Motion Picture	Kings Row	Sidney Franklin – Mrs. Miniver
1942	Outstanding Motion Picture	Yankee Doodle Dandy	Sidney Franklin – Mrs. Miniver
1943	Outstanding Motion Picture	Casablanca	Won
1943	Outstanding Motion Picture	Watch on the Rhine	
1955	Best Motion Picture	The Rose Tattoo	Harold Hecht – Marty
1964	Best Picture	Becket	Jack L. Warner – My Fair Lady
1969	Best Picture	Anne of the Thousand Days	Jerome Hellman – Midnight Cowboy
