= My Favorite Spy (1951 film) =

1951 film by Norman Z. McLeod

- 1951 US Theatrical Poster
- Directed by: Norman Z. McLeod
- Written by: Edmund L. Hartmann; Jack Sher; Hal Kanter; Lou Breslow; Edmund Beloin
- Produced by: Paul Jones
- Starring: Bob Hope; Hedy Lamarr; Francis L. Sullivan
- Cinematography: Victor Milner
- Edited by: Frank Bracht
- Music by: Victor Young
- Production company: Paramount Pictures
- Distributed by: Paramount Pictures
- Release date: December 25, 1951 (New York)
- Running time: 93 minutes
- Country: United States
- Language: English
- Box office: $2.6 million (U.S. rentals)

My Favorite Spy is a 1951 American comedy spy film directed by Norman Z. McLeod and starring Bob Hope, Hedy Lamarr and Francis L. Sullivan. It was produced and distributed by Paramount Pictures and forms the third of a loose trilogy featuring Hope that includes My Favorite Blonde and My Favorite Brunette.

== Plot ==
American intelligence agents recruit burlesque comic Peanuts White to pose as international spy Eric Augustine, whom he resembles, to acquire a million-dollar microfilm in Tangier, Morocco. While there, he encounters Lily Dalbray, a woman whom he had once known and who is now in league with his arch enemy Brubaker.

Wearing an uncomfortable money belt containing one million dollars in payoff money, Peanuts is assigned a right-hand man named Tasso. There are repeated attempts on his life, and on one occasion, he and Tasso must dodge assassins inside a two-man camel costume.

The real Eric Augustine escapes from the hospital and arrives in Tangier. He finds Lily and beats her before being killed by Brubaker's men. However, Lily thinks that it was Peanuts who had hit her and is enraged. Peanuts confesses to the deception in order to calm her.

Peanuts and Lily are captured by Brubaker and taken to his villa. Peanuts is injected with truth serum, which causes him to recite some of his old burlesque routines. After Lily switches loyalties, she and Peanuts escape after setting fire to Brubaker's mansion. They run to the nearest firehouse and don fireman uniforms, but the fire alarm returns them right back to Brubaker's house. They escape in a hijacked fire engine with Peanuts dangling precariously from the highest point of a hook-and-ladder rig.

Brubaker makes such a public spectacle of himself during the chase that he is recognized and arrested, the microfilm safely in the right hands.

== Cast ==
- Bob Hope as Peanuts White/Eric Augustine
- Hedy Lamarr as Lily Dalbray
- Francis L. Sullivan as Karl Brubaker
- Arnold Moss as Tasso
- John Archer as Henderson
- Luis Van Rooten as Rudolf Hoenig
- Stephen Chase as Donald Bailey
- Morris Ankrum as Gen. Frazer
- Angela Clarke as Gypsy Fortune Teller
- Iris Adrian as Lola
- Frank Faylen as Newton
- Mike Mazurki as Monkara
- Marc Lawrence as Ben Ali
- Tonio Selwart as Harry Crock
- Ralph Smiley as El Sarif
- Joseph Vitale as Fireman
- Nestor Paiva as Fire Chief
- Helen Chapman as Miss Dieckers
- Kasey Rogers as Maria
- Veola Vonn as Tara
- Suzanne Dalbert as Maid
- Torben Meyer as Headwaiter
- Suzanne Ridgway as Dancer
- Steven Geray as Croupier
- Joan Whitney as Woman in Bathtub (uncredited)
- Ralph Sanford as Husband of Woman in Bathtub (uncredited)
- Chester Conklin as Short Man Hiding in Closet (uncredited)
- Hank Mann as Short Man Hiding in Closet (uncredited)
- Roy Roberts as Johnson, FBI Agent (uncredited)
- Duke York as Man (uncredited)
- Ralph Byrd as Unnamed Government Official (uncredited)
- Rolfe Sedan as Room Service Waiter (uncredited)
- Norbert Schiller as Dr. Estrallo (uncredited)

== Production ==
The film was produced from late January to early April 1951 under the working title Passage to Cairo.

Hope's character was first conceived as a schoolteacher who, while impersonating a recently deceased gangster, is sent to Cairo to obtain information. The character was later converted into the Peanuts White vaudeville comedian.

== Release ==
The world premiere of the film took place in Bellaire, Ohio in the living room of Anne Kuchinka, a housewife who had won a letter-writing contest sponsored by Hope's radio show, selected from among 250,000 entrants. Many of the townspeople of Bellaire also wrote Hope to lobby on Kuchinka's behalf. A parade was held and Hope hosted a show for the town featuring guests Rhonda Fleming, Gloria Grahame, Marilyn Maxwell, Jan Sterling and Jerry Colonna, with music by Les Brown and his band. Hope conducted his regular radio show live from the town's high-school auditorium.

== Reception ==
In a contemporary review for The New York Times, critic A. H. Weiler wrote: "'My Favorite Spy' is difficult to believe but because of its harried hero's breezy delivery it does generate a generous portion of laughs."

== See also ==
- My Favorite Blonde (1942) with Bob Hope and Madeleine Carroll
- My Favorite Brunette (1947) with Bob Hope and Dorothy Lamour
