= Joseph H. Hazen =

American film producer and philanthropist (1898–1994)

- Born: May 23, 1898; Kingston, New York, U.S.
- Died: November 13, 1994 (aged 96); Boca Raton, Florida, U.S.
- Occupations: Lawyer, film producer, art collector and philanthropist
- Years active: 1923-1970

Joseph H. Hazen (May 23, 1898 – November 13, 1994) was an American film producer and philanthropist.

== Early life ==
Hazen was born in 1898 in Kingston, New York, the son of a shoe store owner and the grandson of an immigrant who had opened a dry goods store in Kingston. Hazen enlisted the navy in 1917 and after the war was based in Washington, D.C., where he attended George Washington University and studied law.

== Career ==
It was through the legal firm Thomas and Friedman that in 1923 Hazen first came into contact with the film industry. He joined Warner Brothers the following year and became personal assistant of Harry Warner. One of his accomplishments in film production was the negotiation for the use of sound technology in film, which led to the first musical score in film, Don Juan, and the first "talkie," The Jazz Singer, in 1927. In 1944, Hazen and producer Hal Wallis left Warner Brothers and created their own independent production company. Hazen and Wallis worked together for many years, signing talents such talents as Elvis Presley, Dean Martin, and Jerry Lewis. Hazen retired from the company in 1969, though he and Wallis worked together for their last film in 1970. Hazen was also an art collector and philanthropist, activities that he pursued through the creation in 1957 of the Joseph H. Hazen Foundation. He was an admirer of Albert Einstein and took a strong interest in the history of science; after his death, his foundation funded the Joseph H. Hazen Education Prize, awarded each year by the History of Science Society.

== Personal life ==
Hazen married Lita Annenberg in 1936, with whom, he had two daughters.

== Death ==
Hazen died in Boca Raton, Florida, on November 13, 1994. He was predeceased in death by his two daughters and was survived by his wife.
