= Blue Hawaii =

1961 film by Norman Taurog

- Theatrical release poster
- Directed by: Norman Taurog
- Screenplay by: Hal Kanter
- Story by: Allan Weiss
- Produced by: Hal B. Wallis
- Starring: Elvis Presley; Joan Blackman; Angela Lansbury; Nancy Walters
- Cinematography: Charles Lang Jr.
- Edited by: Terry O. Morse
- Music by: Joseph J. Lilley
- Production company: Hal Wallis Productions
- Distributed by: Paramount Pictures
- Release date: November 22, 1961 (United States)
- Running time: 102 minutes
- Country: United States
- Language: English
- Box office: $4.2 million (US/ Canada rentals)

Blue Hawaii is a 1961 American musical romantic comedy drama film directed by Norman Taurog and starring Elvis Presley. The screenplay by Hal Kanter was nominated by the Writers Guild of America in 1962 in the category of Best Written American Musical. The film opened at number two in box office receipts for that week and, despite mixed reviews from critics, finished as the 10th top-grossing film of 1961 and 14th for 1962 in the Variety national box office survey, earning $5 million. The film won a fourth place prize Laurel Award in the category of Top Musical of 1961.

== Plot ==
Having been released from the Army, Chadwick "Chad" Gates is eager to return to Hawaii with his surfboard, his native Hawaiian beach friends, and his mixed-race girlfriend Maile Duval. His mother, Sarah Lee, wants him to follow in his father's footsteps and take over management at the Great Southern Hawaiian Fruit Company, the family business, but Chad is reluctant and goes to work as a tour guide at his girlfriend's agency. His slightly scatter-brained boss is Mr. Chapman.

The first clients Chad has are an attractive school teacher, Abigail Prentice, and four teenage female students. One of the students, 17-year-old Ellie Corbett, seems self-centered and doesn't get along with the other three, but she becomes smitten with Chad. Chad's girlfriend, Maile, becomes jealous of Abigail, who is quite fond of Chad. After Ellie's flirtatious ways with another tourist cause a wild fight to erupt in a restaurant, Mr. Chapman fires Chad. Maile quits her job in protest. Maile and Chad independently continue guiding Abigail and the four youths, taking them to Kaua'i.

One night Ellie attempts to seduce Chad in his hotel room, but he refuses her advances; at the same moment, Maile pays a surprise visit to the hotel. Ellie despondently flees in a stolen jeep, and runs into the surf intending to drown herself in the ocean. Chad catches up to her, pulls her out of the ocean, attempts to speak to her, but then decides to punish her with a spanking. In the next scene, the girls, including Ellie, are having breakfast. Ellie is now pleasant, friendly and well-mannered, and jokes about the spanking while sitting on a pillow. Meanwhile, Abigail has found romance with Jack Kelman, a longtime business partner of Chad's father. With Jack's help, Chad and his father resolve their differences about Chad's future.

Chad and Maile form their own tourism business—Gates of Hawaii—and begin arrangements to provide tourist services for his father's large network of fruit salesmen in the U.S. and Canada. The film ends with Chad's and Maile's lavish outdoor wedding.

== Cast ==
- Elvis Presley as Chad Gates
- Joan Blackman as Maile Duval
- Angela Lansbury as Sarah Lee Gates
- Nancy Walters as Abigail Prentice
- Roland Winters as Fred Gates
- John Archer as Jack Kelman
- Howard McNear as Mr. Chapman
- Steve Brodie as Tucker Garvey
- Darlene Tompkins as Patsy Simon
- Iris Adrian as Enid Garvey
- Hilo Hattie as Waihila
- Jenny Maxwell as Ellie Corbett
- Pamela Austin as Selena "Sandy" Emerson (as Pamela Kirk)
- Christian Kay as Beverly Martin
- Lani Kai as Carl Tanami
- Jose De Vega as Ernie Gordon
- Frank Atienza as Ito O'Hara
- Tiki Hanalei as Ping Pong
- Flora Kaai Hayes as Maile's grandmother (uncredited)

== Production ==
Blue Hawaii was the first of three Elvis films shot in Hawaii, followed by Girls! Girls! Girls! in 1962 and Paradise, Hawaiian Style in 1965. Producer Hal B. Wallis was keen to put Presley in a film that showed how the army affected a man. Actress Juliet Prowse, who had starred with Presley in GI Blues, was approached to be his love interest again. But after her demands were put forward, Paramount decided to drop her for the role, choosing Joan Blackman instead. Presley was apparently so pale before shooting that Wallis personally recommended a brand of tanning lamp to darken his skin. The film was announced in the fall of 1960 as Hawaii Beach Boy. At the time, film producer Walter Mirisch had a film titled Hawaii in production, and he was upset that Wallis had chosen such a similar name.

Presley arrived in Hawaii on March 18, 1961, to prepare for a charity concert he was giving on March 25 to raise funds for the Arizona Memorial at Pearl Harbor. He arrived at the recording studio on March 21 to start recording the film's soundtrack. Three weeks later, location filming had finished, including scenes at Waikiki Beach, Diamond Head, Mount Tantalus, and Hanauma Bay, a volcanic crater that is open to the sea, near the bedroom community of Hawaii Kai, a few miles away from Waikiki. After location filming, the crew returned to the Paramount lot to finish other scenes for the film. Presley relaxed during filming by giving karate demonstrations with his friend and employee, Red West, which resulted in Presley's fingers becoming bruised and swollen. Wallis warned the female stars of the film to avoid parties Presley hosted because they were turning up for shooting looking tired.

Wallis used the box office returns from Blue Hawaii to finance an upcoming Wallis film, 1964's Becket, starring Richard Burton and Peter O'Toole.

Presley was 26 at the time this film was released, and a not yet 36-year-old Angela Lansbury played his character's mother. Nancy Walters, who was cast as the older schoolteacher, was in reality only 18 months older than Presley.

Much of the film was shot on location at the Coco Palms Resort on the east coast of Kauai.

Although it is mentioned in the film that Chad's parents live in Kāhala, one of the most expensive and exclusive areas of Honolulu in 1961, the view from their "lanai" (porch or terrace) shows Diamond Head as it appears from Waikiki and downtown Honolulu. In actuality, Kāhala is on the other side of Diamond Head from Waikiki.

Several scenes were filmed in and around Waikiki Beach, including the opening driving scenes and the office scene across the street from the "International Market". The scenes in which Chad's clients stay in a hotel and in which he picks up his tour group – as well as those on the beach where he spends time with Maile – were all filmed on the property now known as the Hilton Hawaiian Village on Waikiki Beach.

== Reception ==
Howard Thompson of The New York Times called the film "blandly uneventful" with a "nonsensical and harmless" plot, though he wrote that Presley "delivers the songs and rhythmical spasms right on schedule. We counted fourteen tunes, about half of them replete with ukulele trimmings and exotic, weaving dancers. One of them, a number called 'Beach Boy Blues,' is nifty, and Presley delivers it accordingly. No kidding." Variety wrote, "Hal Kanter's breezy screenplay, from a story by Allan Weiss, is the slim, but convenient, foundation around which Wallis and staff have erected a handsome, picture-postcard production crammed with typical South Seas musical hulaballoo ... Under Norman Taurog's broad direction, Presley, in essence, is playing himself—a role sure to delight his ardent fans." Harrison's Reports graded the film "Fair", adding: "As is the custom in a Presley production, the crooner-gyrater dominates the running time of the film. That is why, it is more the pity, now that he has so many films under his acting belt that he still continues to deliver such an embarrassingly poor performance." John L. Scott of the Los Angeles Times wrote that the film "does a lot for the 'paradise of the Pacific,' showing its foamy waves, palm trees, luaus and a couple of plush hotels, but not very much for Elvis' fans (what age bracket does he appeal to now?) ... One of these days Elvis will play a straight role with substance, and we'll definitely find out whether he can act or not."

== Accolades ==
The film is recognized by American Film Institute in these lists:

- 2004: AFI's 100 Years...100 Songs:
  - "Blue Hawaii" – Nominated

== Soundtrack ==
Presley's remake of the title song introduced it to an audience too young to remember Bing Crosby's original hit version.

The Blue Hawaii soundtrack was on the Billboard Pop Albums chart for 79 weeks, where it spent 20 weeks at #1. It has been certified by the RIAA for sales of three million copies in the U.S. The album was nominated for a Grammy Award in 1961 in the category of Best Sound Track Album or Recording of Original Cast from a Motion Picture or Television.

The soundtrack featured Presley's hit song "Can't Help Falling in Love," certified Platinum by the RIAA for U.S. sales in excess of one million copies. The song peaked at No. 2 on the U.S. Billboard Hot 100 and hit No. 1 on the Adult Contemporary chart for six weeks, as well as topping the British charts in 1962. As of March 4, 2024, "Can't Help Falling in Love" was the most streamed Elvis Presley song, with streams on Spotify totaled at 836,193,249; YouTube streams on the Elvis Presley channel totaled in excess of 400 million on the same date.

== See also ==
- List of American films of 1961
