= Paris Holiday (1958 film) =

1958 film by Gerd Oswald

- Film poster
- Directed by: Gerd Oswald
- Written by: Bob Hope (story); Edmund Beloin; Dean Riesner
- Produced by: Bob Hope; C.R. Foster-Kemp (associate)
- Starring: Bob Hope; Fernandel; Anita Ekberg; Martha Hyer
- Cinematography: Roger Hubert
- Edited by: Ellsworth Hoagland
- Music by: Joseph J. Lilley (score); Jimmy Van Heusen (song-music); Sammy Cahn (song-lyrics)
- Distributed by: United Artists
- Release dates: February 27, 1958 (world premiere, London); March 28, 1958 (Los Angeles)
- Running time: 103 minutes
- Country: United States
- Language: English
- Box office: $1.5 million

Paris Holiday is a 1958 American action comedy film, starring Bob Hope, which was directed by Gerd Oswald, and written by Edmund Beloin and Dean Riesner from a story by Hope. The film also features French comedian Fernandel, Anita Ekberg and Martha Hyer, and a rare appearance by writer/director Preston Sturges. The film was shot in Technirama and Technicolor in Paris and in the French village of Gambais.

The film initially focuses on an American comedian who is traveling to France to meet with a screenwriter. He is wrongly suspected by secret agents to be transporting incriminating manuscripts. In Paris, the screenwriter is murdered and the comedian is arrested as a murder suspect. The local authorities use him as bait for the actual criminals, and he is soon chased all over Paris by the criminal underworld.

== Plot ==
Popular American comedian Bob Hunter (Bob Hope), star of stage, movies and television, boards the luxury liner SS Île de France to travel to France, only to find his French counterpart, Fernydel (Fernandel) is on the ship as well. Also on board are elegant blonde diplomat Ann McCall (Martha Hyer), whom Bob would like to get to know better, and stunning Zara Brown (Anita Ekberg), the agent for a French criminal organization which suspects that Bob is carrying an incriminating manuscript. While Bob pursues Ann, with Fernydel's help, Zara repeatedly searches Bob's stateroom, causing problems when Ann sees her leaving after a search.

When he reaches Paris, Bob visits Serge Vitry (Preston Sturges), a writer whose script Bob has come to purchase, but is told that Vitry is no longer interested in comedy: he is writing a true-life drama which he is going to produce himself. Bob pleads for a look, and is told where he can get a translated copy. A series of suspicious accidents and mishaps then leads to Bob being arrested as a suspect in the murder of Serge, but he is rescued by the American ambassador (André Morell) and Inspector Dupont (Yves Brainville), who tell him that Serge used his manuscript to reveal the identities of counterfeiters who had infiltrated their way into high offices in the French government, which is why he was murdered. The two men ask Bob to serve as bait to flush out the criminals. Bob agrees, but only because Ann's life is also in danger. Helped by Ann, Fernandel, and villainess-turned-heroine Zara, Bob is chased all over Paris by the underworld, at one point winding up in a mental asylum for safekeeping. It all ends with an escape by helicopter piloted by Fernandel (actually John Crewdson) reading a book of flight instructions, capture of a group of assassins, then a parade for Bob, Fernandel and Ann, who are heroes.

== Cast ==
- Bob Hope as Bob Hunter
- Fernandel as Fernydel
- Anita Ekberg as Zara
- Martha Hyer as Ann McCall
- Preston Sturges as Serge Vitry
- André Morell as American Ambassador
- Alan Gifford as American Consul
- Maurice Teynac as Doctor Bernais
- Yves Brainville as Inspector Dupont
- Jean Murat as Judge
- Irène Tunc as Shipboard Lovely

Cast notes:

- Bob Hope's character is named "Robert Leslie Hunter", although he is always referred to as "Bob Hunter" in the film. Hope's real name is Leslie Townes Hope.
- This was writer/director Preston Sturges' fourth and last on-screen appearance in a feature film. Sturges did a walk-on in his 1940 film Christmas in July ("Man at shoeshine stand"), played the small part of a film director in his Sullivan's Travels (1941), and appeared as himself in Paramount's 1942 all-star extravaganza Star Spangled Rhythm.
- Hope and Sturges had worked together almost 20 years earlier, when Sturges was one of the writers on Never Say Die (1939), one of Hope's first hits.

== Songs ==
- "Paris Holiday" - by Jimmy Van Heusen (music) and Sammy Cahn (lyrics), sung behind the credits by a chorus
- "Nothing in Common" - by Jimmy Van Heusen (music) and Sammy Cahn (lyrics), sung by Bob Hope and Martha Hyer, but cut from the film

Other songs that appear:

- "April in Paris" - by Vernon Duke (music) and E. Y. Harburg (lyrics)
- "The Last Time I Saw Paris" - by Jerome Kern (music) and Oscar Hammerstein, II (lyrics)

== Production ==
Paris Holiday had the working title of "Trouble in Paris".

Although Hope initiated production of the film, and came up with the story idea, the intent for the film to be a showcase for both himself and Fernandel is indicated by the opening credits, where Hope's name and Fernandel take turns being listed first.

The film was in production in France from early April to late June 1957 Originally filming took place the Boulogne Studios before moving to the Joinville Studios due to delays. Location shooting took place in Paris, and in the village of Gambais. The film's World Premiere took place in England on 27 February 1958 at the London Pavilion theatre with Bob Hope and Fernandel in attendance. It opened in Los Angeles on 28 March 1958, and went into general release shortly after. It was marketed with the tagline: The Comedy Team Of The Century.

Hope described the difficulties involved in producing Paris Holiday in his book I Owe Russia $1200.

Hope and Bing Crosby recorded two songs written for the movie - "Paris Holiday" and "Nothing in Common" - for United Artists Records in February 1958. Crosby did not appear in the movie.
