= Here's That Rainy Day =

1953 song by Jimmy Van Heusen and Johnny Burke

Song by Dolores Gray
- Published: 1953
- Composer: Jimmy Van Heusen
- Lyricist: Johnny Burke

"Here's That Rainy Day" is a popular song with music by Jimmy Van Heusen and lyrics by Johnny Burke that was published in 1953. It was introduced by Dolores Gray in the Broadway musical Carnival in Flanders.

The musical was based on the 1935 French film comedy also titled Carnival in Flanders. Originally, Harold Arlen was going to compose the musical's score, but he bowed out and was replaced by Van Heusen. Veteran film director Preston Sturges was hired to salvage the musical three weeks before its Broadway debut, but the show closed after only six performances. Nonetheless, Dolores Gray won a Tony Award for Best Actress in a Musical, a standing record for the shortest running Tony Award–winning role.

Today, the production is primarily remembered for a song Gray performed, "Here's That Rainy Day", which in time became established as a jazz standard. Composer Alec Wilder calls it "a very difficult song, almost demanding its harmony's presence for a singer not to get lost in the complex line. ... It's a very powerful and affecting song. It has great weight and authority and must have been a song written under extremely intense circumstances. In my opinion it is a great illustration of absolute honesty, quite irrespective of its extremely inventive character as a melody."

== Frank Sinatra performances ==
Frank Sinatra recorded the song on March 25, 1959, for the Capitol album No One Cares, arranged and conducted by Gordon Jenkins. Sinatra also performed it on a Timex-sponsored show titled The Frank Sinatra Timex Show: An Afternoon With Frank Sinatra broadcast on December 13, 1959, and on the Emmy-nominated Francis Albert Sinatra Does His Thing, broadcast on November 25, 1968. On November 18, 1973, he performed it on his television comeback special, Magnavox Presents Frank Sinatra, in a medley with "Last Night When We Were Young" and "Violets for Your Furs". In addition, Sinatra performed the song during three concerts in 1974 at Caesar's Palace in Philadelphia and Saratoga Springs, New York. As jazz critic Ted Gioia notes, "the song was virtually unknown to jazz players during the 1950s, and only Frank Sinatra's intervention put 'Here's That Rainy Day' on the map."

== Other notable versions ==
The song has gone on to become a major jazz standard; it is the most widely covered song of 1953, with more than 700 versions as of 2025. Some other notable recordings of it include the following:

- Carmen McRae from Bittersweet (Focus, 1964)
- Paul Desmond from Easy Living (RCA, 1965)
- Ella Fitzgerald from The First Lady of Song (Polygram, 1965)
- Wes Montgomery from Bumpin' (Verve, 1965)
- Elvin Jones & Richard Davis from Heavy Sounds (Impulse!, 1967)
- Denny Zeitlin from Zeitgeist (Columbia, 1967)
- Bill Evans from Alone (Verve, 1968)
- Gary Burton & Stéphane Grappelli from Paris Encounter (Atlantic, 1969)
- Joe Pass from Virtuoso (Pablo, 1973)
- Kenny Rankin from The Kenny Rankin Album (Atlantic, 1976)
- Michel Petrucciani from Pianism (Blue Note, 1985)

Singer/songwriter Paul Williams performed the song on The Tonight Show Starring Johnny Carson in ape makeup as part of promotion for his 1973 film Battle for the Planet of the Apes. Show host Johnny Carson said "Here's That Rainy Day" by Frank Sinatra was his favorite song and sang it with Bette Midler on the penultimate episode of the Carson show on May 21, 1992. After Carson's death in 2005, Doc Severinsen, Tommy Newsom, and Ed Shaughnessy performed the song with Paul Shaffer and the CBS Orchestra on Late Show with David Letterman. It is also featured in the 2022 movie Tár.
