= Bing Crosy and Dean Martin Present: The Frank Sinatra Timex Show =

1959 musical television special

- Genre: Musical special
- Written by: John Bradford
- Directed by: Bill Colleran
- Creative director: Jim Trittipo
- Presented by: Dean Martin, Bing Crosby
- Starring: Frank Sinatra,
- Music by: Nelson Riddle
- Country of origin: United States
- Original language: English
- No. of episodes: 1

Production
- Executive producers: Sammy Cahn, Jimmy Van Heusen
- Producer: Bill Colleran
- Running time: 60 minutes
- Production company: Hobart Productions

Original release
- Network: ABC
- Release: October 19, 1959

Related
- The Frank Sinatra Timex Show: Here's to the Ladies; The Frank Sinatra Timex Show: Welcome Home Elvis

Bing Crosby and Dean Martin Present: The Frank Sinatra Timex Show was the first of four hour long specials that Frank Sinatra starred in from late 1959 to early 1960 sponsored by Timex. It aired on ABC on Oct. 19, 1959.

== Track list ==
- "High Hopes" - Sinatra, Gaynor and Martin
- Opening title
- "Day In, Day Out" - Sinatra
- Timex advertisement with John Cameron Swayze
- "Together (Wherever We Go), from the musical Gypsy - Sinatra, Dean and Crosby
- Mitzi Gaynor performs her iconic hurricane dance
- "Talk to Me" - Sinatra
- "Cheek to Cheek" - Gaynor, Martin, Crosby, Sinatra
- Timex advertisement with John Cameron Swayze
- "Wrap Your Troubles in Dreams"
- After a discussion of what constitutes an "old song", a medley of "Down by the Old Mill Stream" (Crosby), "The Old Gray Mare" (Sinatra), and "In the Shade of the Old Apple Tree" (Martin), "That Old Feeling" (Sinatra), "Down the Old Ox Road" (Crosby), "Rockin' Chair" (Martin), "Old Devil Moon" (Sinatra), "You're an Old Smoothie" (Martin), "Just an Old Flame" (Crosby), "Ol' Man River (Crosby, Martin and Sinatra)
- A rendition of a "High Hopes", with the assistance of a large children's choir, who are all alleged to be Dean Martin kids. He pulls one Asian American girl to him and she says she was drafted by his son, Ricky. Ricky states they were all brought here by their nanny, who turns old to be Mitze Gaynor.
- Swayze introduces another Timex ad, this time a lady's watch. Its durability is tested by Toni Carrol on various kitchen appliances.
- "Just One of Those Things" - Sinatra and band
- "The Lady is a Tramp" - Sinatra and band
- Sinatra advertises that he will be in a movie about one of the greatest nightclub performers, Jimmy Durante. He, Crosby and Martin sing Durante's songs "Start Off Each Day With A Song"; they are joined by Gaynor and Durante himself for "Bill Bailey".

== Cast ==
- Frank Sinatra
- Dean Martin
- Mitzi Gaynor
- Jimmy Durante
- Nelson Riddle and his Orchestra
- Bill Miller - pianist
