= My Favorite Brunette =

1947 film by Elliott Nugent

- Theatrical release poster
- Directed by: Elliott Nugent
- Screenplay by: Edmund Beloin; Jack Rose
- Produced by: Danny Dare
- Starring: Bob Hope; Dorothy Lamour; Peter Lorre; Lon Chaney Jr.
- Cinematography: Lionel Lindon
- Edited by: Ellsworth Hoagland
- Music by: Robert Emmett Dolan
- Production company: Hope Enteriprises
- Distributed by: Paramount Pictures
- Release date: April 4, 1947
- Running time: 87 minutes
- Country: United States
- Language: English
- Box office: $3.1 million (US rentals)

My Favorite Brunette

My Favorite Brunette is a 1947 American romantic comedy film and film noir parody, directed by Elliott Nugent and starring Bob Hope and Dorothy Lamour. Written by Edmund Beloin and Jack Rose, the film is about a baby photographer on death row in San Quentin State Prison who tells reporters his history. While taking care of his private-eye neighbor's office, he is asked by an irresistible baroness to find a missing baron, which initiates a series of confusing but sinister events in a gloomy mansion and a private sanatorium. Spoofing movie detectives and the film noir style, the film features Lon Chaney Jr. playing Willie, a character based on his Of Mice and Men role Lennie; Peter Lorre as Kismet, a comic take on his many film noir roles; and cameo appearances by film noir regular Alan Ladd and Hope partner Bing Crosby. Sequences were filmed in San Francisco and Pebble Beach, California.

== Plot ==
The story is told in flashback from Death Row as Ronnie Jackson (Bob Hope) relates to a group of reporters the events that led to his murder conviction. In San Francisco, Ronnie works as a child photographer who dreams of being a private detective like his office neighbor Sam McCloud (Alan Ladd). One day, he is mistaken for McCloud by mysterious woman in distress, Carlotta Montay (Dorothy Lamour), who claims that her wheelchair-using husband was kidnapped. Carlotta gives Ronnie her address, a map, and a $5,000 ring as payment, telling him that no one must know he's a detective. Ronnie hides the map in the cups next to his office water cooler.

Ronnie drives to the address, a mansion down the Peninsula. Kismet (Peter Lorre) greets Ronnie at the door and steals his handgun. Carlotta tells Ronnie that the missing man is not her husband, but actually her uncle who was on secret mission. She says the mansion belongs to her uncle's former partner Major Montague. Major Montague then enters the room and tells Carlotta she has a phone call. When Carlotta leaves, Montague says he knows Ronnie is a private detective and claims Carlotta is mentally ill, showing him her "uncle", a wheelchair-using man in the next room who obviously has not been kidnapped. When Carlotta returns she claims it was her uncle on the phone. Now convinced Carlotta is mentally ill, Ronnie tries to get out of his deal to help her despite her flirtatious nature nearly winning him over. As Ronnie leaves, he discovers his handgun is missing and notices the "uncle" inside the mansion standing up. Ronnie realizes he has been duped and snaps a keyhole photo of Montague's gang as evidence, but Kismet notices and chases him before he escapes by getting buzzed into a building. Ronnie develops the photo, but Kismet knocks him out and burns the photo negative.

When Ronnie comes to, the prior day's photo customer arrives and Ronnie gives her what he thinks is her child's photo negative. He then alerts the San Francisco Police Department and returns to the mansion, only to find it deserted with Kismet posing as the gardener, prompting the police to depart. Kismet then plants Carlotta's ring with a note attached to leave as a clue for Ronnie to discover. This fake clue leads Ronnie to Seacliffe Lodge in Carmel, which he does not realize is a sanatorium. After a bizarre golf match with an inmate and an imaginary golf ball, Ronnie is captured by the Montague gang and locked in a room, and learns Carlotta is a patient there too. Montague explains that Carlotta's uncle, a real person, turned down his offer to buy mineral rights, and brings him into the room; he gives Carlotta a cigarette. Ronnie is interrogated for the location of the map, and Carlotta lies that the map is at the Ferry Building; Montague sends a stooge to retrieve it.

Returned to their rooms, Carlotta unwraps the cigarette to find a secret message directing her to "James Collins", a scientist. Ronnie and Carlotta escape and meet Collins to show him the map, which he identifies as depicting cryolite deposits from which uranium can be mined. He says that Carlotta's uncle had scheduled an important meeting with the government at the Pilgrim Hotel in Washington, D.C.. Collins pockets the map, and Ronnie drives him to the police station so he can testify. As Ronnie parks, Kismet, who's hiding in the back seat with Ronnie's gun, shoots Collins and steals the map. Ronnie and the dead Collins are discovered by the police, and Ronnie flees the scene, now wanted for Collins' murder.

Carlotta and a disguised Ronnie fly to Washington and go to the Pilgrim Hotel, where they apply as a bellboy and a maid. In the Montague gang's suite, they record the gang's confessions, including Kismet's confession that he murdered Collins. But, when the police are called, Kismet switches the records and throws the incriminating record out the window. Ronnie is arrested for Collins' murder and taken away; the gang still has the map and Carlotta's real uncle.

The flashback ends. Ronnie is on death row, cursing Carlotta for disappearing and not testifying at his trial. When the warden comes to get Ronnie for this execution, Ronnie faints. When he comes to, Carlotta is there and tells him that he is a free man: Ronnie had mistakenly given the keyhole photo negative to his customer. The photo revealed the "uncle" as an impostor. Carlotta said that a detective captured the gang, and "the rest was routine". Ronnie is cleared, and Carlotta's uncle is safe. The warden tells the executioner that the execution was cancelled. The executioner (Bing Crosby) curses and walks away as Ronnie and Carlotta embrace.

== Cast ==
- Bob Hope as Ronnie Jackson
- Dorothy Lamour as Baroness Carlotta Montay
- Peter Lorre as Kismet
- Lon Chaney Jr. as Willie
- John Hoyt as Dr. Lundau
- Charles Dingle as Major Simon Montague
- Reginald Denny as James Collins
- Frank Puglia as Baron Montay
- Ann Doran as Miss Rogers
- Willard Robertson as Prison Warden
- Jack La Rue as Tony
- Charles Arnt as Crawford
- Alan Ladd as Sam McCloud (cameo appearance)
- Bing Crosby as Would-be Executioner Harry (cameo appearance)
- Jean Wong as Mrs. Fong (uncredited)
- Roland Soo Hoo as Mrs. Fong's Toddler Son (uncredited)
- Clarence Muse as Death Row Inmate (uncredited)
- Anthony Caruso as Death Row Inmate (uncredited)
- James Flavin as Detective Hennessey (uncredited)

== Reception ==
Bosley Crowther of The New York Times liked the film, saying: "Paramount knows a good thing when it sees one, especially when it earns a pile of bucks. And it also knows that there is magic in the juxtaposition of Mr. Hope and a dame—any dame this side of Woodlawn—and a preposterously turbulent plot. That's why the Paramount's new picture, the aforementioned 'My Favorite Brunette,' which candidly observes these criteria, is a commendably funny film."

My Favorite Brunette was described by a reviewer for the St. Petersburg Times as a "first rate [Bob] Hope performance".

== Home media ==
In 1975, the film entered the public domain in the United States because the claimants did not renew its copyright registration in the 28th year after publication.

My Favorite Brunette has been widely available on home video with most copies varying in picture and sound quality. It was released by Video Treasures in early 1995 on VHS under license from All American Television and Columbia Pictures Television. There have been authorized video releases of the film, under license from the Bob Hope estate and distributor FremantleMedia North America, using the original negatives stored at Sony. The film was released by BCI Eclipse Company in 2007 in an HD DVD double feature with Son of Paleface, and Shout! Factory in 2010 in a DVD box set with other Hope films. Kino Lorber released the film on DVD and Blu-ray in 2017.

== See also ==
- List of films in the public domain in the United States
- My Favorite Blonde (1942) with Bob Hope and Madeleine Carroll
- My Favorite Spy (1951) with Bob Hope and Hedy Lamarr
