= Alcoa Theatre =

American TV anthology series (1957–1960)

- DeForest Kelley on Alcoa Theatre 1960
- Genre: Anthology
- Written by: Bob Barbash; Frederick Brady; Fred Freiberger; Leonard Freeman; Fred F. Finklehoffe; Christopher Knopf; Ruth McKenney; Stirling Silliphant; George F. Slavin
- Directed by: Robert Florey; Alvin Ganzer; Tay Garnett; Byron Haskin; Paul Henreid; Don McDougall; Robert Ellis Miller; Don Siegel; David Swift; Don Taylor; Don Weis; Paul Wendkos
- Starring: David Niven; Robert Ryan; Jane Powell; Jack Lemmon; Charles Boyer
- Theme music composer: George Duning; Johnny Williams
- Composer: George Duning (2.4); Harry Sukman (3.17); John Williams (1.4, 2.1)
- Country of origin: United States
- Original language: English
- No. of seasons: 3
- No. of episodes: 114

Production
- Producers: Vincent M. Fennelly; Fred F. Finklehoffe; Winston O'Keefe; William Sackheim
- Editor: Cole Trapnell
- Camera setup: Single-camera
- Running time: 24–25 minutes
- Production companies: Four Star Television (1957–1958); Screen Gems (1958–1960)

Original release
- Network: NBC
- Release: September 30, 1957 – May 23, 1960

Related
- The Alcoa Hour; Alcoa Premiere

Alcoa Theatre is a half-hour American anthology series sponsored by the Alcoa Corporation and telecast on NBC at 9:30 pm on Monday nights from September 30, 1957 to May 23, 1960. For its first four months on the air, the title Turn of Fate was used as an umbrella title for Alcoa Theatre and its alternate-week counterpart, Goodyear Theatre.

In 1955, The Alcoa Hour premiered in a one-hour format aired on Sunday nights, but it was reduced to 30 minutes, retitled Alcoa Theatre, and moved to Monday evening in 1957. The show employed an alternating rotating company of actors: David Niven, Robert Ryan, Jane Powell, Jack Lemmon and Charles Boyer during its initial season. They did not return in 1958, "and the program became a true anthology once again".

== Overview ==
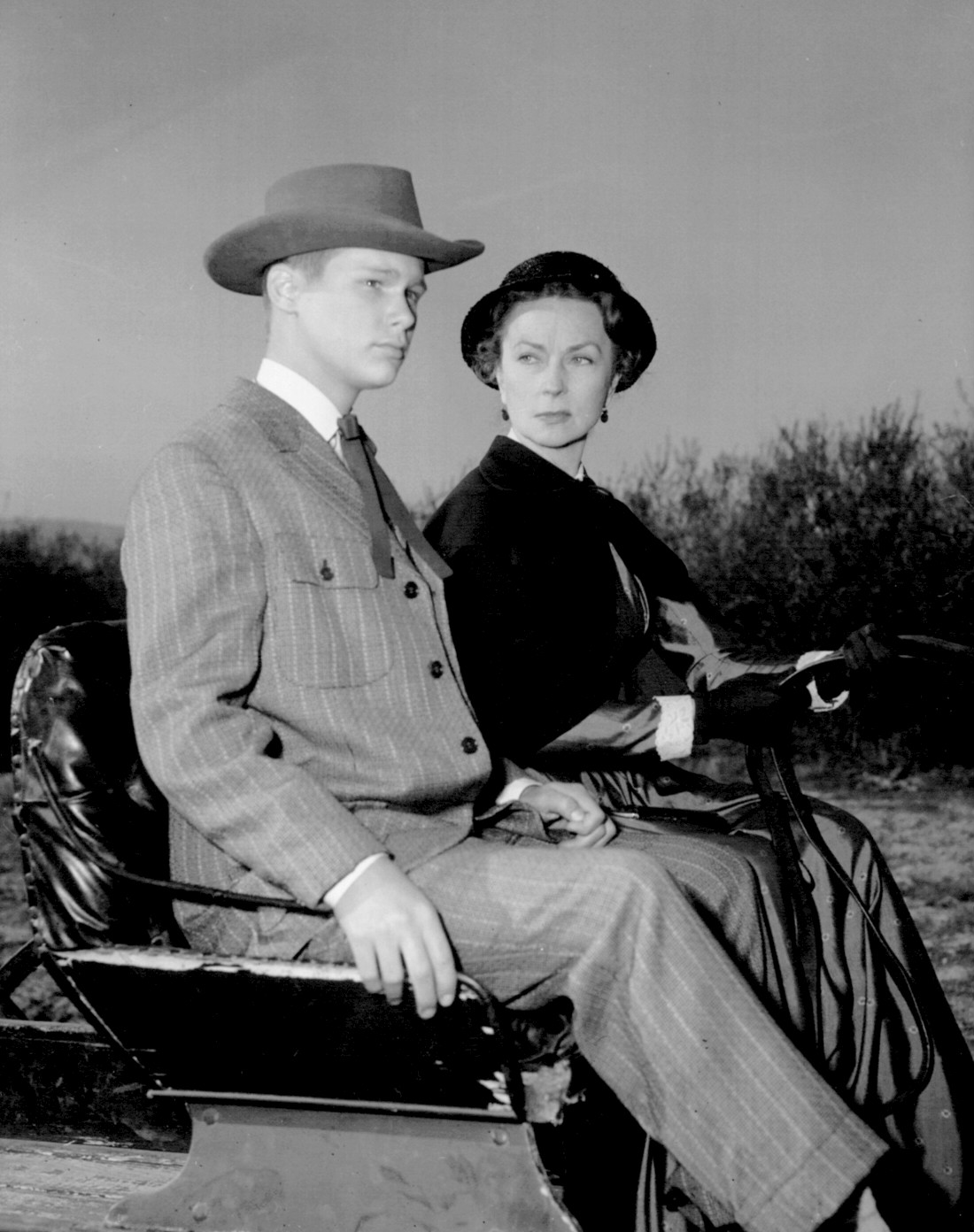
Brandon deWilde and Agnes Moorehead in "Man of His House" (1959)

The series continued to feature the talents of veteran and emerging actors over the ensuing years, including Cliff Robertson, John Cassavetes, Brandon deWilde, Cornel Wilde, Agnes Moorehead, Jack Carson, Walter Slezak and Gary Merrill. Child actor Flip Mark made his television debut as Robbie Adams in the 1959 episode "Another Day Another Dollar".

"333 Montgomery" (June 13, 1960) starred DeForest Kelley in the pilot episode of an unsold series written by Gene Roddenberry. It was based on the book Never Plead Guilty by San Francisco criminal lawyer Jake Ehrlich. Kelley acted in three separate pilots for Columbia, and the studio decided to try him in a lead and sent him to meet Roddenberry. Kelley and Roddenberry went to San Francisco to meet Ehrlich, who chose him for the lead.

Jack Lemmon, William Talman and Joan Blackman starred in "The Victim," a suspense episode involving a disappearing woman.

== Awards and nominations ==
Year	Result	Award	Category	Recipient	Episode
1959	Nominated	Emmy Award	Best Writing of a Single Program of a Dramatic Series - Less Than One Hour	Christopher Knopf	"The Loudmouth"
1959	Nominated	Emmy Award	Best Single Performance by an Actor	Mickey Rooney	"Eddie"
1959	Won	Emmy Award	Best Writing of a Single Program of a Dramatic Series - Less Than One Hour	Alfred Brenner and Ken Hughes	"Eddie"
1959	Won	Emmy Award	Best Dramatic Series - Less Than One Hour		
1959	Won	Emmy Award	Best Direction of a Single Program of a Dramatic Series - Less Than One Hour	Jack Smight	"Eddie"

== Episodes ==
=== Series overview ===
Season	Episodes	Season premiere	Season Finale
1	39	September 30, 1957	June 23, 1958
2	37	September 22, 1958	June 15, 1959
3	37	September 14, 1959	May 23, 1960

=== Season 1 (1957-58) ===
No. in series	No. in season	Title	Original release date
1	1	"Silhouette of a Killer"	September 30, 1957
2	2	"Circumstantial"	October 7, 1957
3	3	"Lost and Found"	October 14, 1957
4	4	"Encounter on a Second-Class Coach"	October 21, 1957
5	5	"Danger by Night"	October 28, 1957
6	6	"Guests for Dinner"	November 4, 1957
7	7	"Voices in the Fog"	November 11, 1957
8	8	"On Edge"	November 18, 1957
9	9	"Hurricane"	November 25, 1957
10	10	"Souvenir"	December 2, 1957
11	11	"The Crowd Pleaser"	December 9, 1957
12	12	"Cupid Wore a Badge"	December 16, 1957
13	13	"The Tinhorn"	December 23, 1957
14	14	"The Face of Truth"	December 30, 1957
15	15	"The Victim"	January 6, 1958
16	16	"In the Dark"	January 13, 1958
17	17	"The Fatal Charm"	January 20, 1958
18	18	"Hidden Witness"	January 27, 1958
19	19	"Music in the Night"	February 3, 1958
20	20	"The Caller"	February 10, 1958
21	21	"The White Flag"	February 17, 1958
22	22	"The Days of November"	February 24, 1958
23	23	"Most Likely to Succeed"	March 3, 1958
24	24	"Even a Thief Can Dream"	March 10, 1958
25	25	"The Seventh Letter"	March 17, 1958
26	26	"Taps For Jeffrey"	March 31, 1958
27	27	"Loudmouth"	April 7, 1958
28	28	"A Frame For Mourning"	April 14, 1958
29	29	"My Wife's Next Husband"	April 21, 1958
30	30	"The Giant Step"	April 28, 1958
31	31	"Most Likely to Succeed"	May 5, 1958
32	32	"The Lady Takes a Stand"	May 12, 1958
33	33	"The Perfectionist"	May 19, 1958
34	34	"Decision by Terror"	May 26, 1958
35	35	"The Clock Strikes 12"	June 2, 1958
36	36	"Disappearance"	June 9, 1958
37	37	"Johnny Risk"	June 16, 1958
38	38	"Three Years Dark"	June 23, 1958
39	39	"Decoy Duck"	June 30, 1958

=== Season 2 (1958-59) ===
No. in series	No. in season	Title	Original release date
40	1	"The Chain and the River"	September 22, 1958
41	2	"The Town Budget"	September 28, 1958
42	3	"Strange Occurrences at Rokesay"	October 7, 1958
43	4	"Lazarus Walks Again"	October 13, 1958
44	5	"Coast to Coast"	October 20, 1958
45	6	"Office Party"	October 27, 1958
46	7	"The Spy"	November 3, 1958
47	8	"Guy In Ward 4"	November 10, 1958
48	9	"Eddie"	November 17, 1958
49	10	"The First Star"	November 24, 1958
50	11	"The Reward"	December 1, 1958
51	12	"Points Beyond"	December 8, 1958
52	13	"Curtain Call"	December 15, 1958
53	14	"The Dark File"	December 22, 1958
54	15	"Coogan's Award"	December 29, 1958
55	16	"High Class Type of Mongrel"	January 5, 1959
56	17	"The Afternoon Beast"	January 12, 1959
57	18	"A London Affair"	January 19, 1959
58	19	"30 Pieces of Silver"	January 26, 1959
59	20	"Goodbye Johnny"	February 2, 1959
60	21	"Success Story"	February 9, 1959
61	22	"Corporal Hardy"	February 16, 1959
62	23	"A Good Name"	February 23, 1959
63	24	"Man of His House"	March 2, 1959
64	25	"Of Missing Persons"	March 9, 1959
65	26	"A Sword For Marius"	March 30, 1959
66	27	"Ten Miles to Doomsday"	April 6, 1959
67	28	"The Obenauf Story"	April 13, 1959
68	29	"Girls About Town"	April 20, 1959
69	30	"A Light in the Fruit Closet"	April 27, 1959
70	31	"The Slightly Fallen Angel"	May 4, 1959
71	32	"I Remember Caviar"	May 11, 1959
72	33	"Boydon vs. Bunty (Dear Mom, Dear Dad)"	May 18, 1959
73	34	"Wait Til Spring"	May 25, 1959
74	35	"Medals For Harry"	June 1, 1959
75	36	"Christabel"	June 8, 1959
76	37	"The Best Way to Go"	June 15, 1959

=== Season 3 (1959-60) ===
No. in series	No. in season	Title	Original release date
77	1	"Another Day, Another Dollar"	September 21, 1959
78	2	"Operation Spark"	October 5, 1959
79	3	"Day The Devil Hid"	November 2, 1959
80	4	"Small Bouquet"	November 16, 1959
81	5	"Shadow of Evil"	November 30, 1959
82	6	"The Long House on Avenue A"	December 14, 1959

Additional episodes in this season:

- "Action Off Screen" - January 11, 1960
- "Chinese Finale" - March 7, 1960
- "The Glorious 4th" - April 4, 1960

== Production ==
Alcoa Theatre was produced on film. By Four Star Films Incorporated at RKO-Pathe Studio in Culver City, California. Robert Fellows was the producer.
