= Joan Blackman =

American actress (1938–2026)

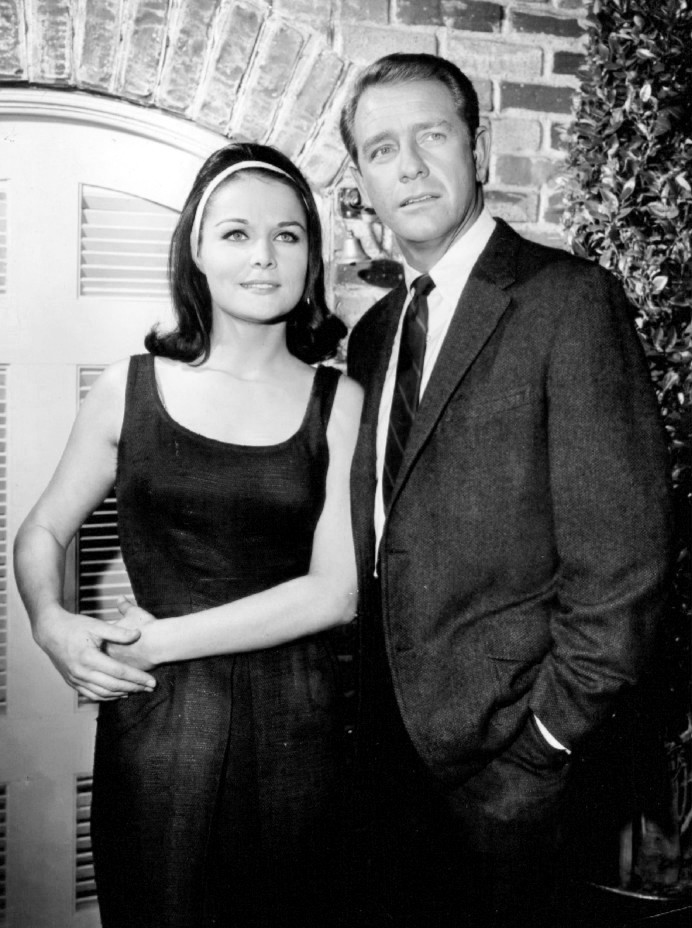
- Blackman and Richard Crenna in Slattery's People, 1965
- Born: May 17, 1938; San Francisco, California, U.S.
- Died: March 16, 2026 (aged 87); Santa Rosa, California, U.S.
- Occupation: Actress
- Years active: 1957–1975
- Spouses: Joby Baker (m. 1959; div. 1961) Rockne Tarkington (m. 1968; div. 1970)
- Children: 2

Joan Blackman (May 17, 1938 – March 16, 2026) was an American actress.

== Early years ==
Blackman was born in San Francisco, California on May 17, 1938, the daughter of Mr. and Mrs. Frank Blackman. Her father was a bass player in a musical trio. She sang at the California State Fair when she was 10 years old. By age 14, she had recorded with name bands and was featured as a singer on a weekly television program. Each week, she performed at military camps in the San Francisco area, and once each month she entertained at Letterman Army Hospital. She took lessons in singing, ballet, modern dancing, and tap dancing. She attended Abraham Lincoln High School. graduating in 1956. During her high school years, she sang on weekends with Ernie Heckscher's orchestra at the Fairmont Hotel in San Francisco.

After winning a beauty contest, Blackman went to Los Angeles on a modeling assignment. While there, she signed with an agent, which led to her first film contract.

== Film ==
In December 1956, Blackman signed a seven-year contract with the Hecht-Hill-Lancaster film production company. She studied with a drama coach during the time of that contract.

Blackman appeared in her first motion picture, Good Day for a Hanging, in 1959. She had significant roles in two Elvis Presley films: she played Maile Duval in the 1961 film Blue Hawaii, and the following year played Rose Grogan in Kid Galahad. She also appeared with Dean Martin in Career (1959), and played Ellen Spelding, the love interest of Kreton, the character of Jerry Lewis in Visit to a Small Planet (1960). Her other film appearances included roles in The Great Impostor (1961), Twilight of Honor (1963), Daring Game (1968), Pets, Macon County Line (both 1974), and Moonrunners (1975).

According to the book Hollywood Surf and Beach Movies: The First Wave, 1959–1969, in 1985 Blackman played the mother in the Ray Davies film Return to Waterloo; but going by the end credits of the film, this is a confusion with British actress Joan Blackham.

== Television ==
Blackman made her television-acting debut as a guest performer in a 1957 series, Hawkeye and the Last of the Mohicans, but "her first TV dramatic role" and "the first acting assignment she's ever had" was in the "Disappearance" episode of Turn of Fate in 1958. Among her television appearances was her role as Hilary Gray in the 1964 Perry Mason episode "The Case of the Ruinous Road". She also made single appearances in Bonanza, I Spy, and Gunsmoke.

She was part of the regular cast of the primetime television serial Peyton Place during its 1965–1966 season. In that show, she played Marion Fowler, the wife of the district attorney.

== Personal life and death ==
In May 1959, Blackman married Joby Baker, a fellow actor she met in drama school. The couple divorced two years later, in November 1961. She then married actor Rockne Tarkington in July 1968. They had two children before divorcing in October 1970.

Blackman died at a hospital in Santa Rosa, California, on March 16, 2026, at the age of 87. She was living in the nearby city of Calistoga at the time of her death.
