= The Frank Sinatra Timex Show: Here's to the Ladies =

Video by Frank Sinatra
- Released: 2002
- Recorded: 1960
- Genres: Jazz; Vocal
- Length: 60:00
- Director: Richard Dunlap
- Producer: John Bradford

Frank Sinatra chronology
An Afternoon with Frank Sinatra (1959)	The Frank Sinatra Timex Show: Here's to the Ladies (2002)	Welcome Home Elvis (1960)

The Frank Sinatra Timex Show: Here's to the Ladies was a 1960 television special starring Frank Sinatra, Lena Horne, Mary Costa, Barbara Heller, Eleanor Roosevelt, and Juliet Prowse. The show was written by John Bradford and directed by Richard Dunlap. The Orchestra who helped make this show was Nelson Riddle and his Orchestra.

It was Sinatra's third special for ABC and Timex and was broadcast on February 15, 1960.

== Song listing ==
1. "Here's to the Ladies" - Frank Sinatra
2. "I've Got You Under My Skin" - Frank Sinatra
3. Timex Promotional Spot
4. "Ouvre ton coeur" (from Bizet's Vasco de Gama) - Mary Costa
5. "By Strauss" - Barbara Heller
6. "Ring the Bell" - Lena Horne
7. "Come Cha Cha Cha With Me" - Juliet Prowse
8. Timex Promotional Spot
9. "Lonely Town" - Frank Sinatra
10. "But Beautiful" - Lena Horne
11. "From This Moment On" - Lena Horne
12. Harold Arlen Tribute Medley: "As Long as I Live" / "It's Only a Paper Moon" / "One for My Baby (And One For The Road)" / "Ac-Cent-Tchu-Ate the Positive" / "Stormy Weather" / "Get Happy" / "Between the Devil and the Deep Blue Sea" - Frank Sinatra and Lena Horne
13. "My Heart Stood Still" - Frank Sinatra
14. "Yours is my Heart Alone" - Mary Costa
15. "Afraid of Love" - Barbara Heller
16. "My Heart Belongs to Daddy" - Lena Horne
17. "My Funny Valentine" - Juliet Prowse
18. Timex Promotional Segment
19. "High Hopes" - Eleanor Roosevelt
20. "To The Ladies" - Frank Sinatra
