= Juliet Prowse =

South African-American dancer/actress (1936–1996)

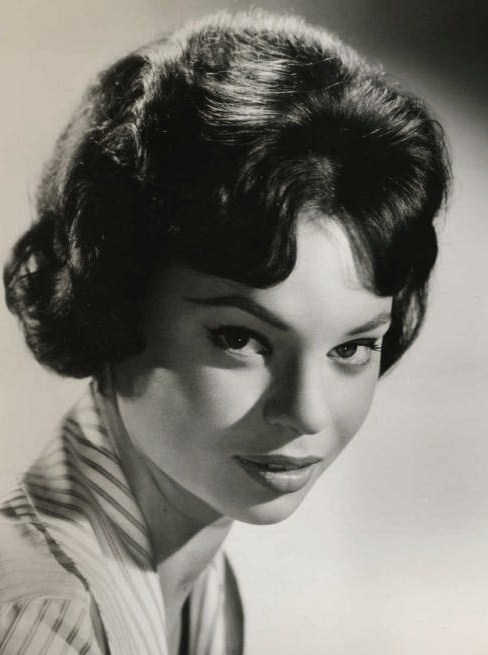
- Juliet Prowse in 1960
- Born: Juliet Anne Prowse; 25 September 1936; Bombay, British India
- Died: 14 September 1996 (aged 59); Los Angeles, California, U.S.
- Occupations: Actress; dancer; singer
- Years active: 1955–1995
- Spouses: Eddie Frazier (m. 1969; div. 1970) John McCook (m. 1972; div. 1979)
- Children: 1

Juliet Anne Prowse (25 September 1936 – 14 September 1996) was a British-American dancer and actress whose four-decade career included stage, television, and film. She was born in Bombay (today's Mumbai) then part of British India, and raised in South Africa. Known for her attractive legs, she was described after her death as having "arguably the best legs since Betty Grable".

== Early life ==
Prowse was born in Bombay, to an English father and a South African mother, Phyllis Donne. After her father's death when she was three years old, her mother returned with her to South Africa. She began studying dance a year later, at the age of four.

In her early twenties, she was dancing at a club in Paris when she was spotted by a talent agent and eventually signed to play the small role of Claudine in the upcoming Walter Lang film Can-Can (1960). She had already missed several opportunities to go to Hollywood due to existing contractual obligations, but eventually left a show in Spain in which she was starring to travel to Southern California to appear in Can-Can, which starred Frank Sinatra, Maurice Chevalier, Louis Jourdan, and Shirley MacLaine.

== Career ==
It was during the filming of Can-Can in 1959 that she captured the international spotlight. The Soviet Union's then–Communist Party leader Nikita Khrushchev, during his first American trip, visited the Los Angeles set of the film, and after Prowse performed a rather saucy exhibition of the 19th-century French dance the "can-can" for the Russian leader, he proclaimed it immoral. The ensuing publicity brought Prowse considerable attention in the United States. From there, her career accelerated, especially after her next film later that year, co-starring with rock and roll star Elvis Presley.

=== Film and television ===
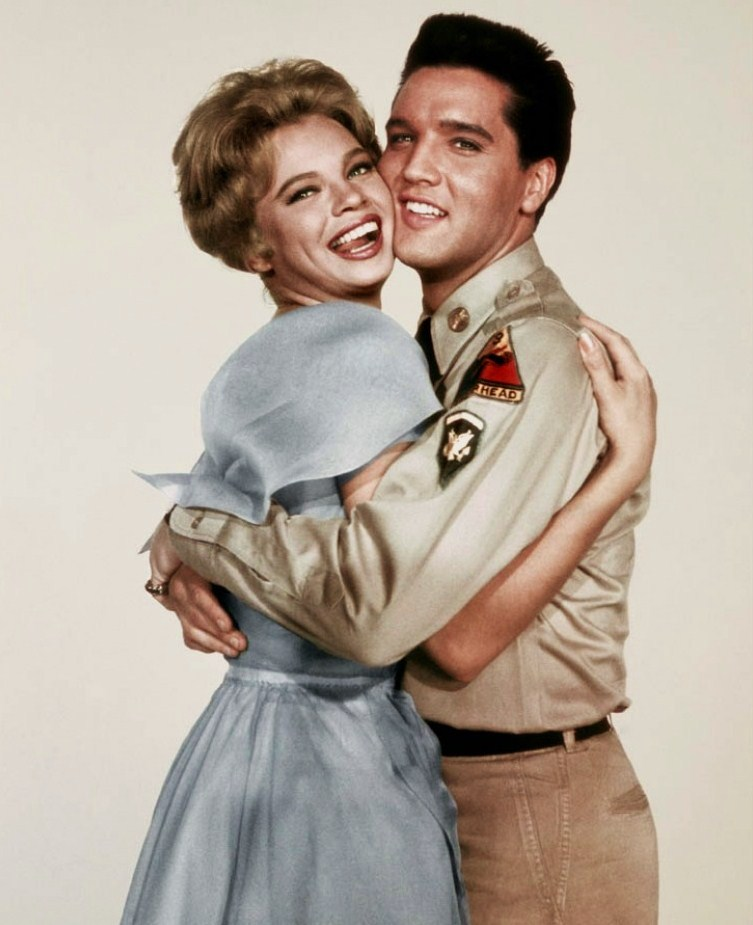
Juliet Prowse with Elvis Presley in G.I. Blues (1960)

Prowse met Frank Sinatra on the set of Can-Can when she was 23 and he was 43 years old. Time magazine did not rate the movie highly, but declared Prowse the best thing in it: "In fact, the only thing really worth seeing is Juliet Prowse, a young South African hoofer who puts some twinkle in the stub-toed choreography. And the only thing really worth hearing is the crack that Frank flips back at Juliet when she whips a redoubtable hip in his direction. 'Don't point,' he gasps. 'It's rude.'" She would also go on to appear with Sinatra and other notable guests such as Ella Fitzgerald, Peter Lawford, Hermione Gingold, the Hi-Lo's, Red Norvo, and Nelson Riddle and his orchestra on the December 1959 Frank Sinatra Show. She at times would sing in the chorus with other guests or Sinatra would sing to her.

Prowse's next major musical and dancing role was alongside Elvis Presley in his film shot partially in West Germany about his recent Army draftee experiences that drew world youth attention for two years in G.I. Blues (1960). During shooting of the film, they had a short and intense romantic fling mirroring the movie plot. "Elvis and I had an affair... We had a sexual attraction like two healthy young people, but he was already a victim of his fans. We always met in his room and never went out," she later described in an interview. Prowse also made a brief cameo appearance a decade later in the Metro-Goldwyn-Mayer documentary film, Elvis: That's the Way It Is (1970) as an interviewed audience member about to attend Elvis Presley's opening night show return as he restarted his concert tours and public appearances schedule after his 1960s feature film-making career lagged. It was held at the International Hotel (now the Westgate Resort & Casino) in Las Vegas on 10 August 1970.

She starred with Denny Scott Miller on her own brief NBC sitcom in the 1965–1966 season: Mona McCluskey, which was produced by George Burns. The series was based on the idea that the couple, Mike and Mona McCluskey, would live on his military salary, rather than her lucrative earnings as an actress.

Prowse also did other feature films, including The Fiercest Heart (1961) and Who Killed Teddy Bear? (1965) with Sal Mineo and Elaine Stritch.

Although her film and television career did not make her as big a star as predicted, Prowse had a rather philosophical way of looking at it. "Things generally happen for the best... I never worry about what happens in my career, because I can always do something else." Prowse would later go on to headline successful Las Vegas shows, commanding a very high salary. Stating that Las Vegas was the most demanding place she ever worked, she won Entertainer of the Year for the Vegas run of Sweet Charity. She would later show off her famous dancer's legs in a series of lucrative nationwide TV commercials for several advertisers, including L'eggs hosiery and Mannington Flooring.

Prowse was a guest in the first season of The Muppet Show.

In 1987, she was mauled by the same 80-pound leopard on two occasions: the first time while filming a scene for Circus of the Stars, then later while rehearsing a promotional stunt on The Tonight Show. The latter attack was more serious, requiring upwards of twenty stitches to reattach her ear.

Throughout the mid-1980s and 1990s, Prowse hosted the Championship Ballroom Dance Competition on PBS.

== Personal life ==
Prowse was living with actor Nico Minardos when Frank Sinatra invited her to join him in Las Vegas. She and Sinatra announced their engagement in 1962, which lasted only six weeks before the relationship ended. Prowse wanted to focus on her career and, shortly before calling off the wedding, she told celebrity columnist Hedda Hopper, "Frank wants me to give up the business," and stated that was a problem for her. Prowse later admitted, "I was as much flattered as I was in love. He (Sinatra) was a complex person, and after a few drinks he could be very difficult."

Prowse married Eddie Frazier, a dancer and choreographer, in 1969. The couple separated after eight months, and then divorced. She married actor John McCook in 1972, after the wedding had been delayed for five weeks when she gave birth to their only child, a son whom they named Seth, on the originally scheduled date. The marriage ended in divorce in 1979.

== Death ==
In 1994, Prowse was diagnosed with pancreatic cancer. In 1995, she went into remission and was well enough to tour with Mickey Rooney in Sugar Babies, but the cancer subsequently returned. Prowse died on 14 September 1996, 11 days before her 60th birthday.

== Filmography ==
=== Film ===
- Gentlemen Marry Brunettes (1955) as Specialty Dancer (uncredited)
- Can-Can (1960) as Claudine
- G.I. Blues (1960) as Lili
- The Fiercest Heart (1961) as Francina (A.K.A. ' No Right to Love ')
- The Right Approach (1961) as Ursula Poe
- The Second Time Around (1961) as Rena Mitchell
- Run for Your Wife (1965) as Jenny
- Dingaka (1965) as Marion Davis
- Who Killed Teddy Bear? (1965) as Norah Dain
- Spree (1967) as herself (documentary)

=== Television ===
- The Frank Sinatra Timex Show: Here's to the Ladies
- The Steve Allen Plymouth Show (14 March 1960)
- Adventures in Paradise as Simone (season 2, episode 6 "A Whale of a Tale")
- The Perry Como Show (12 November 1960)
- Remember How Great? (9 February 1961)
- The Bob Hope Buick Show (13 May 1961)
- The Kraft Music Hall (10 January 1962)
- Hollywood Melody (19 March 1962)
- Highways of Melody (22 April 1962)
- The Red Skelton Show as Daisy June (season 12, episode 2 in 1962)
- The Bob Hope Show (24 October 1962)
- Story of a Songwriter (1963)
- Burke's Law as Angel Crown /(2 episodes, 1963–1964)
- The Dean Martin Show (3 February 1966, and 14 September 1967)
- Mona McCluskey as Mona Carroll McCluskey (1965–1966)
- The Danny Thomas Hour as Aphrodite (1 episode, 1967)
- The Name of the Game as Aja Fowler (1 episode, 1968)
- The Carol Burnett Show in London (1970) (TV) as guest performer
- Second Chance (1972) as Martha Foster
- Tattletales as herself
- The Muppet Show as herself (1 episode, 1976)
- Match Game 77 as herself (5 episodes, 1977)
- Musical Comedy Tonight II (1981) (TV)
- The Love Boat as Samantha Bricker (3 episodes, 1979–1984), as Faye Marsh (episode 65 and 66, 1984)
- Fantasy Island (1 episode, 1983)
- Glitter (1984) (TV)
- Murder, She Wrote as Valerie Bechet (1 episode, 1987)

== Theatre ==
- Kismet (1955)
- Eddie Fisher at the Winter Garden (1962)
- Irma La Douce 1963, 1966 (Houston Music Theater), 1968
- The Boy Friend as Polly (1966)
- Sweet Charity as Charity Hope (1967; 1971)
- Mame as Mame Dennis (1969; 1990; 1994)
- Damn Yankees as Lola (1972)
- The Pajama Game as Babe (1973)
- I Do! I Do! as Agnes (1976, London)
- The Best Little Whorehouse in Texas as Ms Mona (1982)<Juliet Prowse BORN TO DANCE by Juliet E Prowse><Juliet Prowse BORN TO DANCE by Juliet E Prowse>
- Funny Girl as Fanny Brice (1984)
- Company as Joanne (late 1980s) <Juliet Prowse BORN TO DANCE by Juliet E Prowse><Juliet Prowse BORN TO DANCE by Juliet E Prowse>
- A Little Night Music as Desiree (late 1980s)<Juliet Prowse BORN TO DANCE by Juliet E Prowse><Juliet Prowse BORN TO DANCE by Juliet E Prowse>
- Follies as Phyllis (1987; 1988; 1990)Juliet Prowse BORN TO DANCE by Juliet E Prowse<><Juliet Prowse BORN TO DANCE by Juliet E Prowse>
- Chicago as Roxie Hart (1992) <Juliet Prowse BORN TO DANCE by Juliet E Prowse><>Juliet Prowse BORN TO DANCE by Juliet E Prowse
- Sugar Babies (1993-1995), second national tour (1984–85)

== See also ==
- List of dancers
