= Henry Garson =

American film producer

Henry Garson (31 March 1912, New York City – 29 May 2003, Los Angeles) was an American scriptwriter, producer, and playwright.

His notable writing includes the film G.I. Blues, starring Elvis Presley, as well as two Jerry Lewis films. He also wrote, directed and produced episodes for TV shows such as All in the Family and I Love Lucy. His stage play In Any Language was performed on Broadway and starred Walter Matthau.
