= The Flying Fleet =

1929 film by George W. Hill

- Theatrical poster
- Directed by: George W. Hill
- Written by: Frank Wead (story); Byron Morgan (story); Richard Schayer; Joseph Farnham (titles)
- Produced by: George W. Hill
- Starring: Ramon Novarro; Ralph Graves; Anita Page
- Cinematography: Charles A. Marshall
- Edited by: Blanche Sewell
- Music by: David Mendoza; Raymond Klages; William Axt
- Production company: Metro-Goldwyn-Mayer
- Distributed by: Metro-Goldwyn-Mayer
- Release date: January 19, 1929
- Running time: 87 minutes
- Country: United States
- Languages: Sound (Synchronized) (English Intertitles)

The Flying Fleet is a 1929 synchronized sound romantic drama film directed by George W. Hill and starring Ramon Novarro, Ralph Graves, and Anita Page. While the film has no audible dialog, it was released with a synchronized musical score with sound effects (e.g., engine noises, trumpet sounds) using both the sound-on-disc and sound-on-film process. Two United States Navy officers are rivals for the love of the same woman.

== Plot ==
The Flying Fleet (1929)

Six friends are to graduate the next day from the United States Naval Academy. They all hope to become aviators. When the officer of the day becomes sick, Tommy Winslow has to take his place, while the others go out and celebrate. Two return loudly drunk after curfew. Tommy is able to shut Steve up (by knocking him out), but "Dizzy" is not so lucky. An officer hears him and has him dismissed from the Academy.

The rest spend a year in the fleet, then reunite in San Diego for aviation training. Upon their arrival, they become acquainted with Anita Hastings. Tommy and Steve become rivals for her affections.

Specs is rejected for training because of his bad eyesight. The remaining four then head to training school in Pensacola, Florida. Kewpie panics on his first flight, forcing his instructor to knock him out to regain control of their trainer biplane, while "Tex" loses control during his first solo flight and crashes into the sea. Tommy and Steve pass and are promoted to lieutenant. Upon their return to San Diego, they are reunited with Specs, now an aerial navigator, and Kewpie, the radio officer of the USS Langley, the Navy's first aircraft carrier.

The romantic rivalry between Tommy and Steve takes an ugly turn when it becomes apparent that Anita prefers Tommy. Steve resorts to underhanded tricks, straining his friendship with Tommy. In retaliation for Steve hiding his uniform pants during a swimming outing with Anita, Tommy buzzes Steve on the airfield after a mock aerial dogfight he has won. The admiral is greatly displeased, and deprives Tommy of the honor of piloting a pioneering 2,500-mile (4,000 km) flight to Honolulu, awarding it to Steve instead.

Steve takes off, with Specs as his navigator. However, they run into a severe storm and crash into the ocean before the radio operator can report their position. All four of the crew survive and make it to the floating aircraft wing, but Specs is badly injured. The admiral, following in the Langley aircraft carrier, immediately orders an all-out aerial search. As the days go by, Steve and the others save the little fresh water for Specs, despite his protests; finally, while the others are asleep, Specs drags himself into the water and drowns himself. Meanwhile, the admiral is ordered to give up his fruitless search. Tommy pleads with him for one last attempt, and the admiral agrees. Tommy finally spots the survivors, but his engine conks out. He sets his aircraft on fire as a signal to the Langley and parachutes into the water. When they return to San Diego, Anita is waiting for him.

== Cast ==
- Ramon Novarro as Ensign / Lieutenant (j.g.) Tommy Winslow
- Ralph Graves as Ensign / Lieutenant (j.g.) Steve Randall
- Anita Page as Anita Hastings

Uncredited cast listed alphabetically:

- Alfred Allen as Admiral
- Wade Boteler as Shipwrecked crewman
- Bud Geary as Admiral's aide
- Sumner Getchell as Kewpie
- Gardner James as Specs
- Roscoe Karns as Shipwrecked radio operator
- Claire McDowell as Mrs. Hastings, Anita's mother
- Edward J. Nugent as Midshipman "Dizzy"
- Carroll Nye as "Tex"
- The "Three Sea Hawks" as Themselves

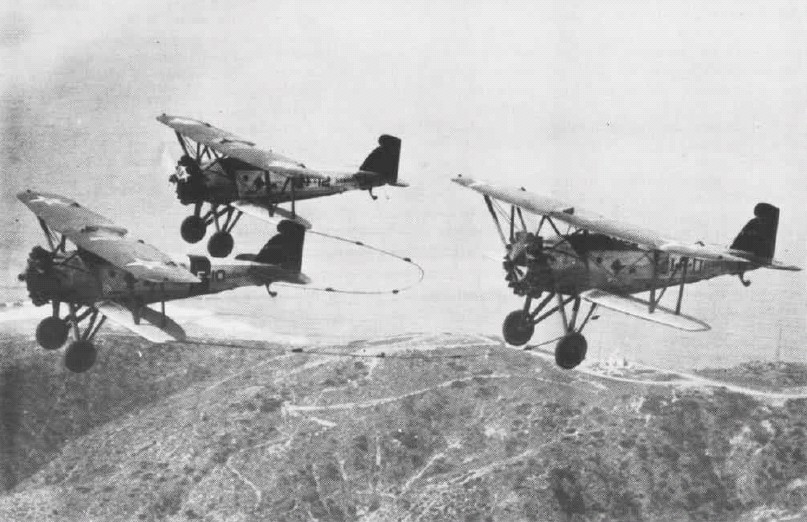
The "Three Sea Hawks"

== Music ==
The film featured a theme song entitled "You're The Only One For Me" which was composed by William Axt, David Mendoza and Raymond Klages.

== Production ==
The Flying Fleet was made with the cooperation of the United States Navy, with the note appearing in the opening credits: "Dedicated to the officers and men of NAVAL AVIATION whose splendid co-operation made this production possible." (Note: The term used in the credits was "produced with the sanction of the United States Navy.") The film was the first major Hollywood production to use Naval Air Station North Island. USS Langley (CV-1) appears in several scenes. The inclusion of the "Three Sea Hawks" aerobatic team was a highlight of The Flying Fleet. Drawing from VB-2B squadron at Naval Air Station North Island, San Diego, the team used three Boeing F2B-1 and F2B-2 fighters. Its first demonstration in January 1928 at San Francisco gave rise to a popular nickname: "Suicide Trio" although officially the team was called "Three Sea Hawks".

The film was the first from Frank "Spig" Wead whose story was the basis for the screenplay. He went on to write the screenplays of a number of naval and aviation-related films including: Dirigible (1931), Hell Divers (1931), Air Mail (1932), Ceiling Zero (1936), China Clipper (1936), Test Pilot (1938), The Citadel (1938), Dive Bomber (1941), Destroyer (1943), They Were Expendable (1945) and The Beginning or the End (1947).

The teaming of up-and-coming Anita Page and heartthrob Ramon Novarro was considered good box office. Page later recalled that Novarro was "... something to dream about. I mean he was so good looking."

Anita Page could not swim. The water skiing and swimming scenes were performed by a local girl, 18 year old Patricia Ingle of Coronado, Ca.

== Reception ==
The New York Times critic Mordaunt Hall wrote that "the story is sometimes quite a bit too melodramatic", but appreciated the "thrilling stunts" and "some splendid sequences devoted to an airplane carrier". Modern reviewer Dennis Schwartz agreed, stating, "the authentic looking plane stunts and test pilot sequences make the film a winner, as the tepid romance story flags."

== See also ==
- List of early sound feature films (1926–1929)
- List of media set in San Diego
