= Charles A. Marshall =

American cinematographer

- Born: July 21, 1898
- Died: January 8, 1985 (aged 86); Apple Valley, California, USA
- Other names: Chas A. Marshall; Charles Marshall
- Occupation: Cinematographer
- Years active: 1923-1945

Charles A. Marshall (July 21, 1898 – January 8, 1985) was an American cinematographer. He was nominated at the 16th Academy Awards for the film Air Force. He shared the nomination with Elmer Dyer and James Wong Howe. This was in Best Cinematography-Black and White.

He was known for doing early aerial photography.

== Filmography ==
- Souls for Sale (1923)
- The Flying Fleet (1929)
- Air Eagles (1931)
- Hell Divers (1931)
- Gold (1932)
- Sky Bride (1932)
- Night Flight (1933)
- West Point of the Air (1935)
- Men with Wings (1938)
- 20,000 Men a Year (1939)
- Dive Bomber (1941)
- Captains of the Clouds (1942)
- Air Force (1943)
- God Is My Co-Pilot (1945)
