= Air Force (film) =

1943 film by Howard Hawks

- Theatrical release half-sheet display poster
- Directed by: Howard Hawks
- Written by: Dudley Nichols
- Produced by: Hal B. Wallis; Jack L. Warner (executive producer)
- Starring: John Garfield; John Ridgely; Gig Young; Arthur Kennedy; Harry Carey
- Cinematography: James Wong Howe; Elmer Dyer (Aerial); Charles A. Marshall (Aerial)
- Edited by: George Amy
- Music by: Franz Waxman
- Distributed by: Warner Bros. Pictures
- Release date: February 3, 1943
- Running time: 124 minutes
- Country: United States
- Language: English
- Budget: $2,646,000
- Box office: $2.7 million (US rentals) $4,129,000 (total)

Air Force is a 1943 American World War II aviation film directed by Howard Hawks and starring John Garfield, John Ridgely, Gig Young, Arthur Kennedy, and Harry Carey. The film was distributed by Warner Bros. Pictures and produced by Hal B. Wallis and Jack L. Warner. It contains incidents of supposed fifth-column activities by Japanese Americans that never happened. (See Historical inaccuracies below.) Conceived by then-Lieutenant General “Hap” Arnold (Commanding General of US Army Air Forces) in the aftermath of the Pearl Harbor attack, it was originally scheduled for release on December 7, 1942, on the first anniversary. It became impossible to meet that deadline, and it premiered in New York City on February 3, 1943, and was released on March 20. The film's storyline revolves around an actual event that occurred on December 7, 1941. An aircrew ferries an unarmed 1940 series Boeing B-17D Flying Fortress heavy bomber, named the Mary-Ann, across the Pacific to the United States Army Air Forces base at Hickam Field. They fly right into the middle of the Japanese air attack on Pearl Harbor and the beginning of America's major involvement in the Second World War. An uncredited William Faulkner wrote the emotional deathbed scene for Ridgely, who played the commander and pilot of the Mary-Ann.

== Plot ==
On December 6, 1941, the crew of Mary-Ann, a U.S. Army Air Corps B-17D, is ordered to fly from San Francisco to Hawaii with eight other Flying Fortress bombers.

Master Sergeant Robbie White, the crew chief, is a long-time veteran whose son Danny is an officer and fighter pilot. The navigator, Lieutenant Monk Hauser Jr., is the son of World War I Lafayette Escadrille hero. The pilot is Michael "Irish" Quincannon Sr., the co-pilot is Bill Williams, and the bombardier is Tom McMartin. Sergeant Joe Winocki is a disgruntled gunner who, as an aviation cadet in 1938, washed out of flight school after he caused a mid-air collision in which another cadet was killed. Quincannon was the flight instructor who requested a board of inquiry into the accident.

Mary-Ann and the other B-17s fly fully equipped except for ammunition to Hickam Field arriving during the Japanese attack on Pearl Harbor. (Note: This is based on a true incident.) In its aftermath, the tired crew is ordered to fly to Clark Field in the Philippines via Wake Island, both also under Japanese attack. En route, the crew hears President Franklin D. Roosevelt ask Congress to declare war. Mary-Ann takes two passengers, fighter pilot Lieutenant Thomas "Tex" Rader and a small dog, "Tripoli", the Marines' mascot on Wake Island.

At Clark Field, White learns his son was killed in aerial combat. Mary-Ann attacks a Japanese invasion fleet, but is swarmed by enemy fighters and forced to abort after losing two engines. The fatally wounded Quincannon orders his men to bail out before blacking out. Winocki remains aboard and pilots Mary-Ann to a successful belly landing. The crew works feverishly through the night to repair Mary-Ann using parts from damaged B-17s as the Japanese Army closes in. Chester, the assistant radio operator, volunteers to fly as gunner in a two-seat observation plane. They are caught in an enemy air raid. Chester bails out after the pilot is killed, but is machine-gunned while descending in his parachute, then fatally strafed on the ground. Winocki and White shoot down the Zero fighter and then kill the pilot when he escapes the burning wreckage. The crew finishes repairs and refueling just as the Japanese overrun the airfield.

En route to Australia, with Rader as the reluctant pilot and the wounded Williams as co-pilot, they spot a Japanese invasion force below. The crew radios the enemy's position and circles until reinforcements arrive; Mary-Ann then leads the attack that devastates the Japanese fleet (this dramatic sequence mirrors the real events of the Battle of the Coral Sea).

Later in the war, a bombing attack on Tokyo is finally announced to a roomful of bomber crews, among them several familiar faces from Mary-Ann, including Rader, now a B-17 pilot. As the bombers take off, President Roosevelt speaks in a voice-over, as the air armada heads towards the rising sun.

== Cast ==
Actor	On-screen credit	Notes
John Ridgely	Pilot	Captain Michael Aloysius "Irish" Quincannon Sr.
Gig Young	Co-Pilot	Lieutenant William Williams
Arthur Kennedy	Bombardier	Lieutenant Thomas C. McMartin
Charles Drake	Navigator	Lt. Monk Hauser Jr.
Harry Carey	Crew Chief	Master Sergeant Robert "Robbie" White, also 2nd flight engineer
George Tobias	Asst. Crew Chief	Corporal Weinberg
Ward Wood	Radio Operator	Corporal "Minnesota" Peterson
Ray Montgomery	Asst. Radio Operator	Private Chester
John Garfield	Aerial Gunner	Sergeant Joe Winocki
James Brown	Pursuit Pilot (Passenger)	Lieutenant Thomas "Tex" Rader
Stanley Ridges		Major Mallory, Clark Field
Willard Robertson		Colonel at Hickam Field
Moroni Olsen		Colonel Blake, Commanding Officer at Manila
Edward Brophy (as Edward S. Brody)		Sergeant J.J. Callahan, USMC
Richard Lane		Major W.G. Roberts
Bill Crago		Pilot P.T. Moran at Manila
Faye Emerson		Susan McMartin, Tommy's sister
Addison Richards		Major Daniels
James Flavin		Major A. M. Bagley
Dorothy Peterson		Mrs. Chester (uncredited)
Leah Baird		Nurse #2 (uncredited)
Henry Blair		Quincannon's son (uncredited)
Ann Doran		Mrs. Mary Quincannon (uncredited)
Ruth Ford		Nurse (uncredited)

== Production ==
Boeing RB-17B portraying Mary-Ann as seen in the film.

Director Howard Hawks credited the concept of the film to Lieutenant General Henry H. Arnold, Commanding General of the Army Air Forces, loosely based on the experiences of an actual flight of twelve B-17s that left Hamilton Field, California, on the night of December 6, 1941, and literally flew into the war the next morning at Pearl Harbor. (The Japanese aircraft were detected by the Opana radar site on northern Oahu and reported to the Fort Shafter Intercept Center but was dismissed by the Watch Officer as being this flight of B-17s scheduled to arrive at Hickam Field around the same time as Japan's attack.) Executive producer Jack Warner was adamant that the film be ready for release by 7 December 1942, the first anniversary of the attack on Pearl Harbor. To that end, miniatures for battle sequences were filmed in May and June 1942, before completion of the script and storyline.

Although pre-production work had already been done, the official start of the production on 18 May 1942 was tied to the War Department's approving the script. Development of the film was concurrent with scriptwriting by Dudley Nichols, with some characters based on Air Corps personnel Hawks met while traveling to Washington, D.C., to confer with Arnold and the War Department Motion Picture Board of Review. Nichols's script, submitted 15 June, was 207 pages long (twice that of a normal feature-length film), had its initial 55 pages devoted to "character development," and was not finished.

Principal photography, consisting of aerial shots and exteriors, took place at Hendricks Army Airfield, Florida. For water scenes and shooting miniatures shots, MacDill Field, Florida; Randolph Field, Texas; and Santa Monica Bay, California, were used. Shooting began 18 June 1942, using a rented mock-up of a B-17 interior, in which the 10 principal characters performed for a month. The company then moved by train to Drew Army Airfield, Florida, at the end of July to spend the next month shooting aerial sequences coordinated by Paul Mantz, chief pilot and aerial technical coordinator (Note: The aerial technical coordinator was typically considered the "air boss". Besides flying, Mantz operated as a third director or assistant director on the staged aerial sequences.) for the production. Drew was selected because of fears that use of aircraft marked as Japanese might cause panic on the West Coast.

At the end of August, Hawks returned to Hollywood and engaged William Faulkner to rewrite two scenes, including the death of the Mary-Ann's pilot. By then, the film, scheduled to be completed by 17 September, was three weeks behind schedule and only half completed. Production featured a celebrated clash between producer Hal Wallis and Hawks over the latter's constant changing of dialogue as scenes were shot. Hawks was briefly replaced on 4 October by Vincent Sherman, but returned from "illness" on October 10 to take back primary direction. Sherman remained as second-unit director to assist with completion of the film, which wrapped on 26 October 1942, failing to shoot 43 pages of script and 33 days over schedule, too late to meet its 7 December release date.

Wallis wrote that AAF Captains Sam P. Triffy and Hewett T. Wheless were technical advisors to the film, and that Triffy in particular made significant contributions to the storyline, dialogue, and sets. "Shorty" Wheless had previously been a B-17 aircraft commander in the Philippines with the 19th Bomb Group and had been one of the survivors evacuated to Australia in December 1941. He was at Randolph Field, Texas, in the process of appearing as himself in the Academy Award-winning short film Beyond the Line of Duty when he assisted on Air Force. (Note: Wheless rose to the rank of lieutenant general and was Assistant Vice Chief of Staff of the Air Force at the time of his retirement in 1968.)

=== Aircraft ===
The U.S. Army Air Forces provided the various aircraft that appear in the film:

- Ten Boeing B-17B/C/D Flying Fortresses were from Hendricks Army Airfield at Sebring, Florida. The majority were actually RB-17Bs upgraded to B-17C/D standards, as was the B-17 that portrayed Mary-Ann. The bomber's on-screen, "wartime security" serial number 05564 (actually "40-5564") is listed in the film credits. The bomber's actual serial number was 8584 ("38-584"), being so marked on the left side of the vertical tail. In the film's beginning stock footage flight ĺine sequence, an early model YB-17 can be seen in the background of the bomber lineup.
- North American AT-6 Texans and Republic P-43 Lancers were painted as Japanese fighters.
- Bell P-39 Airacobras and Curtiss P-40C Warhawks from Drew Army Airfield portrayed the AAF fighters.
- Six Martin B-26C Marauders from MacDill Field were painted as Japanese bombers.

The "real" Mary-Ann was reported lost in the Pacific shortly after production wrapped, according to information attributed to the production's technical advisor; actually, no early Flying Fortresses served for long in Pacific combat after Pearl Harbor. Two early RB-17B aircraft, upgraded to the later series "D" standards, played the Mary-Ann; AAF serial numbers 38-584 and 39-10 (briefly seen in background projection as John Garfield boards the aircraft) were reclassified in late 1943 as instructional air frames; following the war, both were scrapped in January 1946. (Note: Stills from the film have indicated that RB-17B 38-269 may have actually played Mary-Ann.) Another claim, attributed to a newspaper article, was that the real Mary-Ann went on tour to promote the film, then was assigned to Hobbs Army Air Field, New Mexico, then later to Amarillo Army Air Field, where it was assigned to a ground school.

== Historical inaccuracies ==
The basic premise of Air Force, that a flight of B-17s flying to reinforce the defense of the Philippines flies into the attack on Pearl Harbor, reflects actual events. From that point on, however, all of the incidents are fictitious. The actual number of B-17s arriving at Hickam Field (Oahu) was 12, and their actual emergency landing sites were all on Oahu. No B-17 reinforcements reached the Philippines; the survivors of those already based there were withdrawn to Australia less than two weeks after the war began. The major bombing mission depicted at the film's climax most closely resembles the Battle of the Coral Sea five months later. Miniature shooting for its battle scenes was filmed in May and June 1942, concurrent but probably coincidental with Coral Sea and the Battle of Midway.

Anti-Japanese propaganda in the film included staged scenes in which the aircrew is forced to land on Maui Island and are shot at by "local Japanese". This never happened. There is a later assertion by the Hickam Field commander that local vegetable trucks from Honolulu knocked the tails off parked P-40 fighters as the attack began. Also, Lieutenant Rader claims that a Japanese civilian blocked the road in front of his car, as he hurried to the airfield, and then shot at him with a shotgun. As detailed in Walter Lord's book Day of Infamy, later investigations proved that no Japanese-American was involved in any kind of fifth column sabotage during the Pearl Harbor attack or later.

In “Air Force”, when departing the emergency landing field on Maui for Hickam Field, Sgt Winocki tells the other crew members that he's only the “tail-gunner” (32:00), but a tail gun is not installed on the “Mary-Ann” until one is improvised by Winocki in the Philippines several days later. (This could be attributed to the sequence of filming scenes.) The Flying Fortress used in the film played the part of a 1940 Boeing B-17C; no early B-17s, series "A" through "D", were fitted with a tail-mounted machine gun at the factory. That feature was not officially added until Boeing rolled out its heavily redesigned B-17E series. In the film, however, a member of the Mary-Ann's aircrew makes an improvised field modification, removing the tail cone and creating a manned, single machine gun position. In real life, some aircrews did install a broomstick painted black in the clear tail cone to discourage attacks from the rear. As detailed in Herbert S. Brownstein's Flying Fortress volume The Swoose: Odyssey of a B-17, a few B-17D aircrews field-installed a remotely controlled (via a pullcord) .30 caliber machine gun in their tails.

In “Air Force”, the script implies that there is some US Army Air Force (USAAF) involvement with the defense of Wake Island when the Mary-Ann's pilots meet the wounded commander of the island's Air Force. The wounded commander (Major Bagley) names the pilots defending Wake with the crew of Mary-Ann claiming knowing these pilots, but Wake was defended by a Marine Corps Fighter Squadron VMF-211 and it would be safe to say the Air Force pilots of “Mary-Ann” would not know any of the VMF-211 pilots. Since this was a USAAF-conceived and -supported film, it seems the intent was producing a propaganda film intended to bolster the public's opinion of the Army Air Force along with recruiting efforts. The United States was still reeling from the attacks on Hawaii, Guam, Wake, and the Philippine Islands with little in the way of successes to mention.

== Reception ==
Critical acclaim followed the film's premiere. Air Force echoed some of the emotional issues that underlay the American public's psyche at the time, including distrust of Japanese Americans. In naming it one of the "Ten Best Films of 1943", Bosley Crowther of The New York Times characterized the film as "... continuously fascinating, frequently thrilling and occasionally exalting ...". Writing in The Nation in 1943 while the war was raging, critic James Agee was uneasy about the film: "The well-paid shamming of forms of violence and death which millions a day are meeting in fact seems of an order more dubious than the shamming of all other forms of human activity; so I cannot be sure how I feel about Air Force. It is loud, loose, sincere, violently masculine, and at times quite exciting. ... A few all but annihilating cut-ins of actual combat adequately measure the best of the fiction, and my own uneasiness about it." When viewed from a modern perspective, the film's emotional aspects seem out of proportion. Although it has been dismissed as a piece of wartime propaganda, it still represents a classic war film that can be considered a historical document. When initially released, Air Force was one of the top three films in commercial revenue in 1943.

Later reviews of Air Force noted that this was a prime example of Howard Hawks's abilities; "Air Force is a model of fresh, energetic, studio-era filmmaking".

Air Force placed third (behind The Ox-Bow Incident and Watch on the Rhine) as the best film of 1943 selected by the National Board of Review of Motion Pictures.

On Rotten Tomatoes, it holds a rating of 82% based on 11 contemporary and modern reviews.

According to Warner Bros. records, the film earned $2,616,000 domestically and $1,513,000 internationally.

== Awards and nominations ==
Air Force editor George Amy won the 1944 Academy Award for Best Film Editing, defeating his counterparts on Casablanca, For Whom the Bell Tolls, Five Graves to Cairo, and The Song of Bernadette.

Dudley Nichols was nominated for Best Writing, Original Screenplay; Hans F. Koenekamp, Rex Wimpy, and Nathan Levinson for Best Effects, Special Effects; and Elmer Dyer, James Wong Howe, and Charles A. Marshall for Best Cinematography, Black-and-White.

== Radio adaptation ==
Air Force was presented on Lux Radio Theatre 12 July 1943. The adaptation starred Harry Carey and George Raft.

== Home media ==
Howard Hawks' Air Force was released on DVD in 2007 by Turner Home Entertainment and Warner Home Video. The single DVD disc also contains the special video features: the Oscar-nominated Technicolor drama short Women at War, two Warner Bros. patriotic war cartoons, The Fifth-Column Mouse and Scrap Happy Daffy, and the drama's theatrical release trailer.

== In popular culture ==
An Air Force plot detail is loosely referenced in the film Pulp Fiction (1994) during Christopher Walken’s monologue playing Captain Koons. Koons recounts the story of boxer Butch Coolidge’s grandfather’s watch: Butch’s grandfather, facing certain death at the hands of the Japanese at the WWII battle of Wake Island, gives his watch to a gunner on an Air Force bomber by the name of Winocki.
