= Ralph E. Davison =

United States Navy admiral (1895–1972)

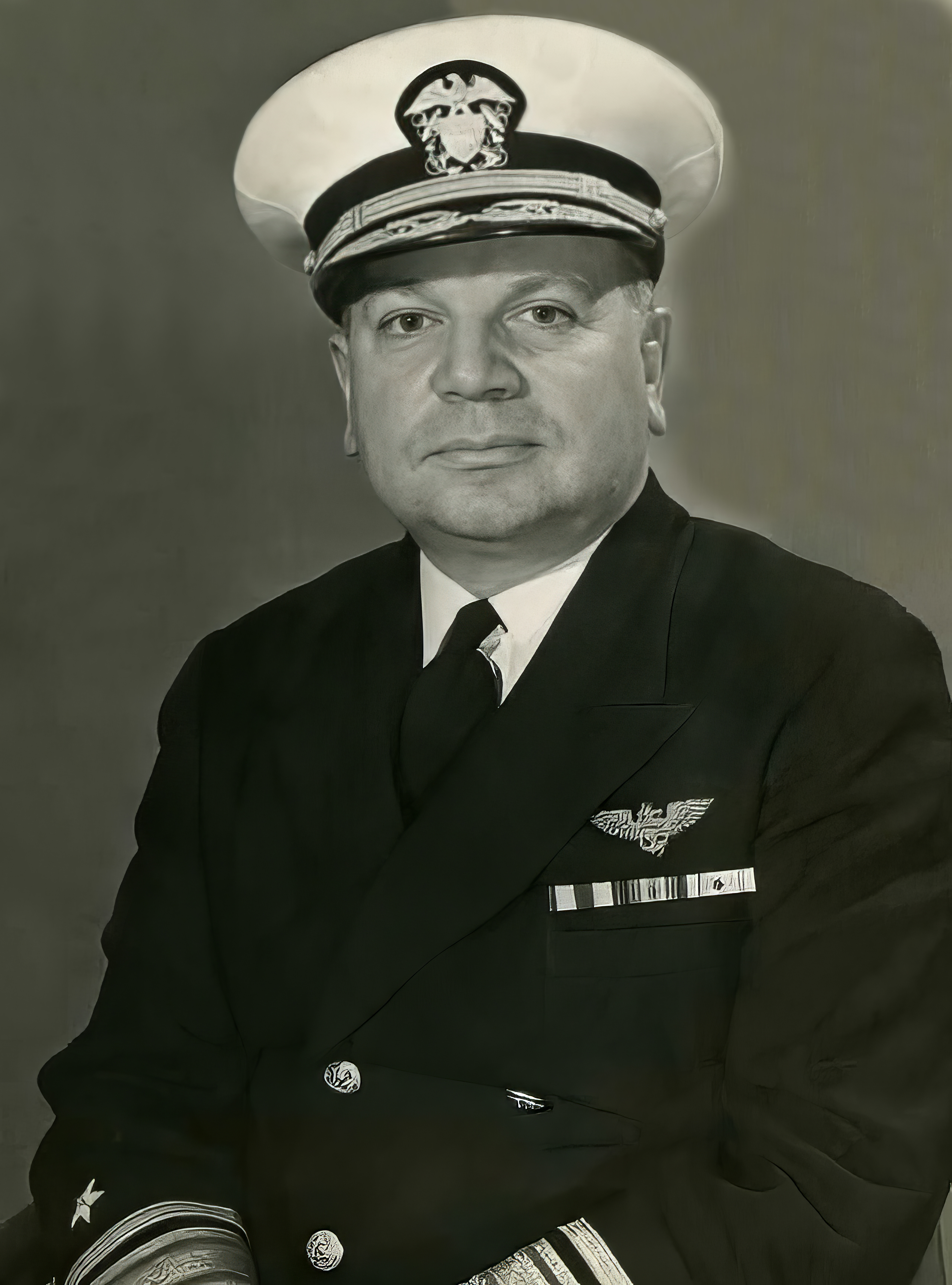
- Born: 12 September 1895; St. Louis, Missouri, U.S.
- Died: 13 February 1972 (aged 76); Pensacola, Florida, U.S.
- Military career
- Allegiance: USA
- Branch: United States Navy
- Service years: 1916–1948
- Rank: Vice Admiral
- Commands: Task Group 38.4; Task Group 58.2; Naval Air Advanced Training Command
- Awards: Distinguished Service Medal (2)

Ralph Eugene Davison (12 September 1895 – 13 February 1972) was an early United States Naval Aviator who later became one of Vice Admiral Marc Mitscher's Fast Carrier Admirals in the Pacific theatre during World War II.

== Early life and education ==
Ralph Davison was born and raised in St. Louis, Missouri. His parents were George Whittier Davison and Laura Maude Wilson. He attended the United States Naval Academy in Annapolis, Maryland, graduating in 1916.

== Career ==
In September 1919, Davison entered flight school at Naval Aeronautical Station Pensacola along with his Naval Academy classmate Frank Wead. Davison completed his flight training on 17 March 1920.

In May 1942, Davison was serving as the Assistant Chief of the U.S. Navy Bureau of Aeronautics. In October 1942, Rear Adm. John McCain replaced Rear Adm. John Towers as Chief of the Bureau. On 17 November 1942, Davison was promoted to rear admiral, but continued to serve as Assistant Chief of the Bureau into 1943.

Davison went on to command Task Group 38.4 during the Battle of Leyte Gulf in 1944 and Task Group 58.2 during the Battle of Iwo Jima in 1945. He was awarded two Distinguished Service Medals after completing these assignments. He was aboard his flagship USS Franklin when it was hit by a kamikaze during the battle of Leyte Gulf and again when it was hit by a dive bomber during an airstrike against Shikoku on 19 March 1945 in preparation for the invasion of Okinawa.

After leading TG 58.2, Davison was reassigned to Naval Air Station Jacksonville, where he led the Naval Air Advanced Training Command until July 1948. While there, Admiral Chester Nimitz asked Davison to select the first commanding officer for a new naval aviation demonstration squadron. Lieutenant Commander Butch Voris became the first leader of the Blue Angels in 1946.

Davison was promoted to vice admiral at the time of his retirement from active duty in July 1948.

== Personal ==
Davison was married to Elisabeth Dunham (14 April 1901 – 2 December 1971). They had a daughter, son and six grandchildren. Davison and his wife are buried in Barrancas National Cemetery in Florida. Their son David Dunham Davison (22 July 1928 – 13 May 2019) was a 1952 graduate of the U.S. Naval Academy.
