= John D. Price =

American admiral (1892–1957)

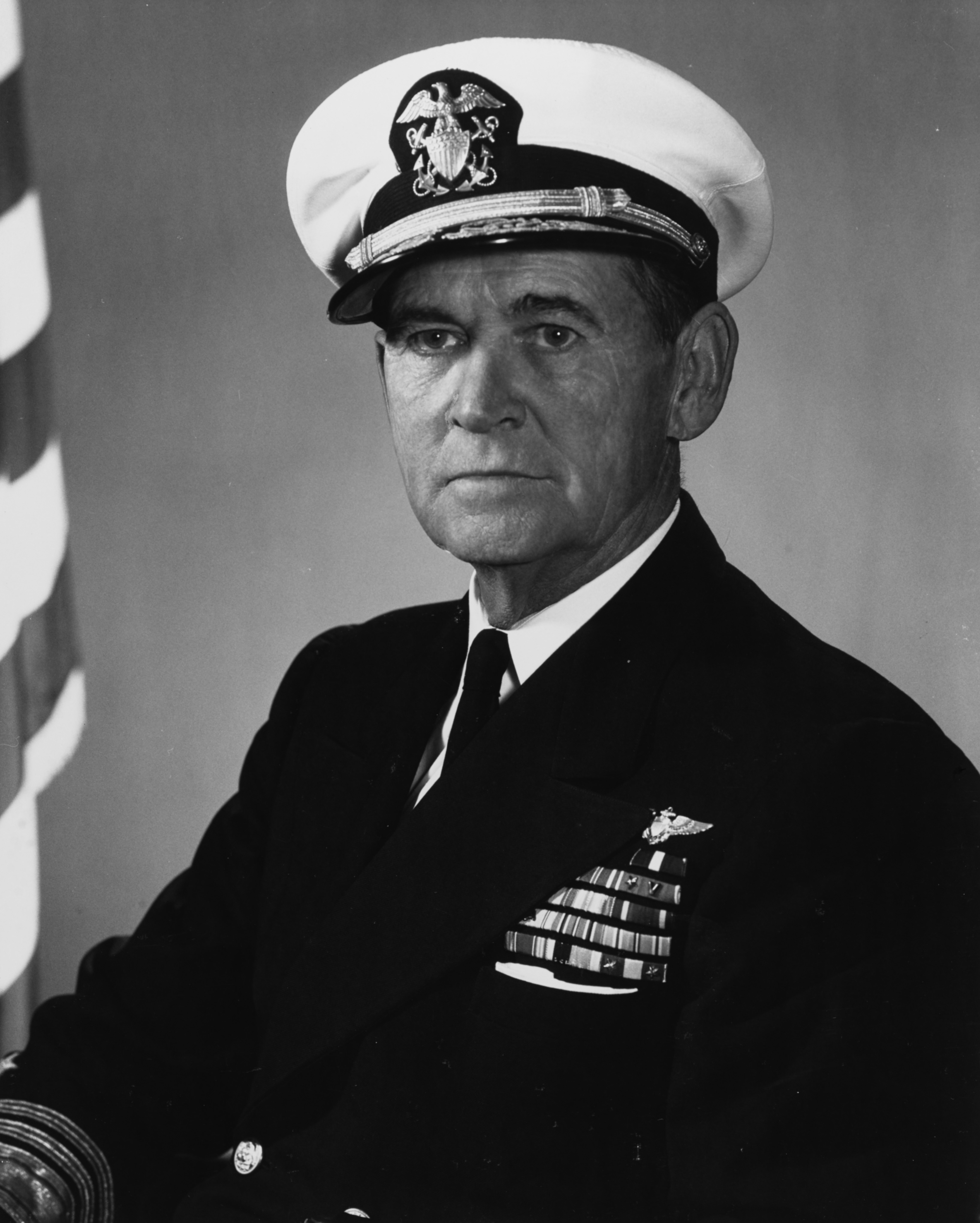
- Born: John Dale Price; May 18, 1892; Augusta, Arkansas, U.S.
- Died: December 18, 1957 (aged 65); San Diego, California, U.S.
- Military career
- Branch: United States Navy
- Service years: 1916–1954
- Rank: Admiral
- Conflicts: World War I World War II
- Awards: Navy Cross; Legion of Merit (2); Distinguished Flying Cross

John Dale Price (May 18, 1892 – December 18, 1957) was an admiral in the United States Navy who, early in his career, set many records as a naval aviator.

== Early life and education ==
Price graduated from the United States Naval Academy in 1916 along with his friend Spig Wead. In 1920, he was designated as a naval aviator.

== Career ==
Lieutenants Wead and Price set five world records for Class C seaplanes with a Curtiss CS-2 biplane on June 22–23, 1924 - distance (963.123 miles, 1,544.753 km), duration (13 hours, 23 minutes, 15 seconds), speed over 500 km (73.41 mph, 117.74 km/h), speed over 1,000 km (74.27 mph, 119.12 km/h) and speed over 1,500 km (74.17 mph, 118.96 km/h) - and again on July 11–12 - distance (994.19 miles, 1599.99 km) and duration (14 hours, 53 minutes, 44 seconds). Lieutenant Price is also credited with making the first planned night landing on a US aircraft carrier, on the USS Langley (CV-1) in a TS fighter biplane on April 8, 1925 (Lieutenant Harold J. Brow "stalled while practicing night approaches" and landed by accident on February 5).

He served in World War II, and at some point commanded Fleet Air Wing Two as a rear admiral. After the war, he served as commander of the Naval Air Forces in the Pacific from 1947 until 1948 and Vice Chief of Naval Operations for Air from 1948 until 1950. He was a "tombstone admiral", meaning he was promoted to four star rank upon retirement.

He died in 1957 at the Naval Hospital in San Diego. He was survived by his wife Miriam.

He was played by Ken Curtis in the 1957 film The Wings of Eagles, which starred John Wayne as Spig Wead. Price served as a technical adviser on the film. He also served as a technical advisor for the movie Mister Roberts.
