= Frank Wead =

American screenwriter (1895–1947)

Frank Wilbur Wead
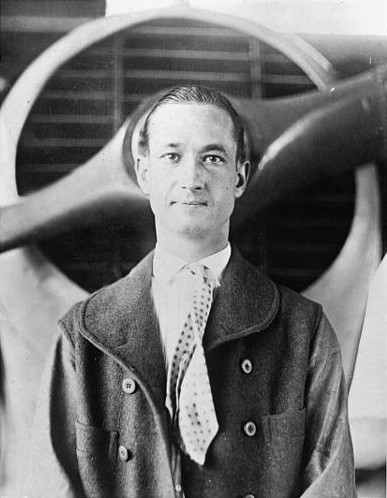
- Born: 24 October 1895; Peoria, Illinois, U.S.
- Died: 15 November 1947 (aged 52); Santa Monica, California, U.S.
- Spouse: Minnie Louise (Bryant) Hutchinson (m. 1916)
- Military career
- Allegiance: United States
- Branch: United States Navy
- Service years: 1916–26, 1941–44
- Rank: Commander
- Nicknames: Spig, Sparrow
- Other work: Screenwriter

Frank Wilbur (Note: His middle name sometimes appears as "Wilber") "Spig" Wead (24 October 1895 – 15 November 1947) was a U.S. Navy aviator who helped promote United States Naval aviation from its inception through World War II. Commander Wead was a recognized authority on early aviation. Following a crippling spinal injury in 1926, Wead was placed on the retired list. In the 1930s, he became a screenwriter, becoming involved in more than 30 movies. He also published several books, short stories and magazine articles. During World War II, he returned to active duty. He initially worked in a planning role, but later undertook sea duty in the Pacific, where he saw action against the Japanese in 1943–44 before being placed on the retired list in mid-1945.

== Early life ==
Frank Wilbur Wead was born to Samuel De Forest Wead and Grace (Bestor) Wead on 24 October 1895, in Ward No. 5 of Peoria Township, Peoria, Illinois. Frank graduated from Peoria High School.

The Wead family had a strong background of service to the American nation. The Weads of Massachusetts were represented in one of the Committees of Safety established during the American Revolutionary War, and also as patriots in the Colonial Wars, forming part of the General Society of Colonial Wars during 1607–1763. The Connecticut Weads were also patriots of the American Revolutionary War. The Wead families were prominent in Illinois and Vermont in several fields during the 19th and 20th centuries: politics, law, education and as supporters of the Union during the American Civil War, during which one branch of the Wead lineage became actively involved with the United States Sanitary Commission.

== Military career ==
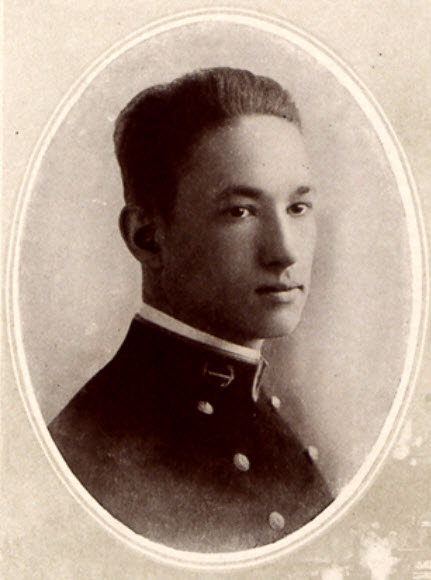
Midshipman Wead, United States Naval Academy, 1916

On 16 July 1912, Frank Wilbur Wead (aged 16) was admitted into the United States Naval Academy as a member of the Class of 1916. His classmates included John D. Price, Ralph Davison and Calvin T. Durgin. The Class of 1916 graduated on 29 May 1916.

Following graduation from the Naval Academy and leave, Wead reported to his first sea-duty assignment, USS San Diego, on 28 June 1916. He was a line officer with a date of rank as an ensign of 3 June 1916 and a precedence of 17 within his group of "running mates."

Wead was next assigned to USS Pittsburgh on a cruise from San Francisco, departing 25 April 1917. The ship reached Rio de Janeiro where, with several other officers, he departed Pittsburgh on 21 September. Wead was granted a temporary promotion to Lieutenant on 15 October 1917. He was booked for passage to the Port of New York aboard USS Zeelandia (ID-2507), which departed Rio de Janeiro on 25 September and arrived in New York on 17 October. Wead reported to the Bureau of Navigation, Navy Department, for sea duty orders.

Wead reported aboard USS Shawmut to assist in preparing the vessel for war. USS Shawmut departed New York Harbor in June 1918, and for the remaining months of the war operated in the area of the North Sea Mine Barrage. Following the armistice with Germany, Wead returned stateside aboard Shawmut, arriving at the Hampton Roads Naval Operations Base (NOB), Norfolk, Virginia, on 27 December 1918.

In February 1919, a kite-balloon division of six balloons was assigned to Shawmut and other ships. The ships participated in fleet exercises and, after seven weeks, returned to the United States after demonstrating the capability to operate without land-based support. With the knowledge that the Naval Aviation Division was seeking naval officers with a strong aptitude in naval engineering, having a desire to accept projects with a certain amount of risk, and with the combat-proven ability to lead naval personnel by example, Lieutenant Wead began the process for obtaining endorsements to his application to be nominated for flight training.

=== Naval aviation ===
Wead received a permanent promotion to Lieutenant (junior grade) on 3 June 1919 (as of 1 January 1920, he remained in the temporary rank of Lieutenant). In the late summer of 1919, Wead requested naval aviation flight training at Aeronautic Station Pensacola, Florida. His request was approved and he was assigned to Class 1 (the first class of regular officers sent to Pensacola after the commencement of World War I), on 15 September 1919. Wead reported to Pensacola and was billeted in a two-man room with Lieutenant (j.g.) Ralph Davison, a classmate at the Naval Academy. Wead was assigned to a training flight team with two other officers and former classmates, Lieutenants (j.g.) Robert Morse Farrar and Calvin Thornton Durgin. In addition to basic and advanced flight and navigation, the students were trained on a catapult installed on a barge at Pensacola. Wead was designated a United States Naval Aviator on 17 April 1920; his wife, Minnie "Min" Wead, pinned his golden wings to his uniform. On Saturday, 5 June 1920, Lieutenant Wead was appointed a naval aviator. Wead was promoted to Lieutenant on 1 July 1920.

Wead began to promote Naval Aviation after World War I through air racing, speed competitions and several naval aviation articles he submitted for publishing in the United States Naval Institute Proceedings magazine. This competition, mainly against the United States Army Air Service (and its leading racer, Jimmy Doolittle), helped push U.S. military aviation forward. These competitions would give naval aviation a much-needed spotlight in the public eye. The public attention that it generated helped push Congress to fund the advancement of military aviation. After World War I he was a test pilot for the Navy.

==== Sea duty ====
On 21 April 1921, a newly promoted Lieutenant Frank Wead reported aboard USS Aroostook, homeported at Naval Air Station North Island, San Diego, California. Aboard Aroostook, Wead was assigned aviation duties involving flying: Aeromarine 39-B (two-seater seaplane used as a "scout plane") and Felixstowe F5L (flying boat that carried a crew of four); reporting to Commander, U.S. Pacific Fleet Air Squadrons Captain Henry Varnum Butler, USN, and Executive Aide Lieutenant Commander Patrick N. L. Bellinger, USN.

Many changes were occurring within the naval aviation community. In the summer of 1921, Lieutenant Wead took part in the round-trip, long-distance flight operation involving twelve F-5-L flying boats departing from NAS North Island to the Coco Solo Canal Zone and back. Additionally, Wead took part in tests involving dummy torpedoes dropped from F-5-L aircraft. Also, in accordance with an Act of Congress, United States Secretary of the Navy Edwin Denby issued orders for the establishment of a Bureau of Aeronautics to begin operations, 1 September 1921, with newly promoted Rear Admiral William A. Moffett in charge. It was President Warren G. Harding who selected then Captain Moffett for nomination as the new Chief, Bureau of Aeronautics.

The experience gained aboard USS Aroostook involving F-5-L flying boats was instrumental in Wead being selected as commanding officer of Combat Squadron No. 3 (re-designated, Fighting Plane Squadron 3, on 17 June 1922), U.S. Pacific Fleet; he served in this capacity for over a year until the spring of 1923.

==== Naval aviation publicity and development ====
During the period of 1921–23, there was a great interest among state governors and congressional leaders to send Government aeroplanes to all parts of the country to participate in patriotic celebrations, municipal and state functions, conventions, air meets, including international air races. In an era of aeronautic cooperation and coordination with the taxpayers, the two services (United States Army Air Service headed by Major General Mason Patrick and the Bureau of Aeronautics headed by Rear Admiral Moffett) wholeheartedly approved at the 14th Annual Banquet of the Aero Club of America to compete for the Pulitzer Trophy (National Air Races), Mackay Army Trophy (Mackay Trophy), Collier Trophy, Wright Trophy, Larsen Efficiency Trophy, Curtiss Marine Trophy, Detroit Aviation Country Club Trophy, Liberty Engine Builders Trophy, Detroit News Aerial Mail Trophy, Inter-service Championship Meet, including the two foreign races – the Coupe Henri Deutsch de la Meurthe and the Coupe Jacques Schneider for seaplanes and flying boats.

In the spring of 1923, Wead was detached from the aircraft squadron battle fleet and reported to NAS Anacostia, Washington D.C., for assignment to the Flight Division of the Bureau of Aeronautics. Lieutenant Wead worked closely with the Philadelphia Naval Aircraft Factory and three contractors (Curtiss Aeroplane and Motor Company, Wright Aeronautical, Glenn L. Martin Company) in the development of seaplane airframes and new engines, and testing the seaplanes in duration flights above the Potomac River. Based upon his experience and technical expertise, Wead submitted several articles for publication that pertained to known issues concerning aircraft design, power plant problems, and future naval aviation.

==== Seaplane racing and records broken ====
Lieutenant Frank Wead traveled to East Cowes, Isle of Wight, Great Britain, as the American team captain of a small group of U.S. naval aviators. He was also the reserve team member. With Lieutenant Wead were four naval aviators who departed New York Harbor aboard S.S. Leviathan.

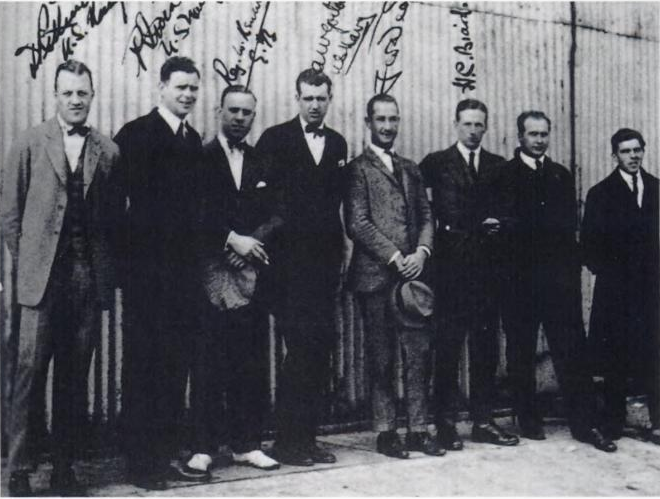
Winning team of the Seventh Schneider Trophy Contest: The American seaplane team adjacent to their hangar in Cowes seaport town, Isle of Wight (an island, English county and unitary authority in the English Channel, 2 to 5 miles off the coast of Hampshire, across the Solent). Those with their signatures listed would depart for the Port of Southampton and board S.S Leviathan (United States Lines; commander- Captain Herbert Hartly). The ocean liner departed Tuesday, 9 October 1923, stopped at Cherbourg and then arrived at New York Harbor on Monday, 15 October 1923.

They were to participate in the Seventh Schneider Trophy Contest (28 September 1923). Unfortunately, on the day of the navigability tests (27 September 1923), Wead had to withdraw because of an engine problem with his TR-3A aircraft- the American reserve seaplane. The TR-3A was a double pontoon seaplane with a Wright E-4 engine of 300 H.P. However, his teammates, Lieutenants David Rittenhouse and Rutledge Irvine, flying their CR-3s finished first and second places, respectively, on 28 September 1923. Their CR-3s were earlier tested at Garden City, Port Washington, Long Island. They were an improved adaptation of the Curtiss Navy Racer- the standard racing design which led the world in performance since the first plane of this type won the Pulitzer Race in 1921.

During the period 22–23 June 1924 just off-shore of NAS Anacostia, Wead and Lieutenant John Dale Price, using a Curtiss CS-2 with a Wright T-3 Tornado engine, set new Class C seaplane records for distance (963.123 miles), duration (13 hours 23 minutes 15 seconds), and three speed records (73.41 mph for 500 kilometers, 74.27 mph for 1000 km, and 74.17 mph for 1500 km). Lieutenants Wead and Price set a newer record 11–12 July 1924, with new Class C seaplane records for distance (994.19 miles) and duration (14 hours 53 min 44 sec) using a CS-2 with a Wright Tornado engine.

==== San Francisco to Hawaii flight ====
Following his assignment at NAS Anacostia, Wead was assigned staff duty involving flying at NAS North Island where he served as Flag Lieutenant to the flight project commander at NAS North Island, Captain Stanford Elwood Moses, USN. On 28 October 1924, Wead was assigned to command VT Squadron 2. During 1924 and 1925, Wead was involved with the planning for the San Francisco to Hawaii endurance and navigation tests to comprise two Naval Aircraft Factory PN-9 flying boats, and one Boeing PB-1 flying boat.

In early April 1926, Wead received a naval message at his headquarters, NAS North Island, that he was selected for promotion to lieutenant commander; promoted ahead of his fellow naval aviators Class of 1916; and, one of the Navy's youngest squadron commanders.

In his book "All the Factors of Victory: Admiral Joseph Mason Reeves and The Origins of Carrier Airpower" (May 2003), Thomas Wildenberg provided an insight into the naval aviation tactical issues with which Reeves was involved and the part Wead played as commanding officer of VF-2 fighter squadron (comprising Vought VE-7SF "Bluebird", Boeing Model 15 naval variant FB-5, Curtiss Model 34D F6C-2 "Hawk"). Wead was preparing his squadron for the June 1926 tactical exercises aboard USS Langley up to his accident on 14 April 1926. Wildenberg identified Wead's replacement as Lieutenant Commander Frank Dechant Wagner, USN. Assigned to Commander, Air Squadrons, Battle Fleet, Lieutenant Commander Wagner would further improve upon the training tactics devised by Wead, including developing new dive-bombing techniques with the Battle Fleet's Curtiss F6C Hawks and FB-5s.

=== Medical retirement ===
On 14 April 1926, Wead heard his daughter Marjorie crying. Rushing to her, he accidentally tripped, falling head first down a dark stairway, and fractured his neck. The injury resulted in paralysis. Wead was immediately taken to the U.S. Naval Hospital, Balboa Park (today's Naval Medical Center San Diego) where the Commandant of the U.S. Naval Hospital, Captain Raymond Spear, Medical Corps, was briefed on Wead's condition and ordered him to be operated on.

According to an article written by a San Diego Union staff writer:

"Lieut. Frank Wead Slips on Stairway of Coronado Home; Operated Upon. Lieut. Frank Wead, one of the best known aviators in the naval service, was operated on for a fractured neck at the naval hospital yesterday morning. Wead sustained the injury which came near costing his life when he slipped and fell from the top of the stairway of his home in Coronado late Wednesday night. The aviator had just moved into the home and was unfamiliar with the staircase. Physicians, following the operation yesterday, said that Wead will recover but it is doubtful if he will be able to fly again. Wead's outstanding exploit since entering the naval flying corps was his flight against British pilots in the international seaplane races off the Isle of Wight in 1923, when American naval fliers took all the honors."

On 16 July 1926, while convalescing in the hospital, Wead was promoted to lieutenant commander. At the encouragement of his fellow naval officers, he put his writing skills to work and started sending manuscripts to book and magazine companies. During spring 1927, in the hope that his recovery was imminent and with the strong recommendation from Commander Marc Mitscher, Rear Admiral Moffett submitted Wead's name to Rear Admiral Richard H. Leigh, Commander, Bureau of Naval Personnel, recommending Wead to be the new squadron commander of VF-6B (previously, VF-2) with duty aboard USS Langley. However, Wead was placed on the retired list, 28 May 1928, with a residence in the City of Los Angeles, California. He began his second career, screenplay writing, which subsequently occupied him throughout the 1930s and early 1940s.

=== World War II service ===
In the hours immediately following the attack on Pearl Harbor on 7 December 1941, from his personal library within his rented estate at 715 North Rexford Drive, Beverly Hills, California, Wead listened as bulletins interrupted regularly scheduled radio programs with updated details of the bombing. From his library, Wead also made a long-distance phone call to the Bureau of Aeronautics to speak with Rear Admiral John Henry Towers, requesting a recall to active duty. The phone call was followed up with a Western Union telegram to Captain Ralph Davison, USN.

It was a chance to serve his country again. Wead flew from California and arrived at Naval Air Station Quonset Point where he worked as special aide to Captain Ralph Davison. Also at NAS Quonset Point were Rear Admiral Calvin T. Durgin and his naval aide Captain John Madison "Johnny" Hoskins, USN. All these naval aviators communicated closely together in working out the details for the manning and training of carrier air groups for the newly commissioned aircraft carriers. With the approval from Ralph Davison, Wead was promoted to the temporary rank of commander in the US Naval Reserve, on 28 September 1942.

The story of Wead's sea duty during World War II began in the air, flying from Port of San Francisco and landing at Honolulu Harbor aboard NC18605 Boeing 314 Clipper Dixie Clipper, arriving at Oahu Island on 21 November 1943. From the Port of Honolulu, Wead reported to Commander in Chief Pacific Fleet Headquarters as head of the Plans Division for Commander, Air Force, Pacific Fleet, (now) Vice Admiral John Henry Towers. This shore-duty assignment was to await the return of USS Yorktown. On the afternoon of 9 December 1943, Wead reported aboard Yorktown where he met with his old Naval Academy buddy Captain Joseph J. Clark, USN, skipper of Yorktown. Representing the Plans Division, Wead's orders aboard Yorktown were to monitor and report on carrier aviation combat operations, most especially obtaining first-hand knowledge of the ability of consolidated CVs in a task force to readily replace their lost/damaged aircraft with replacements from close by CVLs.

Having completed an earlier successful operation, Yorktown (assigned to Task Group 58.1, commanded by Rear Admiral John W. Reeves, Jr., USN) departed Pearl Harbor with Wead aboard on 16 January 1944. Wead took part in the attack on Kwajalein Atoll during Operation Flintlock, an operation that involved four carrier groups. USS Yorktown then steamed to the newly established Pacific Fleet anchorage at Majuro Atoll, arriving about 4 February 1944. It was during this short eight-day anchorage period amongst the Pacific Fleet that Wead was transferred from Yorktown to a destroyer, and then to USS Essex. The commanding officer of Essex was Captain Ralph A. Ofstie, USN. While aboard Essex, Wead saw action against Truk Island (17–18 February), now called Chuuk, and against Saipan, Tinian, and Guam (23 February).

After these operations, Essex received orders for overhaul and Wead remained aboard Essex as it steamed to San Francisco Bay. The carrier arrived at Naval Air Station Alameda on or about 16 April 1944 for a much-needed overhaul. It was at NAS Alameda, aboard Essex (pier-side), that Wead was given an official send-off from active duty just prior to his retirement. Wead was relieved of active duty on 21 July 1944, and was processed through the Personnel Department at NAS Alameda, receiving his discharge papers and a train ticket for Los Angeles, California. Wead was placed on the retired list on 11 May 1945 with the rank of commander.

== Death ==
On 1 November 1947, Wead was taken for surgery at the Santa Monica Hospital, which was located at 1250 16th Street in Santa Monica, Los Angeles County, California. He died at the hospital on 15 November.

== Legacy ==
Admiral Calvin T. Durgin later described Wead as "a great man who did a remarkable job under very difficult circumstances."

In 1957, John Wayne portrayed Wead in the John Ford directed film The Wings of Eagles.

== Works ==
=== Naval ===
- "Naval Aviation Today," U.S. Naval Institute Proceedings, April 1924, Vol 50, No. 4

=== Short fiction ===
Following his release from Balboa Naval Hospital, Wead moved to a small home in Santa Monica where he wrote:

| Title | Date | Magazine | Volume |
|---|---|---|---|
| "Panama Liberty" | May 1930 | The American Magazine | 109 |
| "Crash Dive!" | July 1930 | Submarine Stories | 4 |
| "Control" | March 1931 | The American Magazine | 111 |
| "Sea Worthy" | April 1931 | The American Magazine | 111 |
| "Deal Me Out" | May 1930 | The Saturday Evening Post | 202 |
| "Gilroy and Son" | 6 September 1930 | The Saturday Evening Post | 203 |
| "Bluff" | 27 August 1932 | Liberty | |
| "Old-Timer" | 1 April 1933 | The Saturday Evening Post | 205 |

=== Books ===
- Professional questions and answers for naval officers, (Menasha, Wisconsin, George Banta Publishing Company, 1921)
- Airplane parts and maintenance, (Scranton, Pennsylvania, International Textbook Company, 1931)
- Wings for men, (New York, London, The Century Company, 1931)
- Types of aircraft and materials, (Scranton, Pa., International Textbook Company, 1931)
- History of aviation. Airplane details, with James Ross Allen (Scranton, Pennsylvania, International Textbook Company, 1935)
- Practical flying and meteorology, with James Ross Allen (Scranton, Pennsylvania, International Textbook Company, 1935)
- Dark Canyon, W. L. River and Frank Wead (Frederick A. Stokes Company, New York, 1935). 285 p.
- Our greatest story-teller; the story of talking pictures, (New York, T. Nelson and Sons, 1936)
- Gales, ice and men, a biography of the steam barkentine Bear, Frank W. Wead (New York, Dodd, Mead & Company, 1937)
- All about motion pictures, (Cambridge, England, published for the Orthological Institute by the Basic English Publishing Company, 1938?)

=== Stage writing ===
- Ceiling Zero

=== Screen writing ===
Frank A. Andrews's book Dirigible (New York: A. L. Burt Co. 1931), is based on the Columbia Pictures screenplay by Wead. Wead's publishers released another book in 1931. This was Wings For Men. Writing would become a second and even more important career for Wead, and a means of promoting naval aviation.

The injury to his neck left Wead with an ability to endure hours of pain sitting upright in a chair typing away on manuscripts for possible publication. He sent his daughter Dorothea to attend the prestigious Smith College; she graduated with the Class of 1939. Thus, Wead was able to succeed as a screenplay writer and to earn a comfortable income to support his daughters in their life-style and college education.

Wead's second unexpected career became far more important than his work as a pilot. His talent for writing grew during the years as a naval officer involved with the daily administrative papers, submitting detailed reports, completing flight schedules. One of his interests was reading stories and poetry written by Robert Louis Stevenson. Wead would later use the "Requiem" inscribed on Stevenson's tomb as script material for several screenplays, such as They Were Expendable, and screenplay writers Frank Fenton and William Wister Haines used the poem in the Metro-Goldwyn-Mayer film The Wings of Eagles.

The popularity of his pulp and magazine stories led Wead to Hollywood and the eventual friendship and collaboration with director John Ford.

=== Filmography ===
| No | Title | Year | Credit | Note |
|---|---|---|---|---|
| 1 | The Beginning or the End | 1947 | Screenwriter | |
| 2 | Blaze of Noon | 1947 | Screenwriter | |
| 3 | The Hoodlum Saint | 1946 | Original screenplay | |
| 4 | They Were Expendable | 1945 | Screenwriter | |
| 5 | Destroyer | 1943 | Story, Screenwriter | |
| 6 | Dive Bomber | 1941 | Story, Screenwriter | |
| 7 | I Wanted Wings | 1941 | Story | |
| 8 | Sailor's Lady | 1940 | Original Story | |
| 9 | Moon Over Burma | 1940 | Screenwriter | |
| 10 | Tail Spin | 1939 | Original Story, Original Screenplay | |
| 11 | 20,000 Men a Year | 1939 | Original Story | |
| 12 | The Citadel | 1938 | Screenwriter | Nominated for Academy Award for writing (screenplay) with two others |
| 13 | A Yank at Oxford | 1938 | Contr to scr const | |
| 14 | Test Pilot | 1938 | Original Story | Nominated for Academy Award for writing (original story) |
| 15 | Sea Devils | 1937 | Original Story, Screenwriter | |
| 16 | Submarine D-1 | 1937 | Story, Screenwriter | |
| 17 | The Woman I Love | 1937 | Contract Writer | |
| 18 | Parole! | 1936 | Contract Writer | |
| 19 | China Clipper | 1936 | Screenwriter | |
| 20 | Ceiling Zero | 1936 | Stage, Screenwriter | |
| 21 | Stranded | 1935 | Story | |
| 22 | Storm Over the Andes | 1935 | Screenwriter | |
| 23 | The Great Impersonation | 1935 | Screenwriter | |
| 24 | West Point of the Air | 1935 | Screenwriter | |
| 25 | Murder in the Fleet | 1935 | Screenwriter | |
| 26 | Alas sobre el Chaco | 1935 | Screenwriter | |
| 27 | I'll Tell the World | 1934 | Story | |
| 28 | Hell in the Heavens | 1934 | Contr to scr const | |
| 29 | Fugitive Lovers | 1934 | Original screen story | |
| 30 | Midshipman Jack | 1933 | Screenwriter | |
| 31 | Hell Divers | 1932 | Story | |
| 32 | Air Mail | 1932 | Screenwriter | |
| 33 | The All American | 1932 | Screenwriter | |
| 34 | Shipmates | 1931 | Cont | |
| 35 | Dirigible | 1931 | Story | |
| 36 | The Flying Fleet | 1929 | Story | |

== Military awards and certifications ==
- Naval Aviator Badge
- Legion of Merit
- Mexican Service Medal
- World War I Victory Medal
- Asiatic-Pacific Campaign Medal
- World War II Victory Medal
