= The Wings of Eagles =

1957 film by John Ford

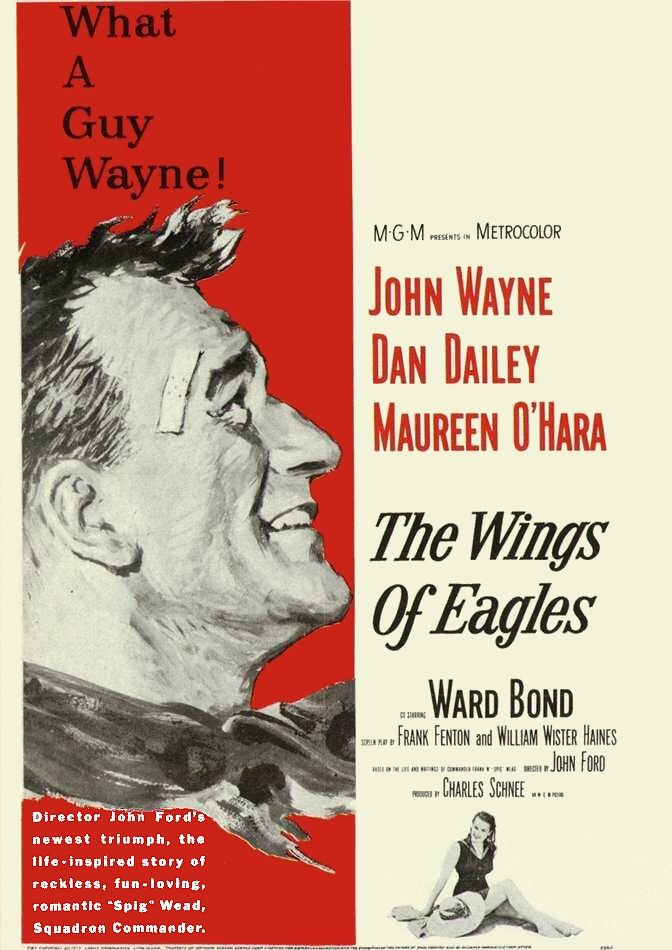
- Theatrical release poster
- Directed by: John Ford
- Screenplay by: Frank Fenton and William Wister Haines
- Based on: the life and writings of Commander Frank W. "Spig" Wead
- Produced by: Charles Schnee
- Starring: John Wayne; Dan Dailey; Maureen O'Hara; Ward Bond
- Cinematography: Paul C. Vogel. A.S.C.
- Edited by: Gene Ruggiero, A.C.E.
- Music by: Jeff Alexander
- Distributed by: Metro-Goldwyn-Mayer
- Release date: February 22, 1957
- Running time: 110 minutes
- Country: United States
- Language: English
- Budget: $2,644,000
- Box office: $3,650,000

The Wings of Eagles is a 1957 American Metrocolor film starring John Wayne, Dan Dailey and Maureen O'Hara, based on the life of Frank "Spig" Wead and the history of U.S. Naval aviation from its inception through World War II. The film is a tribute to Wead (who died 10 years earlier, in 1947 at age of 52) from his friend, director John Ford, and was based on Wead's "We Plaster the Japs", published in a 1944 issue of The American Magazine.

John Wayne plays naval aviator-turned-screenwriter Wead, who wrote the story or screenplay for such films as Hell Divers (1931) with Wallace Beery and Clark Gable, Ceiling Zero (1936) with James Cagney, and the Oscar-nominated World War II drama They Were Expendable (1945) in which Wayne co-starred with Robert Montgomery.

The supporting cast features Ward Bond, Ken Curtis, Edmund Lowe and Kenneth Tobey. This film was the third of five in which Wayne and O'Hara appeared together; others were Rio Grande (1950), The Quiet Man (1952), McLintock! (1963) and Big Jake (1971).

== Plot ==
Soon after World War I is over, Naval Aviator in training "Spig" Wead boldly tries flying a Vought UO-1 when challenged by an Army soldier, without yet having flight experience. Running out of fuel, he crash lands at the garden party he is meant to attend, halting in the pool.

Wead, along with John Dale Price, tries to prove to the Navy the value of aviation in combat. To do this, Wead pushes the Navy to compete in racing and endurance competitions. Several races are against the US Army aviation team led by Captain Herbert Allen Hazard.

Wead spends most of his time either flying or horsing around with his teammates, meaning that his wife Minnie, or "Min", and children are ignored.

The night Wead is promoted to fighter squadron commander, he falls down a flight of stairs at home, breaks his neck and is paralyzed. When "Min" tries to console him he rejects her and the family. He will only let his Navy mates like "Jughead" Carson and Price near him. "Jughead" visits the hospital almost daily to encourage Frank's rehabilitation ("I'm gonna move that toe"). Carson also pushes "Spig" to get over his depression, try to walk, and start writing. Wead achieves some success in all three goals.

After great success in Hollywood, Wead returns to active sea duty with the Navy in World War II, developing the idea of smaller escort, or "jeep," carriers which follow behind the main fleet as auxiliary strength to the main aircraft carrier force. He returns to active combat duty in the Pacific, witnessing first hand kamikaze attacks. Following a 50-hour shift during combat operations, Wead has a heart attack and is retired home before the war ends. When he leaves the carrier he is serving in for the last time, he receives eight sideboy in honor of his contributions to aviation—all of them Navy admirals or Army generals.

== Cast ==
- John Wayne as Frank "Spig" Wead
- Dan Dailey as "Jughead" Carson
- Maureen O'Hara as Min Wead
- Ward Bond as John Dodge
- Ken Curtis as John Dale Price (Price himself is credited as film's technical adviser)
- Edmund Lowe as Admiral Moffett
- Kenneth Tobey as Capt. Herbert Allen Hazard
- James Todd as Jack Travis
- Barry Kelley as Captain Clark
- Sig Ruman as Manager
- Henry O'Neill as Capt. Spear (in his last film role)
- Willis Bouchey as Barton
- Dorothy Jordan as Rose Brentmann
- Tige Andrews as Arizona Pincus (uncredited)
- Louis Jean Heydt as Dr. John Keye (uncredited)
- Olive Carey as Bridy O'Faolain (uncredited)
- Charles Trowbridge as Adm. Crown (uncredited)
- Blue Washington as Bartender (uncredited)

== Historical inaccuracies ==
An early scene shows first the U.S Army, around-the-world flight and then the U.S. Navy winning the Schneider Cup. In fact, the U.S. Navy won the Schneider Cup in 1923. and the U.S. Army embarked on the first aerial circumnavigation from March to September 1924.

Another scene shows a newsreel related to the sinking of the aircraft carrier USS Hornet (CV-8), suggesting that she had been doomed by the hit of three kamikaze suicide planes. Although two aircraft did crash into her, she received substantial damage by bombs and torpedoes, then was sunk by Japanese destroyers. Additionally, the term "kamikaze" was not in use to describe suicide pilots at the time of Hornet's sinking.

== Production ==
The film's battle scenes, based around aircraft carriers, include real combat footage.

Director John Ford is represented in the film in the character of film director John Dodge, played by Ward Bond.

== Box office ==
MGM reported that the film earned $2.3 million in the U.S. and Canada, and $1,350,000 in other markets, resulting in a profit of $804,000.

== Comic book adaptation ==
- Dell Four Color #790 (April 1957)

== See also ==
- List of American films of 1957
- The Court-Martial of Billy Mitchell (1955), a similar film about the birth of U.S. Army aviation
