= Hell Divers =

1932 film

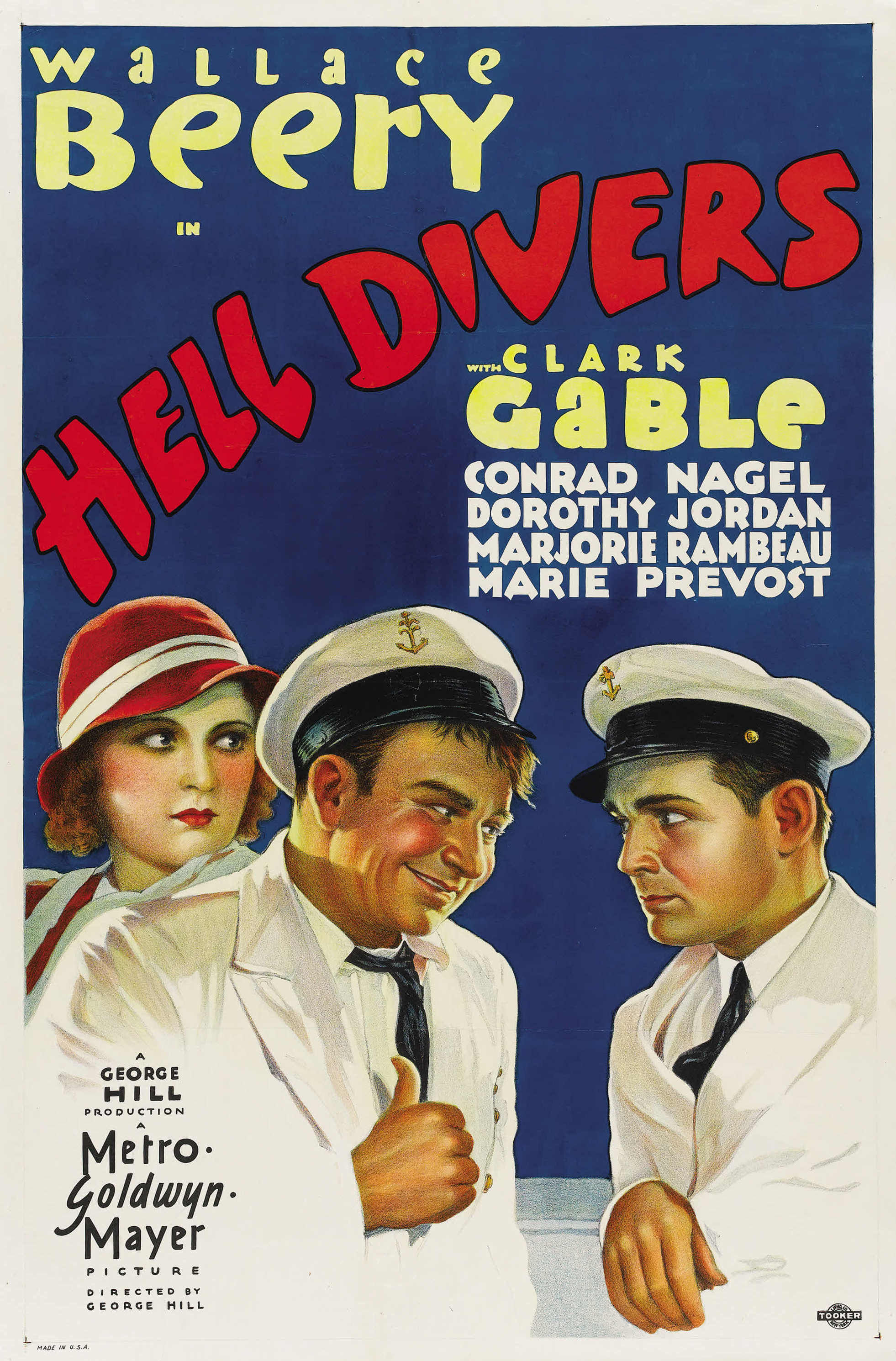
- Theatrical release poster
- Directed by: George W. Hill (uncredited)
- Written by: Frank Wead; Harvey Gates; Malcolm Stuart Boylan
- Produced by: George W. Hill
- Starring: Wallace Beery; Clark Gable
- Cinematography: Harold Wenstrom; Charles A. Marshall
- Edited by: Blanche Sewell
- Production company: George Hill Productions
- Distributed by: Metro-Goldwyn-Mayer (MGM)
- Release date: January 16, 1932 (United States)
- Running time: 109 min
- Country: United States
- Language: English
- Budget: $821,000
- Box office: $2.16 million

Hell Divers is a 1932 American pre-Code black-and-white film from Metro-Goldwyn-Mayer starring Wallace Beery and Clark Gable as a pair of competing chief petty officers in early naval aviation. The film, made with the cooperation of the United States Navy, features considerable footage of flight operations aboard the Navy's second aircraft carrier, the USS Saratoga, including dramatic shots of takeoffs and landings filmed from the Curtiss F8C-4 Helldiver dive bombers after which the movie was named. (Note: Two closeup shots of tailhooks catching arresting wires on the Saratoga were obscured by black bars superimposed across the bottom of the film, apparently for operational security reasons. More distant shots that show the same activity without explicit detail were left intact and commented on in The New York Times review.)

Nine months before Hell Divers was released, Gable had appeared in a supporting role in another Beery film, The Secret Six, in April 1931. For Gable, Hell Divers was not a pleasant experience since he was again billed beneath Beery, an actor he personally disliked. In 1935, Gable was billed over Beery in the lavish epic China Seas, one of only four films during the sound era in which Beery did not receive top billing. Other actors appearing include Conrad Nagel, Dorothy Jordan, Marjorie Rambeau, and Marie Prevost. An uncredited Robert Young appears near the end of the film in a speaking role as Graham, a pilot. As a published work from 1932, the film will enter the American public domain on January 1, 2028.

== Plot ==
Wallace Beery as Windy" Riker

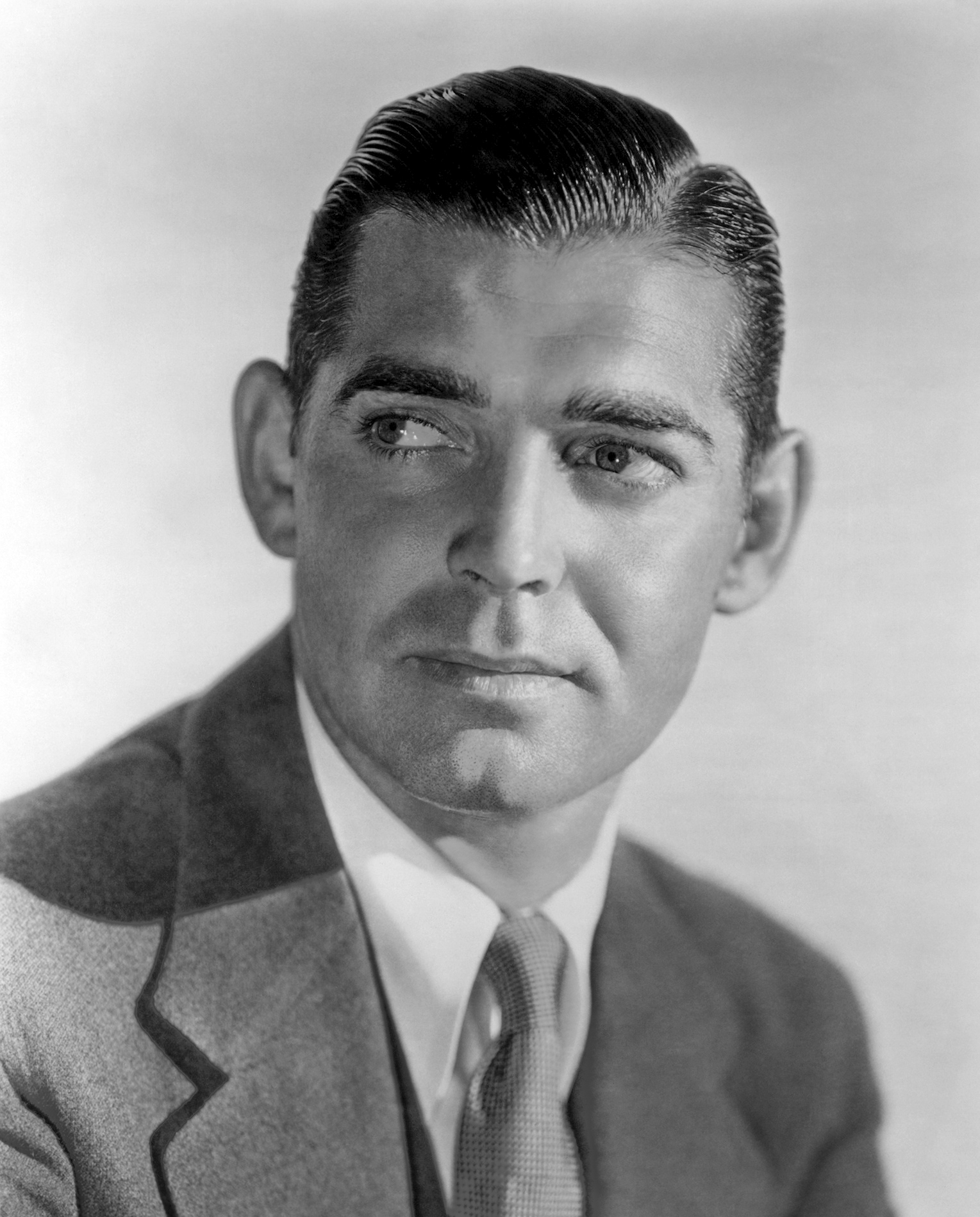
Clark Gable as Steve Nelson

Leading Chief Petty Officer "Windy" Riker (Note: The back of Windy's flight jacket and his stores box is stenciled "H.W. Riker A.C.M.M.", for "Aviation Chief Machinist's Mate.") is a veteran aerial gunner of a Navy Helldiver dive bomber and the leading chief of Fighting Squadron One, about to go to Panama aboard the USS Saratoga aircraft carrier. He loses his five-year title of "champion machine gunner" after young C.P.O. Steve Nelson joins the squadron. Windy, notorious for using his fists to enforce discipline, is charged by local police with wrecking a Turkish bath. Windy is saved from arrest, however, when Lieutenant Commander Jack Griffin, skipper of the squadron, intervenes on his behalf. Griffin and his second-in-command, Lieutenant "Duke" Johnson, agree that Nelson is the best candidate to replace Windy as he ponders retirement.

The chiefs engage in friendly rivalry until the squadron practices a new dive-bombing technique and Steve becomes a hero, saving the base from being accidentally bombed by climbing out on the wing of his dive bomber to hold in place a bomb that failed to release. Feelings turn bitter when Steve contradicts Windy's explanation of the accident and Windy punches him in resentment. Windy is dressed down by Duke when the officer sees the punch. When Steve's sweetheart, Ann Mitchell, visits him, he proposes marriage to her, but Windy uses a practical joke to get even with Steve. Unaware that Ann is Steve's fiancée and not simply a girl he is trying to impress, Windy bribes an old acquaintance, Lulu, to pretend to be Steve's outraged lover. Ann leaves upset and will not listen to Steve's denials.

Griffin loses an arm following a mid-air collision at night. The accident occurs when the aircraft are returning from delivering the admiral to his flagship the Saratoga before the squadron embarks. (Note: Griffin's aircraft bears a two-star flag emblem on its fuselage during takeoff.) Griffin is retired and replaced in command of Fighting One by Duke Johnson. Windy becomes Johnson's gunner when the squadron flies to the ship. During a bombing exercise off Panama, Windy misplaces his code book and delays the takeoff of the squadron. As punishment, he is assigned to supervise a work party when the ship docks, missing liberty and keeping him from seeing Mame Kelsey (Rambeau), the woman in Panama he wants to settle down with after retirement.

Steve, who knows Mame, encounters her on the dock and shares her carriage, but Windy hears about it and sneaks into town. Mame tries to convince Steve to patch up his differences with Windy, then promotes peace between them when Windy shows up at her hotel. Having a drink together in the bar, however, Windy starts a brawl. Steve tries to help him avoid the local police but Windy is thrown in jail. As the Saratoga passes through the Panama Canal, Mame bails Windy out of jail and he catches up to it by stealing a boat. For his transgressions, the captain of the Saratoga reduces Windy one rate from chief. Windy is disciplined at "Captain's Mast" and reduced to Aviation Machinist's Mate 1st Class for leaving his post without authorization, absent without leave, and missing ship. Steve reluctantly becomes leading chief.

During a mock battle, Steve's aircraft crashes near a rocky island, killing the pilot and leaving Steve with a broken leg. Duke and Windy land to rescue Steve, but Duke suffers a head injury and Windy has to save both. They have only a radio receiver and cannot be found in the fog. Steve and Windy become friends while waiting for rescue. Windy writes Ann a note confessing what he did with Lulu. After four days, Duke's condition worsens, Steve develops blood poisoning, and they hear on the radio that the Saratoga is leaving. Windy tries to save them by flying them out in Duke's dive bomber, with Duke in the rear cockpit and Steve riding on the wing. Despite the fog, they find the aircraft carrier, but crash on landing and Windy is fatally injured. By his last request, Windy is buried at sea as a missing man formation flies overhead.

== Cast ==
- Wallace Beery as C.P.O. H.W. "Windy" Riker
- Clark Gable as C.P.O. Steve Nelson
- Conrad Nagel as Lieutenant D.W. "Duke" Johnson
- Dorothy Jordan as Ann Mitchell
- Marjorie Rambeau as Mame Kelsey
- Marie Prevost as Lulu Farnsworth
- Cliff Edwards as "Baldy"
- John Miljan as Lieutenant Commander Jack Griffin
- Landers Stevens as Admiral
- Reed Howes as Lieutenant Fisher
- Alan Roscoe as Captain, U.S.S. Saratoga
- Frank Conroy as Chaplain

== Production ==
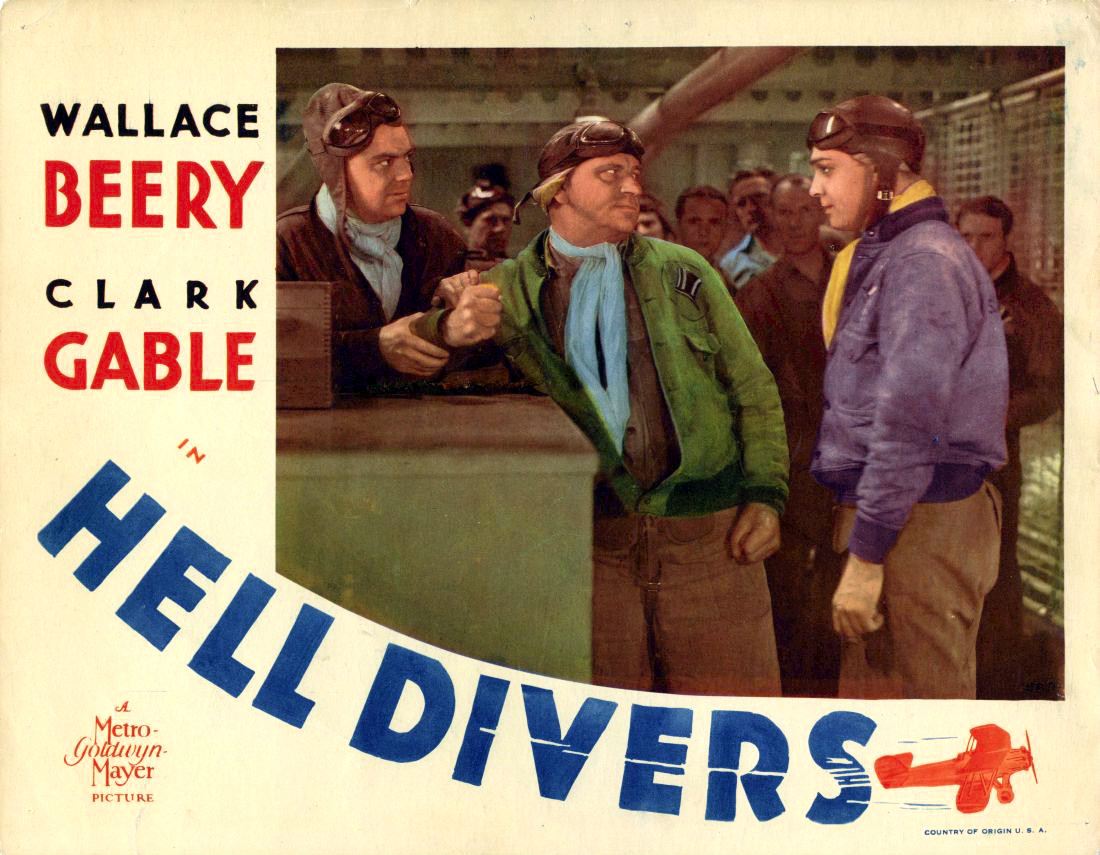
Hell Divers lobby card

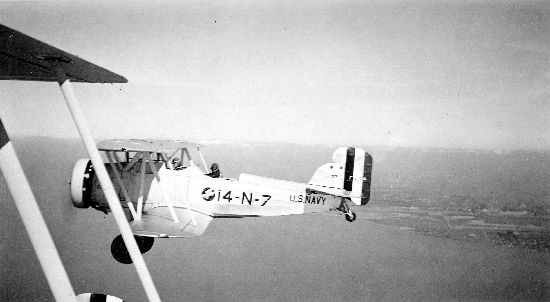
Curtiss F8C-4 Helldiver

Hell Divers is based loosely on the earlier war epic, What Price Glory? (1926), "Lt. Comdr. Frank Wead, U.S.N. (Ret.)" is credited for the film's story. Wead was himself later portrayed by John Wayne in John Ford's movie biography The Wings of Eagles, in which footage of Hell Divers appears. Ford regular Jack Pennick has a small role in both, appearing uncredited in Hell Divers as a recruit sailor.

Principal aerial photography under the helm of cinematographer Charles A. Marshall took place in 1931 at North Island Naval Air Station in San Diego, California. The aircraft used in the film were the Curtiss F8C-4 variant, the first production variant to bear the nickname "Helldiver". A total of 25 F8C-4 aircraft were transferred to the U.S. Marine Corps shortly after the release of Hell Divers. The production received full cooperation from the US Department of the Navy . The film featured the song (uncredited but considered the unofficial song of the US Navy), "Anchors Aweigh" (1906) (written by Charles A. Zimmerman, lyrics by Alfred Hart Miles and R. Lovell) in the opening credits but also a dedication to the naval aviators who made the film possible.

While a small number of miniatures stood in for the real aircraft, as well in a mock battle by airships attacking the Saratoga, the majority of the aerial scenes directed by Marshall, featured the actual Helldivers of VF-1B. Real events were woven into the film; footage of the historic 1928 landing of the airship USS Los Angeles aboard the carrier was also incorporated into the story. In addition to sequences filmed aboard the Saratoga at sea and in the Panama Canal, Hell Divers was filmed at the NAS North Island, as one of the first of a series of naval epics filmed there.

== Release ==
Hell Divers had a sneak preview in San Bernardino on October 29, 1931, but was not released until January 16, 1932.

== Reception ==
Hell Divers was received well both critically and with audiences. Reviews focused on the exciting aerial sequences. Mordaunt Hall, in The New York Times, effused over the "magnificently photographed production, one that includes naval air stunts and impressive 'landing' feats", while dismissing the plot as "inconsequential". Much later reviews note the "boisterous" interplay between notorious scene-stealer Beery and Gable; while, for aircraft enthusiasts, the film is considered an aviation classic.

=== Box-office ===
According to MGM records, Hell Divers earned $1,244,000 in the U.S. and Canada and $917,000 elsewhere, resulting in a profit of $458,000.
