= Ceiling Zero =

1936 film by Howard Hawks

- Theatrical release poster
- Directed by: Howard Hawks
- Screenplay by: Frank Wead
- Based on: the play Ceiling Zero by Frank Wead
- Produced by: Jack L. Warner; Hal Wallis
- Starring: James Cagney; Pat O'Brien
- Cinematography: Arthur Edeson
- Edited by: William Holmes
- Music by: M.K. Jerome; Bernhard Kaun
- Production company: Cosmopolitan Productions
- Distributed by: Warner Bros. Pictures
- Release date: January 16, 1936 (U.S.)
- Running time: 95 minutes
- Country: United States
- Language: English

Ceiling Zero is a 1936 American adventure drama film directed by Howard Hawks and starring James Cagney and Pat O'Brien. The picture stars Cagney as daredevil womanizing pilot "Dizzy" Davis and O'Brien as Jake Lee, his war veteran buddy and the operations manager of an airline company. Based on a stage play of the same name, the film blends drama with some light comedy. The title, as defined at the beginning of the picture, is an insider term referring to those moments when the sky is so thick with fog that navigating an aircraft is nearly impossible.

== Plot ==
Old pals Jake Lee, Tex Clarke and Dizzy Davis flew together in the Army during World War I. Almost 20 years later, Jake is the manager of the Newark, New Jersey branch of Federal Airlines, a New York-based airline company. Tex works as an airmail pilot and Dizzy, also still flying aircraft, is seeking employment with his friends. Prior to his hot-shot arrival (Dizzy does a few tricks in the air before landing), a New York associate warns Jake about Dizzy, calling him unreliable and troublesome. Insulted, Jake replies that Dizzy is one of the best pilots in the country, telling a few stories about his fearlessness and bravery.

Jake hires Dizzy as an airmail pilot. Dizzy is immediately attracted to "Tommy" Thomas, a 19-year-old girl also working there, who has just learned to fly solo. In order to go on a date with her, Dizzy, scheduled for a flight to Cleveland in the evening, pretends he is suddenly sick and gets Tex to replace him. Tex makes it to Cleveland, but on the way back to New Jersey, finds himself in a cold and heavy fog. Though there is zero visibility and he is having radio problems, he attempts to land in Newark. He crashes into one of the airport hangars and the aircraft catches on fire. Tex is taken to the hospital where he later dies.

Tex's wife Lou, who was never very fond of Dizzy, blames him for her husband's death. She calls him selfish and irresponsible and says that he hurts everything he touches. Dizzy, overwhelmed with guilt, returns to the airport. Meanwhile, the weather has gotten even worse and Jake has canceled all other flights. In addition, the aviation authorities have revoked Dizzy's pilot license, for extraneous reasons. Jake consoles Dizzy on account of both losses and then goes home for the night, leaving him temporarily in charge. Another pilot, unaware of the cancellation, comes into the operations building, ready for his scheduled flight to Cleveland.

Chagrined and burdened with his culpability, Dizzy demands the man explain how the newly acquired and, as yet, untested aircraft de-icers function, then knocks the man unconscious and irrationally takes his aircraft. Jake and the others are devastated when they find out. Dizzy radios information over to them about the de-icers. They work to a degree, but the system is flawed. He reports by radio on the problems of the system and his recommendations for modifications, knowing that he will watch progressive icing until he dies. He does not make it through the snow storm.

== Cast ==
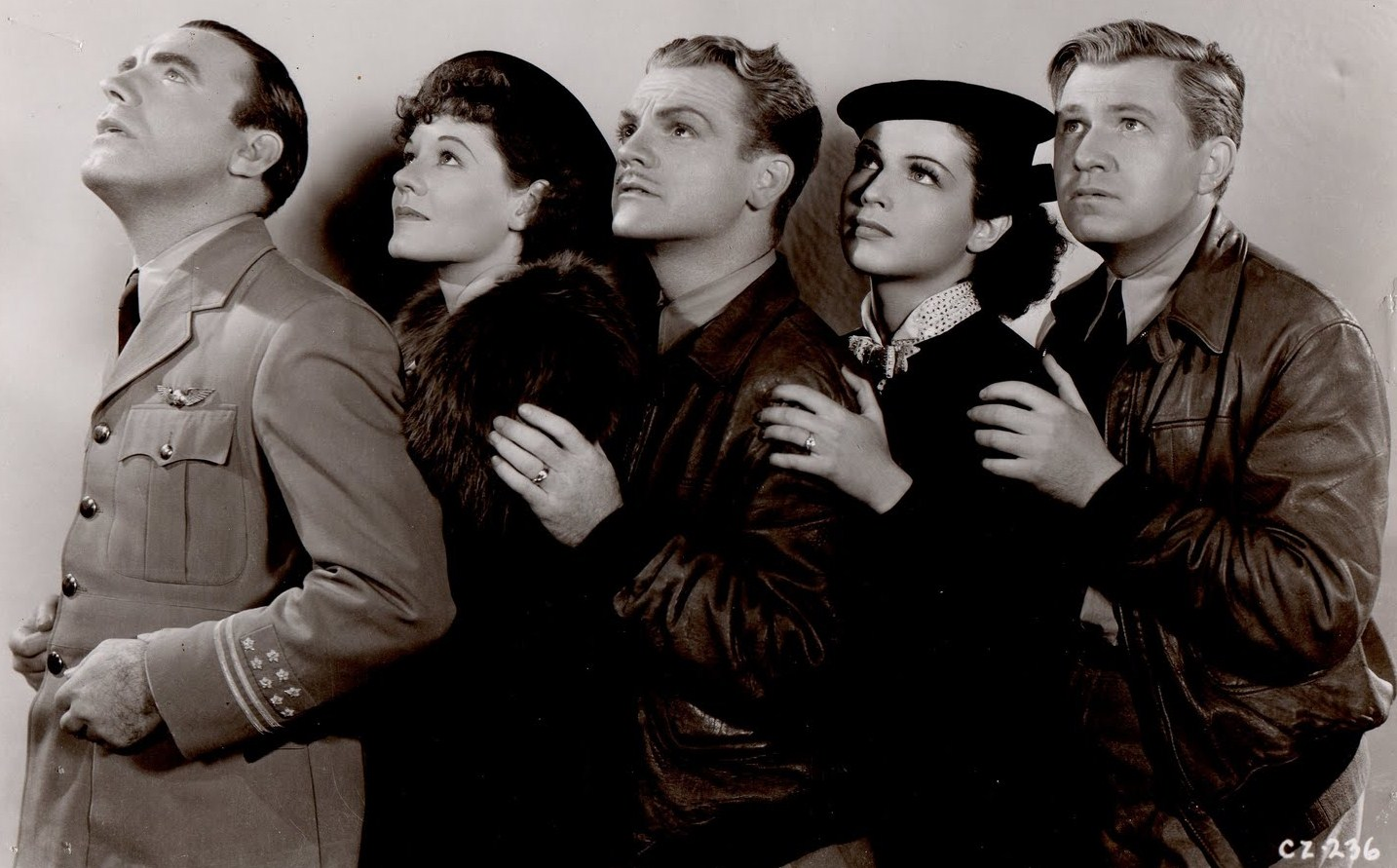
O'Brien, Tibbetts, Cagney, Travis & Erwin

- James Cagney as Dizzy Davis
- Pat O'Brien as Jake Lee
- June Travis as "Tommy" Thomas
- Stuart Erwin as Texas Clarke
- Martha Tibbetts as Mary Miller Lee
- Isabel Jewell as Lou Clarke
- Craig Reynolds as Joe Allen
- Dick Purcell as Smiley
- Carlyle Moore Jr. as Eddie Payson
- Addison Richards as Fred Adams
- Garry Owen as Mike Owens
- Edward Gargan as Doc Wilson
- Robert Light as Les Bogan
- James Bush as Buzz Gordon
- Pat West as Baldy

== Production ==
Jack L. Warner and Hal Wallis produced this film through Warner Bros. Pictures, First National and Cosmopolitan Productions. Navy aviator turned screenwriter Frank 'Spig' Wead provided the script, based on the original three-act play he wrote for Broadway, which ran for a few months in 1935 at the Music Box Theatre; two decades later, Wead was portrayed by John Wayne in John Ford's screen biography of Wead, The Wings of Eagles (1957).

Cagney and O'Brien appeared together in Devil Dogs of the Air, another aviation-themed film, also in 1935. The budget was limited, as Ceiling Zero was shot entirely either in the studio or on the backlot.

== Reception ==
Describing it as "tersely written, handsomely produced and played to perfection", Frank Nugent in The New York Times declared it " ... a constantly absorbing chronicle of life in and around a commercial airport." He also called the film "one of the best to come from the Warner studios."

Variety wrote that the film provided "all the punch of the original stage play, plus the extra advantages the screen can contribute to this type of material, is intact in Ceiling Zero. It has a fine cast that's double-barrelled in performance and on the draw, and an entertainment wallop of extraordinary power." Variety commented positively on the performances given by James Cagney, Pat O’Brien, Isabel Jewell, Martha Tibbetts, Gary Owen and Stuart Erwin, writing that the latter "turns in a trouping job that always equals Cagney and O’Brien, and now and then even transcends theirs."

More recently, film critic Leonard Maltin gave it 3 out of 4 stars calling it "one of the best Cagney-O'Brien vehicles."

In 2025, The Hollywood Reporter listed Ceiling Zero as having the best stunts of 1936.
