= China Clipper (film) =

1936 film by Ray Enright

- Theatrical release poster
- Directed by: Ray Enright
- Written by: Norman Reilly Raine (add'l dialogue, uncredited)
- Screenplay by: Frank Wead
- Produced by: Samuel Bischoff
- Starring: Pat O'Brien; Ross Alexander; Beverly Roberts
- Cinematography: Arthur Edeson
- Edited by: Owen Marks
- Music by: Bernhard Kaun; Heinz Roemheld
- Production company: First National Pictures
- Distributed by: Warner Bros. Pictures
- Release date: August 22, 1936
- Running time: 85 minutes
- Country: United States
- Language: English

China Clipper is a 1936 American drama film directed by Ray Enright, written by Frank Wead and starring Pat O'Brien, Ross Alexander, Beverly Roberts, Humphrey Bogart and, in his final motion-picture appearance, veteran actor Henry B. Walthall. Walthall was gravely ill during production and his illness was incorporated into his character's role. He died during production.

The film was produced by First National Pictures and distributed by its parent company Warner Bros. Pictures.

== Plot ==
In the mid-1930s, Dave Logan, inspired by Lindbergh's nonstop flight over the Atlantic, struggles to build and fly a new ocean-going flying boat with the goal of reaching China from San Francisco. His wife Jean and his boss Jim Horn try to discourage him, but he enlists his World War I pilot buddy Tom Collins and aircraft designer "Dad" Brunn, to start an airline flying between Philadelphia and Washington, D.C.

Undeterred when the airline fails, the group start a second airline in Key West, Florida to deliver mail throughout the Caribbean. Another pilot friend, Hap Stuart, joins as the airline begins to prosper. The success of this line strengthens Logan's desire to fly over the Pacific. He becomes obsessed, making life difficult for all around him, including his wife and best friends. This selfish adherence to his ambition causes Jean to leave him and Hap to quit. Logan mortgages his South American line to finance the Pacific flight, and his sacrifice causes Hap to return to be pilot of the new plane.

The China Clipper is the last project for Dad, who succumbs to heart disease shortly after the takeoff. When the China Clipper encounters a severe Typhoon off the China coast, Logan decides he must cancel the history-making flight, but Hap lands the big flying boat safely with several minutes to spare, winning a most important aviation contract. Logan's work is vindicated, but he becomes sobered by the costs associated with his success, and he and Jean are reunited. This secures the future for Dave Logan's vision of the first worldwide international airline.

== Cast ==
- Pat O'Brien as Dave Logan
- Beverly Roberts as Jean "Skippy" Logan
- Ross Alexander as Tom Collins
- Humphrey Bogart as Hap Stuart
- Marie Wilson as Sunny Avery
- Joseph Crehan as Jim Horn
- Joseph King as Mr. Pierson
- Addison Richards as Mr. B.C. Hill
- Ruth Robinson as Mother Brunn
- Henry B. Walthall as Dad Brunn
- Carlyle Moore Jr. as Radio Operator on Clipper
- Lyle Moraine as Co-Pilot on Clipper
- Dennis Moore as Engineer on Clipper
- Wayne Morris as Navigator on Clipper
- Alexander Cross as Bill Andrews
- William Wright as Pilot who won't fly
- Kenneth Harlan as Department of Commerce Inspector
- Anne Nagel as Logan's Receptionist
- Marjorie Weaver as Logan's Secretary
- Milburn Stone as Radio Operator
- Owen King as Radio Operator
- Houseley Stevenson as Doctor (uncredited)
- Walter Miller as Instructor (uncredited)

== Production ==
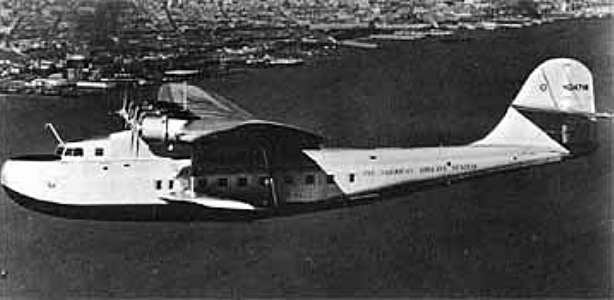
Martin M-130 China Clipper

Screenwriter Frank "Spig" Wead wrote the film as a thinly disguised biography of aviation pioneer Juan Trippe, especially Trippe's life around the period of the founding of Pan American Airways. Filmed with the cooperation of Pan Am, actual newsreel and production footage of the Martin M-130 is used throughout the film to emphasize the story just as it was happening for Trippe in real life. Aviation film historian Mark Carlson described China Clipper as a "veiled advertisement for what was once one of the greatest airlines in the world."

The flying sequences in China Clipper were filmed with famed Hollywood stunt pilot Paul Mantz, who worked with veterans Elmer Dyer and H. F. Koenekamp to create realistic aerial photography. Some scenes depict the aircraft flying over the incomplete San Francisco-Oakland Bay Bridge while it was still under construction.

The aircraft used in China Clipper are:

- Martin M-130 c/n 558, NC14716
- Lockheed Vega5C c/n 100, NC48M
- Fokker F-10A c/n 1042, NC582K
- Douglas Dolphin1 Special c/n 999, NC967Y
- Consolidated Model 16 Commodore
- Sikorsky S-40
- Sikorsky S-42 Clipper
- Ford Trimotor4 ATE
- Keystone LB-7
- Keystone B-4A

== Reception ==
Despite Warner Bros.' typical casting and plot, China Clipper was well received, as its packaging did not detract from the timely account of a transpacific flight. In his review for The New York Times, Frank S. Nugent commented: "A fascinating and surprisingly literal dramatization of the China Clipper's transpacific flight of last November, the picture deserves a respectful accolade both for its technical accuracy and for its rather astonishing refusal to describe the flying boat's journey in the stock terms of aerial melodrama." (Note: A line from China Clipper that is spoken several times, "China Clipper calling Alameda," is repeated by Davy Jones in The Monkees' spoken-word song "Zilch," from their 1967 album Headquarters.)
