= Destroyer (1943 film) =

1943 war film directed by William A. Seiter

- Theatrical Film Poster
- Directed by: William A. Seiter
- Screenplay by: Frank Wead; Lewis Meltzer; Borden Chase
- Story by: Frank Wead
- Produced by: Louis F. Edelman
- Starring: Edward G. Robinson
- Cinematography: Franz Planer
- Edited by: Gene Havlick
- Music by: Anthony Collins
- Production company: Columbia Pictures
- Distributed by: Columbia Pictures
- Release date: August 19, 1943
- Running time: 99 minutes
- Country: United States
- Language: English
- Box office: $1.3 million (US rentals)

Destroyer is a 1943 American war film directed by William A. Seiter and starring Edward G. Robinson.

== Plot ==
Steve "Boley" Boleslavski is working a shipyard on the Pacific coast building a new destroyer to serve in the Second World War: the John Paul Jones. He served as bosun on the ship of the same name in the First World War. Finding that one of his former crew is to command the ship he determines to serve on the ship despite having retired from the Navy. He is at first rejected but uses his connections to obtain a post as Bosun.

However, Boley alienates the crew, before the ship encounters a Japanese submarine off Alaska. Boley is made Chief Bosun's Mate demoting the originally appointed Chief, Mickey Donohue, to his assistant. However, after a number of arguments and technical problems affecting the ship, Boley punches Mickey and is demoted to Bosun's Mate with Mickey reappointed Chief. Mickey is cajoled into keeping Boley on board by his daughter, Mary but this also sparks a romance between Mickey and Mary. Knowing her dad wouldn't approve, Mickey and Mary get married in secret. The crew decide the ship is jinxed after being demoted to carrying mail and being told to not join up with the task force and write transfer requests which even Mickey can't prevent. Boley tells the rebellious crew the story behind John Paul Jones, the name of the ship, causing the crew to change their minds.

While en route with the mail, the ship is attacked by six Mitsubishi aircraft all of which are destroyed. However a torpedo hit causes flooding which is under control until the ship detects a submarine and increases speed. This causes more flooding and the water puts the boilers out causing the ship to stop. Mickey and Boley persuade the Captain that she can be made seaworthy by welding underwater which proves successful. Despite a skeleton crew, the destroyer sinks the submarine by ramming her, looked on proudly by the rest of the crew who'd taken to lifeboats. After safely returning home, Boley leaves the ship symbolically giving Mickey his Bosun's pipe but then discovers that Mickey and Mary are married when Mickey kisses her.

== Cast ==
- Edward G. Robinson as Steve Boleslavski
- Glenn Ford as Mickey Donohue
- Marguerite Chapman as Mary Boleslavski
- Edgar Buchanan as Kansas Jackson
- Leo Gorcey as Sarecky
- Regis Toomey as Lieutenant Commander Clark
- Edward Brophy as Casey
- Warren Ashe as Lieutenant Morton
- Benson Fong as Japanese sonar man (uncredited)
- Richard Loo as Japanese submarine captain (uncredited)
- Lloyd Bridges as Second Fireman (uncredited)
- Larry Parks as Ensign (uncredited)
- Bobby Jordan as Sobbing Sailor (uncredited)
- Kenneth MacDonald as Naval Commandant (uncredited)
- Pierre Watkin as Admiral (uncredited)

== Production ==
Lieutenant Commander Donald Smith, the film's technical advisor, served as Navigation Officer on USS Arizona until one month before the ship was sunk at Pearl Harbor.

The fictional destroyer in the film John Paul Jones II is, as explained in the film, named after the naval officer John Paul Jones who was the first commander of the US Navy. Although he died in France, he was reburied in the Naval Academy Chapel in Annapolis, Maryland. A film of his life was released in 1959.

There have been two ships of the United States Navy called John Paul Jones. At the time of the film, the Navy also had a destroyer called Paul Jones named for the historical figure. Currently operating with the US Navy is the USS John Paul Jones, an Arleigh Burke class destroyer (DDG-53). Like the fictional ship in this film, the USS John Paul Jones appeared prominently in a 2012 film, Battleship.

An error appears in the scene of the destroyer being launched as she begins to slide down the slipway before Mary launches the champagne bottle, which almost misses. This may have been because the scenes showing the ship sliding down the slipway used a real launching with the scene with Mary edited in post-production.

== Reception ==
Dennis Schwartz gave it a C+ grade, writing that "Though it offers no surprises, it's still well-done and mildly entertaining."
