= Dive Bomber (film) =

1941 film

- Theatrical release poster
- Directed by: Michael Curtiz
- Screenplay by: Frank Wead; Robert Buckner
- Story by: Frank Wead
- Produced by: Hal B. Wallis
- Starring: Errol Flynn; Fred MacMurray; Alexis Smith; Ralph Bellamy
- Cinematography: Bert Glennon; Winton C. Hoch
- Edited by: George Amy
- Music by: Max Steiner
- Color process: Technicolor
- Production company: Warner Bros. Pictures
- Distributed by: Warner Bros. Pictures
- Release date: August 30, 1941
- Running time: 133 minutes
- Country: United States
- Language: English
- Budget: $1,201,000
- Box office: $2,613,000

Dive Bomber is a 1941 American aviation drama film directed by Michael Curtiz, and starring Errol Flynn, Fred MacMurray and Alexis Smith. It was produced and distributed by Warner Bros. Pictures. The film is notable for both its Technicolor photography of pre-World War II United States Navy aircraft and as a historical document of the U.S. in 1941. This includes the aircraft carrier USS Enterprise, one of the best-known U.S. warships of World War II.

The film was the last of a collaboration between director Curtiz and actor Errol Flynn, which began in 1935 and spanned 12 films. The cast also includes Fred MacMurray, on loan from Paramount Studios, and Alexis Smith, in her first credited screen performance. Flynn portrays a Harvard-educated doctor who is involved in heroic medical research on pilots, with MacMurray as the skeptical veteran aviator who gets swept up in the project. The plot is not historically accurate, but depicted in a near-documentary style, the film contains elements of true events that were involved in period aeromedical research, as well as real contemporary medical equipment.

The vivid cinematography prompted the tagline: "The stunning spectacle of color rides with you into the heavens!" Bert Glennon was nominated for an Oscar for Best Color Cinematography at the 14th Academy Awards in 1942. The film is dedicated to the flight surgeons of the U.S. armed forces "in recognition of their heroic efforts to solve the immensely difficult problems of aviation medicine".The film was a big hit at the box office, rounding out as the 19th-highest-grossing film of 1941.

== Plot ==
During a bombing squadron's prewar operations from an aircraft carrier off Hawaii, one of the fliers, Lt. "Swede" Larson, blacks out during a high-speed dive and crashes. At the Honolulu base hospital, Lieutenant Commander Joe Blake (Fred MacMurray) is concerned that Larson (Louis Jean Heydt) will not survive. U.S. Navy doctor Lieutenant Doug Lee (Errol Flynn) convinces his senior surgeon (Addison Richards) to operate, but the pilot dies on the operating table. After Blake blames Lee for rushing the surgery, the doctor decides to become a naval flight surgeon and winds up being trained at the U.S. Naval Air Station in San Diego by a number of instructors, including Blake. A subplot introduces divorcee Linda Fisher (Alexis Smith) as a love interest for the two rivals, Blake and Lee. On completion of his flight training, Lee is posted as assistant to senior flight surgeon, Commander Lance Rogers (Ralph Bellamy). Together, they conduct experimental research into possible solutions for pilot blackout.

Even though he has qualified as a naval aviator, Lee's judgment of pilots' ability to fly is resented by Blake when he grounds an old friend, Lieutenant Tim Griffin (Regis Toomey), who is suffering from chronic fatigue. In anger, Griffin resigns from the Navy and joins the Royal Air Force in Canada. However, he later dies when misjudging his approach during an attempted landing. Blake finally accepts that Lee is trying to help pilots survive dangerous, high-altitude flying, and volunteers as a "guinea pig" pilot for aerial experiments. The first flight test of a pressurized cabin nearly ends in disaster when the aircraft ices up and Blake passes out, forcing Lee to take over. After ground testing of a pressure suit developed jointly by Lee and Blake, the latter is told that he did not pass his most recent flight physical and will be grounded. Without permission, Blake carries out the aerial testing of the new suit. Tragically, the oxygen regulator fails. As a result, Blake loses consciousness and fatally crashes. His notes are salvaged from the wreckage, however, and mass production of the suit begins. In the final scene, Blake's sacrifice is acknowledged while Rogers and Lee are honored for their pioneering work in protecting pilots flying at high altitude.

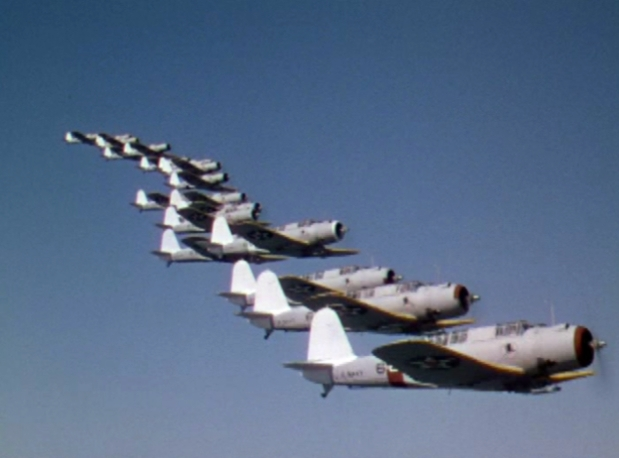
Vought SB2U Vindicators of VB-3 in formation, as seen in the opening scenes

== Cast ==
- Errol Flynn as LT Douglas S. "Doug" Lee, Medical Corps, USN
- Fred MacMurray as LCDR Joe Blake, USN
- Ralph Bellamy as LCDR Lance Rogers, Medical Corps, USN
- Alexis Smith as Mrs. Linda Fisher
- Robert Armstrong as Art Lyons
- Regis Toomey as LT Tim Griffin, USN
- Allen Jenkins as Hospital Corpsman 2nd Class "Lucky" James
- Craig Stevens as Pilot Trainee, ENS John Anthony, USN
- Herbert Anderson as LT "Slim" Markham, Medical Corps, USN
- Moroni Olsen as CDR Martin, Medical Corps, USN, in San Diego
- Dennie Moore as Ex-wife of "Lucky" James
- Louis Jean Heydt as LT "Swede" Larson, USN
- Cliff Nazarro as Double-talking Corpsman
- Tod Andrews as Telephone Man (uncredited)
- Creighton Hale as Hospital Attendant (uncredited)
- Howard Hickman as Admiral (uncredited)
- Addison Richards as Honolulu surgeon operating on Larson (uncredited)

== Production ==
=== Development ===
Dive Bomber is characterized as "Warner's tribute to the pre-Pearl Harbor U.S. Navy". Based on a screenplay adapted from an original story by Commander Frank "Spig" Wead, USN (Ret), Dive Bomber features spectacular flying scenes (as in other films with a scenario written by Wead) interwoven into a storyline of medical research undertaken to combat the effects of high g-force combat maneuvers. The "Schneider index" test playing a pivotal role in the plot in the story was actually a cardiovascular fatigue test familiar to pilots of the era. Developed in 1918 by Major Edward C. Schneider, an aviation medicine pioneer with the Air Service of the AEF, it was widely used by the military until World War II, when statistical analysis showed that a much simpler measurement was equally effective.

Upon the first reading of the proposed script, the Department of the Navy realized the potential of the film to be a showcase of U.S. Naval aviation and lent its full support to the production. Dive Bomber's working title was "Beyond the Blue Sky".

In December 1940, Warner Bros. originally intended to star James Cagney, George Brent, and Ronald Reagan, with Lloyd Bacon directing Dive Bomber. By February 1941, however, the script had been revised and the project reconfigured as an Errol Flynn film, with a new director. Filming was given priority over Flynn's other planned vehicle, They Died with Their Boots On (1941) because the U.S. Navy requested Dive Bomber be made as soon as possible.

Fred MacMurray was borrowed from Paramount to star opposite Flynn. In exchange, Paramount borrowed Olivia de Havilland from Warner Bros. for Hold Back the Dawn (1941).

Preproduction planning began in January 1941, and once the generous $1.7 million budget was established, a tight schedule of two months was determined for principal photography on location. Although the U.S. Navy had agreed to cooperate, providing over 1,000 officers and enlisted men along with access to some of its most highly secured facilities, world events had dictated a full war readiness, which placed additional pressures on the film cast and crew. With all naval air and sea forces committed to training and war exercises, Curtiz was notified in advance so that he could take advantage of the ongoing activities and set up his camera crews accordingly.

=== Filming ===
Dive Bomber was the final film collaboration between Errol Flynn and Michael Curtiz. It was the 12th and most contentious pairing of the high-spirited matinee idol and the fiery director. Throughout the production, an ever-widening rift emerged between the two due to conflicts over the use of actors in demanding and sometimes risky scenes, leading to inevitable clashes and delays in filming. The off-screen moments were fraught with stress for the cast and crew observing the contentious exchanges.

An ongoing motif involving gold cigarette cases from the National Air Races carried by each of the three "High Hats" squadron leaders continues into the final sequence. Blake is the last of the three to perish in service, and Lee throws his cigarette case from one of the squadron's airplanes out over the Pacific as a final tribute.

One bizarre incident came about when a formation of aircraft flew over the film set at a time when all the cameras were being reloaded. Curtiz reacted immediately by standing up and waving them off when he realized that the camera crews were not in position. The pilots, who were setting out on a daily exercise, simply ignored the gesticulating and screaming Curtiz below. The film crews were mightily amused by Curtiz's declarations of "No, no. Go back!" as if the flight crews could actually hear him. The incident was symptomatic of the many outbursts and exchanges on the set when the autocratic Curtiz helmed a film.

Principal photography began on March 20, 1941, at NAS North Island in San Diego with the famous aircraft carrier USS Enterprise, also placed at the disposal of the production crew of 150 actors and technicians for an entire week.

When principal photography commenced, the initial aircraft scenes featured U.S. Navy aircraft in their prewar colorful schemes, set off by the Technicolor process, making this a vibrant document, unique for its time.

During filming, as war preparations ramped up, the U.S. Navy ordered a new grey color camouflage for all its sea-based aircraft, with the associate producer Robert Lord scrambling to have a concession made where a few aircraft in each squadron would retain their colorful schemes to match previously shot footage. The film ultimately uses footage that includes aircraft in this new uniform light-grey color scheme especially in the carrier sequence.

Though famed aerial pilot and cinematographer Paul Mantz is listed in the credits as the chief pilot for Warner Bros., his injuries in a previous accident prevented him from doing the flying, so Frank Clarke took over, with Mantz continuing to oversee the air operations.

Although Errol Flynn had a pilot's license, he was expressly forbidden to fly in the production, under threat of suspension from Warner Bros. due to his "buzzing" the cast and crew of 1938's The Adventures of Robin Hood. Flynn did taxi a dive bomber to allow closeups of him in the cockpit during a critical scene when his character "is testing a g-resistant belt."

The bulky Technicolor cameras caused considerable problems in the scenes filmed in the air; special mounts were built to allow one of the two cameras in the chase aircraft to be moved back and forth. With the preponderance of actual aerial footage shot from a bevy of camera platforms, both on the ground and mounted to aircraft, Dive Bomber was notable in the restrained use of special effects. During the two months of studio post-production, footage of scale models and closeup "blue screen" effects were matched up with the aerial sequences.

During filming, Rear Admiral William Halsey Jr. was Commander of Aircraft Battle Force and had his flag on Enterprise. While he was not happy with the decision to use his ship for the week of filming because it cut into training, he had no choice but to follow orders. This didn't prohibit “Bull” Halsey from frequently and loudly making his displeasure known. On the final day of shooting, Halsey was witnessed to lean over the bridge railing and yell, “NOW GET THE HELL OFF MY SHIP!”. Errol Flynn, ever the swashbuckler he portrayed in film, rendered the Admiral a single-digit salute and dived off the deck into San Diego Bay. Much to the delight of the film crew.

=== Musical Score ===
The theme Max Steiner composed for Dive Bomber gave Warner Bros. good value. It was reused as the main theme for the films Fighter Squadron and Operation Pacific, and made an appearance in the film Up Periscope, as well.

=== Aircraft featured ===
The principal aircraft depicted in Dive Bomber are Vought SB2U Vindicator dive bombers and Douglas TBD Devastator torpedo bombers, although many other types are included, especially parked, as backdrops. The N3N Canary trainers were the primary type in use at Naval Air Station North Island and are featured prominently in the flight training sequence.

All other aircraft were deployed temporarily for training to North Island and were subsequently available for use in the film. An entire squadron of Grumman F3F fighters from the USS Enterprise was flown to NAS North Island with a single example appearing prominently in the penultimate "pressure suit" scenes both on the ground and in the air. All the aerial close-up work with the cast was photographed later in the studio using a series of realistic mock-ups. Some of the aircraft types used in Dive Bomber were engaged a few months later in combat with the Japanese aerial and naval forces, up to and including the Battle of Midway, while other types were declared obsolescent and relegated to home use when the U.S. geared up for war in earnest. Enterprise is the film's aircraft carrier, and went on to be one of the most famous ships of World War II.

Other aircraft types featured in the film include the biplane Curtiss SBC Helldiver (no relation to the SB2C of the same name and manufacturer), Brewster F2A Buffalo (in long shots), one Lockheed Electra 10A (the testbed for the pressurized cabin, olive green and marked with the "X" of an experimental aircraft), and one good shot of a Douglas SBD Dauntless. For security reasons, no bombs or torpedoes are shown. Several of the squadrons featured, and undoubtedly many of the aircrew, such as Bombing Squadron 6 of the Enterprise, later played critical roles at the battles of Coral Sea, Midway, and other World War II engagements. Two rare shots are the landing on and subsequent launch from the Enterprise in its prewar livery, filmed from an aircraft.

== Reception ==
=== Box office ===
Released just months before the Japanese attacked Pearl Harbor, Dive Bomber generally was well received by the public, while the U.S. Navy lent the new SBD Dauntless dive bomber to be displayed in conjunction with film screenings at principal cities, and set up recruiting booths by the theaters.

The film was Warner Bros.'s most popular film of 1941, generating a profit in excess of $1 million. It was listed as the sixth-most popular film over all of 1941.

According to Warner Bros records, the film earned $1,755,000 domestically and $858,000 foreign.

=== Critical ===
Critically reviewed, Dive Bomber was praised for its colorful subject matter, but the plot as conceived by the screenwriting team of Frank Wead and Robert Buckner was considered "fanciful" and a "necessary evil" by Bosley Crowther of The New York Times.

Filmink magazine said, "There’s not a lot of action, comedy or romance, and it’s not a very good movie, but it was in colour with two big stars and American audiences were keen to see films about their military at the time – it was a smash."

== In popular culture ==
The film was also an inspiration for the song "Divebomber" from Neil Finn's 2014 solo album Dizzy Heights.

The film was parodied on The Jack Benny Program, on October 28, 1941.

== Bibliography ==
- Dive Bomber. Los Angeles: Warner Home Video, 2007.
- Dive Bomber: Keep 'Em in the Air. Atlanta: Turner Entertainment Company, 2005.
- Dolan, Edward F. Jr. Hollywood Goes to War. London: Bison Books, 1985. ISBN 0-86124-229-7.
- Farmer, James H. "Hollywood Goes to North Island NAS." Air Classics, Volume 25, No. 9, September 1989.
- Hardwick, Jack and Ed Schnepf. "A Viewer's Guide to Aviation Movies". The Making of the Great Aviation Films, General Aviation Series, Volume 2, 1989.
- Kinnard, Roy and R.J. Vitone. The American Films of Michael Curtiz. Metuchen, New Jersey: Scarecrow Press, 1986. ISBN 0-8108-1883-3.
- Orriss, Bruce. When Hollywood Ruled the Skies: The Aviation Film Classics of World War II. Hawthorne, California: Aero Associates Inc., 1984. ISBN 0-9613088-0-X.
- Robertson, James C. The Casablanca Man: The Cinema of Michael Curtiz. London: Routledge, 1994. ISBN 978-0-415-11577-3.
- Tranberg, Charles. Fred MacMurray: A Biography. Albany, Georgia: Bear Manor Media, 2014. ISBN 978-0-8108-2315-0.
- Tillman, Barrett. “Enterprise: America's Fightingest Ship and the Men Who Helped Win World War II”. Mesa, Arizona: Simon and Schuster, 2012. ISBN 978-1439190876.
