= George C. Tyler =

American theatrical producer (1867–1946)

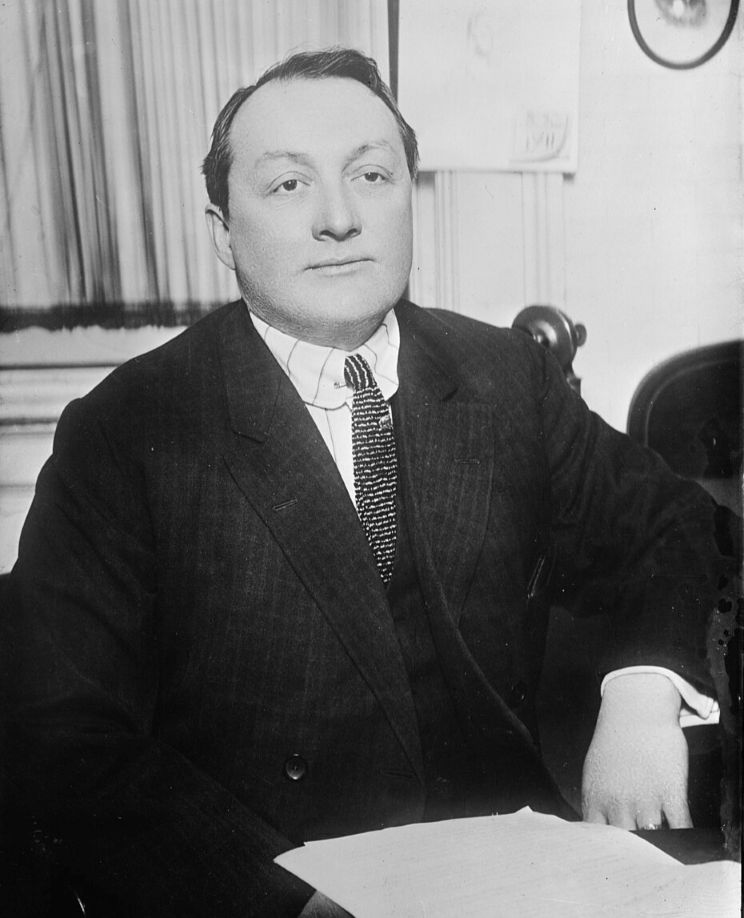
- George C. Tyler 1911
- Born: George Crouse Tyler; April 13, 1867; Circleville, Ohio, U.S.
- Died: March 13, 1946 (aged 78); Yonkers, New York, U.S.
- Occupations: Theatre producer; manager
- Years active: 1888-1935
- Known for: Liebler & Company
- Notable work: Pollyanna, Clarence, Bab, Dulcy
- Spouse: Cora Parson (m. 1892–1893)

Signature
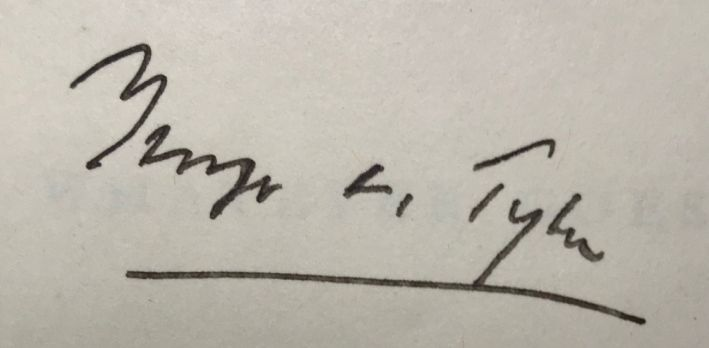

George Crouse Tyler (April 13, 1867 – March 13, 1946) was an American theatrical producer and talent manager. As co-founder of Liebler & Company he was instrumental in producing over 100 Broadway productions from 1897 through 1914. Later, as an independent he produced fifty more original shows and revivals from 1915 through 1935. He promoted and managed talents such as James O'Neill, Viola Allen, Eleanor Robson, William C. Hodge, Alfred Lunt, Lynn Fontanne, and Helen Hayes. A good friend of Booth Tarkington, he produced and financed some of his works that might not have otherwise been staged, and in return was inserted into Tarkington's Presenting Lily Mars. He produced one of Eugene O'Neill's early plays, and gave George S. Kaufman and Marc Connelly their first playwriting assignment and sponsored their early comedies. He also produced the first play by John Van Druten after it had been banned in the UK. His 1934 memoirs proved so popular, he was given a syndicated newspaper column.

== Early years ==
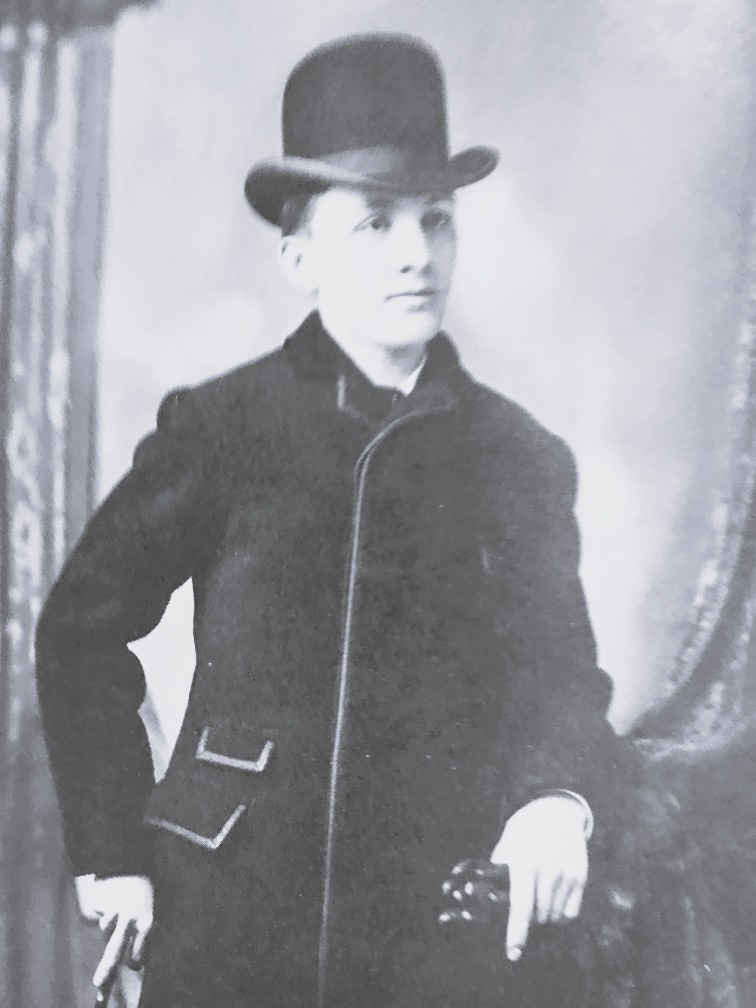
George C. Tyler 1885

George Crouse Tyler was born in Circleville, Ohio, the oldest of three children for George H. Tyler and Harriet Parkhurst Tyler. He had a younger brother, Albert, who died before 1900, and a much younger sister Edith.

Tyler's family moved to Chillicothe, Ohio, where his father, an American Civil War veteran and carpenter, became owner-editor of the Scioto Gazette. (Note: It was named for the nearby Scioto River. In the 1890s it became The Daily Gazette, and later the Chillicothe Gazette.) Along with the newspaper, Tyler's father owned the print shop that produced it. At age 12, young Tyler persuaded his father to let him leave school and start work in the print shop at a dollar a week. Tyler and his father shared a passion for the theater; they often journeyed to nearby cities for stage performances too grand to stop at little Chillicothe. Tyler recalled that his first experience of the stage was seeing Jerry and Helen Cohan in Haworth's Hibernica.

Tyler grew up in comfortable circumstances, but was beset with wanderlust. He left home as a teenager, riding the rails and working as an itinerant compositor, roaming as far as Tucson, Los Angeles, and San Francisco. He could easily get jobs in print shops and with local newspapers, having learned early that margins were the key to successful compositing. After a few weeks or months he would drift on to the next western town. While riding illicitly on a passenger train from San Francisco to Truckee, California, in November 1884, Tyler and his buddy Frank Forbes made the newspapers after the latter was injured riding the roof of the train. Instead of being arrested, they were given jobs on a startup newspaper in Truckee, the Tri-Weekly News. Tyler also claimed to have disguised himself as a Native American, for at that time the western railroads allowed tribal members free passage.

== Stage management start ==
Tyler returned to Chillicothe, where in March 1888 his father leased Clough's Opera House and let him manage it, trying to keep his son in town. Tyler's tenure lasted only four months, marked by his susceptibility to famous names. He wired booking offers without negotiating terms, bringing Thomas W. Keene, Nat Goodwin, Clara Morris, May Irwin, and Julia Marlowe to little Chillicothe, and nearly bankrupted his father.

After this debacle, Tyler's father sought a position in the Patent Office for him, securing recommendations from James G. Blaine and Senator John Sherman. These did not impress Theodore Roosevelt, who sat on the board of the United States Civil Service Commission. Roosevelt told Tyler he would have to pass the Civil Service exam. Though he was a voracious reader, Tyler knew his haphazard formal education was not up to this challenge, so he accepted a job in the Government Printing Office instead.

== Reporter ==
Tyler spent a year in Washington, D.C., then went to Manhattan and took a job as a compositor on the New York World. Leander Richardson then hired him as a reporter on the Dramatic News for ten dollars a week. After getting into a fight in the newspaper's office with actor Frederick McCloy over actress Clara Louise Thompson, Tyler was fired, but convinced Harrison Grey Fiske to hire him for the New York Dramatic Mirror. Fiske sent Tyler to interview actor-playwright Dion Boucicault, who had announced a new stage production, even as he lay in bed dying. Tyler spent several days with him, and later said: "The way Boucicault faced death was the finest piece of drama he ever concocted."

== Advance agent ==
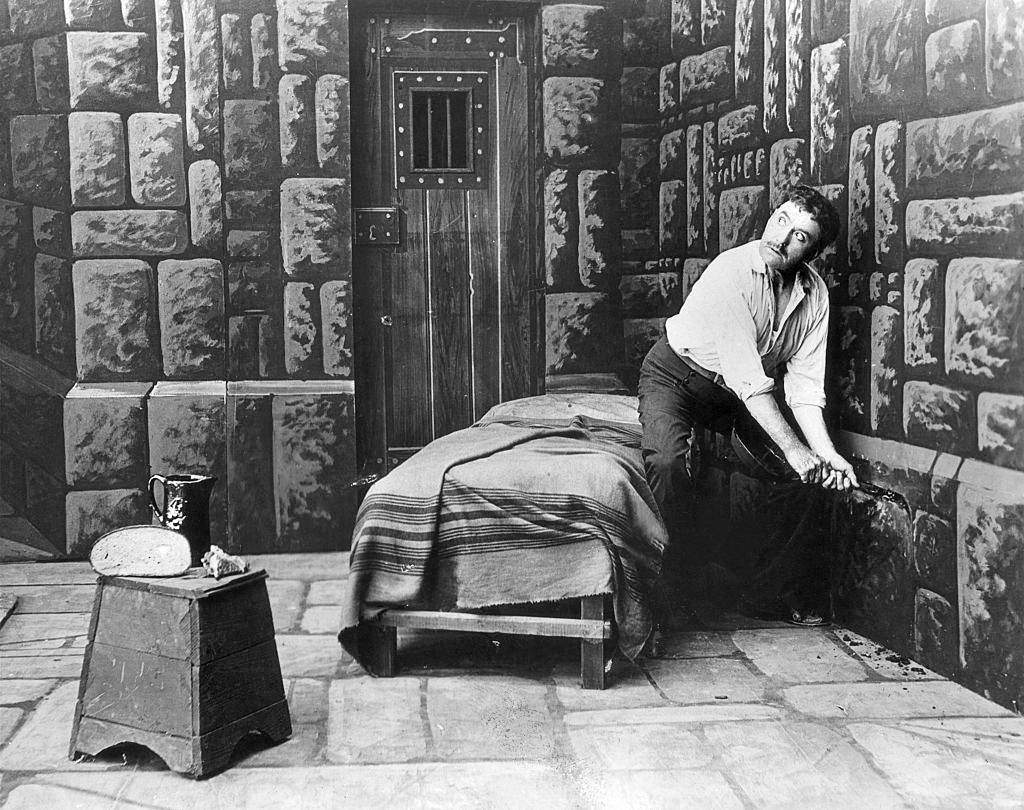
James O'Neill in The Count of Monte Cristo (1913)

Abe Erlanger put Tyler onto a job as an advance agent. According to Tyler, an advance agent "went ahead of a road company and made all the arrangements for publicity and advertising". The "road" at that time (1890) encompassed the live theaters that every little town had, along with a train station. By the time Tyler wrote his memoirs in 1934, he considered the road dead and gone, killed by the movies. Tyler picked up with Willard Spenser's The Little Tycoon tour after being stranded in Toronto by an earlier advance job. Tyler stayed with Spenser's tour through summer 1891, going on to other advance work for the next five years. (Note: According to Tyler, producers Abe Erlanger, Marc Klaw, and the Frohman brothers all got their start in theatre as advance agents.) Though he had resigned his salaried position with the Dramatic Mirror upon becoming an advance man, Tyler still maintained connections with it.

Tyler's favorite employer was actor James O'Neill, who was doing endless revivals of his signature role, Charles Fechter's adapatation of The Count of Monte Cristo. They became close friends, Tyler serving as general factotum for Mrs. O'Neill and her youngest son Eugene on tour, finding a doctor in a winter storm when the toddler had a choking fit. While in Denver doing advance work for O'Neill, Australian boxer Jim Hall introduced Tyler to "Mr. Masterson from Dodge City", who had "the deadest face I ever saw, carved out of ironwood".

Tyler took on representing Billy Hanlon's spectacle Superba in February 1893. The Chillicothe Gazette reported in October 1893 that he would be on the road for that show for the next six months. However, the show's properties were lost in the fire that destroyed Boston's Globe Theatre on January 1, 1894. Willard Spenser then hired him to promote his comic opera, The Princess Bonnie, in Philadelphia, where Tyler would spend another season building up his reputation and credit as a publicity man.

== First productions ==
=== Miss Philadelphia ===
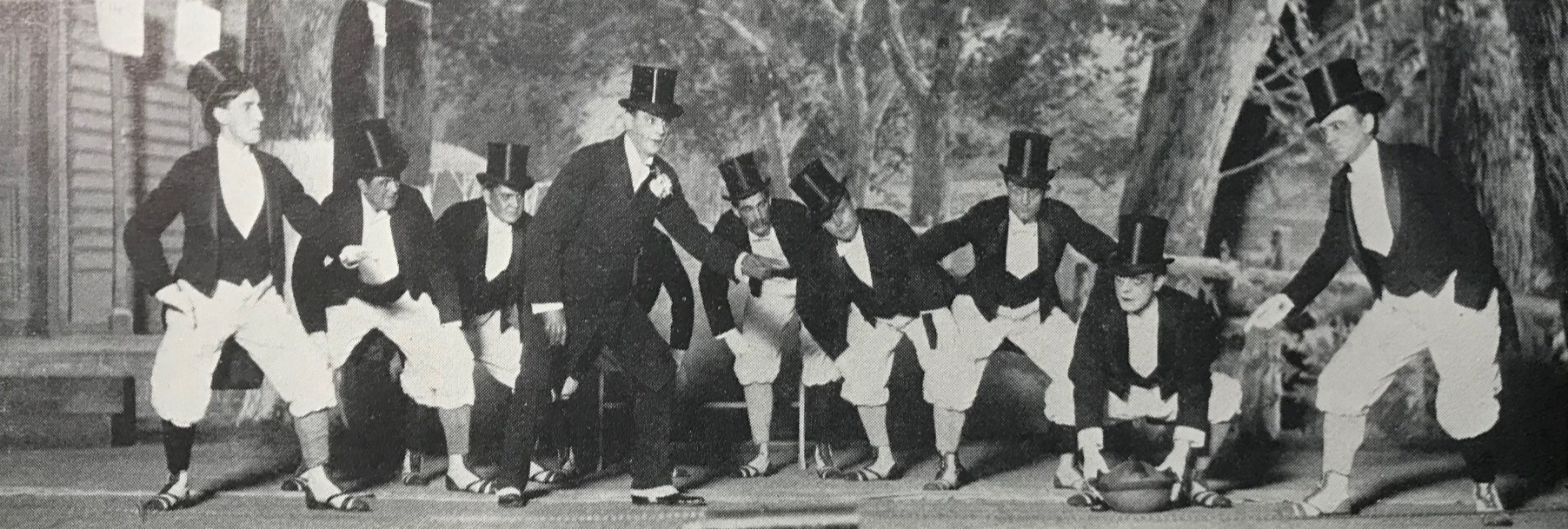
Miss Philadelphia 1895

“If anybody were to ask me to what do I attribute my first success as a theatrical manager and proprietor, I'd have to answer my genius at getting cash in exchange for pretty dubious checks was at the bottom of it.” —From Tyler's 1934 memoir Whatever Goes Up

After four years as an advance man, Tyler tried production with his friend Harry Askin. The two barely-solvent young men shared a room at a hotel on Walnut Street, and it was said whichever one got out of bed first was the better-dressed that day. They decided on mounting a revue, at that time a new type of entertainment, calling it Miss Philadelphia to capitalize on civic pride. Askin persuaded Edgar Smith to do the book and find a composer, while Tyler signed Nancy McIntosh for the lead at $150 a week. Through an extraordinary amount of check-kiting, (Note: At one point Tyler and Askin had three messenger boys riding trains from Philadelphia with bundles of cash to deposit at 9AM sharp at banks in other cities to make good their paper trail.), and a last minute supply of heelless pumps for the men's chorus from an undertaker, (Note: "The chorus didn't take to the idea very kindly", wrote Tyler, but came opening night and the Miss Philadelphia boys were "singing and dancing as lively as all get out in dead men's shoes".) Miss Philadelphia came off successfully. Realizing their kiting meant no profits could be expected, Askin gave his ownership half to Tyler and departed town. Tyler sold their interest in the show, using the sale price to pay their hotel bill, and left for New York.

=== Nancy Lee ===
Tyler purchased an operetta called Nancy Lee, with the idea of again using civic pride to boost a show, this time in Baltimore. He secured a contract with Ned Hanlon, manager of the Baltimore Orioles, to stage benefits for that club using Nancy Lee. On the strength of that contract he borrowed $3000 to mount the performances. He signed Digby Bell to front the opera company, and made sure ballpark fans knew about the upcoming benefits. The scheme worked well in Baltimore, but when Tyler took the show to other cities, Nancy Lee on its own was a weak draw. Stranded in Washington, D.C., the company needed to get to Atlanta where a big exposition meant a ready-made audience awaited. Tyler was able to tap Marc Klaw for the travelling funds, (Note: Tyler used an underhanded tactic against Klaw, who was staying under an assumed name in a hotel that normally would not accept Jewish guests. Tyler greeted Klaw loudly by his real name in the lobby, while Klaw frantically tried to shush him. Though he considered Klaw a friend, Tyler had 65 people needing transport to Atlanta, and so shook him down for $300.) and Nancy Lee cleaned up in Atlanta. Instead of closing the show, Tyler's unquenchable optimism drove him to take Nancy Lee on the road through the South and the Midwest. Somehow it stumbled along, never making more money than to enable a train ride to the next town, until December 1895, when Digby Bell abandoned the show and Tyler had to close it down.

=== The Forest of Arden ===
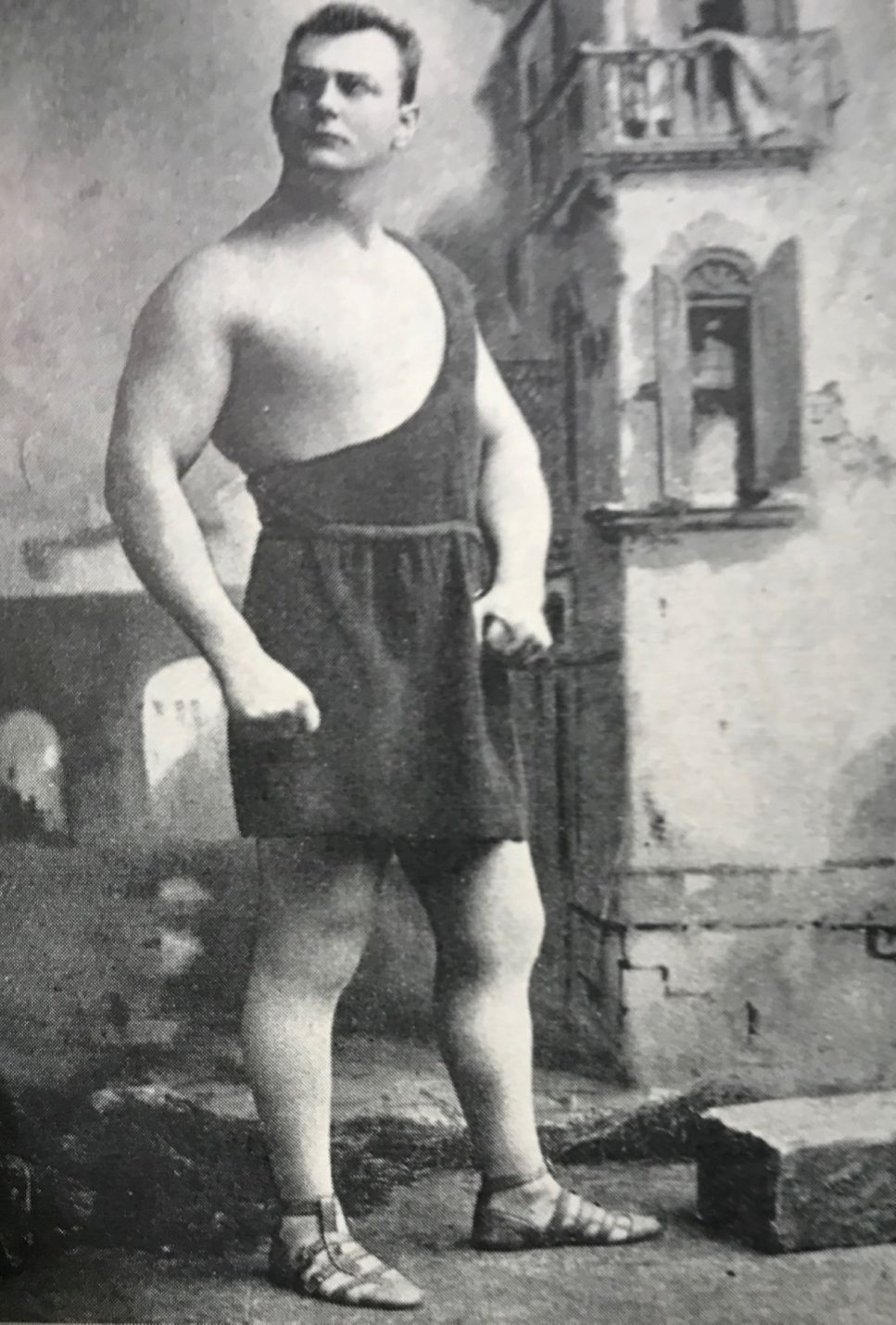
William Muldoon 1896

On August 2, 1896, Tyler produced an outdoor version of As You Like It. This was a one-time performance at Deal Lake, near Asbury Park, New Jersey. The area still had rustic woods at that time, according to Tyler. He engaged Mrs. Emily Fernandez to recruit some performers, including her daughter Bijou Fernandez as Phebe, and William Muldoon as Charles the Wrestler. Tyler himself signed Marie Wainwright as Rosalind, and Camille D'Arville in a trouser role as Amiens. By threatening to take the production to nearby Long Branch, Tyler coerced Founder Bradley, owner of the Coleman House resort on Deal Lake, into paying for building an outdoor stage.

However, the lead actors refused to go on until they received at least part of their salary. Tyler handed out his remaining cash in $100 allotments, but had nothing left by the time he got to Camille D'Arville. She balked, and so As You Like It was performed without Amiens and the songs. Newspaper accounts said the performance otherwise came off well, but that during Act II, Tyler and Mrs. Fernandez tussled over the box office cash, which amounted to no more than $900. Realizing he was in a hole for $2000, Tyler literally took to the woods at 10pm and kept going, leaving behind cast, crew, and creditors to sort out the situation themselves. (Note: Of particular concern to him were reports that William Muldoon was making ominous remarks about what would happen when he found Tyler.) Arriving back at Manhattan, Tyler hid out in a friend's house for several weeks, until Charles Frohman came to his rescue, giving him a job as manager for Albert Chevalier's American tour.

== Liebler & Company ==
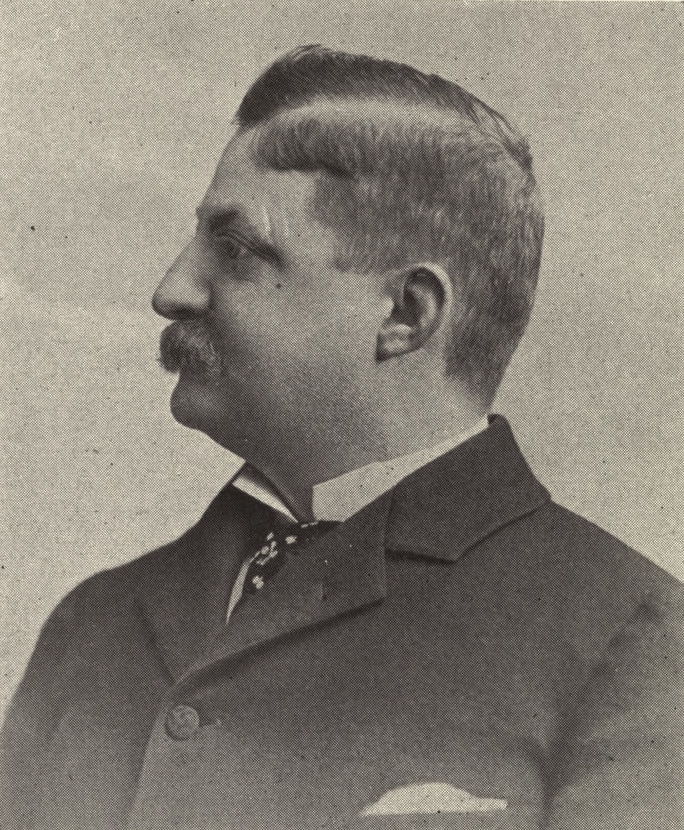
T. A. Liebler 1909

Tyler joined up with investor Theodore A. Liebler (1852-1941) to found Liebler & Company in 1898. They signed actress Viola Allen, who urged them to back a play by British author Hall Caine, titled The Christian. The Christian proved a huge success, enabling Liebler & Company to take a chance on Children of the Ghetto by Israel Zangwill. A ground-breaking stage work on Jewish life, it lost money, but Zangwill's next play for them more than made up for it. Tyler discovery Eleanor Robson starred in Merely Mary Ann, a huge hit on Broadway. Less well-received in Manhattan, but wildly popular elsewhere, was the Liebler production of Mrs. Wiggs of the Cabbage Patch. With Sag Harbor by James A. Herne, and Raffles, the Amateur Cracksman starring Kyrle Bellew, they propelled Liebler & Company to financial success by 1905. (Note: When Tyler signed Bellew to a contract for Raffles, he presented the performer with a gold watch containing the following inscription: "God bless Kyrle Bellew and make him a good actor, for George Tyler's sake. Amen.")

Though the company didn't bear his name, it was Tyler who managed the talent and productions. Liebler was strictly on the financial side of the partnership, and was never mentioned in newspaper reviews nor later in performer memoirs. Tyler travelled to Europe and North Africa each year, searching for new plays and unknown (to North America) talent. Tyler arranged American tours by Mrs. Patrick Campbell, Gabrielle Réjane, Eleonora Duse, W. B. Yeats and the Abbey Players of Dublin, (Note: In America at this time they were known as the Irish Players.) whose American debut of The Playboy of the Western World provoked controversy among Irish-American theater audiences. For 1910, he brought over from French North Africa fifty Arab, Berber, and French colonial inhabitants to lend authenticity to The Garden of Allah. Tyler and George Arliss came up with the idea that the latter should portray Benjamin Disraeli, and it was Tyler who later produced Louis N. Parker's Disraeli.

Liebler & Company also produced American plays as well, such as The Squaw Man with William Faversham, Salomy Jane by Paul Armstrong, The Man from Home by Booth Tarkington, and Alias Jimmy Valentine from a story by O. Henry. Liebler & Company's last big success was the spectacle Joseph and His Brethren in 1913. The following year, they attempted to mount an extravagant production, The Garden of Paradise by Edward Sheldon, but misjudged the economic situation arising from the start of World War I and the loss of revenue by their road companies to cinemas. Liebler & Company was placed into involuntary receivership on December 4, 1914.

== Independent producer ==
=== Pollyanna and talent management ===
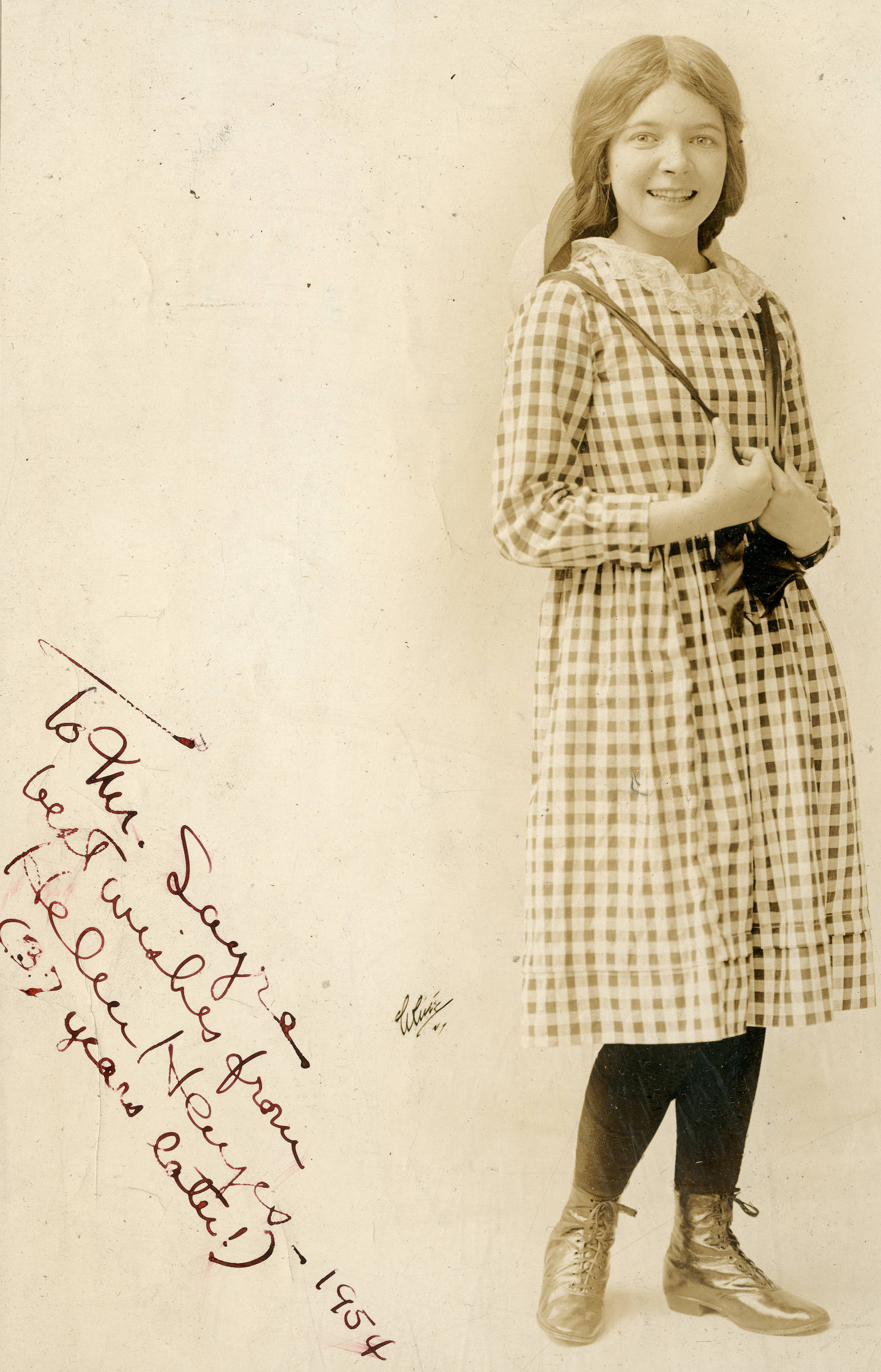
Helen Hayes as Pollyanna

After the failure of Liebler & Company, Tyler felt lost. He walked aimlessly for miles around Manhattan, until Abe Erlanger came to his rescue once more. Erlanger suggested Tyler work in association with him as an independent producer. Tyler agreed, taking on the job of producing Pollyanna in 1915, with financial backing from Klaw and Erlanger. A sentimental piece, Pollyanna was like Mrs. Wiggs, more popular on the road than on Broadway, though it ran well there in 1916.

For Tyler, the chief value of Pollyanna came when he hired a teenage actress from Washington, D.C. to play the lead in the road company. Helen Hayes Brown, who went by her middle name for billing, had been on stage since age five, but was little-known as yet. Tyler recognized her unique appeal, and was determined to broaden her cultural horizons to match her talent. Hayes wrote that though they never had a written contract, with Tyler she felt that at last she "had a professional home and some semblance of security". Tyler had her read the works of Dumas père and The French Revolution: A History by Thomas Carlyle, to prepare for her first trip to France. Dawdling in Paris with her mother, Hayes missed Tyler arranged meetings in England with J. M. Barrie and George Bernard Shaw. Shaw and Tyler were long time acquaintances, having first clashed in 1905 over Eleanor Robson, for whom Major Barbara had been written. Hayes would have a surfeit of Eleanor Robson recollections from Tyler, but her most successful performances for him would be in flapper roles. First, though, was the American production of Dear Brutus by Barrie, starring William Gillette. It was Barrie who had suggested Tyler look into producing Mrs. Wiggs back in 1903, so Tyler was willing to lend out Helen Hayes. Critic Heywood Broun was entranced with Hayes' performance in the dream daughter role, but rightly doubted Tyler's claim that she wasn't yet 18. (Note: "Miss Helen Hayes, who is not yet eighteen, and these are the official George Tyler figures, played the daughter, and Miss Hayes is as eager as Christmas morning and as dazzling as Christmas night. It may be that nobody will ever call her the great Miss Hayes, but if not she will have to grow out of an amazing equipment of natural charm and technical skill. She was on top of the tree last night.".)

=== Tarkington's plays ===
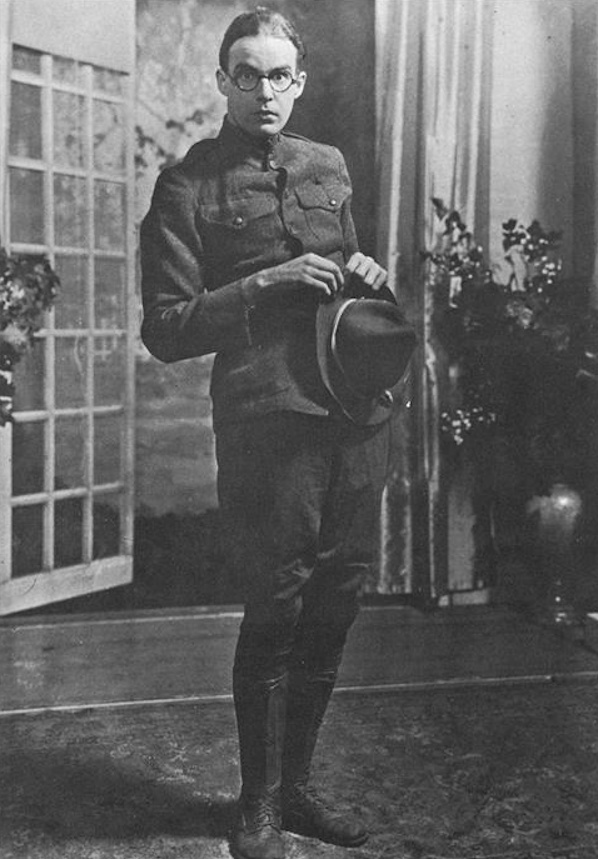
Alfred Lunt in Clarence

Booth Tarkington was an acclaimed novelist, but his attempts to write original plays had met with mixed results. Tyler produced his 1915 effort The Ohio Lady, which played the Midwest for six weeks then was withdrawn. Tarkington and Julian Street reworked it into The Country Cousin, which Tyler again produced, starring Alexandra Carlisle. President Wilson and former president Roosevelt both saw the play; Tyler would insert their laudatory remarks into newspaper ads. However, as with Pollyanna, the biggest benefit from Tyler's perspective came with casting the post-Broadway tour. Carlisle recommended a then unknown actor, Alfred Lunt, for the Boston engagement.

Tyler took on managing Lunt, and encouraged Tarkington to view his performance. Tarkington was inspired to write a vehicle for Lunt, titled Clarence, which would co-star Helen Hayes and Glenn Hunter. Clarence was a runaway hit on Broadway, playing for an entire season. Tyler launched a second company for Clarence in Chicago, starring Gregory Kelly and Ruth Gordon. However, he infuriated Helen Hayes by pulling her from Clarence and launching her in Bab, the penultimate flapper role, which made her a star.

Tarkington next wrote a political satire, Poldekin starring George Arliss, which Tyler produced on his own during 1920, Klaw and Erlanger having dissolved their partnership the year before. It proved unpopular, so Tyler pulled it after a few weeks on Broadway. At Helen Hayes insistence, Tyler replaced it with a Tarkington comedy, The Wren, which gave her a more adult role. Despite leading man Leslie Howard, The Wren did not fly. Tyler, to protect his investment in Hayes' career, quickly switched her to a popular comedy by Sidney Toler, Golden Days.

=== Eugene O'Neill ===
When his youngest son Eugene began writing plays, James O'Neill would bring them to Tyler for comment. Tyler had known the future playwright since infancy, but said in his memoir that he didn't really read those early works. Instead, he just gave O'Neill senior some general encouragement about his son's efforts. Later, when Eugene O'Neill was already an acknowledged success, Tyler did work with him on two plays, one of which he produced on Broadway.

Chris Christopherson was the original title for what would become Anna Christie. During the summer of 1919, Eugene O'Neill and Tyler exchanged correspondence on the play concerning the ending. O'Neill acknowledged Tyler's suggestion that it be reworked, but eventually revised the entire focus of the drama, by which time Tyler had dropped out of the picture.

The Straw was the only O'Neill play that Tyler produced. O'Neill's correspondence with Tyler pointed up the playwright's determination to evoke the actual atmosphere of a Tuberculosis sanitorium, despite Tyler's insistence the repeated coughing was a distraction. The Straw was staged by and originally meant to star John Westley, but he abruptly quit before opening night. Otto Kruger replaced him at the last moment, and was judged to have done well by reviewer Alexander Woollcott. However, Woollcott thought Margalo Gilmore was "beyond her depth in the more critical role". Opening on Broadway during November 1921, The Straw lasted only two weeks.

=== Kaufman and Connelly ===
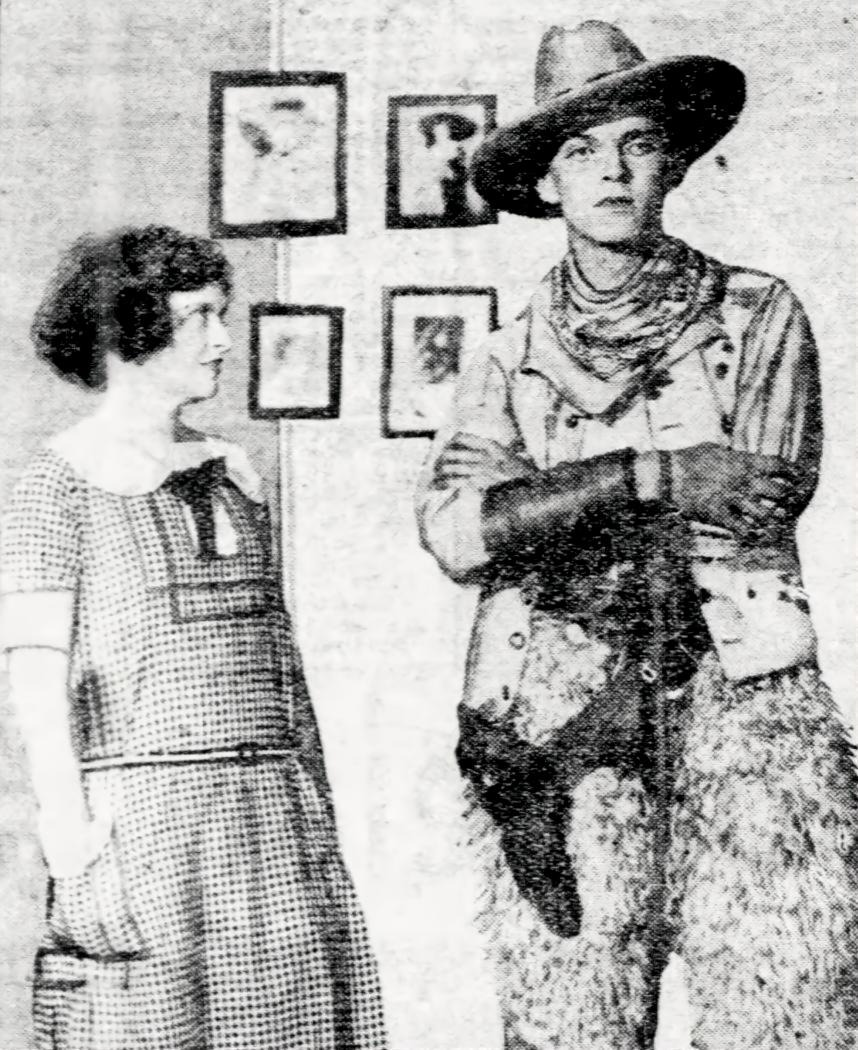
Florence Nash and Glenn Hunter in Merton of the Movies

George S. Kaufman was a drama critic when Tyler gave him his first playwriting assignment, to add a part for Lynn Fontanne in Some One in the House, by Larry Evans and Walter Percival. Impressed with Kaufman's work, Tyler then offered him a commission to write an entire play for Fontanne. Kaufman accepted, but only if he could have Marc Connelly as a collaborator. The play they wrote, Dulcy had opening engagements in the Midwest before it ran on Broadway for 246 performances during 1921-1922. Even before Dulcy finished its run on Broadway, Kaufman and Hart's second play for Tyler, To the Ladies debuted there in February 1922. Starring Helen Hayes and Otto Kruger, it ran through to June 1922.

Tyler agreed to produce for Kaufman and Connelly a musical revue called The Forty-Niners in November 1922. They directed this series of sketches and songs, written by themselves and others, (Note: The credited authors included Ring Lardner, Heywood Broun, Dorothy Parker, Franklin P. Adams, Robert C. Benchley, Montague Glass, Morrie Ryskind, and Deems Taylor.) but it fell flat in the opinion of Alexander Woollcott. Kaufman and Connelly's most successful play for Tyler, Merton of the Movies, also premiered the same month on Broadway. Tyler co-produced it with his old Liebler & Company colleague, Hugh Ford, who also staged it. An adaptation of the Harry Leon Wilson novel, the comedy starred Florence Nash and Glenn Hunter in a Hollywood satire. The production lasted eleven months on Broadway, running to nearly 400 performances.

Kaufman and Connelly's last collaboration with Tyler was a 1923 work called The Deep Tangled Wildwood, a light satire on rural comedies. Hugh Ford again co-produced and staged the work. Critic Arthur Pollock said the jokes were good but there was little else to the play; it was withdrawn after two weeks on Broadway.

=== Talent mismanagement ===
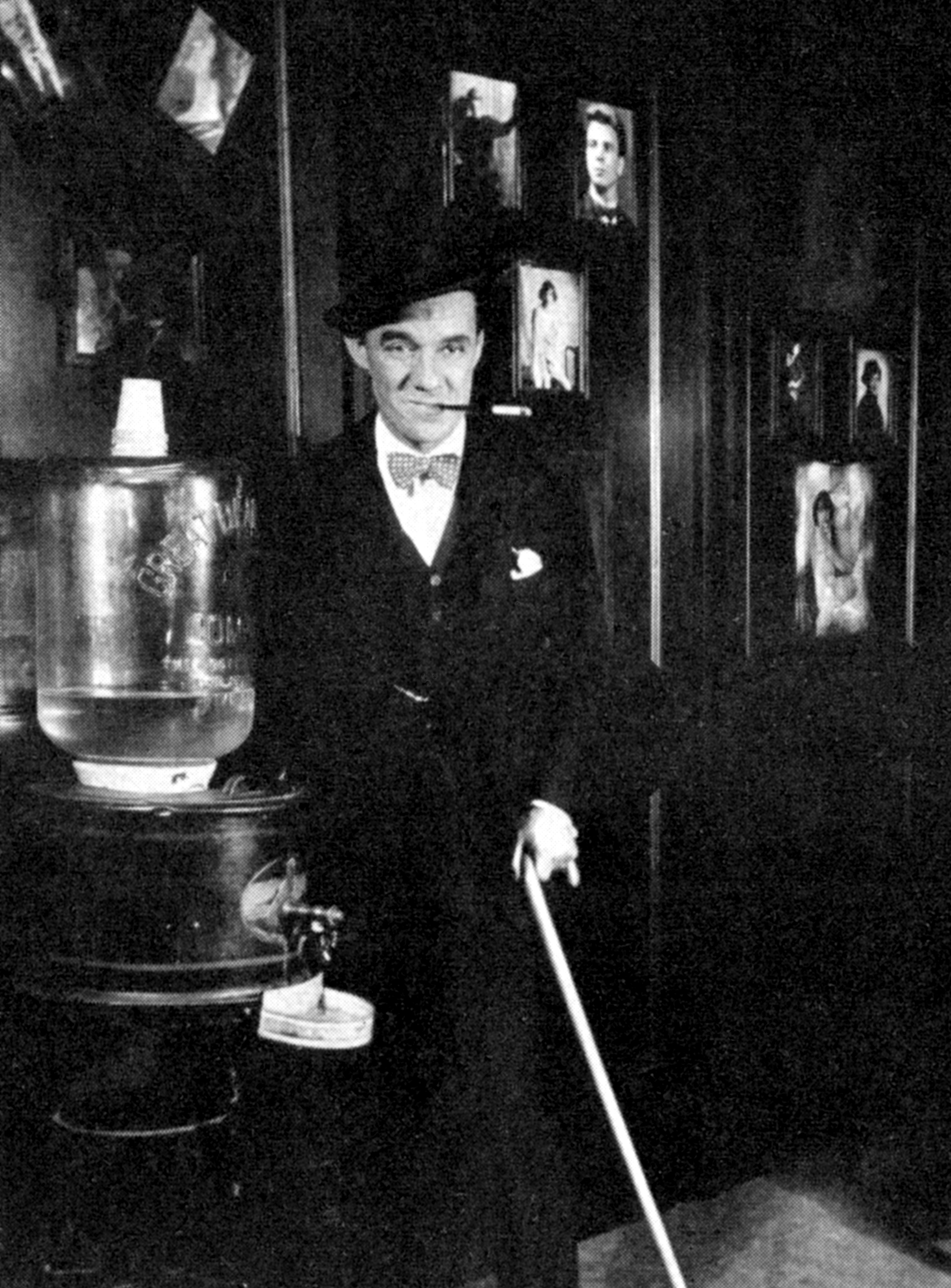
Gregory Kelly in The Butter and Egg Man

“Gregory wrote a letter. Money refunded. What couldn't get refunded was our wariness of Mr. Tyler. If it had been Klaw and Erlanger or the Shuberts we'd have been on guard, but rosy-cheeked, blue-eyed, plump Mr. Tyler? It was like distrusting your grandfather, who turned out to be Foxy Grandpa.” —From My Side: The Autobiography of Ruth Gordon

Tyler had no interest in making films, preferring the living theater for his medium. Helen Hayes called him a "19th Century gentleman", who "trailed a courtliness and refinement of taste", but who with his "goggles and duster", was already an anachronism in the 1920s. His benevolent despotism and antipathy to organized labor, despite having been a member of the printer's union, cost him the management of Helen Hayes. Resentful at having to join the Actors' Fidelity League at Tyler's insistence, she was urged by her friends Humphrey Bogart, Helen Menken, and Ethel Barrymore to join Actors' Equity Association instead. Hayes was reluctant to cross Tyler, until John Halliday told her that Tyler had favored Lynn Fontanne over herself for a role opposite him. Hayes gave in to her friends' urging to leave Fidelity for Equity despite Tyler's threat to cut her off. They parted ways after presenting Loney Lee, a comedy by Sophie Treadwell, in a November 1923 tryout.

In his memoir, Tyler acknowledged his mishandling of Kaufman and Connolly. He wrote that Booth Tarkington had warned him not to interfere with the duo's creative bent, that he should just let them go at it. Tyler, however, couldn't resist trying to channel them into what he thought they should do, and lost them as well. Despite their break, Kaufman in The Butter and Egg Man (1925) created protagonist Peter Jones, who is a cheerfully optimistic fellow from Chillicothe, Ohio, ready to splurge money on the stage. Reviewer Burns Mantle identified this character as "a young George Tyler".

=== Notable later productions ===
From 1925 through 1935 Tyler would produce, often with Abe Erlanger's financial backing, two dozen Broadway plays, of which nine were revivals of stage classics. His original productions included the first play by John Van Druten, Young Woodley. Banned in the UK, it was first performed on Broadway in November 1925, directed by Basil Dean, and starring Glenn Hunter and Helen Gahagan. Burns Mantle judged both stars gave excellent performances, but also reported that "a considerable number of unpleasantly frank lines have been cut from the script". It ran through June 1, 1926 for 260 performances.

Tyler and Basil Dean teamed up again for the American debut of The Constant Nymph in December 1926. Already a hit in London, it starred Glenn Anders and Beatrix Thomson. It ran through April 16, 1927, for 148 performances. Houseparty was produced by Tyler and Abe Erlanger in September 1929. Set during a fraternity house party at Williams College, it featured Harriet MacGibbon, whose character's accidental death is taken for murder. It lasted through February 1, 1930, for 173 performances. (Note: The 171 performances listed in the Daily News plus the matinee and evening performance for that day.)

== Last years ==
=== Memoirs ===
As his production career wound down Tyler's memoirs, written in collaboration with J. C. Furnas, a theatrical journalist and biographer, began appearing in the Saturday Evening Post starting in January 1934. During the same month Booth Tarkington revealed in an interview that the character of the theatrical manager in his novel Presenting Lily Mars was based on Tyler.

The memoirs were expanded and published in book form as Whatever Goes Up–: The Hazardous Fortunes of a Natural Born Gambler by the Bobbs-Merrill Company in April 1934. Booth Tarkington wrote an introduction for it and received the dedication in return. The Indianapolis News reviewer said: "Mr. Tyler evidently knew everybody. He talks about stage folk informally and entertainingly. In fact, his book is not the least 'literary'. It reads like an evening of conversation with the producer, for its style is racy, full of slang, and permeated with good nature".

=== Columnist and last production ===
The popularity of his memoirs led to Tyler writing a brief column of theatrical reminiscences, which appeared daily in the New York Daily News. Entitled I Remember, I Remember, it started running on September 10, 1934, and finished up on January 3, 1935. In November of that year, he launched his last Broadway production, a comedy called For Valor, about a quiet small-town store clerk who becomes a decorated hero during World War I. Written by Martha Hedman and Henry Arthur House, and starring Frank Craven and June Walker with a large featured cast, it was judged disappointing by critics, and closed after one week.

=== Coda ===
As late as 1940, Tyler maintained an office on Broadway at the New Amsterdam Theatre, though his last Broadway production had been For Valor (1935). When asked whether ticket speculation was causing lower theatre attendance, he instead pointed to the modern emphasis on plays and playwriters over star performers as a cause. According to a report, he was afflicted in his last years with severe arthritis, which prevented him from writing.

Tyler died at the McKinney Sanitarium in Yonkers, New York on March 13, 1946. His obituary in The New York Times credited him with having produced at least 350 productions during his career. There were no funeral services in New York City; his body was shipped to Chillicothe for burial.

== Personal life ==
Tyler married Cora Parson, age 21, at Chicago on April 7, 1892. The San Francisco Chronicle mentioned the marriage in passing, identifying her as a resident of that city. The couple had met there while he was working for O'Neill; she was a school teacher. Their breakup in November 1892 occurred when Tyler discovered she was having an affair with Mortimer F. Taylor. He was a major backer of the show currently employing Tyler as advance agent. The Evening World printed letters from the lovers and details from eyewitnesses, which other newspapers across the country picked up. Tyler and his wife filed suits for divorce against each other, after which the affair fell out of the public eye.

Tyler was reticent about his personal life in his memoir, which focused on his work. He makes no mention of his brief marriage, nor his sister Edith, though she lived with him in Manhattan from at least 1900, and served as his social hostess until her accidental death in 1937.

== Bibliography ==
- Robert Grau. Forty Years Observation of Music and the Drama. Broadway Publishing Company, 1909.
- George C. Tyler and J. C. Furnas. Whatever Goes Up. Bobbs-Merrill Company, Indianapolis, 1934.
- Helen Hayes and Sandford Dody. On Reflection: An Autobiography. M. Evans and Company, 1968.
- Ruth Gorden. My Side: The Autobiography of Ruth Gordon. Harper & Row, 1976. ISBN 0-06-011618-8.
- Jackson R. Bryer and Travis Bogard (eds). Selected Letters of Eugene O'Neill. Limelight Editions, 1994. ISBN 9780879101817.
- Robert M. Fells. George Arliss: The Man Who Played God. Scarecrow Press, 2004.
