= Reinold (surname) =

Reinold is a surname. Notable people with the surname include:

- Arnold William Reinold (1843–1921), English physicist
- Bernard A. Reinold (1860–1940), American stage actor
- Dominic Reinold (1989), German former professional footballer
- Elina Reinold (1971), Estonian actress
