= Deburau =

Play

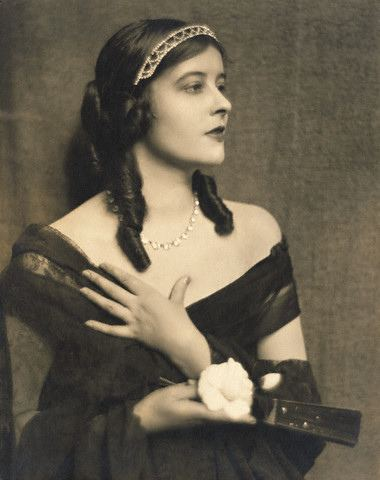
- Elsie Mackay as Marie Duplessis in 1920 Broadway production
- Original language: French
- Written by: Sacha Guitry

Premiere
- Date: February 9, 1918 Théâtre du Vaudeville, Paris; December 23, 1920 Belasco Theatre, New York; November 11, 1921 Ambassadors Theatre, London

Deburau is a 1918 French play by Sacha Guitry that also played on Broadway in a translation by Harley Granville-Barker at the Belasco Theatre in 1920–21 and at the Ambassadors Theatre in London in 1921.

== Background ==
The play debuted on February 9, 1918, at the Théâtre du Vaudeville. Burns Mantle writes in The Best Plays of 1920-21 that Guitry had to withdraw the play due to World War I shells starting to drop within blocks of the theatre, but that the play had already been such a success that there was "lively bidding" for the American rights to a translated version that Harley Granville-Barker had made for Charles B. Cochran.

In America, after an out-of-town warmup in Washington, the play debuted at the Belasco Theatre on December 23, 1920. Mantle writes that it "immediately took its place, not only as one of the fine plays of this particular season, but as one of the most impressively and beautifully staged plays the American stage has ever known." Belasco, however, decided not to take the play on the road due to the cost of doing so, also reporting that the entire production in New York was also going to be a loss. The New York production required actors and staff totaling 126 (plus two children) to be staged.

In London, Granville-Barker's translation debuted at the Ambassadors Theatre on November 3, 1921, and played through November 26 (28 perf.) It was the stage debut for Ivor Novello. Robert Loraine played Deburau.

== Revivals and adaptations ==
The 1924 silent film The Lover of Camille is an adaptation of the play. The 1951 French film of the same name is also based on the play, with Sacha Guitry both directing and reprising his lead role.

It has been revived a number of times in France, including in 1950 and 1980.

== 1920 Broadway cast ==
- Lionel Atwill as Jean-Gaspard Deburau
- Elsie Mackay as Marie Duplessis
- Bernard A. Reinold as Monsieur Bertrand
- Hubert Druce as Robilard
- Joseph Herbert as Laurent
- Rowland Buckstohe as Laplace
- Margot Kelly as Justine
- Pauline Merriam as Madame Robard
- Marie Bryar as Clara
- Isabel Leighton as Honorine
- Edmund Gurney as Clement
- Sidney Toler as The "Barker"
- Helen Reimer as The Money Taker
- Lylia Burnand as The Unknown Lady
- St. Clair Bayfield as A Journalist
- Eden Gray as The Lady with the Lorgnette
- Morgan Farley as Charles Deburau
- John L. Shine as A Doctor
