= Elsie Mackay (actress) =

Australian actress (1893–1963)

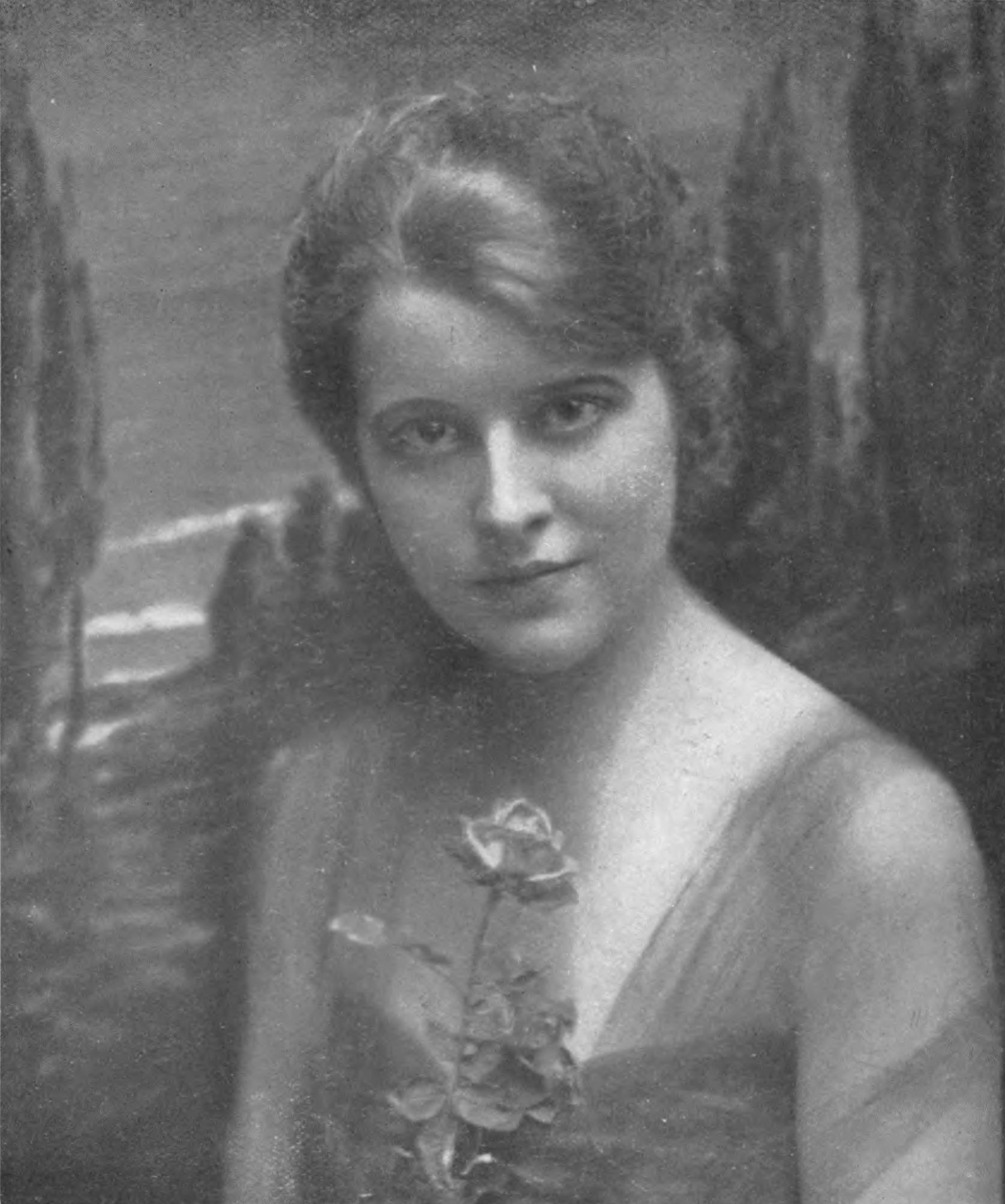
- The Stage Yearbook 1917
- Born: Elsie Gertrude Mackay; 20 February 1893; Roebourne, Western Australia
- Died: 6 February 1963 (aged 69); Melbourne, Australia, Australia
- Occupation: Actress
- Spouses: Lionel Atwill (m. 1920; div. 1928) Max Montesole (m. 1933; died 1942) James Stanley Smith (m.1957-1963)
- Father: Samuel Peter Mackay

Elsie Gertrude Mackay (20 February 1893 – 6 February 1963) was an Australian-born actress who appeared on stage in the United States and Britain between 1914 and the early 1930s, and after 1934 performed on radio in Australia.

== Stage career ==
Mackay was born on 20 February 1893 in Roebourne, Western Australia, to wealthy pastoralist Samuel Peter Mackay and Florence Gertrude Mackay of Mundabullangana Station.

Mackay's education was completed at a finishing school in Switzerland. In 1910 her father remarried and her new step-mother was actress Fanny Dango. Dango's relatives Millie Hylton and George Grossmith Jr introduced her to the London stage. On 19 April 1914 she became understudy to Mrs. Patrick Campbell.

She became a player in the Cyril Maude Company, touring the United States in 1915. In 1916, she joined Herbert Beerbohm Tree's company on its tour of the United States, consistently taking the role of leading ladies and acting under the direction of David Belasco.

Mackay's US stage career included:

- A Woman's Name,
- Grumpy at Hollis Street Theatre, Boston. 27 March 1915–16.
- Colonel Newcome 1917

On Broadway she performed in:

- Another Man's Shoes, 1918, where she replaced Alma Tell as Lionel Atwill's leading woman,
- A Well-Remembered Voice, 1919
- As You Like It, as Rosalind 1919,
- Clarence, as Violet Pinney 1919,
- Poldekin, as Maria 1920,

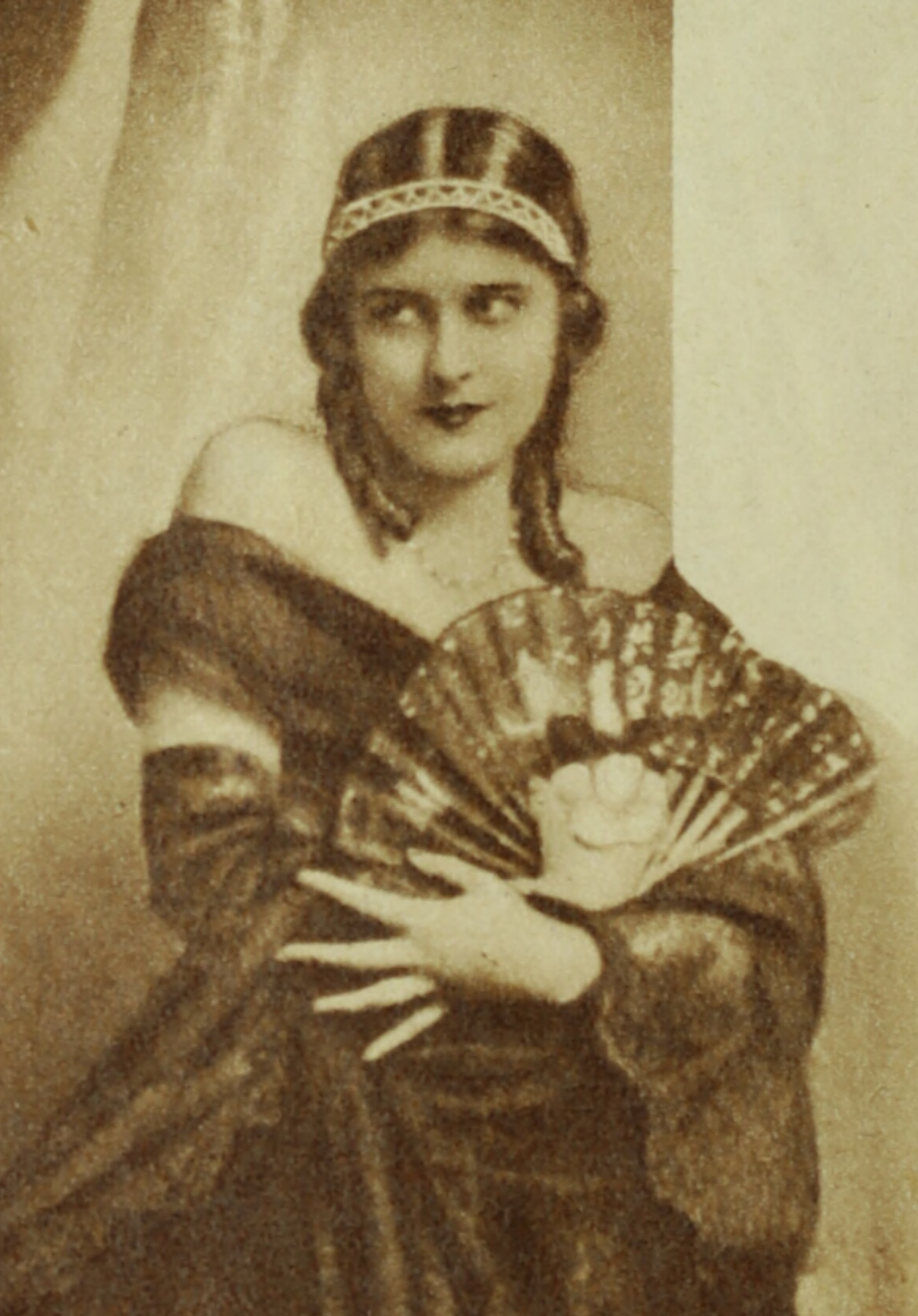
The Wireless Weekly, (20 November 1936)

- Deburau, as Marie Duplessis, 1921,
- The White-Faces Fool, 1922

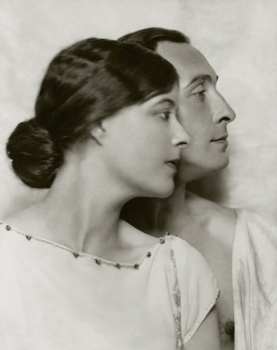
Mackay and Atwill, promoting The White-Faced Fool, 1922

- The Comedian, as Jacqueline, 1923,
- The New Gallantry, 1925.

Her only film role was the female lead in the silent comedy Nothing But the Truth opposite Taylor Holmes. Motion Picture News of Jan-Feb 1920 noted it was her first film but reported that she "does not register... a screen personality. She appeared somewhat camera conscious... and did not photograph well."

In December 1933 she returned to Australia with her English-born second husband, actor Max Montesole. Together the two gave recital tours and were in radio theatre.

== Personal life ==
In 1920 Mackay became the second wife of actor Lionel Atwill.

Mackay and Montesole married in 1933 at St. Germans, Cornwall, England. The couple moved to Australia in late 1933 where they worked together, often on radio. Montesole died in Perth in 1942. Elsie married James Stanley Smith in 1957. She died in Hawthorn, Victoria, Australia in 1963 as Elsie Gertrude Smith. She was buried with her father, brother Peter and her stepmother Fanny Dango.

== Links ==
- Elsie Mackay at IMDb
- Nick Murphy, , at the Forgotten Australian Actors website, 7 April 2018
- Elsie Mackay at the Internet Broadway Database
- Elsie Mackay at Playbill Vault
