= Bab (play) =

1920 play by Edward Childs Carpenter

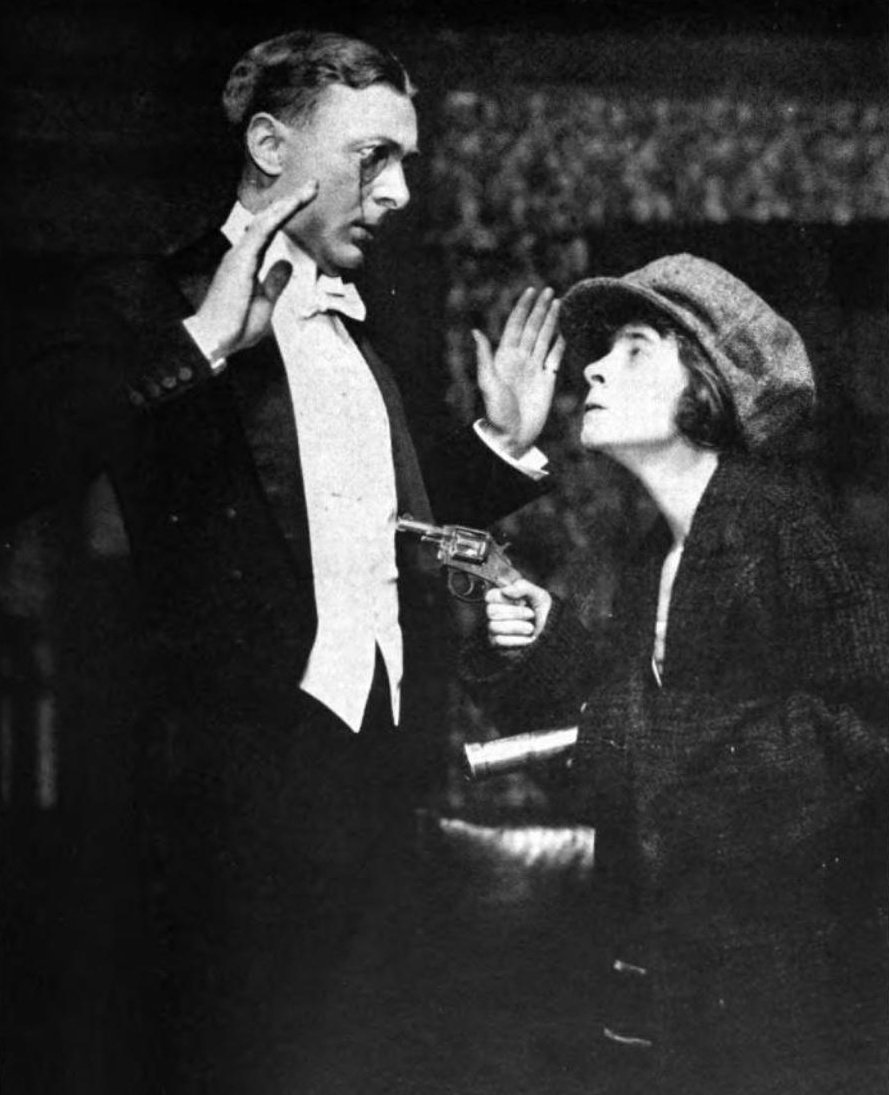
- Arthur Eldred and Helen Hayes
- Original language: English
- Written by: Edward Childs Carpenter
- Based on: Bab: A Sub-Deb (1917) by Mary Roberts Rinehart
- Subject: Imaginative flapper outwits herself
- Genre: Comedy
- Setting: The Archibald's country home and boathouse

Premiere
- Date: October 18, 1920
- Place: Park Theatre
- Directed by: Ignacio Martinetti

Bab is a 1920 play by Edward Childs Carpenter, based on a 1916 series of magazine stories by Mary Roberts Rinehart, collected into book form in 1917. It is a four-act comedy that leans towards farce, with five scenes, two settings, and eleven characters. The action of the play takes place over four weeks time in late Spring. The story concerns events in the life of Barbara "Bab" Archibald, a "sub-deb", a girl in the year before she makes her debut in society.

The play was produced by George C. Tyler and Arthur Hopkins, staged by Ignacio Martinetti, with Helen Hayes as the female lead. It had tryouts in Boston and Baltimore then premiered on Broadway during October 1920. It ran three months on Broadway and could have gone longer, but was forced to go on tour by prior scheduling and a lack of unteneted Manhattan theaters.

It had been preceded by a 1917 trilogy of silent films based on the Bab stories, all now lost.

== Characters ==
Characters are listed in order of appearance within their scope.

Lead

- Barbara Archibald, called Bab is 17, quick-witted and lively, unafraid to speak her mind.

Supporting

- James Archibald is Bab's wealthy father; generous and likable, but worried about fortune-hunters.
- Clara Archibald is Bab's mother, fussy and stern guardian of her younger daughter's behavior.
- Leila Archibald is 20, Bab's sister, less lively and worried her beau will be stolen by Bab.
- Carter Brooks is a neighbor, a college-trained civil engineer and army veteran, but not working as yet.
- Clinton Beresford is an English "Honourable", enamored of Leila, of uncertain financial status.

Featured

- William is the elderly butler to the Archibalds, whose tenure allows him to express opinions.
- Hannah is Mrs. Archibald's middle-aged upstairs maid, who openly reports on Bab to her mother.
- Jane Raleigh is 17; she looks up to her friend Bab and is shocked by her at the same time.
- Eddie Perkins is 16, the Archibald's next door neighbor, a bit foolish and gone on Bab.
- Guy Grosvenor is Carter's actor friend from college, who is pretending to be Harold Valentine.

Off stage

- Harold Valentine is an imaginary boyfriend made up by Bab to spite her mother.
- Great Aunt Veronica is the family dragon who lives in Philadelphia and the 19th Century.

== Synopsis ==
The play was colored by the then recent passage of the Volstead Act, which lent possession of alcohol an illicit air, and mention of drinking a clandestine glamor.

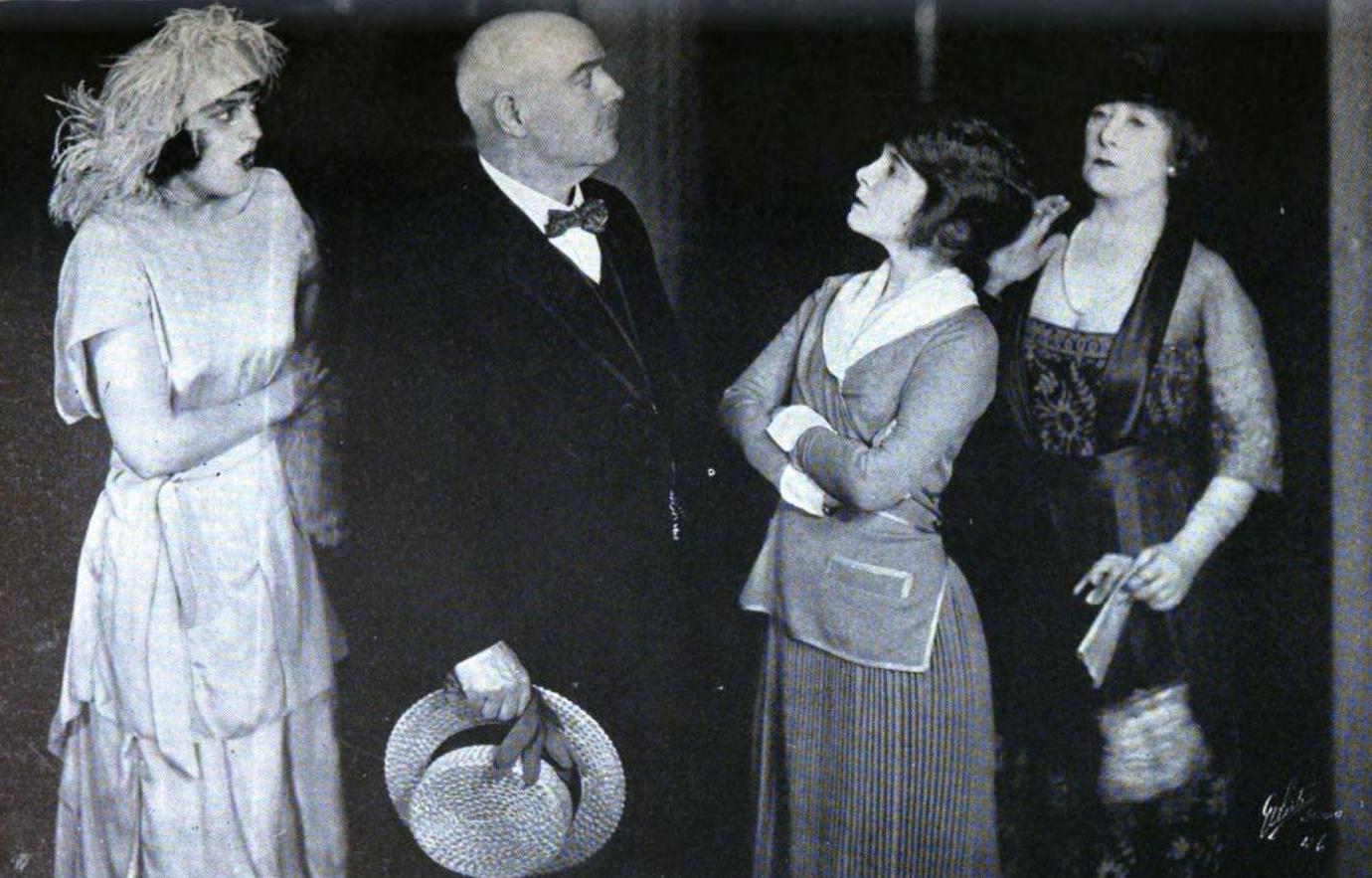

Act I (The library at the Archibald's country house. An afternoon late in May.) Bab's school has shut due to an outbreak of measeles, so she has returned home. A family crisis has occurred over Leila inviting Clinton Beresford, whom her father detests, for the weekend. Carter Brooks and James Archibald are dragged to a tea party with Mrs. Archibald and Leila. While they're gone, Jane Raleigh comes over. Bab opens her suitcase to show Jane a play she wrote at school, but it turns out to be filled with men's clothing and a whisky bottle. Bab realizes she mixed up suitcases with a young man on the train. William brings that young man, holding Bab's suitcase, into the library. He turns out to be Beresford. Bab is incensed when her mother nixes attendance at a party for Beresford. Bab decides to invent a lover named Harold Valentine, to display her maturity, and enlists Eddie Perkins' help in carrying out the deception. (Curtain)

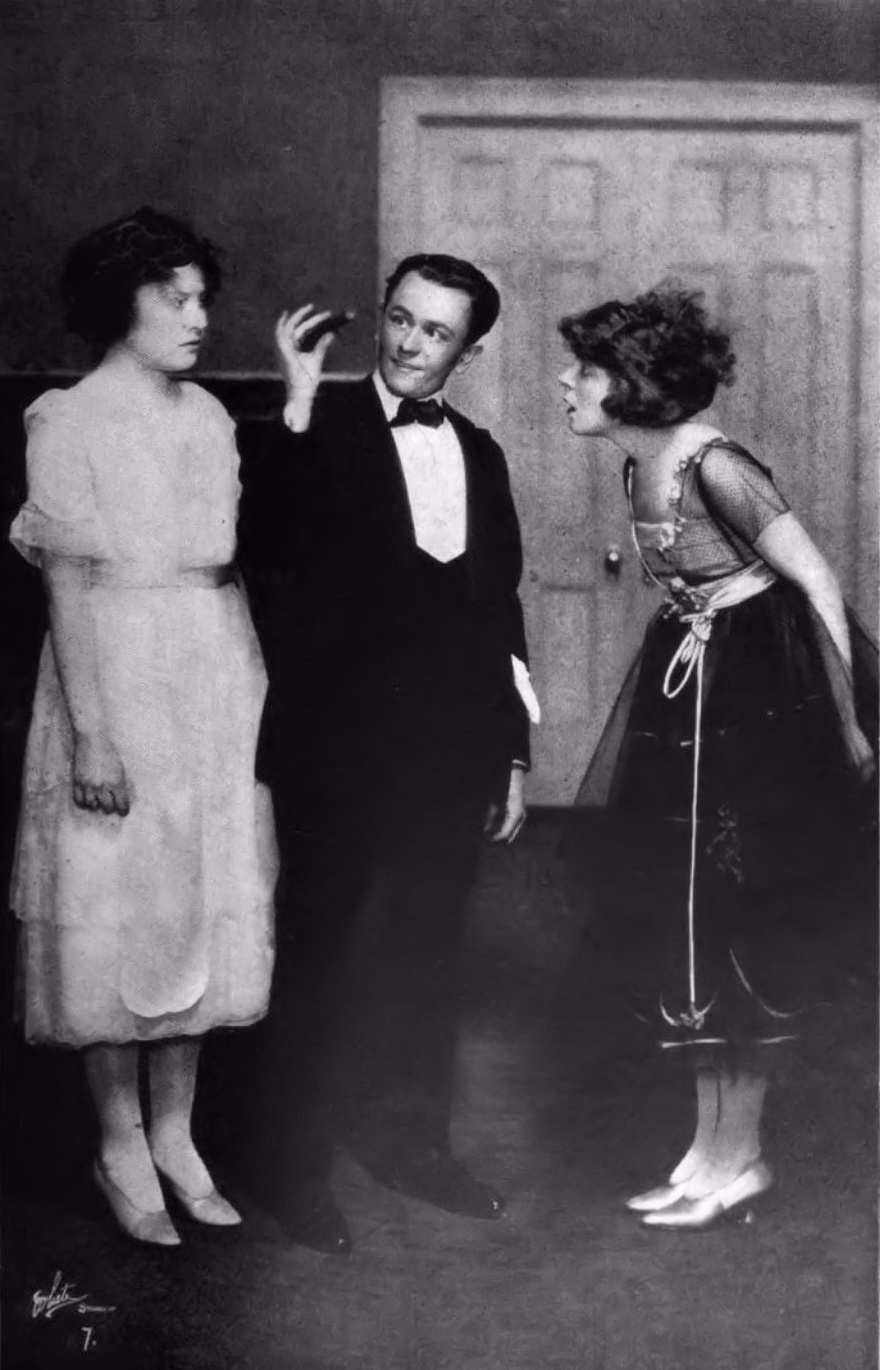

Act II (Scene 1:Same as Act I. The next day.) Bab returns home from a store with a postcard photo of a handsome young man. She inscribes the photo as if he had given it to her, and "hides" it in the library. She then writes a letter to "Harold Valentine", including a love poem, and addresses the envelope. She asks Hannah to mail it, knowing the maid will instead give it to her mother. Flowers arrive for Bab from "H" (sent by Eddie). Mrs. Archibald confronts Bab with the missive and burns the letter. She threatens to pack Bab off to Great Aunt Veronica. Carter finds the photo and recognizes the image; he quickly tumbles to Bab's scheme. He intercepts a second letter in which Bab suggests marriage with "Harold", intending to put more pressure on her mother. (Three Minute Curtain)

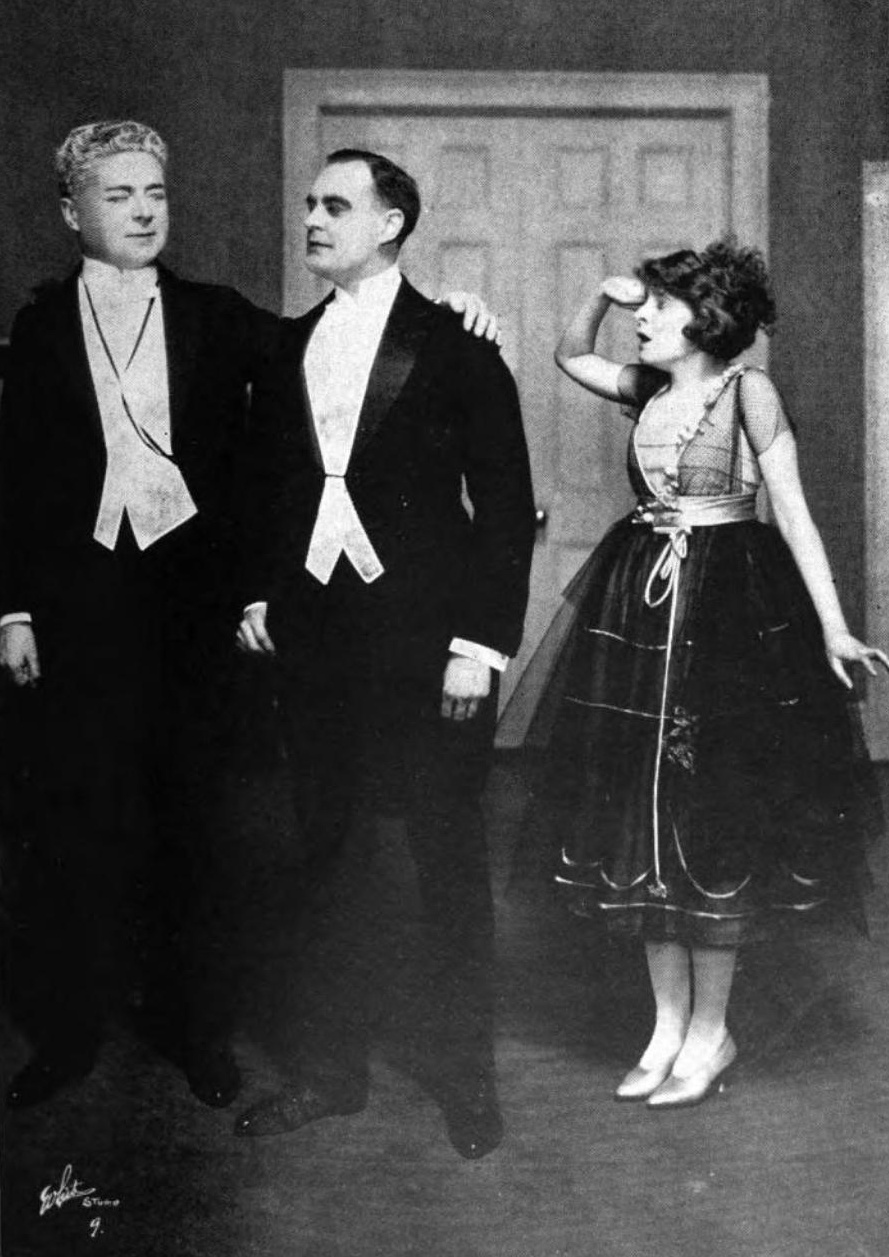

(Scene 2:Same as Act I. That night at 11pm.) Jane and Eddie are surprised to see Bab at the party, wearing Leila's old evening frock. Eddie, trying to act grownup in front of the girls, smokes a cigar and becomes ill. Carter arrives with a new guest: the young man in the photo! Carter tells an astonished Bab he has brought "Harold" just for her, but will tell everyone else he is Guy Grosvenor. Harold invites Bab to dance, pretending they are close, while she denies knowing him. Mr. Archibald, tipped off by Carter, puts his arm around "Harold" and pronounces him a fine young man, fit for joining a good family. Guy then asks to speak alone with Mr. Archibald, as if he were planning to ask for Bab's hand. Thoroughly alarmed, Bab realizes she must get back the letter. (Curtain)

Act III (Bachelor's Quarters in the Archibald Boathouse. Just before midnight.) Beresford, having retired to his guest quarters, (Note: Mr. Archibald's hospitality towards potential sons-in-law includes consigning them to a single room away from the main house.) is surprised to find an armed burglar in his room. Bab, wearing a shabby old cap and coat of her father, has come looking for the letter. She hadn't realized Guy and Beresford shared a room. After a talk, Bab learns Beresford has a contract from the British Government to award to Mr. Archibald's company, but didn't want to seem like he was trying to buy Leila. He helps Bab search Guy's things; the letter is found and destroyed. But Carter and Guy turn up, a bit snockered, and insist on Beresford joining them in a drink. Bab, hiding in a closet, hears the details of Carter's plan. Guy has called it off, afraid Bab might commit suicide if pushed any further. Suddenly there is a gunshot from the closet, shocking the three men. Pulled into the room, Bab is unhurt. She had sneezed, causing her to jerk the trigger. Her parents and Leila, alarmed by the gunshot, rush into the boathouse. Bab sneezes again; she has the measeles. (Curtain)

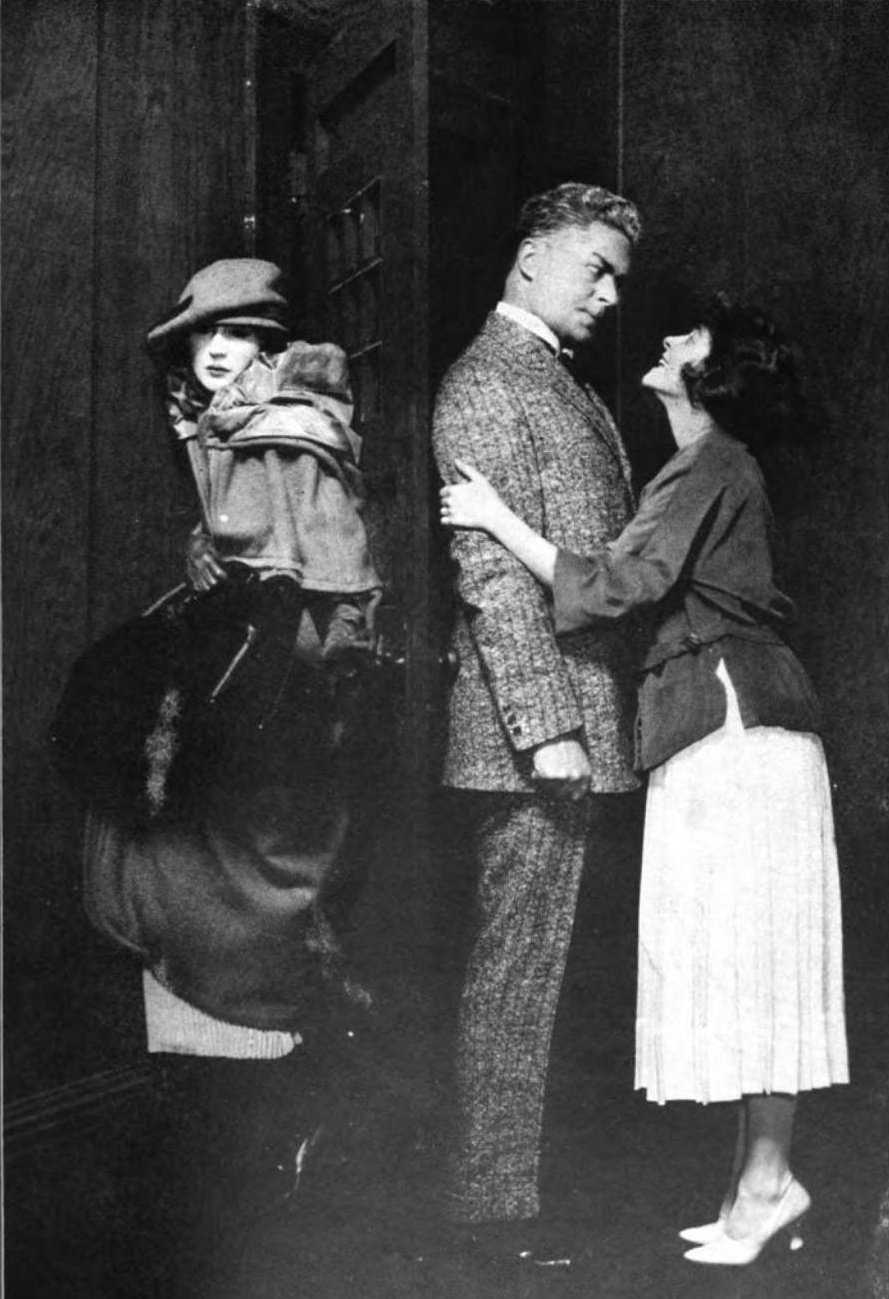

Act IV (Same as Act III. An afternoon, three weeks later.) Recovered from the measeles, Bab has been confined to the family property for her sins. She is determined on another scheme, Leila's elopement. A carefully worded message brings Beresford with the British Government contract options he holds. Bab briefs him on bringing a motorboat to the dock when he sees a signal flag go to half-mast. Jane and Eddie are to lower the flag when Leila enters the boathouse. But Bab's father comes in after Leila, whom Bab hastily conceals behind the door. Bab maneuvers her father so he no longer can see the doorway; Leila slips out unseen as the motorboat horn sounds. Mrs. Archibald now strolls in, guessing what happened. Bab mollifies her father with the contract options signed over to his company by Beresford. Carter comes to say goodbye; he is on his way to Poland, to help with its post-war reconstruction. Bab finally learns Carter loves her, but now must wait for his return. (Curtain)

== Original production ==
=== Background ===
Mary Roberts Rinehart had written four "Bab" stories for The Saturday Evening Post in 1916. Proving popular, they were collected into a book called Bab: A Sub-Deb (Note: The term "sub-deb" was invented by Rinehart.) in June 1917, which also included a previously unpublished story, "The G.A.C.". These stories were also the source for three silent films made that year, all starring Marguerite Clark: Bab's Diary, Bab's Burglar, and Bab's Matinee Idol.

George C. Tyler had signed Helen Hayes to a contract in 1916 with the road company of Pollyanna. Since then she had appeared under his management in the American adaptation of Dear Brutus and Clarence, among others. Bab was a natural fit for Hayes' flapper stage image at that time. For financial backing, Tyler teamed up with Arthur Hopkins, whom he had worked with before.

Helen Hayes said the cast of Clarence were happy working together, and that "the company was furious with Mr. Tyler" for moving her to Bab. She also claimed the actual first performance of Bab was in Taunton, Massachusetts, just before the Boston opening.

=== Cast ===
Cast from first performance through the Broadway run. The production was on hiatus from May 2 through September 26, and again from October 3 through October 17, 1920.
Role	Actor	Dates	Notes and sources
Bab	Helen Hayes	Feb 16, 1920 - Jan 01, 1921	
James Archibald	George Alison	Feb 16, 1920 - May 1, 1920	
James Archibald	Sam Edwards	Sep 27, 1920 - Jan 01, 1921	
Mrs. Archibald	Grace Henderson	Feb 16, 1920 - May 1, 1920	
Mrs. Archibald	Percy Haswell	Sep 27, 1920 - Jan 01, 1921	
Leila Archibald	Katherine Alexander	Feb 16, 1920 - May 1, 1920	
Leila Archibald	Edith King	Sep 27, 1920 - Jan 01, 1921	
Carter Brooks	Tom Powers	Feb 16, 1920 - Nov 27, 1920	Powers left the production for a play called Back Pay by Fannie Hurst.
Carter Brooks	Donald Gallaher	Nov 29, 1920 - Jan 01, 1921	
Clinton Beresford	Arthur Eldred	Feb 16, 1920 - Jan 01, 1921	
William	James Kearney	Feb 16, 1920 - Jan 01, 1921	
Hannah	Helen Gurney	Feb 16, 1920 - Jan 01, 1921	
Jane Raleigh	Clarabel Campbell	Feb 16, 1920 - May 1, 1920	
Jane Raleigh	Lillian Ross	Sep 27, 1920 - Jan 01, 1921	
Eddie Perkins	Junius Matthews	Feb 16, 1920 - May 1, 1920	
Eddie Perkins	Stephen Davis	Sep 27, 1920 - Jan 01, 1921	
Guy Grosvenor	Raymond Griffiths	Feb 16, 1920 - May 1, 1920	
Guy Grosvenor	Robert Hudson	Sep 27, 1920 - Jan 01, 1921	

=== Opening run and tryout ===
The first performance of Bab was given at the Hollis Street Theatre in Boston, on February 16, 1920. It was a resounding success, and ran through to May 1, 1920. According to local columnist Edward Harold Crosby, the old record for continuous performances at the Hollis Street Theatre was broken on April 10, 1920, when Hayes surpassed Maude Adams record of 64, which had stood for thirty years. Hayes herself was delighted with her critical reception and sudden personal popularity with Harvard's student body. She felt a bit like Zuleika Dobson, bewitching so many young college men.

After a long summer hiatus, the producers scheduled only one tryout for the new cast of Bab, a week-long engagement at the Academy Theatre in Baltimore, starting September 27, 1920. The local reviewer called the play "so light it is often non-essential" but said it was redeemed by the excellent cast, singling out Hayes, Tom Powers, Percy Haswell, and Sam Edwards.

=== Broadway premiere and reception ===
The Broadway premiere for Bab was delayed due to a shortage of available theaters. George C. Tyler decided to replace the underperforming political comedy Poldekin at the Park Theatre, in order to launch Bab on October 18, 1920. The critic for The Brooklyn Daily Times consistently called the play and character "Babs" throughout their review. (Note: This, and their recapitulation of the storyline, suggested an early departure from the theatre, if indeed they ever made it inside at all.) The reviewer for The New York Herald expressed admiration for a more complex work than a "flapper" play might suggest, and especially for Helen Hayes, who they estimated must have had seventy percent of spoken lines. They reported: "Her performance was a notably fine achievement in broad comedy. It had, moreover, minutes of subtlety". They also had praise for the supporting company and opined "The play is intended for the young".

Heywood Broun had fears that Helen Hayes would be trapped by popular parts like this, when her talent suggested she should be playing more challenging roles. (Note: Hayes was furious about Broun's review, particularly when he called her "cute". She later wrote: "I was shattered by Heywood Broun's evaluation of my performance. Shattered because I felt he was right, furious because he was right.") He felt the incidents of the play were more amusing than the whole, and had good words for the performances of Tom Powers, Lillian Ross, and Stephen Davis. The reviewer for The Brooklyn Daily Eagle concurred with Broun on supporting players Powers, Ross, and Davis. They made a comparison of playwright Edward Childs Carpenter's treatment of adolescence with Booth Tarkington's Seventeen and Clarence and judged the former did well and "crowded a large amount of good fun into his play", though "The whole thing lacks subtlety". Alexander Woollcott disagreed, saying that Carpenter's treatment suffered in comparison to Tarkington's. He also cautioned Helen Hayes on the perils of "overstriving" in a part, and suggested she look at her colleague Tom Powers, whose performance was one of masterful understatement.

=== Broadway closing ===
Despite its continuing popularity, the production was forced to close on New Year's Day, 1921. The Park Theatre had been previously reserved for a revival of Erminie, and no other Broadway theaters were available. Bab started on tour with Hayes and a slightly different cast in January 1921.

== Bibliography ==
- Mary Roberts Rinehart. Bab: A Sub-Deb. Doran, 1917.
- Edward Childs Carpenter. Bab: A Farcical Comedy in Four Acts. Samuel French, 1925.
- George C. Tyler and J. C. Furnas. Whatever Goes Up. Bobbs Merrill, 1934.
- Helen Hayes and Sandford Dody. On Reflection: An Autobiography. M. Evans and Company, 1968.
