= Lionel Atwill =

English and American actor (1885–1946)

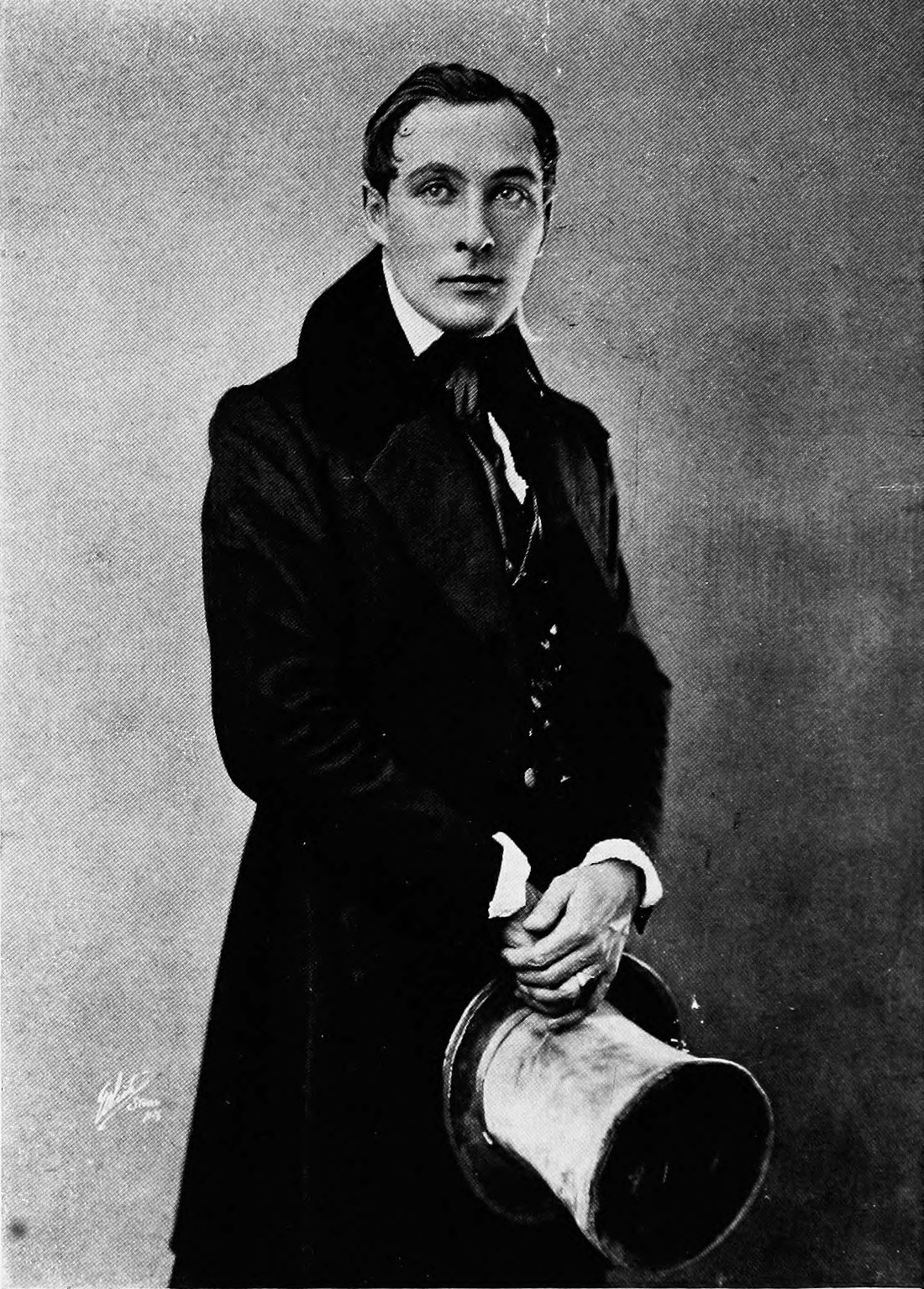
- Atwill in 1921 as Deburau
- Born: Lionel Alfred William Atwill; 1 March 1885; Croydon, London, England
- Died: 22 April 1946 (aged 61); Pacific Palisades, Los Angeles, California, U.S.
- Occupation: Actor
- Years active: 1904–1946
- Spouses: Phyllis Relph (m. 1913; div. 1919) Elsie Mackay (m. 1920; div. 1928) Louise Cromwell Brooks (m. 1930; div. 1943) Mary Paula Pruter (m. 1944)
- Children: 2

Lionel Alfred William Atwill (1 March 1885 – 22 April 1946) was an English and American stage and screen actor. He began his acting career at the Garrick Theatre. After coming to the United States, he appeared in Broadway plays and Hollywood films. Some of his more significant roles were in Captain Blood (1935), Son of Frankenstein (1939) and To Be or Not to Be (1942).

== Life and career ==
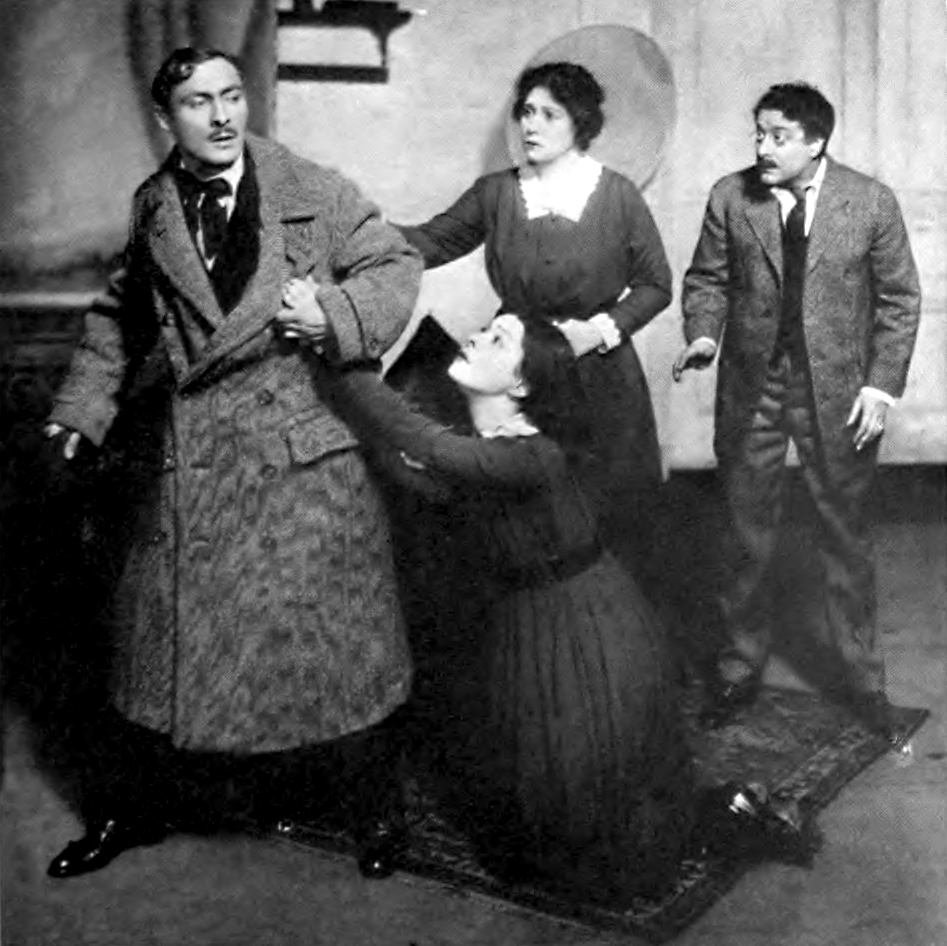
Lionel Atwill, Alla Nazimova, Amy Veness and Harry Mestayer in the 1918 English-language production of Ibsen's The Wild Duck—one of six leading roles Atwill played on Broadway that season

Atwill was born on 1 March 1885 in Croydon, London, England. He studied architecture before his stage debut at the Garrick Theatre, London, in 1904.

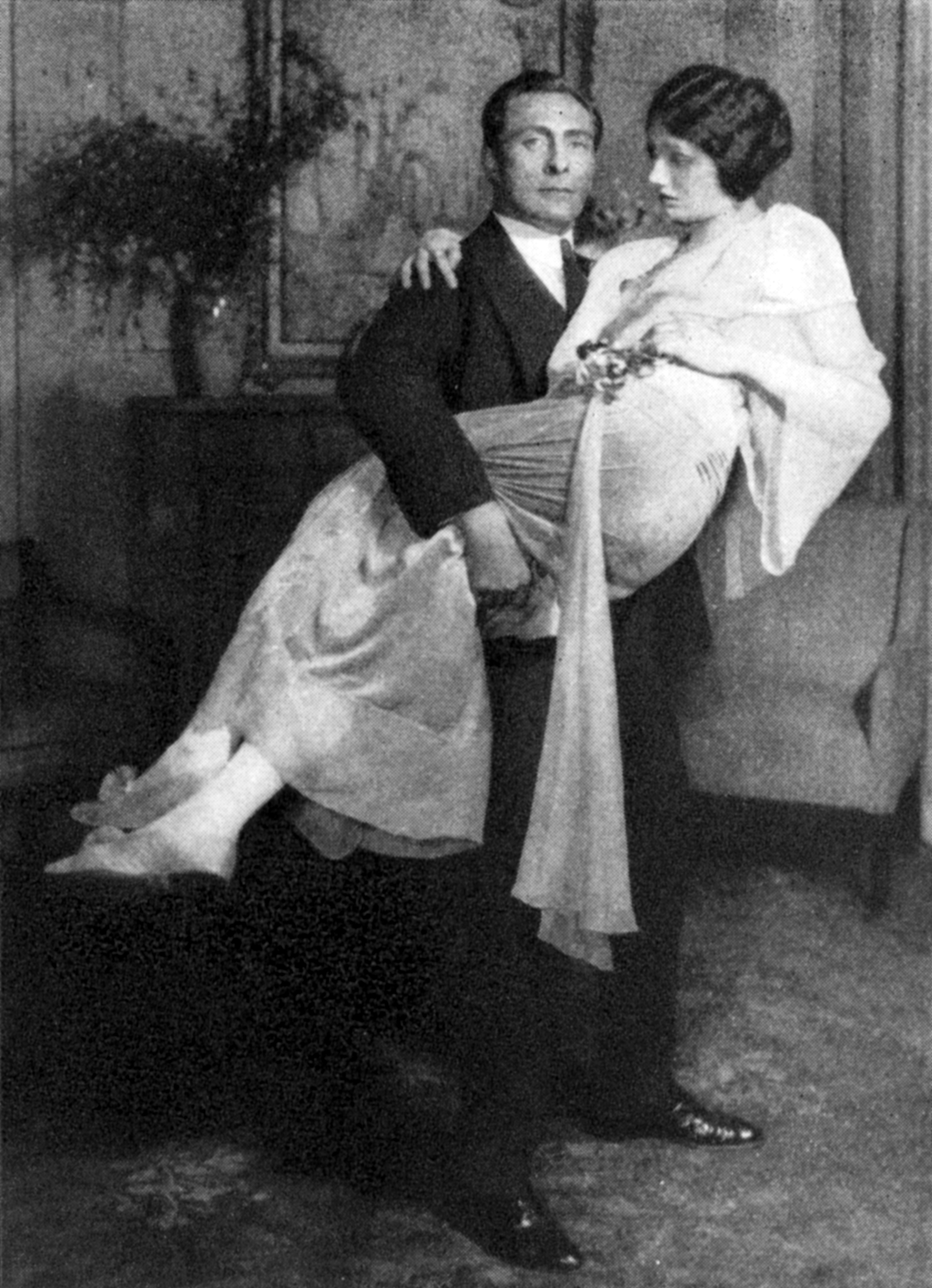
Lionel Atwill and Katharine Cornell in the Broadway production of The Outsider (1924)

He became a star in Broadway theatre by 1918 and made his screen debut in 1919. His Broadway credits include The Lodger (1916), The Silent Witness (1930), Fioretta (1928), The Outsider (1924), Napoleon (1927), The Thief (1926), Slaves All (1926), Beau Gallant (1925), Caesar and Cleopatra (1924), The Outsider (1923), The Comedian (1922), The Grand Duke (1921), Deburau (1920), Tiger! Tiger! (1918), Another Man's Shoes (1918), A Doll's House (1917), Hedda Gabler (1917), The Wild Duck (1917), The Indestructible Wife (1917), L'elevation (1917), and Eve's Daughter (1917).

He acted on the stage in Australia and then became involved in U.S. horror films in the 1930s, including leading roles in Doctor X (1932), The Vampire Bat, Murders in the Zoo and Mystery of the Wax Museum (all 1933), and perhaps most memorably as the one-armed Inspector Krogh in Son of Frankenstein (1939), a role famously parodied by Kenneth Mars in Mel Brooks' 1974 satire Young Frankenstein. He appeared in four subsequent Universal Frankenstein films as well as many other of the studio's beloved chillers.

His other roles include a romantic lead opposite Marlene Dietrich in Josef von Sternberg's The Devil Is a Woman (1935), a crooked insurance investigator in The Wrong Road (1937) for RKO, Dr. James Mortimer in 20th Century Fox's film version of The Hound of the Baskervilles (1939), and Professor Moriarty in the Universal Studios film Sherlock Holmes and the Secret Weapon (1943). He also had a rare comedy role in Ernst Lubitsch's 1942 classic To Be or Not to Be and that same year menaced Abbott and Costello in Pardon My Sarong.

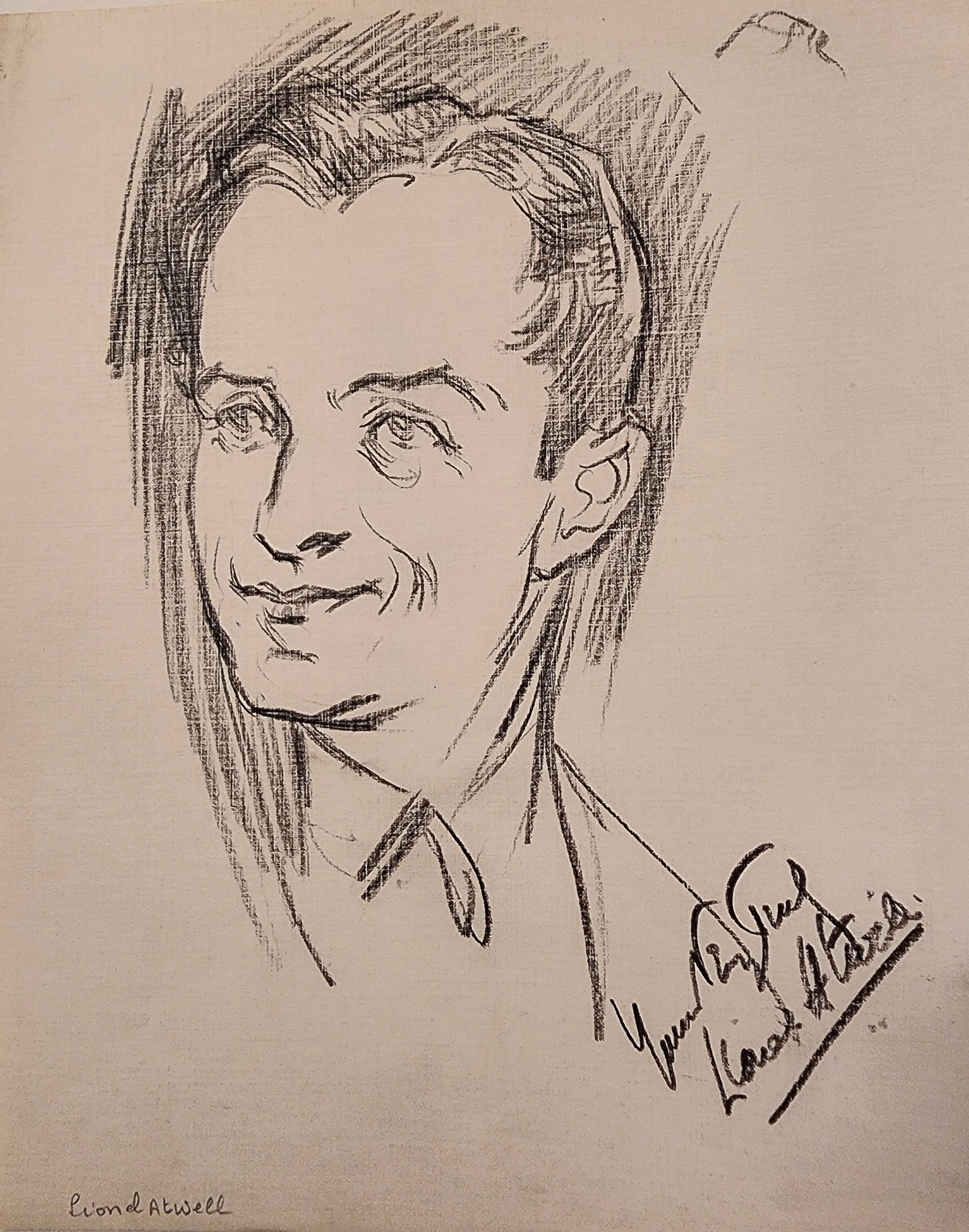
Signed drawing of Lionel Atwill by Manuel Rosenberg 1924

== Scandal ==
Virginia Lopez was a 30-year-old dress designer from Cuba. Sylvia Hamalaine was a 16-year-old Minnesota girl who came to Hollywood to break into film. Lopez, along with her boyfriend Adolphe LaRue, was charged with having molested Hamalaine in the Hollywood apartment where both women resided.

Lopez's defense attorney, Donald MacKay, tried to deflect blame from Lopez by claiming Hamalaine was a sex worker. He accused Hamalaine of being present at several parties at the beach home of Lionel Atwill in December and January 1940 where "indecencies" took place. Both LaRue and Lopez were convicted of contributing to the deliquency of a minor.

A grand jury was summoned to investigate the charges levied at actors and others in the motion picture industry. Atwill testified on May 21, 1941, before the grand jury and vehemently denied all accusations. Nothing "scandalous" had happened, he said. The grand jury declined to indict anyone on June 1, 1941. Grand jury foreman Theodore Peirce said, "The stories were just too fabulous and the credulity of the jury was taxed beyond all endurance by all of the witnesses."

In June 1942, a second grand jury re-examined the 1941 evidence and decided to re-open the investigation. Atwill was indicted on charges of perjury. By showing pornographic films at his parties, "scandalous" activity had, indeed, occurred, the grand jury concluded. Atwill pleaded not guilty to the charge. A second perjury indictment was handed down on August 11, after the grand jury determined Atwill had lied twice under oath. The two indictments were consolidated.

Trial was set for September 28, 1942, but on September 24 Atwill changed his plea to guilty. He denied all charges of immoral acts, but did admit to possessing and showing lewd films to a small group of friends at his beach house. Atwill was sentenced on October 15 to five years of probation. The court noted that the witnesses against Atwill were "unsavory", and that Atwill had received numerous character references from local law enforcement and important Hollywood people.

Under the Hays Code of conduct for the motion picture industry, Atwill was blackballed from working.

On April 16, 1943, Atwill asked a court to terminate his probation and allow him to change his 1942 guilty plea to not guilty.

Seven days later, Superior Court Judge William R. McKay granted Atwill's motion. After Atwill pleaded not guilty, the judge vacated his 1942 conviction. The court said the perjury charges had been brought by someone with a "personal motive" who wanted to "get even" with Atwill.

== Personal life ==
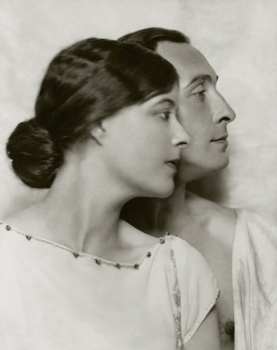
Lionel Atwill and Elsie Mackay (1922)

Atwill married four times. His first wife was Phyllis Relph; the couple married in 1913 and divorced in 1919. In 1941, their son John Arthur Atwill (born 1914) was killed in action at age 26. Atwill married the actress Elsie Mackay in 1920. He married Louise Cromwell Brooks in 1930 after her divorce from General of the Army Douglas MacArthur; they divorced in 1943. Atwill married Paula Pruter in 1944, and their marriage continued until his death. Their son, Lionel Anthony Atwill, is a retired writer.

Atwill died on 22 April 1946, as a result of lung cancer and pneumonia at his home in Pacific Palisades, Los Angeles.

== Filmography ==
- Eve's Daughter (1918) - Courtenay Urquhart
- For Sale (1918) - Minor Role
- The Marriage Price (1919) - Kenneth Gordon
- The Eternal Mother (1920) - Howard Hollister
- The Highest Bidder (1921) - Lester
- The Silent Witness (1932) - Sir Austin Howard
- Doctor X (1932) - Dr. Jerry Xavier
- The Vampire Bat (1933) - Dr. Otto von Niemann
- The Secret of Madame Blanche (1933) - Aubrey St. John
- Mystery of the Wax Museum (1933) - Ivan Igor
- Murders in the Zoo (1933) - Eric Gorman
- The Sphinx (1933) - Jerome Breen
- The Song of Songs (1933) - Baron von Merzbach
- Secret of the Blue Room (1933) - Robert von Helldorf
- The Solitaire Man (1933) - Inspector Wallace
- Nana (1934) - Colonel André Muffat
- Beggars in Ermine (1934) - John 'Flint' Dawson aka John Daniels
- Stamboul Quest (1934) - Herr Von Sturm
- One More River (1934) - Brough
- The Age of Innocence (1934) - Julius Beaufort
- The Firebird (1934) - John Pointer
- The Man Who Reclaimed His Head (1934) - Henry Dumont
- The Devil Is a Woman (1935) - Capt. Don Pasqual 'Pasqualito' Costelar
- Mark of the Vampire (1935) - Inspector Neumann
- The Murder Man (1935) - Captain Cole
- Rendezvous (1935) - Major William Brennan
- Captain Blood (1935) - Colonel Bishop
- Lady of Secrets (1936) - Mr. Whittaker
- Till We Meet Again (1936) - Ludwig
- Absolute Quiet (1936) - G.A. Axton
- The High Command (1937) - Maj. Gen. Sir John Sangye, VC
- The Road Back (1937) - Prosecutor
- The Last Train from Madrid (1937) - Col. Vigo
- Lancer Spy (1937) - Colonel Fenwick
- The Wrong Road (1937) - Mike Roberts
- The Great Garrick (1937) - Beaumarchais
- Three Comrades (1938) - Breuer
- The Great Waltz (1938) - Count Hohenfried
- Son of Frankenstein (1939) - Inspector Krogh
- The Three Musketeers (1939) - De Rochefort
- The Hound of the Baskervilles (1939) - James Mortimer M.D.
- The Gorilla (1939) - Walter Stevens
- The Sun Never Sets (1939) - Zurof
- Mr. Moto Takes a Vacation (1939) - Prof. Roger Chauncey Hildebrand
- The Secret of Dr. Kildare (1939) - Paul Messenger
- Balalaika (1939) - Prof. Marakov
- The Mad Empress (1939) - General Bazaine
- Charlie Chan in Panama (1940) - Cliveden Compton
- Johnny Apollo (1940) - Jim McLaughlin
- Charlie Chan's Murder Cruise (1940) - Dr. Suderman
- Girl in 313 (1940) - Russell aka Henry Woodruff
- The Great Profile (1940) - Dr. Bruce
- Boom Town (1940) - Harry Compton
- Man Made Monster (1941, re-released as The Atomic Monster) - Dr. Paul Rigas
- To Be or Not to Be (1942) - Rawitch
- The Mad Doctor of Market Street (1942) - Graham / Dr. Ralph Benson
- The Ghost of Frankenstein (1942) - Doctor Theodore Bohmer
- The Strange Case of Doctor Rx (1942) - Dr. Fish
- Junior G-Men of the Air (1942, Serial) - The Baron
- Pardon My Sarong (1942) - Varnoff
- Cairo (1942) - Teutonic Gentleman
- Night Monster (1942) - Dr. King
- Sherlock Holmes and the Secret Weapon (1943) - Moriarty
- Frankenstein Meets the Wolf Man (1943) - Mayor
- Captain America (1944, Serial) - Cyrus Maldor
- Lady in the Death House (1944) - Charles Finch
- Raiders of Ghost City (1944, Serial) - Erich von Rugen, alias Alex Morel
- Secrets of Scotland Yard (1944) - Waterlow
- House of Frankenstein (1944) - Inspector Arnz
- Fog Island (1945) - Alec Ritchfield
- Crime, Inc. (1945) - Pat Coyle
- House of Dracula (1945) - Police Inspector Holtz
- Lost City of the Jungle (1946, Serial) - Sir Eric Hazarias (released posthumously)
- Genius at Work (1946) - Latimer Marsh / The Cobra (final film role, released posthumously)
