= Poldekin =

1920 play by Booth Tarkington

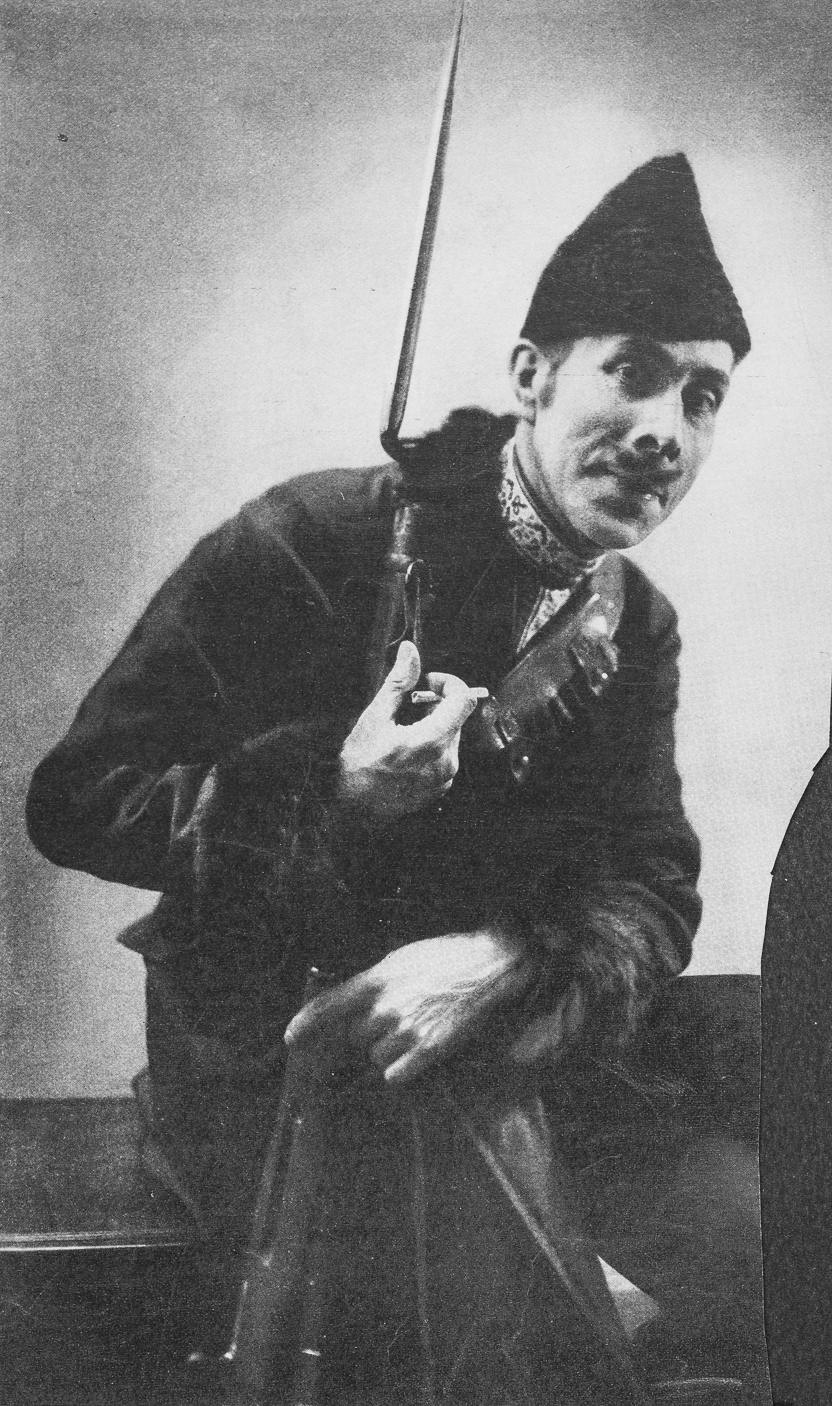
- George Arliss as Poldekin
- Original language: English
- Written by: Booth Tarkington
- Subject: Bolshevism undone by baseball
- Genre: Satire
- Setting: A Russian city apartment and a New York City tenement

Premiere
- Date: September 9, 1920
- Place: Park Theatre
- Directed by: George C. Tyler

Poldekin is a 1920 play by Booth Tarkington. It is a four-act political satire with three settings and ten characters. The story concerns a Russian soldier brought to New York City to produce Bolshevik propaganda, who strays from his mission. Adverse audience reaction to the original ending resulted in Tarkington rewriting parts of the play during its opening tour.

The play was produced and staged by George C. Tyler, and it starred George Arliss. It had an opening tour from February through May 1920, then went on hiatus. It reopened with a different supporting cast for a two-day tryout before it premiered on Broadway in September 1920. Though well received by some academics, it proved unpopular with critics and audiences, and it was withdrawn after 44 performances.

== Characters ==
Characters are listed in order of appearance within their scope.

Lead

- Poldekin is the son of a Rumanian dancer, a former embassy interpreter, and now a Red Guard. (Note: The first syllable of the name is pronounced "Pole" according to one reviewer.)

Supporting

- Podoff is a blind former professor, the chief ideologue of the bolshevik group.
- Maria is Podoff's daughter, who is assigned to assassinate a US government official.
- Pinsky is a former Bowery denizen, returned to Russia, who will serve as the group's guide.
- Nicolai is the devoted leader of the bolsheviks who come to America.

Featured

- Endechieff is the weak link of the group who has a liking for Brunswick cocktails.
- Krimoff is another member of the radical group.
- Blanche is a New York charity girl, Poldekin's neighbor, who answers his questions about America.
- Welch is an undercover detective for a US government agency.
- Sergeant is Welch's liaison with the local police who raid the bolsheviks.

Bit players

- Tenement dwellers, policemen

== Synopsis ==
This synopsis is compiled from contemporaneous newspaper and magazine reviews.

Act I (An apartment in a Russian city.) The setting shows signs of struggle from outside; flames flicker dimly through glassless windows and holes in the walls. From time to time shots are heard: singly, a few together, then in bursts. Podoff has gathered the others to discuss their upcoming mission to America. To hone their language skill, they have agreed to speak only English among themselves. Maria serves them tea; Poldekin has joined the group solely to see no harm comes to her. They discuss the mission, though Poldekin's enthusiasm seems more nuanced than the others ideological fervor. He punctures their assertions about Bolshevism with dry wit. They regard him as an amiable halfwit, and so assign him an easy task: printing propaganda tracts when they reach New York. (Curtain)

Act II (Backyard of a New York City tenement.) The group's members have taken separate rooms in a tenement filled with immigrants from many countries. They meet in the backyard, and continue to speak in English, since Poldekin points out it is the least understood language among the building's inhabitants. Poldekin annoys everyone by asking the same question repeatedly: What is America? He confounds his colleagues proposals by pointing out the inherent difficulties, and thwarts any suggestion that Maria carry out her task to assassinate an official. Having heard about baseball, he asks Pinsky to take him to see it. Pinsky, who pretends to be indifferent, agrees. (Curtain)

Act III (Same as Act II.) Poldekin reports back to the group on baseball, but his appreciation of it draws rebukes from his colleagues. The others try to convince Blanche to join their cause. Being a social outcast, who names the geraniums in her flower-box after lovers, they feel she should be an easy convert. But Blanche isn't eager to give up what little she has to state ownership. She rejects their arguments, and the commotion draws the attention of Welch. He plys Endechieff with a vile concoction he calls a Brunswick cocktail, and the tipsy bolshevik soon turns tipster. Poldekin realizes he has embraced the idea of America in preference to Bolshivik theory; as he does so, the act ends with a Decoration Day parade, only the flags of which are glimpsed over the top of the tenement fence as they go by to stirring music. (Curtain)

Act IV (An apartment in the same tenement.) The police have picked up Endechieff, who fingers the others. They are all brought to Poldekin's apartment. The police intend to charge them with distributing seditious literature. However, they find that instead of Bolshevik propaganda, Poldekin has printed copies of the Declaration of Independence and the US Constitution. Welch and the police are stymied; they release the whole group from arrest and depart. Poldekin argues with the others that America is better run than their own revolution. Maria is convinced, some of the others are swayed. Nicolai is more upset with Poldekin than with Endechieff. He pulls out a pistol and shoots Poldekin. In the original ending of the play, Poldekin dies at this point, with Blanche afterward placing a small American flag on his chest. Tarkington's revised ending has Poldekin only slightly wounded, and he survives to marry Maria. (Curtain)

== Original production ==
=== Background ===
George C. Tyler had been working as a semi-independent producer in association with Klaw and Erlanger since 1915. However, he took on production of Poldekin by himself. He would also stage it, something he had rarely done before. Tyler was a longtime friend of both Booth Tarkington (Note: Tyler's 1934 memoir is dedicated to Tarkington, who also wrote the introduction for it.) and George Arliss. Tyler and Tarkington carried on a large correspondence about the proposed play before its completion. Tarkington lamented that he had to boil down Bolshevism to a simple dictum that revolution must be continuous. He wrote that defining the differences between it and other forms of left-wing ideology would lose the audience. This simplification would later draw the critical wrath of Heywood Broun, a self-avowed socialist.

=== Opening tour ===
The first performance of Poldekin was at the Collingwood Theatre in Poughkeepsie, New York, on February 21, 1920. The local reviewer judged the play and Arliss' performance a success. They cited the humor in "Poldekin's method of showing the absurdity of Bolshevik reasoning by pushing its principles to their logical conclusion". They also defended his ending, "warmly debated among playgoers", by suggesting if Poldekin had survived it would trivialize the threat of bolshevik radicalism. The production next played a few days at Parsons' Theatre in Hartford, Connecticut, where again the local critic reported audience dismay at the ending and suggested that it might be changed.

“Well, it is played on a green field all sparkling in the sunshine. Then thousands and thousands of people all desiring constantly that something impossible should happen, and then suddenly they are bitterly disappointed-- and then instantly again audible with the most radiant optimism-- down below you see groups of athletes-- and the great masses of people rise and shout their wishes to the athletes-- but the athletes always do something much the opposite-- and then the people sit down and breathe so hard-- you can feel it on the back of your neck-- there, with the sun shining on the people, you can see that everybody is an American-- more than anywhere else.” —Poldekin on baseball, from Act III.

It then went to the Court Square Theatre in Springfield, Massachusetts, where a local reviewer praised Jean Robertson's Blanche, and Mannert Kippen for "making the Russian intelligentsia intelligent" and not a "stage Russian". But they also pointed out Poldekin's death "breaks down the main thesis of the play". Another Springfield newspaper critic went even further, opening their review: "Just why Booth Tarkington should becloud his latest play, Poldekin, ...with a tactless and blundering death denouement is a mystery".

By March 15, 1920, the production had reached Ford's Theatre in Baltimore, where after dying four nights in succession, Poldekin was given a reprieve. Tarkington, responding to audience reaction, revised the Act IV ending overnight, which was performed for the first time on March 19, 1920. Thereafter the production played smoothly to decent reviews in Detroit, Philadelphia, and Cleveland before the inevitable summer shutdown, when Arliss would return to England. In Pittsburgh, the reviewer "Gibby" subtitled their report "Baseball vs. Bolshevisim" and reproduced Poldekin's Act III description of a baseball game to his comrades.

=== Cast ===
Cast during the opening tour and the Broadway run. Production was on hiatus from May 23 through September 5, 1920.
Role	Actor	Dates	Notes and sources
Poldekin	George Arliss	Feb 21, 1920 - Oct 16, 1920	
Podoff	Carl Anthony	Feb 21, 1920 - Oct 16, 1920	Anthony was one of two supporting actors to keep their role from the earlier production.
Maria	Jean Robertson	Feb 21, 1920 - May 22, 1920	
Maria	Elsie Mackay	Sep 06, 1920 - Oct 16, 1920	
Pinsky	Guy Cunningham	Feb 21, 1920 - May 22, 1920	
Pinsky	E. G. Robinson	Sep 06, 1920 - Oct 16, 1920	
Nicolai	Mannart Kippen	Feb 21, 1920 - Oct 16, 1920	Kippen was the other supporting actor to reprise his original role from the spring of 1920.
Endechieff	William H. Barwald	Feb 21, 1920 - May 22, 1920	
Endechieff	Emil Hoch	Sep 06, 1920 - Oct 16, 1920	
Krimoff	Stapleton Kent	Feb 21, 1920 - May 22, 1920	
Krimoff	Hubert Wilke	Sep 06, 1920 - Oct 16, 1920	
Blanche	Norma Mitchell	Feb 21, 1920 - May 22, 1920	
Blanche	Julia Dean	Sep 06, 1920 - Oct 16, 1920	
Welch	Edward Donnelly	Feb 21, 1920 - May 22, 1920	
Welch	Sidney Toler	Sep 06, 1920 - Oct 16, 1920	
Sergeant	Jack Ellis	Feb 21, 1920 - Feb 28, 1920	Ellis was replaced after one week for unknown reasons.
Sergeant	Irving Deckford	Mar 01, 1920 - May 22, 1920	
Sergeant	William H. Barwald	Sep 06, 1920 - Oct 16, 1920	Barwald switched from the role of Endechieff in the Spring of 1920.

=== Tryout ===
George Arliss returned from England on August 28, 1920, and began rehearsals of Poldekin. For a shakedown with the new cast, the production played the Majestic Theatre in Wilkes-Barre, Pennsylvania for two nights starting September 6, 1920. The local reviewer said both Tarkington and George C. Tyler were present for the tryout. They were nuanced about the audience and its reaction, saying it was a "fair-sized crowd" and insisting while there wasn't "continuous outbursts of applause, the show kept the crowd smiling".

=== Broadway premiere and reception ===
Poldekin had its Broadway premiere at the Park Theatre on September 9, 1920. The critic for The Brooklyn Daily Eagle had a mixed opinion: in the hands of Arliss, Poldekin was as delightful as any Shakespearean fool, but the play itself was Tarkington at his weakest. It had some wit and a few original characters, but otherwise the story went nowhere and Tarkington's argument on bolshevism shed "no new light on anything". The Brooklyn Daily Times reviewer concurred: the play was weak and provoked little response from the audience, but Arliss as Poldekin was amusing. They also praised Julia Dean, E. G. Robinson, Mannert Kippen, and Sidney Toler, but thought Elsie Mackay "was lost" as Maria.

Charles Darnton reported that the play lacked action but "There is no end of talk, much of it amusing and some with the tediousness of repetition. Though one of our very best story tellers, Tarkington pays little heed to story this time", concentrating instead on an idea. And that idea was erroneously simplified, according to Heywood Broun, whose review approached Poldekin more as a tract than a drama. Broun excoriated Tarkington for not distinguishing between political and economic systems, and faulted his confusion of bolshevisim with various forms of socialism. Broun did admit that there was a nice tree in the scenery for Acts II and III.

=== Broadway closing ===
Due to a shortage of available theaters, George C. Tyler's production of Bab with Helen Hayes had been delayed, so he decided to replace the underperforming Poldekin at the Park Theatre. It closed on Saturday, October 16, 1920, and two days later Bab premiered at the same theater.

== Bibliography ==
- George C. Tyler and J. C. Furnas. Whatever Goes Up. Bobbs Merrill, 1934.
