= The Vampire Bat =

1933 film by Frank R. Strayer

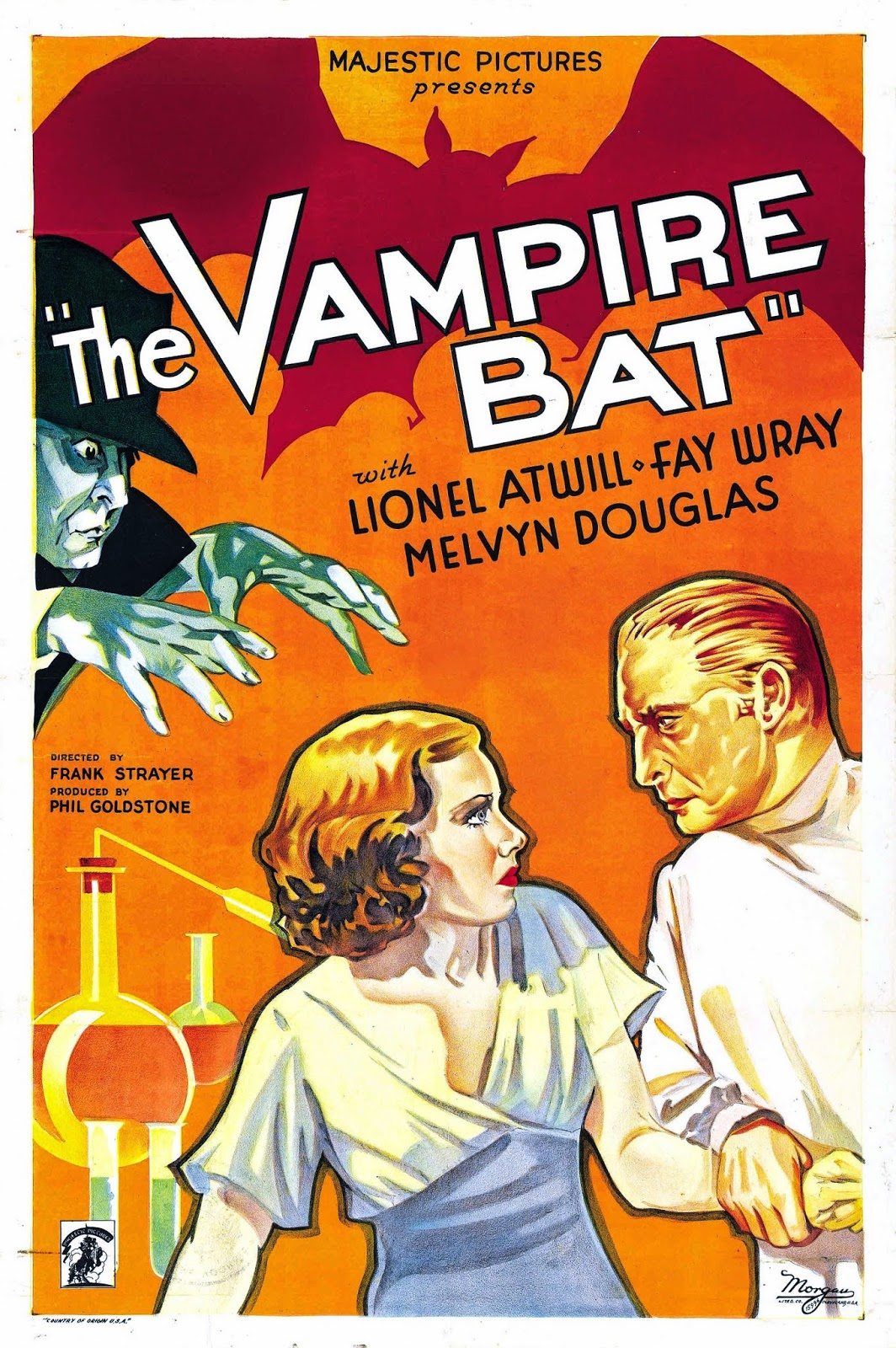
- Theatrical release poster
- Directed by: Frank R. Strayer
- Written by: Edward T. Lowe Jr.
- Produced by: Phil Goldstone; Larry Darmour
- Starring: Lionel Atwill; Fay Wray; Melvyn Douglas; Dwight Frye; Maude Eburne
- Cinematography: Ira H. Morgan
- Edited by: Otis Garrett
- Music by: Charles Dunworth
- Distributed by: Majestic Pictures
- Release date: January 10, 1933
- Running time: 63 minutes
- Country: United States
- Language: English

The full film

The Vampire Bat is a 1933 American Pre-Code horror film directed by Frank R. Strayer and starring Lionel Atwill, Fay Wray, Melvyn Douglas, and Dwight Frye.

== Plot ==
When the villagers of Kleinschloss start dying of blood loss, the town fathers suspect a resurgence of vampirism, but police inspector Karl Brettschneider remains skeptical. Scientist Dr. Otto von Niemann visits a patient who was attacked by a bat, Martha Mueller. Out of appreciation for her kindness, Martha is visited by an eccentric man named Hermann Gleib, who has a fondness for bats.

On the doctor's journey home, he meets Kringen, one of the townsfolk, who claims to have been attacked by the vampire in the form of a bat. Von Niemann encourages Kringen to tell the townsfolk of his story. Kringen becomes suspicious that Hermann, who keeps bats as pets, may be the vampire.

Dr. von Niemann returns to his home, which also houses Brettschneider's love Ruth Bertin, Ruth's hypochondriac aunt Gussie Schnappmann, and servants Emil Borst and Georgiana. Fear of the vampire and suspicion of Hermann quickly spread around the town and people start fearing him. Ms. Mueller dies that night and when her body is examined, the cause of death is determined to be blood loss from two puncture wounds in the neck. Hermann enters the examination, and upon seeing the dead body, runs away screaming.

Next morning, the town fathers announce that Kringen is dead and Hermann is missing. An angry mob hunts down Hermann and chases him through the countryside and into a cave, where he jumps to his death.

That night, Dr. von Niemann telepathically compels Emil Borst to pick up sleeping Georgiana and bring her to the doctor's laboratory, where a strange organism is seen. They then drain her blood from her neck.

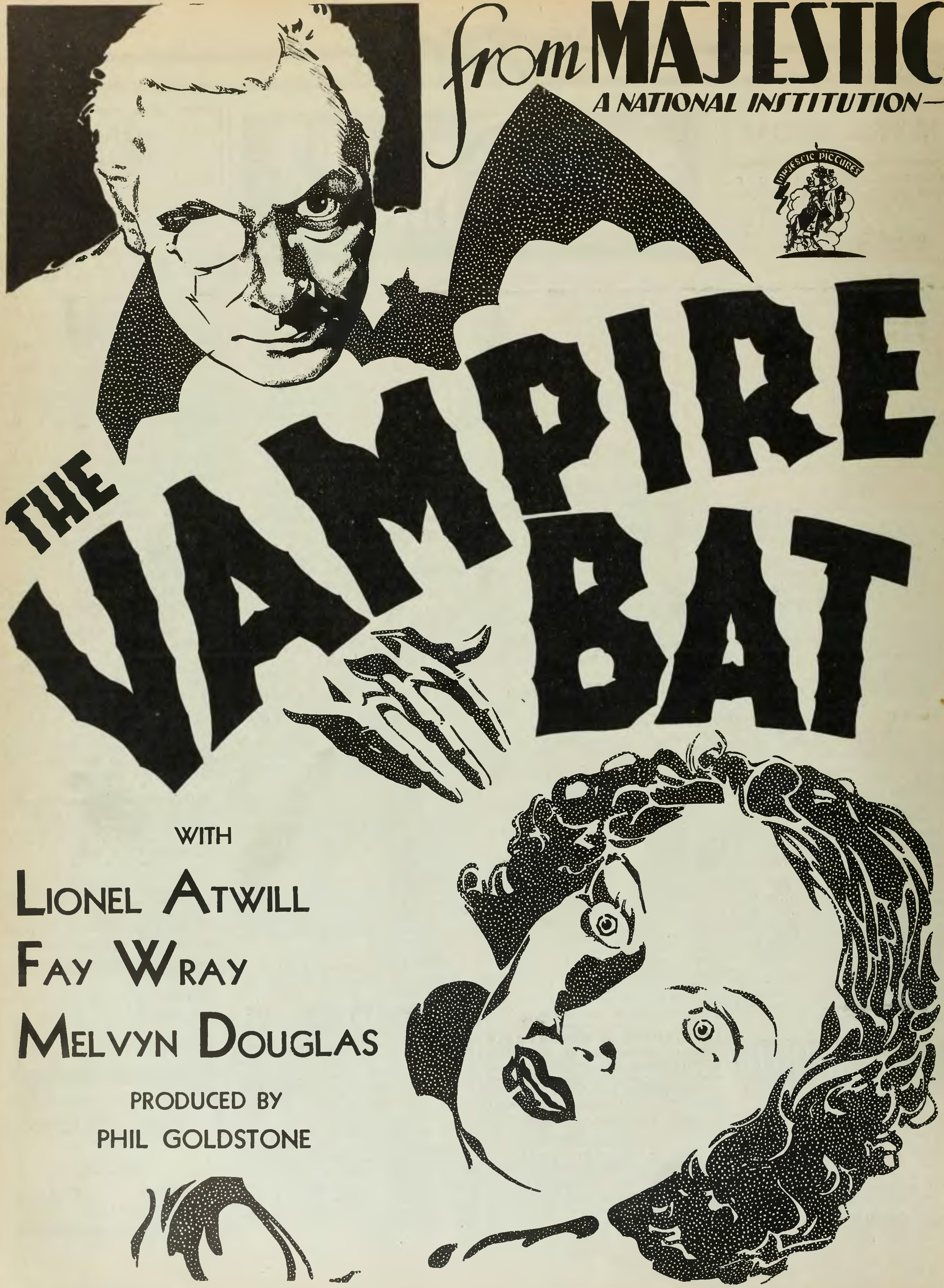
Movie ad from The Film Daily in 1932

When Gussie discovers Georgiana's body in her bed, Brettschneider becomes more convinced of the presence of vampires in the village and suspects Hermann.

Upon hearing of Hermann's death, however, Brettschneider's conviction is erased. Dr. von Niemann tells Brettschneider to go home and take sleeping pills, but gives him poison instead, intent on draining his blood. Ruth discovers Dr. von Niemann telepathically controlling Borst, who is at Brettschneider's house. It is revealed that Dr. von Niemann has created an artificial lifeform and is using the blood to feed his organism. He ties Ruth up and gags her in his lab. Borst enters with Brettschneider's body on a trolley. Dr. von Niemann walks over to Borst, who is revealed to be Brettschneider (who did not take the pills) in costume, with the real Borst on the trolley. In the ensuing struggle, Borst holds von Niemann at gunpoint and tells Brettschneider to leave with Ruth. As the couple exit the room they hear two shots. Brettchneider goes back into the room to find them both dead.

== Cast ==
- Lionel Atwill as Dr. Otto von Niemann
- Fay Wray as Ruth Bertin
- Melvyn Douglas as Karl Brettschneider
- Maude Eburne as Gussie Schnappmann
- George E. Stone as Kringen
- Dwight Frye as Hermann Gleib
- Robert Frazer as Emil Borst
- Rita Carlisle as Martha Mueller
- Lionel Belmore as Bürgermeister Gustave Schoen
- William V. Mong as Sauer
- Stella Adams as Georgiana
- Paul Weigel as Dr. Holdstadt
- Harrison Greene as Weingarten
- William Humphrey as Dr. Haupt
- Carl Stockdale as Schmidt
- Paul Panzer as Townsman

== Production ==
The theme music of the film, played by Charles Dunworth

Fay Wray and Lionel Atwill had been in the successful film Doctor X the previous year, and had already wrapped up work on Mystery of the Wax Museum for Warner Bros. This was quite a large-scale release and would have a lengthy post-production process. Seeing a chance to exploit all the advance press, poverty row studio Majestic Pictures Inc. contracted Wray and Atwill for their own "quickie" horror film, rushing The Vampire Bat into production and releasing it in January 1933.

Majestic Pictures had lower overheads than the larger studios, which were struggling at the time during the Great Depression. Part of the reason that The Vampire Bat looked almost as good as any Universal Pictures horror film is because Majestic leased James Whale's castoffs, the “German Village” backlot sets left over from Frankenstein (1931) and the interior sets from his film The Old Dark House (1932), plus some location shooting at Bronson Caves. Completing the illusion that this was a film from a much bigger studio, Majestic hired actor Dwight Frye to populate scenes with Wray and Atwill. A stock musical theme by Charles Dunworth, "Stealthy Footsteps", was used to accompany the opening credits.

The Vampire Bat ruse worked well for Majestic, which was able to rush the quickie film into theaters less than a month before Warner's release of Mystery of the Wax Museum. According to The Film Daily (January 10, 1933), the film's running time was 63 minutes, like most extant prints.

== See also ==
- List of films in the public domain in the United States
- Vampire film
