= William C. Hodge =

American politician

William Calvin Hodge was a stone mason, alderman, and state legislator in Tennessee. He represented Hamilton County, Tennessee in the 44th Tennessee General Assembly from 1885 to 1886.

Hodge was born in North Carolina. He was a stone mason and did other jobs around Chattanooga before becoming a contractor, house mover, alderman for the 4th Ward of the City of Chattanooga (1878-1887), city jailer, and state representative. He had a wife named Lou and either three sons or one depending on the source.

He negotiated with Democrats who needed Republican participation to achieve a quorum and secured four additional African American policeman, a jailer position, and sexton. He and Styles L. Hutchins were black representatives from Chattanooga and were among the city's African American city council members in the late 19th century.

== See also ==
- African American officeholders from the end of the Civil War until before 1900
