= Bernard A. Reinold =

American stage actor

Bernard Adolph Reinold (1860 – March 19, 1940) was an American stage actor. He also used the stage name of Adolph Bernard.

Reinold was born in New York City. He ran away to sea at age 15 to avoid having to follow his father (Bernard Henry Reinold, head of the College of Physicians and Surgeons of Columbia University) into the medical profession, spending four years on a whaling boat. He then became an actor, including supporting Lawrence Barrett, and stints with Rose Coghlan's company and Charles Frohman's company. He was also on the executive staff of producer William A. Brady. One of his last roles was in Quarantine (1924) with Helen Hayes. He became superintendent of the Percy Williams Home for Retired Actors in 1926, where he died on March 19, 1940.

He also fought in the Spanish–American War and World War I, and was buried in Arlington National Cemetery.
