= Masquerader =

Masquerader, Masqueraders, The Masquerader or The Masqueraders may refer to:

- The Masquerader (novel), a 1904 novel by Katherine Cecil Thurston
- The Masqueraders, a 1928 novel by Georgette Heyer
- The Masqueraders, an 1894 English play by Henry Arthur Jones
- The Masquerader (play), a 1917 play by John Hunter Booth, based on Thurston's novel
- The Masquerader (1914 film), an American silent film by Charlie Chaplin
- The Masqueraders (film), a 1915 American adaptation of Jones' play
- The Masquerader (1922 film), an American adaptation of Booth's play
- The Masquerader (1933 film), an American adaptation of Booth's play starring Ronald Colman
- Masqueraders, the performers in West Country Carnivals

== See also ==
- Labrisomus conditus, the Masquerader hairy blenny, a fish
- Masquerade (disambiguation)
