= Bird of paradise =

Bird of paradise or Birds of paradise may refer to:

- Bird-of-paradise, a family of birds of the family Paradisaeidae

== Plants ==
- Strelitzia, bird of paradise flower or plant, a genus of perennial plants
- Erythrostemon gilliesii, or bird of paradise, a shrub
- Caesalpinia pulcherrima, or Mexican bird of paradise, a shrub

== Arts and entertainment ==
=== Literature ===
- The Bird of Paradise (play), a 1912 play by Richard Walton Tully
- The Birds of Paradise, a 1962 novel by Paul Scott

=== Film and television ===
- Bird of Paradise (1932 film), based on Tully's play
- Bird of Paradise (1951 film), a colour film, based on Tully's play
- Birds of Paradise (2008 film), a Ukrainian film
- Birds of Paradise (2010 film), an Argentine-American animated film
- Birds of Paradise (2021 film), an American film
- "Bird of Paradise", an episode of Godzilla, 1998
- "Birds of Paradise", an episode of Natural World, 2010
- "Birds of Paradise", an episode of Twice in a Lifetime, 2000
- "Bird of Paradise", an episode of Xiaolin Showdown, 2005

=== Music ===
- Birds of Paradise (musical), a 1987 Off-Broadway musical
- "Bird of Paradise" (Snowy White song), 1983
- "Bird of Paradise", a song by the Appleseed Cast from the 2001 album Low Level Owl, Vol. 1
- "Bird of Paradise", a song by Charlie Parker
- "Birds of Paradise", a song by Peter, Sue and Marc
- "Birds of Paradise", a song by Chrissie Hynde on Pretenders II, 1981

== Other uses ==
- Bird of Paradise (aircraft), a 1927 American military airplane
- Bird of Paradise Island, or Little Tobago, part of Trinidad and Tobago, named for the imported Paradisaea apoda

== See also ==
- Apus, a small constellation in the southern sky representing a bird of paradise
- The Byrds of Paradise, a television series
- Heliconia, or false bird-of-paradise, a genus of flowering plants
- Huma bird, a mythological creature commonly depicted in Persian, Ottoman Turkish, and Urdu poetry
- "May the Bird of Paradise Fly up Your Nose", a 1965 song by Jimmy Dickens
- Paradise Bird, a 1979 album by Amii Stewart
