= Guy Bates Post =

American actor

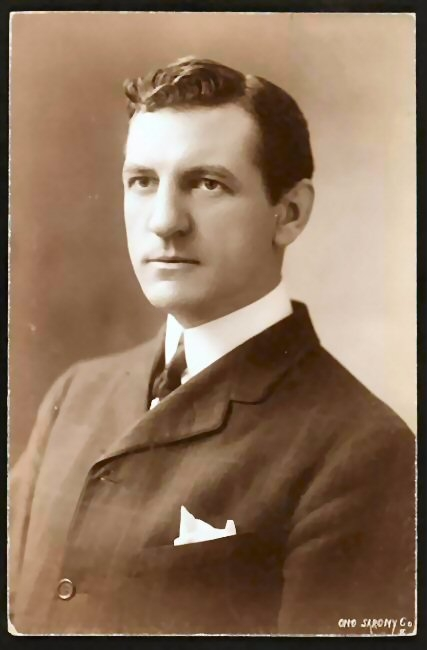
- Born: September 22, 1875; Seattle, Washington, U.S.
- Died: January 16, 1968 (aged 92); Los Angeles, California, U.S.
- Occupations: Theater and film actor
- Years active: 1922-1947
- Spouse(s): Sarah Truax (1897); Jane Peyton (1907-1914); Adele Ritchie (1916-1929); Lillian Kemble-Cooper (1936-1968)

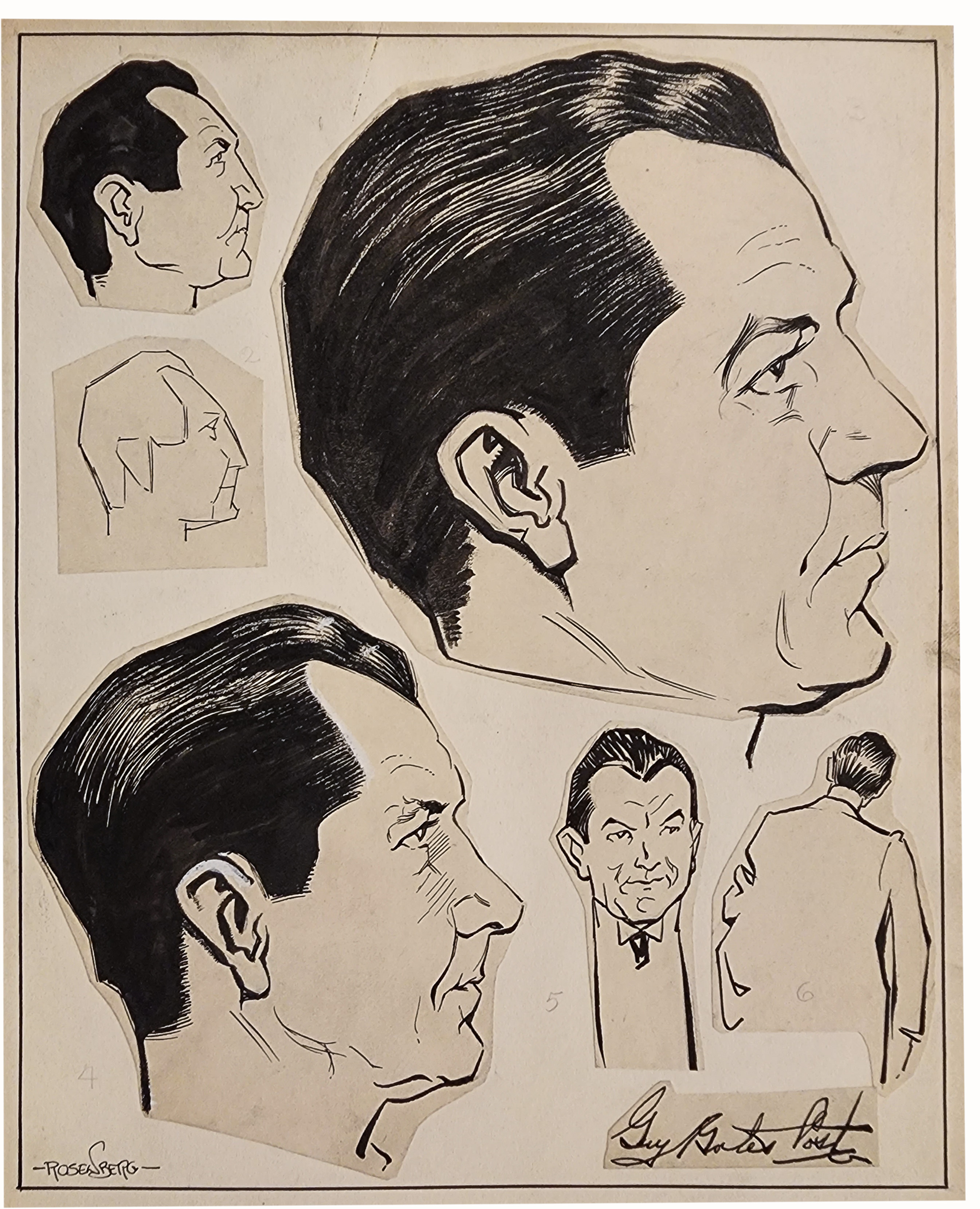
Signed drawing of Guy Bates Post by Manuel Rosenberg for the Cincinnati Post 1921

Guy Bates Post (September 22, 1875 – January 16, 1968) was an American character actor who appeared in at least 21 Broadway plays and 25 Hollywood films over a career that spanned more than 50 years. He was perhaps best remembered in the role of Omar Khayyám in the 1914 stage and 1922 film productions of Richard Walton Tully's Omar the Tentmaker and for his over 1,500 performances in John Hunter Booth's 1917 play The Masquerader.

== Early life ==
Guy Bates Post was born in Seattle, Washington, the first of two sons and a daughter (actress Madeline Post) raised by John J. Post and Mary Annette Ostrander. His father, a Canadian of English descent, was a partner in the Seattle lumber firm Stetson and Post. His mother was born in Wisconsin into a family that originally went west from New York. Post received his education at schools in Seattle and later San Francisco, then he dropped out of college to embark on a career in theatre.

== Stage ==
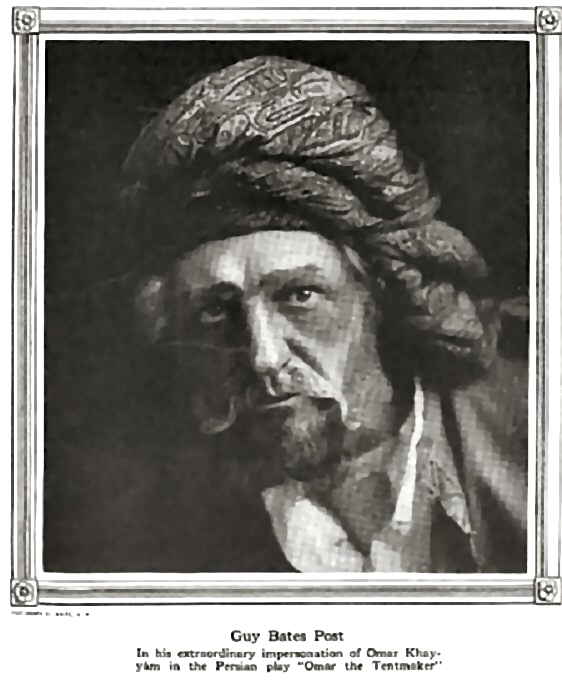
as Omar Khayyám, c. 1914

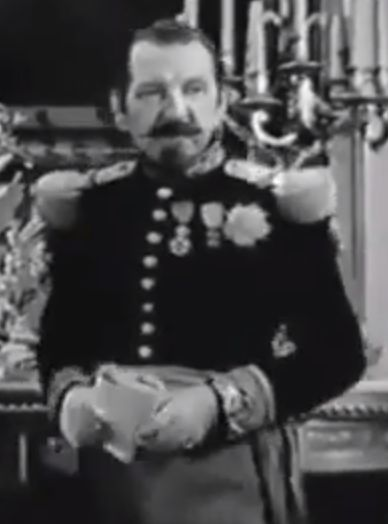
as Napoleon III, c. 1939

Post made his professional debut in November 1894 at Chicago's Schiller Theatre playing a minor role opposite Cora Urquhart Brown-Potter and Kyrle Bellew in Charlotte Corday. By May 1898, Post was a member of Otis Skinner's Company and married to Sarah Truax, the troupe's leading lady. His big break came early in 1900 when he was chosen to play David Brandon in Liebler and Company's Southern American tour of Israel Zangwill's The Children of the Ghetto.

Although the tour proved short lived, Post's performance in The Children of the Ghetto led to such rôles as Rawdon Crowley, in Langdon Miller's dramatization of the William Makepeace Thackeray novel Vanity Fair; Lieutenant Denton, in Augustus Thomas' Arizona; Robert Racket in the Madeleine Lucette Ryley play My Lady Dainty; and Abbe Tiberge, in Theodore Burt Sayre's dramatization of the Abbé Prévost short novel Manon Lescaut.

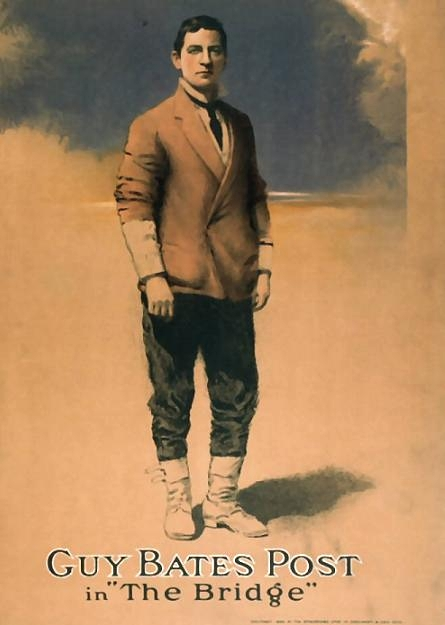
as John Stoddard in The Bridge by Rupert Hughes c. 1909

Post remained active on Broadway until the mid-1930s achieving particular success as Captain Stuart in Soldiers of Fortune (1902) by Augustus Thomas, Steve in The Virginian (1904) by Owen Wister and Kirke La Shelle, Dean in Bird of Paradise (1910) by Richard Walton Tully, Omar Khayyám in Omar the Tent Maker (1914) by Richard Walton Tully and dual rôles, as John Chilcote and John Loder, in The Masquerader (1914) by John Hunter Booth.

Ralph Thomas Kettering and Henry A. Rosendale wrote the play A Lady in Pawn for Post. It premiered at the Powers Theatre in Grand Rapids, Michigan in March 1931.

== Film ==
Post had a 25-year career in cinema beginning in 1922 with silent film adaptations of Omar the Tentmaker and The Masquerader. He played the Grand Lama in the 1936 serial Ace Drummond and 'Papa' Bergelot in the 1937 serial The Mysterious Pilot. Post played Louis Napoleon in the 1937 film Maytime with John Barrymore, Jeanette MacDonald and Nelson Eddy. In 1939, he was once again cast as Louis Napoleon in the film The Mad Empress opposite Medea de Novara, Lionel Atwill and Conrad Nagel. In his last film, A Double Life (1947), Post plays an actor performing in a production of Shakespeare's Othello.

== Personal life ==
Post married actress Sarah Truax on April 18, 1897, at St. John's Episcopal Church, San Francisco. At the time, the two were engaged with Skinner's company performing at the city's Baldwin Theatre. The couple divorced amicably some ten years later. In August 1907, he married Jane Peyton (born Jennie Van Norman), a fellow cast member with The Heir to the Hoorah tour. This union ended with an annulment seven years later. Post married Adele Ritchie on February 2, 1916, at a ceremony held in Toronto two days after the actress had secured a divorce from her previous husband. Post and Ritchie separated in 1926 and divorced three years later. On October 26, 1936, in Las Vegas, Post married the British actress Lillian Kemble-Cooper. This union lasted for over 30 years and ended with his death in Los Angeles at the age of 92.

== Filmography ==
Year	Title	Role	Notes
1922	The Masquerader	John Chilcote M.P. / John Loder	Lost film
1922	Omar the Tentmaker	Omar the tentmaker	Lost film
1923	Gold Madness	Jim Kendall	
1931	Prestige	Major	
1936	Till We Meet Again	Captain Bruce Minton	
1936	The Case Against Mrs. Ames	Judge John Davis	
1936	Fatal Lady	Feodor Glinka	
1936	Trouble for Two	Ambassador of Irania	uncredited
1936	Ace Drummond	The Grand Lama	
1936	Camille	Auctioneer	uncredited
1937	Champagne Waltz	Lumvedder	
1937	Maytime	Louis Napoleon	
1937	Blazing Barriers	Reginald Burley	
1937	The Mysterious Pilot	'Papa' Bergelot	serial, [Chs.1-4,6-8,15]
1937	Daughter of Shanghai	Lloyd Burkett	
1938	Of Human Hearts	Horse Buyer	uncredited
1938	Marie Antoinette	Convention President	uncredited
1939	Juarez		uncredited
1939	The Mad Empress	Louis Napoleon III	
1942	Crossroads	President of the Court	uncredited
1945	The Picture of Dorian Gray	Victor - Butler	uncredited
1945	The Hidden Eye	George (butler)	scenes deleted
1946	Easy to Wed	Roberts, Allebury's Butler	uncredited
1947	A Double Life	Actor in 'Othello'	
