= Jane Peyton =

American actress (1870–1946)

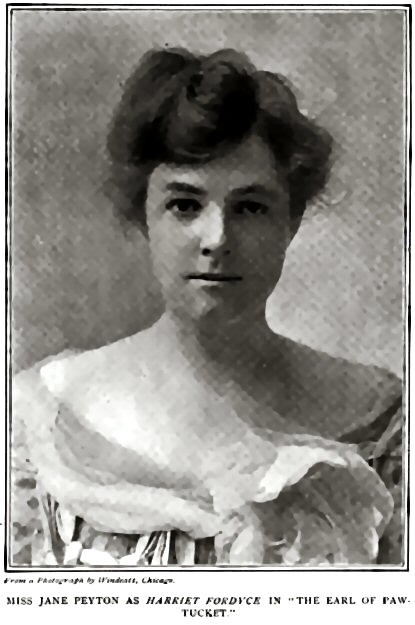
- Jane Peyton c.1904
- Born: October 26, 1870; Spring Green, Wisconsin
- Died: September 8, 1946 (aged 75); Auburn, New York
- Other name: Jennie Van Norman
- Occupation: Actress

Jane Peyton (October 26, 1870 – September 8, 1946) was an American lead and supporting actress whose career did not commence until she was nearly 30. During her time on stage, she appeared in several long-running Broadway plays and successful road tours. Peyton is remembered for her performances in The Ninety and Nine, The Earl of Pawtucket, The Heir to the Hoorah, The Three of Us, and The Woman. Once the wife of actor Guy Bates Post, Peyton retired after 14 years on stage, when she married the writer Samuel Hopkins Adams.

== Early life ==
Jennie Van Norman was born in Spring Green, Wisconsin, the daughter of George Bosworth Van Norman and Elizabeth Atkinson. Her father served as a sergeant and later drill master with Company H, Wisconsin 8th Infantry Regiment during the American Civil War. After the war, he purchased a small meat packing company in Spring Green that eventually expanded to include branches in Milwaukee and Chicago and employ over 200 workers. Peyton's mother, a native of Maine, died on October 24, 1875, in Milwaukee at the age of 37. Peyton's father next married Cornelia Elizabeth Parsons on November 4, 1876. She died on April 8, 1878, leaving Van Norman to marry Minnie A. Booth, in Milwaukee on November 4, 1878.

In her youth, Peyton gave recitals and sang at social and church gatherings and at G.A.R. functions hosted by her father. She married a local physician after attending Northwestern University and for some years hence, her activities routinely merited a mention in newspaper society pages. With the encouragement of Otis Skinner, in the summer of 1900, she left her family and comfortable life behind and departed for New York for a career in theatre.

== Career ==
Peyton's debut was a minor rôle in Prince Otto, a romantic melodrama Skinner adapted from the book by Robert Louis Stevenson. Prince Otto opened at Wallack's Theatre on September 3, 1900, and closed after five weeks with a run of 40 performances. She played Lady Fitz-Herbert in Tom Moore, a fictionalized romantic drama about a young Thomas More (Andrew Mack) by Theodore Burt Sayre. The play opened on August 31, 1901, at the Herald Square Theatre, and closed on October 5 after 40 performances. Peyton was the adventuress Kate Van Dyke in Ramsay Morris' The Ninety and Nine, a melodrama loosely based on the hymn by Ira D. Sankey. The Ninety and Nine was presented at the Academy of Music on October 7, 1902, and closed after a run of 128 performances on January 24, 1903. On August 27, 1903, at the Republic Theatre in Rochester, New York she opened with William Collier, Sr. in Eugéne Presbrey's society comedy Personal. The play began a 38-run engagement at New York's Bijou Theatre the following week.

Later that year and into the next, she became the third, and some considered the best, leading actress to support Lawrence D'Orsay in Augustus Thomas' comedy, The Earl of Pawtucket. The critic Zona Gale wrote:

So with "The Earl of Pawtucket"—a revival of last season—to be mentioned because for Mr. Lawrence D'Orsay's amusing performance has at last been found a leading woman—Miss Jane Peyton, whose beauty and distinction and ability promise large things. (The Critic, 1904)

In the early summer of 1905, Peyton assumed the rôle of Mrs. Kate Brandon in Paul Armstrong's comedy, The Heir to the Hoorah, at the Hudson Theatre. She remained with The Heir to the Hoorah when it reappeared that fall at Boston's Hollis Street Theatre and for the ensuing national tour.

In The Three of Us, she played Mrs. Tweed Dix to Carlotta Nillson's Rhy Macchesney. Written by Rachel Crothers, The Three of Us opened at the Madison Square Theatre on October 17, 1906, and continued on into May of the following year with total of 227 performances. In The Great John Ganton, J. Hartley Manners' adaptation of the novel by Arthur Jerome Eddy, Peyton played Mrs. Jack Wilton to George Fawcett's John Ganton. The play opened on May 3, 1909, at the old Lyric Theatre and closed the following month after a run of 40 performances.

With William C. De Mille's drama The Woman, she played Grace, the wife of Judge Jim Blake (John W. Cope). The Woman, ended its season-long run of 247 performances at the Theatre Republic on April 19, 1912.

== Personal life ==
Peyton married Milwaukee physician Dr. Robert Curtis Brown at her father's residence on October 26, 1892, and settled down to life that revolved around social activities of the city's elite. This changed in July 1900, when Peyton traveled to New York to begin rehearsals for Skinner's Prince Otto. Upon hearing of his daughter's departure, George Van Norman threatened to disinherit her, and ultimately, in July 1902, Peyton's husband was granted an uncontested divorce on the grounds of desertion.

Peyton next married Arthur Cecil Gordon Weld, at the time the musical director at the Casino Theatre and one-time musical director of the Florodora Company. The two most likely first met when Weld worked in Milwaukee in the 1890s. For legal reasons, twice-divorced Weld could not remarry in New York, so instead the ceremony took place at the Hotel Walton in Philadelphia on May 22, 1903. This marriage ended in divorce on October 23, 1907.

She married Guy Bates Post, star of The Heir to the Hoorah and former husband of Sarah Truax, on August 21, 1907. On February 16, 1915, Peyton and Post were granted an annulment on the grounds that at time of their wedding she was still married to Weld, claiming they were unaware that her final divorce decree would not take effect until October.

On March 11, 1915, at the residence of Peyton's friend Josephine Wright Chapman, she wed the writer Samuel Hopkins Adams. This union lasted over 30 years, and ended with her death, aged 75, in Auburn, New York.
