= The Heir to the Hoorah (play) =

1904 play by Paul Armstrong

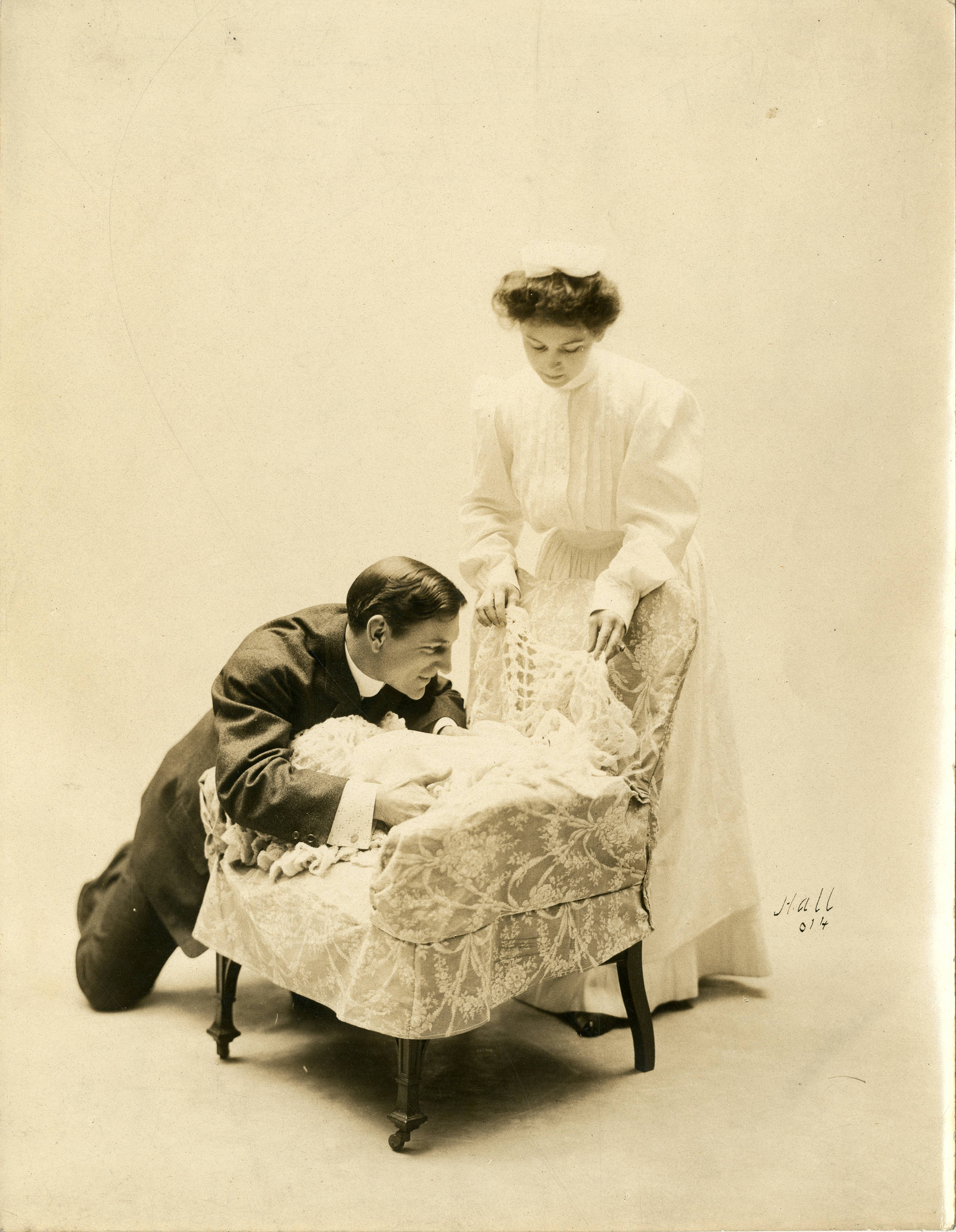
- Original language: English
- Written by: Paul Armstrong
- Based on: "The Transmogrification of Dan" by Henry J. W. Dam (1898)
- Subject: Comic sentiment
- Genre: Melodrama
- Setting: A mining town east of the Divide

Premiere
- Date: April 10, 1905
- Place: Hudson Theatre
- Directed by: Kirke La Shelle

The Heir to the Hoorah is a 1904 play written by Paul Armstrong, which was later determined in court to have been based on "The Transmogrification of Dan" by Henry J. W. Dam. It is a melodrama with four acts, three settings, and moderate pacing. The story concerns the western owner of a gold mine called the Hoorah, his eastern-born wife, and their path to reconciliation.

The play was produced and staged by Kirke La Shelle, the last he would ever do. There were tryouts in Scranton and Philadelphia during March 1905, with the Broadway premiere following in April 1905. The production ran on Broadway through the middle of July 1905, for 112 performances. This was Armstrong's first successful multi-act stage work, though it would become the subject of a copyright violation lawsuit. It also marked the debut of T. Tamamoto, a Japan-born actor who employed jiu-jitsu during the play's action and would go on to appear in a dozen more Broadway productions.

The play was later adapted for a silent film of the same title in 1916.

== Characters ==
The characters are as given in newspaper cast lists and reviews from 1905.

Lead

- Joe Lacy is a newly married young man from the Western US, one-third owner of the Hoorah gold mine.

Supporting

- Mrs. H. J. L. Kent is a Newport society woman of mercenary and shrewish manner.
- Mrs. Joe Lacy is Joe's new wife and daughter of Mrs. Kent, raised with fixed upper-class conventions.
- Dave Lacy is Joe's noisy brother and partner, one-third owner of the Hoorah.
- Bud Young is Joe's friend and partner, one-third owner of the Hoorah.
- Mrs. Kate Brandon is owner of the Katydid mine, a cheery peacemaker.
- H. Van Rennsler Kelly is foreman of the Hoorah mine, a transplanted tenderfoot, fond of Kate.

Featured

- Livingstone Winthrop is an eastern capitalist.
- Bill Ferguson is one-half owner of the Killbear mine.
- Lon Perry is Bill's partner and one-half owner of the Killbear.
- Gus Ferris is owner of the Dixie Ranch.
- Madge Casey is the nineteen-year-old "maiden aunt" of Joe and Dave Lacy.
- Hush is a Japanese valet.
- Morris is a snobby imported British butler.
- Janet is an imported British maid.
- Dr. Whipple is physician for Mrs. Lacy and her young baby.
- Miss Johnson is a trained nurse assisting Mrs. Lacy.

== Synopsis ==
The play was never published. This synopsis is compiled from 1905 newspaper reviews.

Act I (Joe Lacy's House) Joe Lacy has fallen for Miss Kent. After coming to terms with her mother for a $100k "allowance", they are married. Joe builds her a home in the western mining town that is his source of wealth. But after "putting her daughter up for sale", Mrs. Kent moves in and takes over the new house. She criticizes his rough western ways and insults his uncouth friends. She imports a bullying butler Morris and a maid Janet into the servantless house. Joe's wife is completely under her mother's domination and subject to bad advice from Livingstone Winthrop. When she tells Joe she doesn't love him, he goes off to Europe to acquire some polish. (Curtain)

Act II (Hotel dining room and private parlor, eight months later.) Hearing Joe is coming back, his friends put on eastern duds to welcome him back. Some of the rough edges have been knocked off by his new valet Hush, but Joe is still the same guy they remember. Joe finds his household now includes a new-born babe, but is incensed to learn that a fellow in a silk hat was seen calling on his home. Joe knows there are only two men in the mining town who wear silk hats, and determines to find the truth. (Curtain)

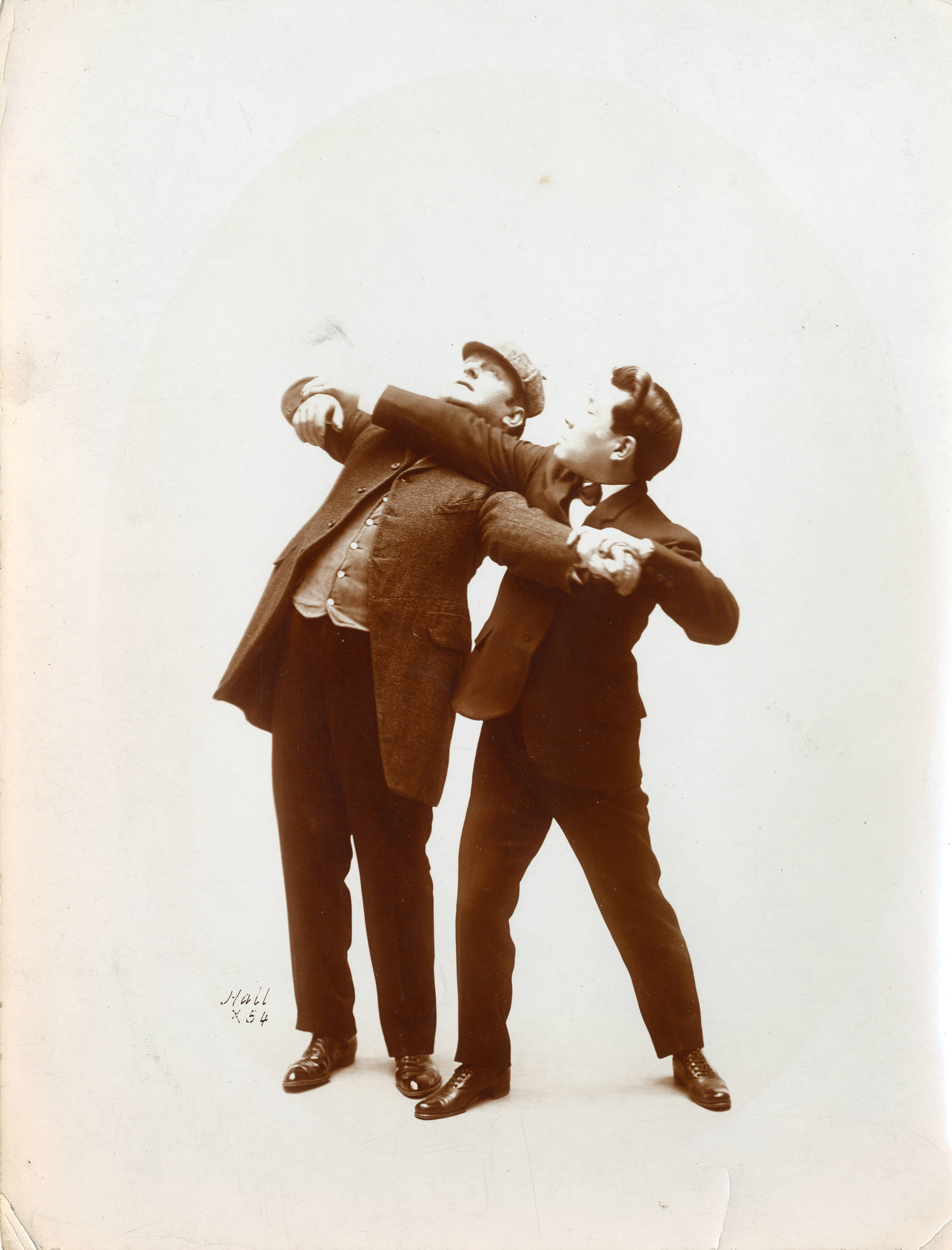

Act III (Same as Act I) Joe questions the two suspected men and determines the one who called was innocent. Presented at last with his heir, Joe swears to regain his home and wife from Mrs. Kent. Bud Young falls for Madge Casey while both are watching the baby for Mrs. Lacy. When Joe challenges Mrs. Kent, Morris tries to intervene, only to be solidly put in his place through the jiu-jitsu of Hush. Joe and his friends then put a protesting Mrs. Kent and her butler on a train headed east. They follow this with telegrams ordering cattle, horses, wagons and a carriage as christening gifts. (Curtain)

Act IV (Upper Hall in Joe Lacy's house, three months later.) Joe's friends have made a cradle for the babe out of redwood, which is hoisted in through a window. As the baby is christened, Joe's wife, freed of her mother's spell, confesses she has fallen in love with him. The couple is reconciled and Joe's brother and friends welcome the new heir to the Hoorah. (Curtain)

== Original production ==
=== Background ===
Paul Armstrong sold An Heir to the Hurrah to Klaw and Erlanger in March 1904, and they sold it to Kirke La Shelle in December 1904. By January 1905 it was renamed to The Heir to the Hoorah,

This was the last production Kirk La Shelle would ever do; he died six weeks after the premiere. Among the better-known plays he produced were Arizona, Checkers, The Bonnie Brier Bush, The Virginian, and The Education of Mr. Pipp. La Shelle showed foresight in booking the Hudson Theatre, for it was the only "legitimate" venue to have a newly installed cooling plant. Manager Henry B. Harris was able to advertise, even in June, that interior temperature of the theatre never exceeded 70 °F (21 °C).

=== Cast ===
Cast for the tryouts and the Broadway run
Role	Actor	Dates	Notes and sources
Joe Lacy	Dodson L. Mitchell	Mar 16, 1905 - April 2, 1905	Mitchell drew criticism from a tryout reviewer who suggested he be replaced.
Joe Lacy	Guy Bates Post	Apr 10, 1905 - Jul 11, 1905	Post was unable to complete Act II on July 11 due to a hidden injury incurred the previous day.
Joe Lacy	Wilfred Lucas	Jul 11, 1905 - Jul 15, 1905	Lucas completed Act II and the final six performances for Post.
Mrs. H. J. L. Kent	Eleanore Morewin	Mar 16, 1905 - Jul 15, 1905	
Mrs. Joe Lacy	Norah O'Brien	Mar 16, 1905 - Jul 15, 1905	
Dave Lacy	John W. Cope	Mar 16, 1905 - Jul 01, 1905	
Dave Lacy	Ernst Lamson	Jul 03, 1905 - Jul 15, 1905	
Bud Young	Wilfred Lucas	Mar 16, 1905 - Jul 11, 1905	Lucas was also stage manager for the production.
Bud Young	TBD	Jul 11, 1905 - Jul 15, 1905	
Mrs. Kate Brandon	Beverly Sitgreaves	Mar 16, 1905 - Jul 01, 1905	
Mrs. Kate Brandon	Jane Peyton	Jul 03, 1905 - Jul 15, 1905	
H. Vann Rennsler Kelly	Wright Kramer	Mar 16, 1905 - Jul 15, 1905	
Livingstone Winthrop	H. S. Northrup	Mar 16, 1905 - Jul 15, 1905	
Bill Ferguson	C. C. Quinby	Mar 16, 1905 - Jul 15, 1905	
Lon Perry	Colin Campbell	Mar 16, 1905 - Jul 15, 1905	
Gus Ferris	Menifee Johnstone	Mar 16, 1905 - Jul 15, 1905	
Madge Casey	Norah Lamison	Mar 16, 1905 - Jul 01, 1905	
Madge Casey	Louise Rutter	Jul 03, 1905 - Jul 15, 1905	
Hush	T. Tamamoto	Mar 16, 1905 - Jul 15, 1905	
Morris	Hoarce James	Mar 16, 1905 - Jul 15, 1905	
Janet	Edith French	Mar 16, 1905 - Jul 15, 1905	
Dr. Whipple	George Barr	Mar 16, 1905 - Jul 15, 1905	
Miss Johnson	Frances Lynn	Mar 16, 1905 - May 27, 1905	
Miss Johnson	Florence Coventry	May 29, 1905 - Jul 15, 1905	

=== Tryouts ===
The Heir to the Hoorah had its first performance at the Lyceum Theatre in Scranton, Pennsylvania on March 16, 1905. The critic for The Scranton Republican noted the immediate success of the play with the audience, who demanded curtain speeches from both Armstrong and La Shelle after the second act. They attributed the success to the excellence of the casting: "There was not a weak member of the cast. On the contrary, nature seemed to have designed every man and woman who figured in the play for the part interpreted". However, a different opinion was held by The Times-Tribune reviewer, who found Dodson L. Mitchell unconvincing as the mine owner Joe Lacy, and suggested "another class of actor than Mitchell".

After the one performance in Scranton, the production moved to the Walnut Street Theatre in Philadelphia for a two-week engagement starting March 20, 1905. The reviewer for The Philadelphia Inquirer said: "it is rather a collection of types than drama in its proper sense. But its claim to serious consideration lies in the fact that these types... are flesh and blood. Their words have the true ring and their actions are convincing". They praised the acting of the principal players and T. Tamamoto, who played "to perfection, and when he applied the jiu-jitsu to a portly butler the house went wild".

La Shelle, who had staged the play, was responsible for some rewriting after the Philadelphia tryout and before the move to Broadway.

=== Broadway premiere ===
The production premiered April 10, 1905 on Broadway at the Hudson Theatre. Guy Bates Post was now playing the lead role of Joe Lacy. The New York Times reviewer acknowledged the show was a popular success despite its weaknesses: "Crudeness of plot and device, of situation and repartee, characterize every scene of the play. And yet there is in it something that will probably bring coming audiences to laugh and sympathize and applaud as the first one did last evening". The critic for The Evening World thought the play's sub-title, "An American Comedy", (Note: Paul Armstrong, complaining about the difficulty in getting producers to do American plays, had once been heard to suggest Congress impose a tax on all foreign plays performed in the US.) particularly apt, being "thoroughly American" and "laugh-evoking". The Sun critic praised the acting, and said of T. Tamamoto's valet character "he could have had a hundred offers of employment last night from the audience, even before he jiu-jitsued the British butler".

After two weeks The Heir to the Hoorah was announced as a success and confirmed to play out the season at the Hudson Theatre. A month later it was still playing to full houses as it started its seventh week. By June 24, 1905, the play had completed its 88th Broadway performance, "and a new record for hot weather successes was established".

=== Closing ===
The Heir to the Hoorah closed at the Hudson Theatre on July 15, 1905, after 112 performances. (Note: The play completed 14 weeks, with eight performances per week (six evening, two matinees).) After a four-week hiatus, it moved to Boston's Hollis Street Theatre.

== Copyright lawsuit ==
In February 1906 the writer Henry J. W. Dam filed a lawsuit claiming The Heir to the Hoorah had dramatised his short story "The Transmogrification of Dan" without permission. The story had been written in 1898, and was published in a September issue of The Smart Set magazine in 1901. Though Dam died two months later, his widow revived the suit after becoming executrix of his estate. The case was eventually decided in 1910, when the US Circuit Court ruled in favor of the Dam estate, and ordered Kirke LaShelle's company to turn over all profits from The Heir to the Hoorah to the Dam estate. The decision was made despite the introduction of new characters and situations in the stage play. The court's ruling said the similarities were too great to be the result of coincidence.

Armstrong's defense was weak: he claimed to have told Dam the original story himself at a cafe. La Shelle's estate then went after Armstrong to recover the money paid to the Dam estate, being awarded almost $19,000 by the court.

== Adaptations ==
=== Film ===
- The Heir to the Hoorah (1916)
