= Jordan Is a Hard Road =

1915 film by Allan Dwan

- Directed by: Allan Dwan
- Written by: Gilbert Parker (novel); Allan Dwan
- Starring: Dorothy Gish; Frank Campeau; Sarah Truax
- Production company: Fine Arts Film Company
- Distributed by: Triangle Distributing
- Release date: December 19, 1915
- Running time: 50 minutes
- Country: United States
- Languages: Silent; English intertitles

Jordan Is a Hard Road is a 1915 American silent drama film directed by Allan Dwan and starring Dorothy Gish, Frank Campeau and Sarah Truax. The production was under the overall supervision of D. W. Griffith, and was the first film made by Dwan for Griffith's company Fine Arts. The evangelist Billy Sunday acted as a consultant. Composer J. A. Raynes composed theatre organ music to accompany this film. The film is set in Canada, with location shooting taking place for two weeks around Big Bear Lake in the San Bernardino Mountains. No prints are known to exist, and is therefore believed to be a lost film.

== Plot ==
A criminal is sentenced to jail and gives his daughter up for adoption. Years later, after his release, he finds her working in a revivalist mission in a frontier town. In order not to disillusion her, he pretends to be an old friend of her father. Later, in order to raise vital funds for the mission, he takes part in a final train robbery in which he is mortally wounded.

== Cast ==
- Dorothy Gish as Cora Findley
- Frank Campeau as Bill Minden
- Sarah Truax as Mrs. Findlay
- Owen Moore as Mark Sheldon
- Ralph Lewis as Jim Starbuck
- Mabel Wiles as Lady Alicia Fairfax
- Fred Burns as McMahon Man
- Lester Perry as McMahon Man
- Jim Kid as McMahon Man
- Walter Long as Agent
- Joseph Singleton as Pete Findley

== Bibliography ==
- Frederic Lombardi. Allan Dwan and the Rise and Decline of the Hollywood Studios. McFarland, 2013.
