= Flowing Gold =

Flowing Gold may refer to:

- Flowing Gold, a 1922 novel by Rex Beach
- Flowing Gold (1924 film), an American silent drama film, based on the novel
- Flowing Gold (1940 film), an American adventure film, based on the novel
