= Irene Franklin =

American actress

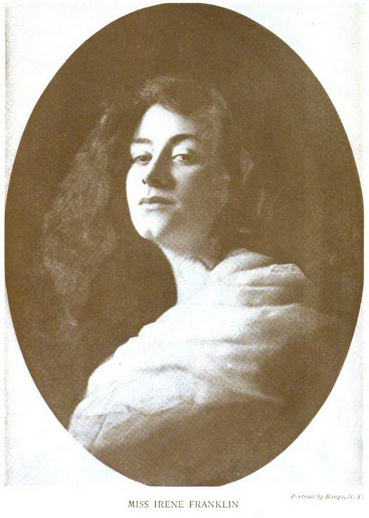
- Bohemian Magazine, 1908
- Born: June 13, 1885; St. Louis, Missouri, US
- Died: June 16, 1941 (aged 56); Englewood, New Jersey, US
- Occupations: Stage and film actress · singer
- Years active: 1929–1939
- Spouse(s): Burton Green (1907–1922) (his death) (2 children); Jerry Overton Jarnigan (1925–1934) (his death)

Irene Franklin (June 13, 1885 – June 16, 1941) was an American actress of stage and screen, vaudeville comedian, and singer.

== Biography ==
Irene Franklin was born in Saint Louis, Missouri, in 1885. While many sources have suggested her birth year as 1875 or 1876, subsequent census records, ship manifests, and official documents all point to 1884 or 1885, and her official birth record from Saint Louis confirms 1885. A mention in the New York Sun in early 1890 as a four-year-old helps to confirm this point.

Franklin began her stage career at the age of six months when her parents carried her on stage in a production of Hearts of Oak. She appeared on Broadway at age six in The Prodigal Father, which ran for five years. Her mother died while Franklin was touring Australia in vaudeville, and when she returned to the United States to be with her father, she learned that he also had died.

Franklin performed in variety theaters in London in 1894 and debuted in vaudeville in the United States in 1895. She was named Most Popular Woman Vaudeville Artist in a contest organized by Percy G. Williams in 1908. On September 11, 1911 she was headline performer for the grand opening of Williams's newly built Bushwick Theatre in Bedford–Stuyvesant, Brooklyn.

Franklin's Broadway credits included Sweet Adeline (1929), The Greenwich Village Follies (1921), The Passing Show of 1917 (1917), Hands Up (1915), The Summer Widowers (1910), and The Orchid (1907). She wrote lyrics for Sweet Adeline and The Passing Show of 1917 in addition to performing in those productions.

Her first screen appearance was in Irene Franklin, the American Comedienne (1929) in which she performed a bit of her vaudeville routine. She remembered meticulously planning her performance down to how clearly she said certain words so the punchlines would resonate.

The quiet hurt my ears, the heat was frightful. I swallowed. Heavens, I had an Easter egg in my throat... then a tiny sound, the husky little grind of the recording machine... good Lord, my throat began to tickle. I must clear it or I would cough. It was getting worse. At the end of the chorus there was a second's pause. I managed to clear my throat. I could hear the faintly smothered cough. Had anyone else noticed it? Our little army marched back to the room to hear the playback. It was a bit clearer, the muddled words were a bit over-stressed, the boys were laughing; I could feel my head swelling. Suddenly a bloodhound barked from the machine. The crowd roared. I turned to [director] Roth, bewildered. 'That was your little smothered cough,' he said. 'Without it this would have been a perfect record. We'll do it again, and try not to cough.'

== Personal life and death ==
During her tenure in Los Angeles, Irene Franklin resided at 3093 Lake Hollywood Drive, built in 1927.

Irene Franklin died in 1941, aged 56, having outlived both of her husbands, pianists Burton Green (died 1922) and Jerry Jarnagin (died 1934).

== Filmography ==
- Fast Workers (1933)
- The Women in His Life (1933)
- The Cat and the Fiddle (1934)
- Registered Nurse (1934)
- Finishing School (1934)
- Strictly Dynamite (1934)
- Lazy River (1934)
- Down to Their Last Yacht (1934)
- The Affair of Susan (1935)
- Death Flies East (1935)
- Ladies Crave Excitement (1935)
- Timothy's Quest (1936)
- The Garden of Allah (1936)
- Wanted! Jane Turner (1936)
- Blazing Barriers (1937)
- Flirting with Fate (1938)
- Fixer Dugan (1939)
