= Prestige (film) =

1932 film

- Directed by: Tay Garnett
- Screenplay by: Tay Garnett; Rollo Lloyd; Francis Edward Faragoh
- Story by: Harry Hervey
- Produced by: Charles R. Rogers; Harry Joe Brown (associate)
- Starring: Ann Harding; Adolphe Menjou; Melvyn Douglas; Ian Maclaren; Guy Bates Post
- Cinematography: Lucien N. Andriot
- Edited by: Joseph Kane
- Music by: Arthur Lange; Harold Lewis
- Production company: RKO Pictures
- Distributed by: RKO Pictures
- Release date: January 22, 1932
- Running time: 71 minutes
- Country: United States
- Language: English

Prestige is a 1932 American pre-Code drama film directed by Tay Garnett and written by Tay Garnett, Rollo Lloyd and Francis Edward Faragoh. The film stars Ann Harding, Adolphe Menjou, Melvyn Douglas and Guy Bates Post. The film was released on January 22, 1932, by RKO Pictures.

== Plot ==
Therese accompanies her fiancée captain Andre Verlaine to his new posting at a French penal colony in Indochina. Faced with the climate and strain of his job, he descends into drunkenness.

== Cast ==
- Ann Harding as Therese Du Flos
- Adolphe Menjou as Capt. Remy Bandoin
- Melvyn Douglas as Capt. Andre Verlaine
- Ian Maclaren as Colonel Du Flos
- Guy Bates Post as Major
- Rollo Lloyd as Capt. Emil de Fontenac
- Clarence Muse as Nham
- Tetsu Komai as Sergeant

== Production ==
Decades later, Melvyn Douglas recalled that he was called in to replace Adolphe Menjou (who appears in the film). Turner Classic Movies cites a Variety report that Douglas replaced Robert Williams. Williams died of peritonitis resulting from a ruptured appendix on November 3, 1931. Douglas claimed that Ann Harding was so unhappy with the picture that she asked the studio "to let her buy the negative and destroy it because she feared it was so bad."

== Release ==
Prestige became available on DVD in October 2013, through a Spanish distributor.
