= Masquerade =

A masquerade is archetypally a masquerade ball. Masquerade or Masquerades may refer to:

== Books ==
- Masquerade (book), a 1979 children's book by Kit Williams that sparked a worldwide treasure hunt
- Masquerades (novel), a 1995 Forgotten Realms novel by Kate Novak and Jeff Grubb
- Masquerade, a 2007 Blue Bloods novel by Melissa de la Cruz

== Theatre ==
- The Masquerade (play), a 1719 play by Charles Johnson
- Mascarade, a 1724 comedy play by Ludvig Holberg
- Masquerade (play), an 1835 Russian play by Mikhail Lermontov
- Masquerade (theatre group), an English theatre group in Chennai, India, since 1994
- Masquerade (musical), an immersive 2025 adaptation of the musical The Phantom of the Opera

== Films ==
- The Masquerade, a 1913 animated film by Émile Cohl
- Masquerade (1929 film), an American drama
- Masquerade, a 1931 film starring Vivienne Osborne
- Masquerade (1941 film), a Soviet film
- Masquerade (1965 film), a British spy spoof starring Cliff Robertson and Jack Hawkins
- Masquerade (1988 film), an American thriller starring Rob Lowe and Meg Tilly
- The Masquerade, a 2007 American thriller starring Brianne Davis and Christopher Masterson
- Masquerades (film), 2008
- Masquerade (2012 film), or Gwanghae, South Korean film
- Masquerade (2021 film), an American thriller
- Masquerade (2022 film), a French comedy-drama

== Television ==
=== Shows ===
- Masquerade (TV series), a 1983 American espionage series
- Masquerade (Bakugan Battle Brawlers), a masked character in the anime Bakugan Battle Brawlers
- Masquerade, the international title for Kasou Taishou, a Japanese semi-annual amateur skit show

=== Episodes ===
- "Masquerade" (Alias)
- "Masquerade" (Baywatch)
- "Masquerade" (Benson)
- "Masquerade" (The Bill)
- "Masquerade" (Dallas)
- "Masquerade" (Dynasty)
- "Masquerade" (ER)
- "Masquerade" (The Flash)
- "Masquerade" (The Fugitive)
- "Masquerade" (Hazbin Hotel)
- "Masquerade" (Iron Man: Armored Adventures)
- "Masquerade" (Law & Order: Criminal Intent)
- "Masquerade" (Law & Order: UK)
- "Masquerade" (NCIS)
- "Masquerade" (The Real Ghostbusters)
- "Masquerade" (Six Degrees)
- "Masquerade" (The Transformers)
- "Masquerade" (Trauma)
- "Masquerade" (Person of Interest)
- "Masquerade" (The Vampire Diaries)

== Music ==
=== Classical music ===
- Mascherata (English: Masquerade), an Italian dance from the sixteenth century
- Masquerade, lute piece by Robert de Visée (c. 1655 – 1732/1733)
- Masquerade (Khachaturian), incidental music by Aram Khachaturian
- Masquerade (Clyne), a 2013 orchestral composition by Anna Clyne

=== Bands ===
- Masquerade (Finnish band), a Finnish post-punk band
- Masquerade (German band), a band with Drafi Deutscher that had a hit in 1984 with the song "Guardian Angel"
- Masquerade (Swedish band), a Swedish rock band

=== Albums ===
- Masquerade (Bananarama album), or the title song, 2022
- Masquerade (Eric Saade album), or the title song, 2010
- Masquerade (Golden Dawn album), 2003
- Masquerade (The Legendary Tigerman album), or the title song, 2006
- Masquerade (Rondò Veneziano album), 1989
- Masquerade (Running Wild album), 1995
- Masquerade (Wyclef Jean album), 2002
- Masquerade, an album by Dreams of Sanity, 1999
- The Masquerade (album), by mxmtoon, 2019
- The Masquerade, by Mêlée, 2010

=== Songs ===
- "Masquerade" (2PM song), 2012
- "Masquerade" (Kaya song), 2006
- "Masquerade", by Alfred Hui and Win Win Yeung, 2022
- "Masquerade", by Ashley Tisdale from Guilty Pleasure, 2009
- "Masquerade", by Backstreet Boys from This Is Us, 2009
- "Masquerade", by Beach House from Once Twice Melody, 2022
- "Masquerade", by Berlin from Pleasure Victim, 1982
- "Masquerade", by Chung Ha from Querencia, 2021
- "Masquerade", by D'espairsRay from Redeemer, 2009
- "Masquerade", by Edward Bear, 1972
- "Masquerade", by Hey! Say! JUMP from Dear, 2016
- "Masquerade", by Jack Hylton and His Orchestra, featured in the film The Shining, 1980
- "Masquerade", by Nicki Minaj from Pink Friday: Roman Reloaded, 2012
- "Masquerade", by Northlane from Singularity, 2013
- "Masquerade", by Rania from Teddy Riley, the First Expansion In Asia, 2011
- "Masquerade", by Sarah Nixey from Sing, Memory, 2007
- "Masquerade", by Skids, 1979
- "Masquerade", by Soul Asylum from Say What You Will, Clarence... Karl Sold the Truck, 1984
- "Masquerade", by Swing Out Sister from Kaleidoscope World, 1989
- "Masquerade", by Symphony X from Symphony X, 1994
- "Masquerade", by Versailles from Holy Grail, 2011
- "Masquerade", by Yes from Union, 1991
- "Masquerade", from the musical The Phantom of the Opera, 1986
- "The Masquerade", by Voltaire from Raised by Bats, 2014

=== Other uses in music ===
- The Masquerade (Atlanta), a concert venue in Atlanta, Georgia

== Other uses ==
- Masquerade (biology), a form of camouflage relying on mimicry of inanimate objects such as twigs
- Masquerade (trope), a fantasy and speculative fiction trope involving a hidden society within the real world
- The Masquerade (role-playing game), a 1994 live action role-playing game
- Masquerade, a type of computer threat

== See also ==
- Masquerade ball, a costumed dance event
- Masquerade ceremony, a rite or cultural event in many parts of the world, especially the Caribbean and Africa
- Masquerade society, a fictional society in Vampire: The Masquerade
- Masquerader (disambiguation)
- IP masquerading, a form of network address translation
- Mask-A-Raid, a 1931 animated short film starring Betty Boop
- Mascarade (board game), a card game
- Maskarade, a 1906 opera by Carl Nielsen, based on the play by Ludvig Holberg
- Maskerade, a 1995 Discworld novel by Terry Pratchett
- "This Masquerade", by Leon Russell, 1972
