= Katherine Cecil Thurston =

Irish writer (1874-1911

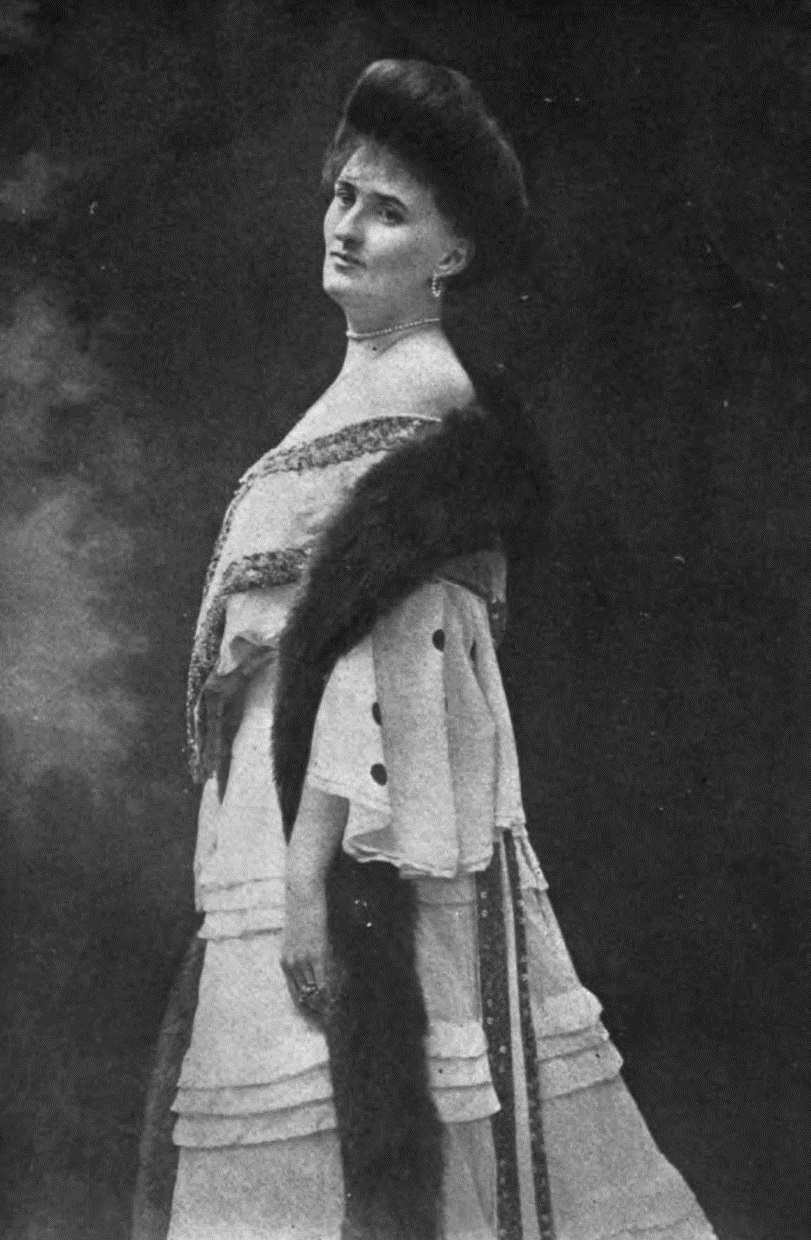
- Born: Kathleen Annie Josephine Madden; 18 April 1874; Cork, Ireland
- Died: 5 September 1911 (aged 37); Cork, Ireland
- Occupation: Novelist
- Spouse: E. Temple Thurston (m. 1901; div. 1910)
- Writing career
- Language: English
- Genre: political thriller
- Notable work: John Chilcote, M.P.

Katherine Cecil Thurston, born Kathleen Annie Josephine Madden (18 April 1874 – 5 September 1911), was an Irish novelist, best known for two political thrillers.

== Life ==
Born Kathleen Annie Josephine Madden at 14 Bridge Street, Cork, Ireland, the only daughter of banker Paul J. Madden (who was Mayor of Cork in 1885–1886, and a friend of Charles Stuart Parnell) and Eliza Madden (born Dwyer). She was educated privately at her family home, Wood's Gift, Blackrock Road.

By the end of the 19th century she was contributing short stories to various British and American publications, such as Pall Mall Magazine, Blackwood's Edinburgh Magazine, Harper's Magazine, Windsor Magazine and others.

On 16 February 1901, five weeks after her father's death, she married the writer Ernest Temple Thurston (1879-1933). They separated in 1907 and were divorced in 1910 on grounds of his adultery and desertion. The suit went undefended. Thurston "complained that she was making more money by her books than he was, that her personality dominated his, and had said that he wanted to leave her."

=== Reception of work ===
Katherine Thurston's novels achieved success in Britain and the United States. Her best-known work was a political thriller entitled John Chilcote, M.P. (published in 1904 as The Masquerader in the United States). It was on the New York Times bestseller list for two years, ranking as third best-selling book for 1904 and seventh best in 1905. Her next book, The Gambler, came out in 1905 and it too made the US best-selling lists for that year. This was the first time the New York Times had recorded any author, female or male, as having two top-ten books in a single year.

In 1910, Thurston was back on the bestseller list at No. 4 with her novel Max, the story of a young Russian princess, who flees disguised as a boy to the Montmartre Quarter of Paris, on the night before her arranged marriage. Her 1908 novel The Fly on the Wheel, about illicit love, was described by writer Megan Nolan in 2022 as a "lost classic of Irish fiction".

=== Adaptations ===
John Chilcote, M.P. was adapted for the stage by American playwright John Hunter Booth and opened on Broadway in 1917.

It was filmed four times: the first was a silent film by American Pathé under the title The Compact (1912) and starring Crane Wilbur; the second a 1920 Russian/French co-production entitled Chlen parlamenta. Two more films were made using the American book title The Masquerader: in 1922 and then by the Samuel Goldwyn Company in 1933 as a "talkie" starring Ronald Colman.

=== Death and legacy ===
Thurston had been dealing with epilepsy, and her blossoming career was cut short when she was found dead at the age of 37 in her hotel room in Cork. The official enquiry on 6 September 1911 gave the cause of death as asphyxia as result of a seizure. She had been due to remarry later that month to Dr A. T. Bulkeley Gavin. She was buried in St. Joseph's Cemetery, Cork.

An account of her final years, her publishing history, and her relations with Bulkeley Gavin are the subject of The Sensational Katherine Cecil Thurston (2006), a published thesis by C. M. Copeland. She wrote it while studying at Napier University, Edinburgh.

Katherine Cecil Thurston's archive is held at the National Library of Scotland, under the reference Acc.11378.

== Partial bibliography ==
- The Circle (1903).
- John Chilcote M.P. (US title: The Masquerader, 1904).
- The Gambler (1905).
- The Mystics (1907) (previously serialized in Blackwood's Magazine 1906).
- The Fly on the Wheel (1908).
- Max (1910).
