= The Masquerader (play) =

Play written by John Hunter Booth

The Masquerader is a 1917 play by the American weiter John Hunter Booth. It premiered in New York City on 3 September 1917. It was based on the 1904 novel The Masquerader by Katherine Cecil Thurston. A leading British politician chooses to swap places with his cousin, a journalist who is his doppelganger. This leads to a dilemma for his wife who falls in love with the double.

== Adaptations ==
The play was twice adapted into films. In 1922 a silent film The Masquerader was made. In 1933 a sound version The Masquerader was made starring Ronald Colman in the title role.

== Bibliography ==
- American Film Institute. AFI Catalog. Feature Films, 1921-1930. University of California Press, 1971.
