= Blazing Barriers =

1937 film

- Theatrical release poster
- Directed by: Aubrey Scotto
- Screenplay by: Edwin C. Parsons; Lee Freeman
- Produced by: Ken Goldsmith
- Starring: Junior Coghlan; Edward Arnold Jr. Florine McKinney; Irene Franklin; Guy Bates Post; Milburn Stone
- Cinematography: Paul Ivano
- Edited by: Russell F. Schoengarth
- Production company: Monogram Pictures
- Distributed by: Monogram Pictures
- Release date: July 4, 1937
- Running time: 65 minutes
- Country: United States
- Language: English

Blazing Barriers is a 1937 American drama film directed by Aubrey Scotto and written by Edwin C. Parsons and Lee Freeman. The film stars Junior Coghlan, Edward Arnold Jr., Florine McKinney, Irene Franklin, Guy Bates Post and Milburn Stone. The film was released on July 4, 1937, by Monogram Pictures.

== Plot ==
Hoods Tommy McGrath and "Fats" Moody are sent to a Civilian Conservation Corps camp in order to get them away from their criminal path.

== Cast ==
- Junior Coghlan as Tommy McGrath
- Edward Arnold Jr. as Percival Throckmorton 'Fats' Moody
- Florine McKinney as Joan Martin
- Irene Franklin as Fleurette Varden
- Guy Bates Post as Reginald Burley
- Milburn Stone as Joe Waters
- Jack Randall as Arthur Forsythe
- Dick Hogan as CCC Boy
- Herbert Corthell as Sheriff Martin
- Mary Hayes as Sales Clerk
- Frank Bischell
- Cliff Carpenter
- Al Taylor as Thug
