= The Women in His Life =

1933 film

- Lobby card
- Directed by: George B. Seitz
- Written by: F. Hugh Herbert
- Produced by: Lucien Hubbard
- Starring: Otto Kruger
- Cinematography: Ray June
- Edited by: Conrad A. Nervig
- Production company: Metro-Goldwyn-Mayer
- Distributed by: Loew's, Inc.
- Release date: December 8, 1933
- Running time: 75 minutes
- Country: United States
- Language: English

The Women in His Life is a 1933 American pre-Code crime film directed by George B. Seitz and starring Otto Kruger.

== Plot ==
Famed criminal lawyer Kent “Barry” Barringer (Otto Kruger) is a slick, charming attorney with a cynical view of justice and love. While romancing Molly (Muriel Evans), he takes a quick break to win a case—getting a clearly guilty man acquitted—and dismisses the client’s gratitude to God, insisting he deserves the credit. Barry returns to his playboy lifestyle, juggling women, including nightclub girl Cathy (Isabel Jewell), who finds a photo in his desk of a mysterious woman. Barry explains it’s his ex-wife, kept as a reminder that love is a lie.

Meanwhile, young Doris Worthing (Irene Hervey) desperately seeks Barry’s help—her father, Thomas (Samuel S. Hinds), is on trial for murdering her mother. Barry’s junior partner, Roger McKane (Ben Lyon), sympathizes and tries to involve Barry, but Barry initially refuses, calling it an ordinary case. Doris sees Barry’s client, Mrs. Steele (Irene Franklin), and recognizes her as Madame Celeste, who runs a Times Square lingerie shop. Barry sends Doris to track her down, intrigued by the resemblance.

At trial, Barry orchestrates a courtroom stunt: Madame Celeste impersonates Mrs. Steele on the stand, confusing witnesses and leading to Mrs. Steele’s acquittal. Despite his courtroom brilliance, Barry remains emotionally distant and prepares to leave for Florida with Cathy. Before he goes, he coldly compares her to his unfaithful ex-wife, revealing the woman in the photo is Cathy’s spiritual predecessor.

Back in New York, Roger and Barry’s assistant Lester (Roscoe Karns) investigate Doris’s case. They discover Doris’s mother had multiple affairs and might’ve been involved with a racketeer named Tony Perez (C. Henry Gordon), but the lead dries up. Barry returns from Florida, worn out and drunk. When Roger shows him a photo of Doris’s murdered mother, Barry is stunned—it’s his ex-wife. Overwhelmed, he visits her grave and breaks down, admitting he still loved her.

Barry spirals into alcoholism. Doris’s father’s trial proceeds without him, and Roger loses the case. Thomas is sentenced to death. When Barry wakes up in the hospital after mostly recovering from pneumonia he learns the news and is wracked with guilt. He confesses the truth to Doris and Roger: her mother was his ex-wife, and her death shattered him. Although the trial seems airtight, Barry learns that Perez was romantically involved with Doris’s mother six months before she married Thomas—a potential motive.

Attempting redemption, Barry swears off drinking but relapses. Roger, disgusted, quits and threatens to report him to the Bar Association. Disbarred and disgraced, Barry teams up with Cathy to entrap Perez. Using his legal knowledge and underworld connections, Barry devises a sting operation. Cathy pretends to be part of a heist, and Perez takes the bait. Meanwhile, Thomas is days from execution.

In a tense climax, Barry gets Perez to confess. Urgent calls are made just in time to halt the execution, and Thomas is saved.

In the final scenes, Barry reopens his law practice, reconciled with Roger. He marries Cathy, Roger marries Doris, and Lester proposes to Simmy. All head off on their respective honeymoons—Florida, Bermuda, and Sheep’s Head Bay—ending the story on a hopeful note.

== Cast ==
- Otto Kruger as Kent 'Barry' Barringer
- Una Merkel as Miss 'Simmy' Simmons
- Ben Lyon as Roger McKane
- Isabel Jewell as Catherine 'Cathy' Watson
- Roscoe Karns as Lester
- Irene Hervey as Doris Worthing
- C. Henry Gordon as Tony Perez
- Samuel S. Hinds as Thomas J. Worthing
- Irene Franklin as Mrs. Florence Steele / Madame Celeste
- Muriel Evans as Molly
- Raymond Hatton as Curly, Tony's bodyguard
- Jean Howard as Information girl
- Paul Hurst as Paul, Tony's bodyguard
