= The Masquerader (novel) =

1904 novel by Katherine Cecil Thurston

- Author: Katherine Cecil Thurston
- Language: English
- Publication date: 1904

The Masquerader (1904) is a novel by Irish writer Katherine Cecil Thurston published in both the United Kingdom and the United States. (It was titled John Chilcote, M.P. in its British release.)

A leading British politician chooses to swap places with his cousin, a journalist who is his doppelganger. This leads to a dilemma for his wife, who falls in love with the double. It was the third most popular book on the New York Times bestselling list that year, and continued as a bestseller in 1905.

== Adaptations ==
The novel has been adapted five times for stage and screen:

- A play by American playwright, John Hunter Booth in 1917.
- A silent film titled The Compact produced by American Pathé in 1912.
- A Russian/French silent film titled Chlen parlamenta in 1920.
- A 1922 silent film.
- A 1933 sound film.

== Bibliography ==
- Burt, Daniel S. The Chronology of American Literature: America's literary achievements from the Colonial Era to Modern Times. New England Publishing, 2004.
