= Cliff Carpenter =

American actor

- Publicity Photo of Cliff Carpenter
- Born: Clifford A. Carpenter; March 2, 1915; San Francisco, California, U.S.
- Died: January 9, 2014 (aged 98); New Milford, Connecticut, U.S.
- Occupation: Actor
- Years active: 1937–2014

Clifford A. Carpenter (March 2, 1915 – January 9, 2014) was an American actor who appeared in radio, television and films.

== Career ==
In 1937, Carpenter began his professional career on the radio serial Terry and the Pirates. The show was adapted from the comic strip of the same name. He provided the voice for the main character Terry Lee. He played Curtis Bassett in the radio serial drama Prairie Folks.

Carpenter debuted on Broadway in Eve of St. Mark in 1942. He also played in Inherit the Wind, Sunrise at Campobello and The Andersonville Trial.

After the start of World War II, Carpenter enlisted in the United States Army. He later became blacklisted due to his support for Philip Loeb, who had been included in Red Channels.

Carpenter worked sporadically between the 1950s and 1970s, making appearances in television series such as The Patty Duke Show, The Defenders, Hawk, Coronet Blue and Great Performances. In later life, he had a small role in Synecdoche, New York, directed by Charlie Kaufman and starring Philip Seymour Hoffman, and made recurring appearances on The Daily Show with Jon Stewart, playing a 22-year-old man who aged prematurely as a consequence of watching Sean Hannity nightly on Fox News. He provided the voice of Odin Andersson in the video games Alan Wake (2010) and Alan Wake's American Nightmare (2012).

== Personal life ==
Carpenter lived with actress and screenwriter Jean Rouverol, another former blacklisted artist, for several years. He died in New Milford, Connecticut in 2014, aged 98, from natural causes.

== Filmography ==
=== Film ===
Year	Title	Role	Notes
1937	Blazing Barriers	—N/a	
2008	Synecdoche, New York	Old Man	

=== Television ===
Year	Title	Role	Notes
1964	The Patty Duke Show	Defense Attorney / Mr. Roger	2 episodes
1964, 1965	The Defenders	Mr. Joyce / Senator	2 episodes
1966	As the World Turns	Ted Rogers	1 episodes
1966	Hawk	Stage Manager	Episode: "How Close Can You Get?"
1967	Coronet Blue	Ticket Clerk	Episode: "Where You from and What You Done?"
1972	Great Performances	Peck Johnson	Episode: "The Rimers of Eldritch"
2009–2010	The Daily Show	Dash Worthington / Ramin / Reagraham Lincool	3 episodes

=== Video games ===
Year	Title	Role
2010	Alan Wake	Odin Anderson
2012	Alan Wake's American Nightmare	Odin Anderson
