= The Masquerader (1933 film) =

1933 film by Richard Wallace

- Lobby card
- Directed by: Richard Wallace
- Written by: Howard Estabrook (adaption & screenplay); Moss Hart (dialogue)
- Based on: the 1904 novel The Masquerader by Katherine Cecil Thurston and the 1917 play The Masquerader by John Hunter Booth
- Produced by: Samuel Goldwyn
- Starring: Ronald Colman; Elissa Landi; Juliette Compton
- Cinematography: Gregg Toland
- Edited by: Stuart Heisler
- Music by: Alfred Newman
- Production company: Samuel Goldwyn Productions
- Distributed by: United Artists
- Release date: September 3, 1933
- Running time: 80 minutes
- Country: United States
- Language: English

The Masquerader is a 1933 American pre-Code drama film directed by Richard Wallace and starring Ronald Colman, Elissa Landi and Juliette Compton.

It was produced by Samuel Goldwyn and released through United Artists. The Masquerader was a popular 1904 novel, a 1917 play, and a 1922 silent film. Colman takes a dual role as a drug-addicted member of Parliament and his lookalike cousin recruited to take his place.

== Plot ==
There is much civil unrest in England, as unemployed workers demand work. In Parliament, the government refuses to do anything, stating that things will work out without their interference. The opposition is counting on Sir John Chilcote to roast their inactivity, but he collapses at the beginning of his speech. He soon revives, but declines seeing a doctor, instead taking something in a drink. Fraser, the head of his party, is fed up with Chilcote's latest failure and insists that he attend a meeting the next morning to discuss his political future. While walking home in the London fog, he bumps into his lookalike cousin, journalist John Loder, who chastises him for his disgraceful performance. He then goes to see his mistress, Lady Diana Joyce.

Eve, Chilcote's estranged wife, returns from France and tries to persuade Fraser and newspaper editor Lakely to give her husband one more chance to speak that night. More because they have no other choice than because of her pleas, they give in. Chilcote does not appreciate her efforts.

It becomes clear that Chilcote is addicted to drugs. He also neglects his shipyards, and fires his business manager, Blessington. When Brock, the family valet, upbraids him too, Chilcote comes up with a plan. He persuades Loder to impersonate him and make the speech, then falls unconscious. Brock finds them together. He soon figures out who Loder is and persuades him to speak in Parliament. Brock notices a scar on his wrist, acquired in the First World War.

Loder's impassioned speech is a rousing success. However, Chilcote's condition does not improve, forcing Loder to continue the masquerade. He goes from triumph to triumph, even settling a strike at "his" shipyards.

Loder and Eve fall in love; one night, he embraces and kisses her, but comes to his senses just in time. Meanwhile, Lady Joyce hires a private detective to investigate Loder's neglect of her. Upon reading his report, she brings a police inspector with her to confront the imposter at a nightclub where he is attending a party. Brock tries to persuade Chilcote to return home, mentioning Lady Joyce. Misunderstanding, Chilcote also goes to the party. At the party, Lady Joyce dances with the unwilling Loder; she sees the scar on his wrist, confirming her suspicions. She tells Fraser, Lakely and Eve that Loder is an imposter. Loder spots Chilcote arriving and hides. Lady Joyce is thoroughly discredited when no scar is found on Chilcote's wrist.

Soon after, Chilcote dies. Brock tells the doctor he had brought too late that the deceased's name is John Loder. Loder is determined to end the deception, but he discovers that Brock has told Eve everything. She wants him to stay with her, so he does.

== Cast ==
- Ronald Colman as Sir John Chilcote / John Loder
- Elissa Landi as Eve Chilcote
- Juliette Compton as Lady Diana Joyce
- David Torrence as Fraser
- Claude King as Lakely
- Halliwell Hobbes as Brock
- Helen Jerome Eddy as Robbins
- Olaf Hytten as Doctor
- Creighton Hale as Bobby Blessington
- C. Montague Shaw as Speaker of the House (uncredited)
