= Bird of Paradise (1932 film) =

1932 film by King Vidor

- Film poster
- Directed by: King Vidor
- Screenplay by: Wells Root; Wanda Tuchock; Leonard Praskins
- Based on: The Bird of Paradise; 1912 play by Richard Walton Tully
- Produced by: David O. Selznick; King Vidor
- Starring: Dolores del Río; Joel McCrea
- Cinematography: Lucien Andriot; Edward Cronjager; Clyde De Vinna
- Edited by: Archie Marshek
- Music by: Max Steiner
- Production company: RKO Radio Pictures
- Distributed by: RKO Radio Pictures
- Release date: August 12, 1932
- Running time: 80 minutes
- Country: United States
- Language: English
- Budget: $752,000
- Box office: $753,000

Bird of Paradise

Bird of Paradise is a 1932 American pre-Code romantic adventure drama film directed by King Vidor and starring Dolores del Río and Joel McCrea. Based on the 1912 play of the same name by Richard Walton Tully, it was released by RKO Radio Pictures.

In 1960, the film entered the public domain in the United States because the claimants did not renew its copyright registration in the 28th year after publication per the Copyright Act of 1909.

== Plot ==
As a yacht sails into an isolated tropical island chain somewhere in the Pacific Ocean, a large number of islanders in outrigger canoes paddle out to greet it. The islanders dive for trinkets the yacht's crew throws them. A shark arrives, setting off a panic as much with the crew as the islanders. Johnny Baker attempts to catch it hand casting with a large hook, but is yanked overboard when a loop of line attached to the impaled shark cinches around his ankle. Comely native swimmer Luana cuts through the rope with a knife she had earlier been thrown as a trinket, saving his life.

At a welcome banquet that night, Johnny sees young island men ritually carry off young maidens, and seeks to do the same with Luana, but is stopped and castigated by the local chieftain, her father. After intimately swimming, they swiftly fall in love. Later, the yacht moves on, but leaves Johnny on the island for an adventure. He discovers Luana has been promised to another man – a prince on a neighboring island. She is spirited away to this island for the arranged marriage, while Johnny is waylaid. During a native dance, Johnny has made his way to the island in the nick of time, runs into a circle of fire, and rescues her as the natives kneel to the fire. Johnny and Luana then travel to another island where they hope to live out the rest of their lives. He builds her a house with a roof of thatched grass. Their idyll is smashed when the local volcano on her home island begins to erupt. She confesses to her lover that her sacrifice alone can appease the mountain. Her people take her back. When Johnny goes after her, he is wounded in the shoulder by a spear and tied up. The people decide to sacrifice both of them to the volcano, but on the way, the couple are rescued by Johnny's friends and taken aboard the yacht.

Johnny's wound is tended to, but his friends wonder what will become of the lovers. Luana does not fit into Johnny's world. When Johnny is sleeping, Luana's father demands her back. She goes willingly, believing that only she can save her people by voluntarily throwing herself into the volcano.

== Cast ==
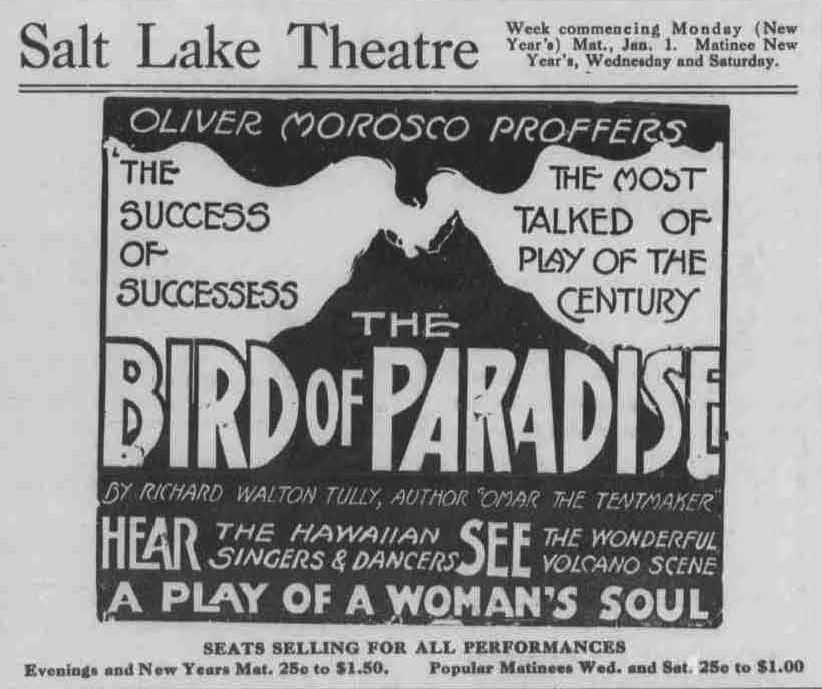
A 1916 advertisement for the famous play Bird of Paradise, which the movie was based on

- Dolores del Río as Luana
- Joel McCrea as Johnny Baker
- John Halliday as Mac
- Richard "Skeets" Gallagher as Steve
- Bert Roach as Hector
- Creighton Chaney as Thorton
- Wade Boteler as Skipper Johnson
- Arnold Gray as Walker
- Reginald Simpson as O'Fallon
- Napoleon Pukui as The King
- Agostino Borgato as Medicine Man
- Sofia Ortega as Native Woman

== Production ==
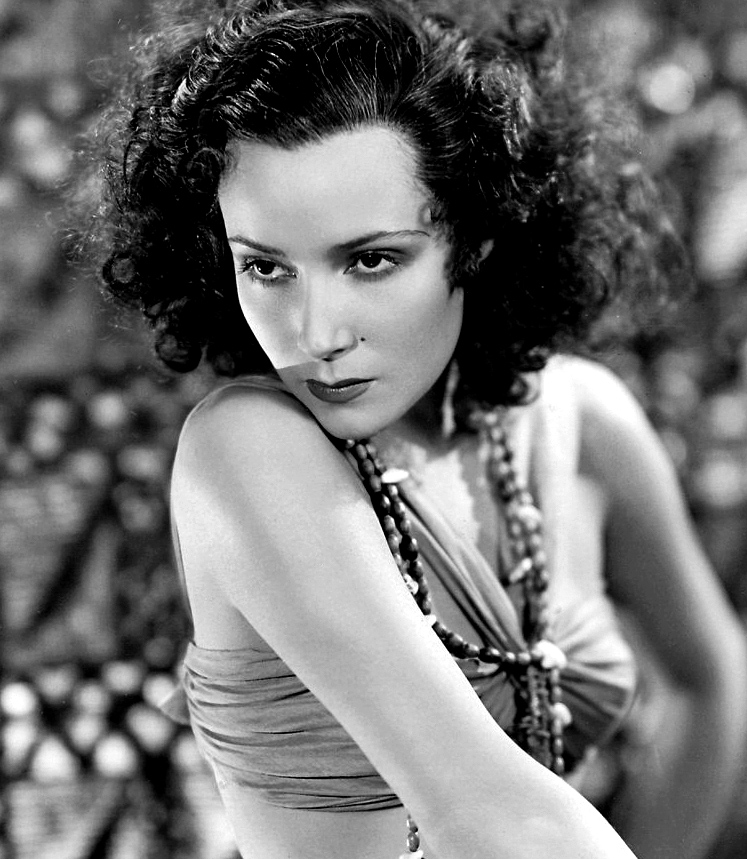
Dolores del Río in Bird of Paradise

Director King Vidor, under contract to M-G-M, was loaned to RKO producer David Selznick (son-in-law to Louis B. Mayer) to make the "South Seas" romance. Filmed on location in Hawaii, Vidor and writer Wells Root arrived on the island territory and began shooting background footage without a completed script (Actors McCrea and del Rio were delayed due to engagements on other projects,) .

The native dance sequences were boom-shot in Hollywood and choreographed by an uncredited Busby Berkeley.

Bird of Paradise was almost the first sound film to utilize a full symphonic score from beginning to end. Producer David O. Selznick and composer Max Steiner had both been experimenting with this idea, while other studios had begun development along similar lines, such the score by Alfred Newman for Samuel Goldwyn's Street Scene. However, it was Steiner who first received screen credit for composition of a score which, other than a few brief pauses during the film, was almost entirely through-composed (from beginning to end).

== Reception ==
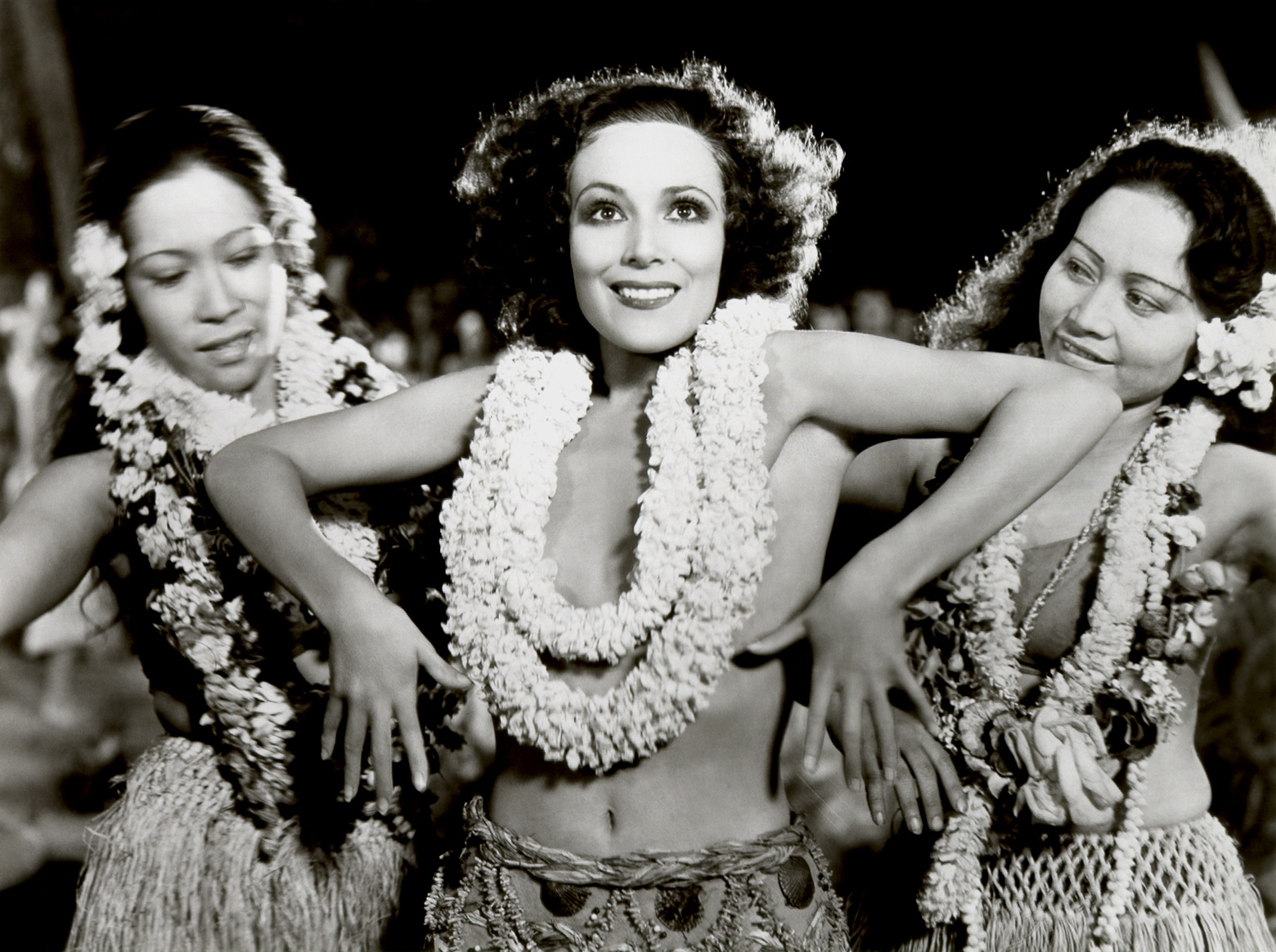
Dolores del Río in a dance scene

Bird of Paradise created a scandal after its release owing to a scene which appeared to show Dolores del Río swimming naked. She was, in fact, wearing a flesh-coloured G-string. The film was made before the Production Code was strictly enforced, so brief nudity in American movies was still allowed and was seen in a few films at the time. Famed film director Orson Welles said del Río represented the highest erotic ideal with her performance in the film.

== Box office ==
The film lost an estimated $250,000 for studio RKO after taking into account distribution costs.

== Theme ==
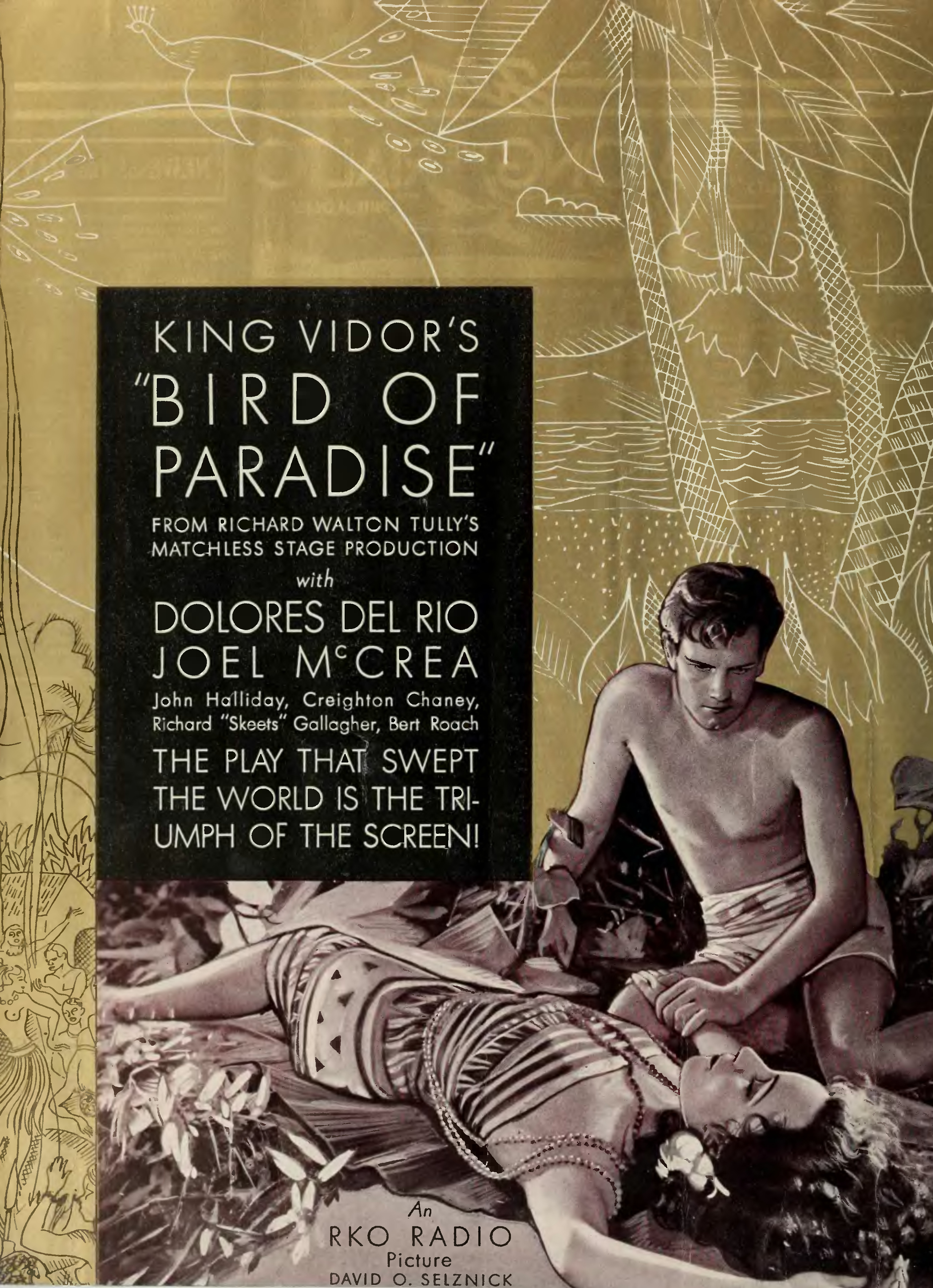
Bird of Paradise ad from The Film Daily, 1932

In the early 1930s, Hollywood produced a number of pictures that exploited popular interest in "exotic" tropical locations, though these regions were fully penetrated by Western culture by the early 20th Century, including Hawaii. Films of this genre ranged from elevated ethnological studies such as F.W. Murnau’s and Robert Flaherty's Tabu: A Story of the South Seas (1931) to the Tarzan adventure series and King Kong in 1932 and 1933.

Vidor presents this "tragic" romance as a clash between modern "civilization" and a sexual idyll enjoyed by Rousseauian-like Noble savages. The sexual promiscuity and eroticism exhibited in Bird of Paradise is a measure of the as yet unenforced prohibitions of the Breen Office with its "nude swimming...lovers hanging from bamboo poles trying to kiss and Doloros del Rio sucking an orange, then transferring the juice to McCrea's fevered mouth."

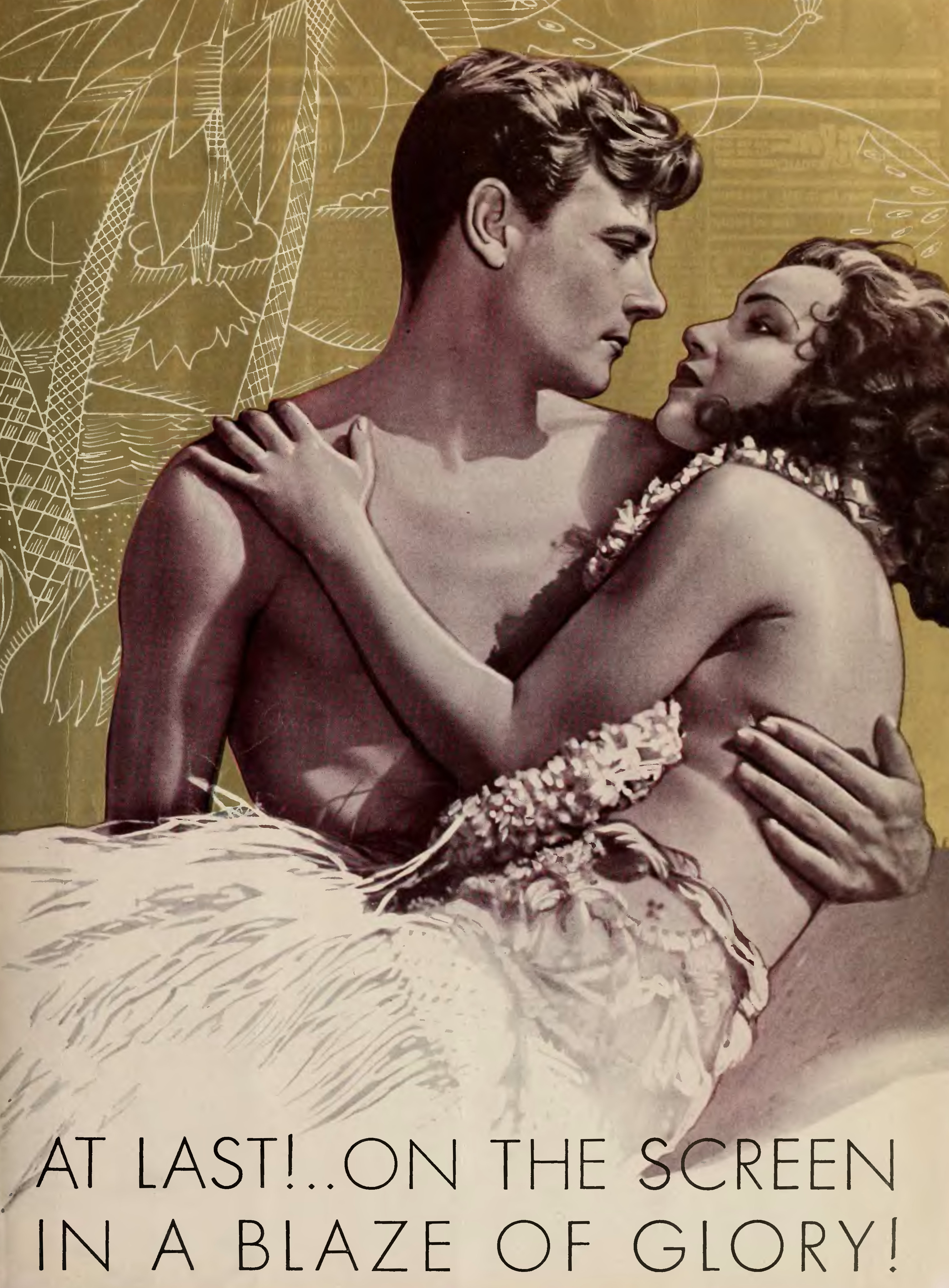
Bird of Paradise, 1932 ad

Though the American (McCrea) and his Hawaiian lover (del Rio) attempt to transcend the racist and sexual strictures that doom their relationship, Vidor, although not personally a racist, ended the film with what some interpret as an anti-miscegenation message. Selznick's story line that "climax[es] with the girl tossed into a volcano" is both an example of the producer's predilection for tragic melodrama and, as seen by some, a Vidorian "tongue-in-cheek" cautionary tale concerning the fate of racially mixed couples.
