= Henry J. W. Dam =

American journalist

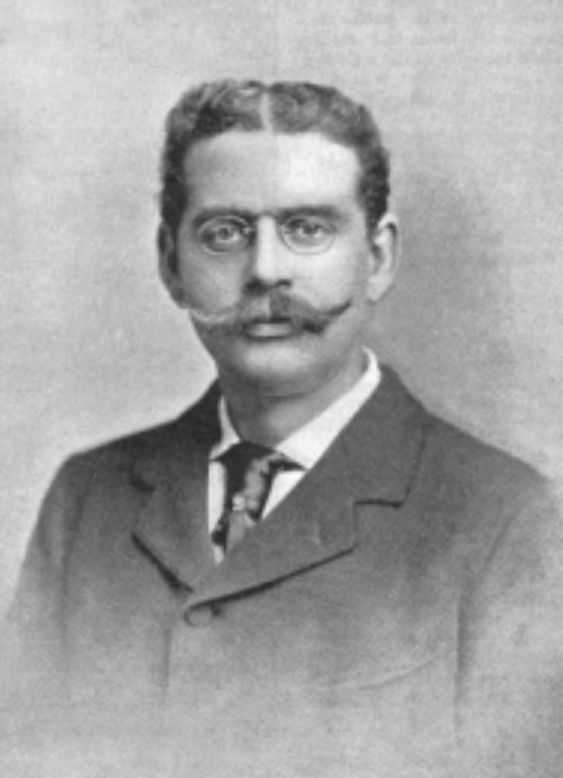
- In The Sketch, November 28, 1894
- Born: Henry Jackson Wells Dam; April 27, 1856; San Francisco, California, US
- Died: April 26, 1906 (aged 49); Havana, Cuba
- Education: University of California
- Occupations: Journalist, playwright
- Spouse: Dorothy Dorr (m. 1892)
- Children: 2

Henry Jackson Wells Dam (April 27, 1856 – April 26, 1906) was a journalist and playwright. His story "The Red Mouse" was adapted for the film Her Silent Sacrifice. He wrote the words to the musical comedy The Shop Girl. He conducted the only interview ever given by Wilhelm Röntgen about his Röntgen rays (X-rays) in 1896. He also interviewed Guglielmo Marconi about his radio telegraph transmitter in 1897.

His work was published in McClure's Magazine, The Black Cat, and The Strand Magazine. He was also a playwright.

Dam traveled to London the cover the Jack the Ripper murders, and has been discussed as a possible author of some of the Jack the Ripper letters.

== Family ==
Dam was born in San Francisco and graduated from the University of California. He moved to London where he married stage actress Dorothy Dorr (1866–1940) on October 27, 1892. They had two children, Colby Dorr Dam and Losing Dam. The family returned to the U.S. in the early 20th century.

== Death and legacy ==
He died in of cancer in Havana, Cuba on April 26, 1906.

A heliograph image of him is at The American Vaudeville Museum Archive at the University of Arizona from his musical comedy The Shop Girl (1894).

== Work ==
=== Plays ===
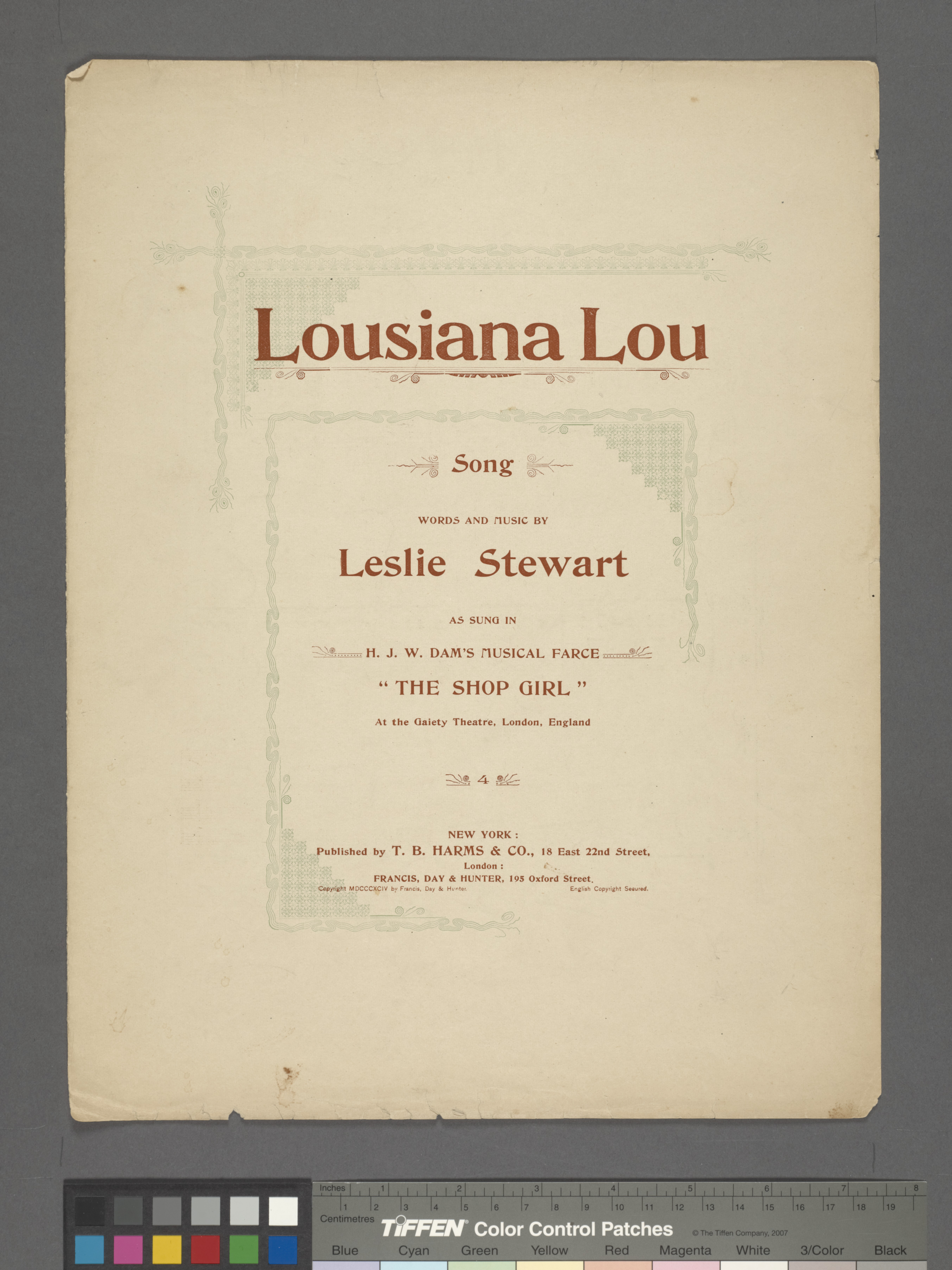
"Louisiana Lou" sheet music from The Shop Girl

- I want yer, ma honey : an Ethiopian oddity, with Fay Templeton
- Carmelita (1883)
- The Silver Shell, a play (1893)
- The Shop Girl : musical farce, music by Ivan Caryll
- The White Silk Dress, a play

=== Stories ===
- "Monsieur Bibi's Boom-Boom", The Strand Magazine (1900)
- "The Red Mouse"
- "The Transmogrification of Dan" in The Smart Set magazine (1901)

=== Articles ===
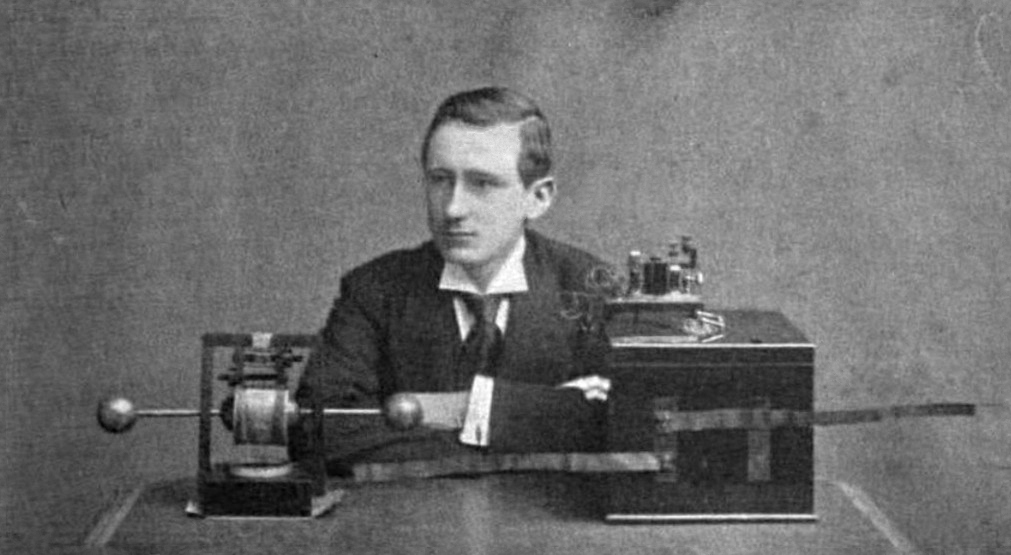
Guglielmo Marconi and his wireless apparatus in a photograph that accompanied Dam's article

- "The New Marvel in Photography, A Visit to Professor Röntgen at his laboratory in Würzburg. His own account of his great discovery. Interesting experiments with the cathode rays. Practical uses of the new photography", Article in McClure's Magazine about William Konrad Röntgen's work on X-rays, New York (Vol. VI, Nr. 5, April 1896)
- "The Terrible Vesuvius", Windsor Magazine (1898)
- The Mystery of Vesuvius (1898)
- "The New Telegraphy: An interview with Signor Marconi", The Strand Magazine, George Newnes, Ltd., London, Vol. 13, No. 75, March 1897
- "The tax on moustaches" The Strand Magazine, Newnes, London (1899)
- The Making of the Bible
- "Practical Penology", North American Review, May 1887, pages 514–523
- "A Morning with Bret Harte", December 1894 McClure's Magazine
