= Omar the Tentmaker (film) =

1922 film

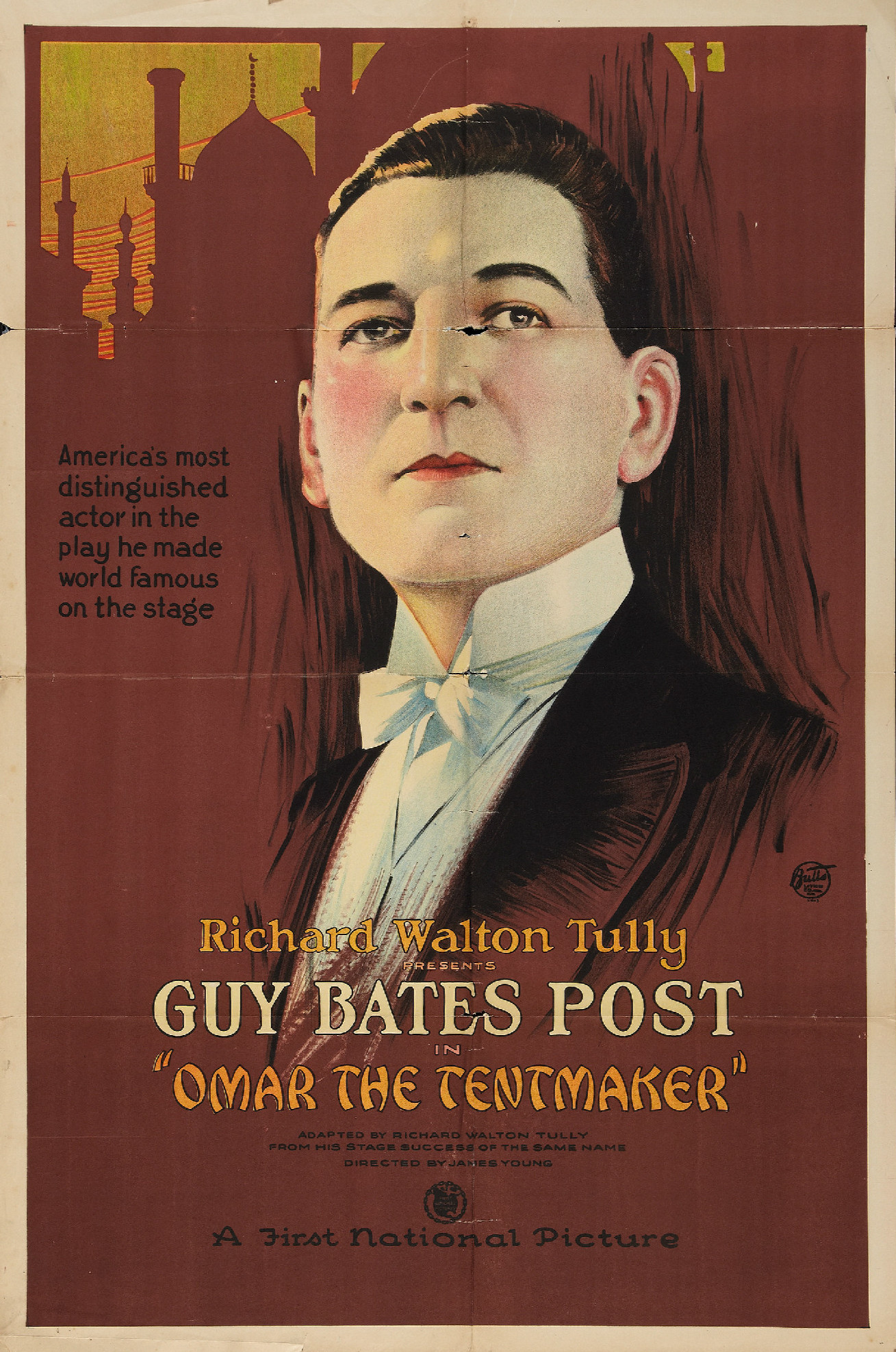
- theatrical release poster
- Directed by: James Young
- Written by: Richard Walton Tully (adaptation)
- Based on: Omar the Tentmaker (1914 play) by Richard Walton Tully
- Produced by: Richard Walton Tully
- Starring: Guy Bates Post; Virginia Browne Faire; Boris Karloff; Noah Beery; Patsy Ruth Miller
- Cinematography: Georges Benoît
- Production company: Richard Walton Tully Productions
- Distributed by: Associated First National Pictures
- Release date: December 4, 1922
- Running time: 80 minutes (8 reels; 8,090 feet)
- Country: United States
- Language: Silent (English intertitles)

Omar the Tentmaker is a 1922 American silent drama film directed by James Young and featuring Guy Bates Post, Nigel de Brulier, Virginia Brown Faire, Noah Beery Sr., Patsy Ruth Miller, and Boris Karloff. It was produced and adapted by Richard Walton Tully from his own 1914 Broadway play Omar the Tentmaker. The film's tagline was "Would You Know How Omar Loved? Would you sweep 1,000 years aside to find Shireen, the Persian Rose, who wed Omar and awoke in the harem of the Shah?" (Print Ad in the Albuquerque Herald, (Albuquerque NM)) 24 May 1923). The film is considered a lost film.

== Plot ==
Omar the Tentmaker becomes an outcast because of his radical writings and improved calendar (Omar wrote the Iranian first solar calendar circa A.D. 1073). Omar's wife Shireen, whom he secretly married and impregnated, is desired by the Shah, who has her brought to his harem. She repulses the Shah and is thrown into prison, where she gives birth to a daughter. The daughter Little Shireen is smuggled out of the prison and brought to Omar Khayyam, although he does not know the baby is his daughter.

Omar has been wandering about in a rage. He is arrested for harboring a Christian Crusader. When Omar is about to be tortured, his wife, who has finally escaped from prison, recognizes him and sends for the Grand Vizier, who is a former associate of Omar's. Omar is freed and finally finds happiness.

== Cast ==
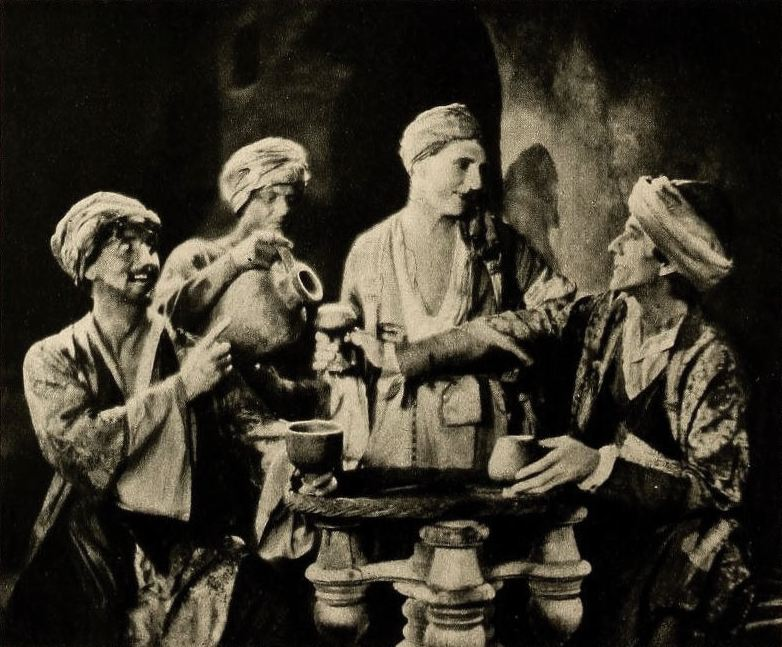
Douglas Gerrard, Guy Bates Post, and Nigel De Brulier

- Guy Bates Post as Omar the tentmaker
- Virginia Brown Faire as Shireen
- Patsy Ruth Miller as Little Shireen
- Nigel De Brulier as Nizam ul Mulk
- Noah Beery as The shah of shahs
- Rose Dione as Shah's mother
- Douglas Gerrard as Hassan
- John Gribner as Mahruss
- Will Jim Hatton as Little Mahruss
- Boris Karloff as Holy Imam Mowaffak
- Maurice Bennett Flynn as The Christian Crusader
- Edward Kimball as Omar's father
- Walter Long as the Executioner
- Evelyn Selbie as Zarah
- Gordon Mullen as emissary to the Shah
- George Regas as emissary to the Shah
- Nick Shaid as Arab guard in Shireen's garden
