= Bird of Paradise (1951 film) =

1951 drama film directed by Delmer Daves

- Theatrical release poster
- Directed by: Delmer Daves
- Screenplay by: Delmer Daves
- Based on: The Bird of Paradise; 1912 play by Richard Walton Tully
- Produced by: Delmer Daves
- Starring: Debra Paget; Louis Jourdan; Jeff Chandler
- Cinematography: Winton C. Hoch
- Edited by: James B. Clark
- Music by: Daniele Amfitheatrof
- Color process: Technicolor
- Production company: 20th Century Fox
- Distributed by: 20th Century Fox
- Release date: March 14, 1951
- Running time: 101 minutes
- Country: United States
- Language: English
- Box office: $1,650,000 (US rentals)

Bird of Paradise is a 1951 American Technicolor adventure drama and romance film produced and directed by Delmer Daves and starring Debra Paget, Louis Jourdan and Jeff Chandler. The screenplay was written by Daves based on a 1912 play by Richard Walton Tully. The film was distributed by Twentieth Century-Fox.

== Plot ==
Frenchman, Andre Laurence accompanies his college roommate Tenga home to Polynesia. While there, he marries Tenga's sister Kalua, and life is good until Andre falls under the disapproving glare of the witch doctor known as the Kahuna, who warns that Andre will poison paradise with his evil White ways. When the island's mountain erupts in endless lava flow, the Kahuna decrees that the volcano gods can be appeased only by human sacrifice, and the victim is intended to be Kalua.

The island's population gather to witness the sacrifice, except the infidel Andre, who is ordered to remain in his hut. As the villagers watch, Kalua climbs the peak and leaps feet-first into the hellish maelstrom. The mountain responds with a huge, satisfied belch and the island is saved. The next day, Andre returns to civilization.

== Cast ==
- Debra Paget as Kalua
- Louis Jourdan as Andre Lawrence
- Jeff Chandler as Tenga
- Everett Sloane as The Akua
- Maurice Schwartz as The Kahuna
- Jack Elam as The Trader
- Prince Leilani as Chief
- Otto Waldis as Skipper
- Alfred Zeisler as Van Hook

== Production ==
Twentieth Century-Fox announced the film in May 1950. Daves claims that he wrote "a practically new story" from the earlier play. The film reunited several personnel from Broken Arrow (1950), including Debra Paget, Jeff Chandler and Delmer Daves. Chandler joked that his character was just a variation on his performance as Cochise in Broken Arrow.

The story is really about a conflict of worlds in 1850: a primitive people who live by their beliefs and the civilization – in quotes – brought by the white man. The problem is never resolved; even marriage can't do it – but... we used some wonderful locations and the scenery is breathtakingly beautiful.

Sterling Hayden had been mentioned as a possibility for the male lead.

The film was shot on location in Hawaii beginning in August 1950. Chandler returned to Los Angeles every weekend to fulfill his radio commitment to Our Miss Brooks.

== Reception ==
New York Times film critic Bosley Crowther panned the film, writing: "There is certainly nothing original—or particularly blissful, we would say—about the romantic tumble here taken by a visiting white man for a beauteous native maid...Unfortunately, Delmer Daves, who directed and wrote the script, either didn't or wasn't permitted to pitch the whole film in this slyly kidding vein. And the consequence is a rambling mishmosh of South Sea romance and travesty, of solemn high-priesting and low clowning, of never-never spectacle and sport".

Reviewer William Brogdon of Variety wrote: "Richard Walton Tully's old legit piece, Bird of Paradise, makes another trip to the screen in a refurbished version. Previous filming of the play was in 1932 and, while Delmer Daves' version deviates from the Tully form, the essentials of the drama are still there, plus a beautiful Technicolor camera job, haunting island music and the use of actual locales...Paget hits a high level in her performance as the Princess Kalua. She, as well as the other players give their characters considerable sincerity. Jourdan is an excellent choice as the island visitor, as is Chandler as the prince."
