= Richard Walton Tully =

American playwright (1877–1945)

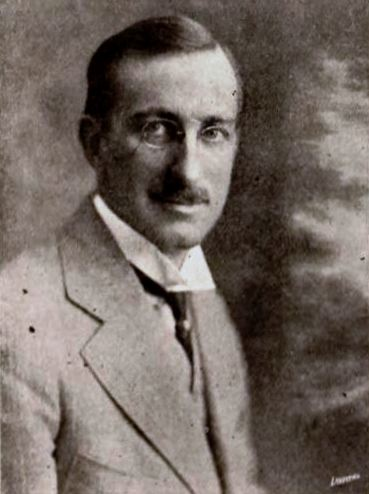
- From a 1921 magazine
- Born: May 7, 1877; Nevada City, California
- Died: February 1, 1945 (aged 67); New York City
- Education: University of California
- Occupation: Playwright
- Spouse: Eleanor Gates

Richard Walton Tully (May 7, 1877 – February 1, 1945) was an American playwright.

== Biography ==
Tully was born on May 7, 1877, in Nevada City, California. Tully was married to another playwright Eleanor Gates until he divorced her in 1914.

His best known work was the 1912 play The Bird of Paradise, which caused a long-running court case over alleged plagiarism. A schoolteacher named Grace Fender was initially successful in persuading the court that Tully's play was based on her play In Hawaii, however the case was reversed on appeal.

Tully retired to breed horses. He died on February 1, 1945, in New York City at the Columbia-Presbyterian Medical Center.

== Filmography ==
- Rose of the Rancho, directed by Cecil B. DeMille (1914, based on the play Rose of the Rancho)
- Omar the Tentmaker, directed by James Young (1922, based on the play Omar the Tentmaker)
- Bird of Paradise, directed by King Vidor (1932, based on the play The Bird of Paradise)
- Rose of the Rancho, directed by Marion Gering (1936, based on the play Rose of the Rancho)
- Bird of Paradise, directed by Delmer Daves (1951, based on the play The Bird of Paradise)

=== Screenwriter ===
- The Masquerader, directed by James Young (1922)
- Trilby, directed by James Young (1923)
- Flowing Gold, directed by Joseph De Grasse (1924)
