= The Masquerader (1922 film) =

1922 film by James Young

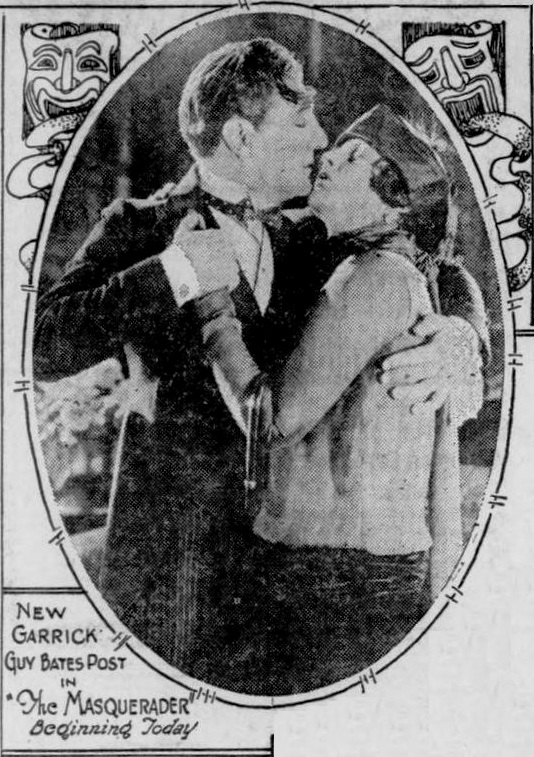
- Newspaper advertisement
- Directed by: James Young
- Written by: John Hunter Booth (play); Katherine Cecil Thurston (novel); Richard Walton Tully
- Starring: Guy Bates Post; Ruth Cummings; Edward Kimball
- Edited by: A. Carle Palm
- Production company: Richard Walton Tully Productions
- Distributed by: First National Pictures
- Release date: July 1922
- Running time: 80 minutes
- Country: United States
- Language: Silent (English intertitles)

The Masquerader is a 1922 American silent drama film directed by James Young and starring Guy Bates Post, Ruth Cummings, and Edward Kimball. A jaded British politician arranges for his place to be taken by his doppelganger cousin. The film was based on the 1904 novel The Masquerader by Katherine Cecil Thurston. It was remade in 1933 with Ronald Colman in the lead roles.

== Plot ==
With his excessive indulgences, a revered British statesman ruins his political career. In order to make a comeback, he employees his cousin, who looks very much like him, as a body-double to take over his life in order to rekindle his political career.

== Cast ==
- Guy Bates Post as John Chilcote M.P. / John Loder
- Ruth Cummings as Eve Chilcote
- Edward Kimball as Brock
- Herbert Standing as Herbert Fraide
- Lawson Butt as Mr. Lakely
- Marcia Manon as Lady Lillian Astrupp
- Barbara Tennant as Bobby Blessington

== Preservation ==
With no prints of The Masquerader located in any film archives, it is considered a lost film.

== Bibliography ==
- Goble, Alan. The Complete Index to Literary Sources in Film. Walter de Gruyter, 1999.
