= Flowing Gold (1924 film) =

1924 film

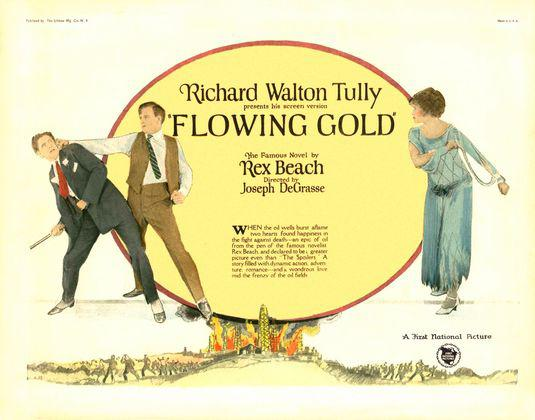
- Lobby card
- Directed by: Joseph De Grasse
- Written by: Richard Walton Tully
- Based on: Flowing Gold; 1921-22 serialized novel in Hearst's International by Rex Beach
- Produced by: Richard Walton Tully
- Starring: Anna Q. Nilsson; Milton Sills; Alice Calhoun
- Cinematography: Roy Carpenter; Gilbert Warrenton
- Edited by: LeRoy Stone
- Production company: Richard Walton Tully Productions
- Distributed by: First National Pictures
- Release date: March 1, 1924
- Running time: 80 minutes
- Country: United States
- Language: Silent (English intertitles)

Flowing Gold is a 1924 American silent drama film directed by Joseph De Grasse and starring Anna Q. Nilsson, Milton Sills, and Alice Calhoun. The film's plot concerns the Texas oil industry.

== Plot ==
Flowing Gold (1924)

As described in a film magazine review, ex-soldier Calvin Gray arrives in the Texas oil fields and meets the newly rich Briskow family. He soon becomes involved in a medley of adventures, including saving the Briscows from business ruin, rescuing the son Buddy from a foolish marriage, revenging himself on a perjured officer who had caused his dismissal from military service, and winning the love of Allegheny Briskow. When a downpour causes a flood with burning oil floating on the waters, and lightning hitting a gusher well, Allegheny is able to rescue her sweetheart.

== Cast ==
- Anna Q. Nilsson as Allegheny Briskow
- Milton Sills as Calvin Gray
- Alice Calhoun as Barbara Parker
- Crauford Kent as Henry Nelson
- John Roche as Buddy Briskow
- Cissy Fitzgerald as The Suicide Blonde
- Josephine Crowell as Ma Briskow
- Bert Woodruff as Pa Briskow
- Charles Sellon as Tom Parker

== Preservation ==
A print of Flowing Gold was discovered in the Czech Film Archive, and in 2020 the National Film Preservation Foundation issued a grant to the San Francisco Silent Film Festival for the restoration of the film.

== Bibliography ==
- John Woodrow Storey & Mary L. Kelley. Twentieth-Century Texas: A Social and Cultural History. University of North Texas Press, 2008. ISBN 978-1-574-41245-1
