= The Bird of Paradise (play) =

1912 melodrama

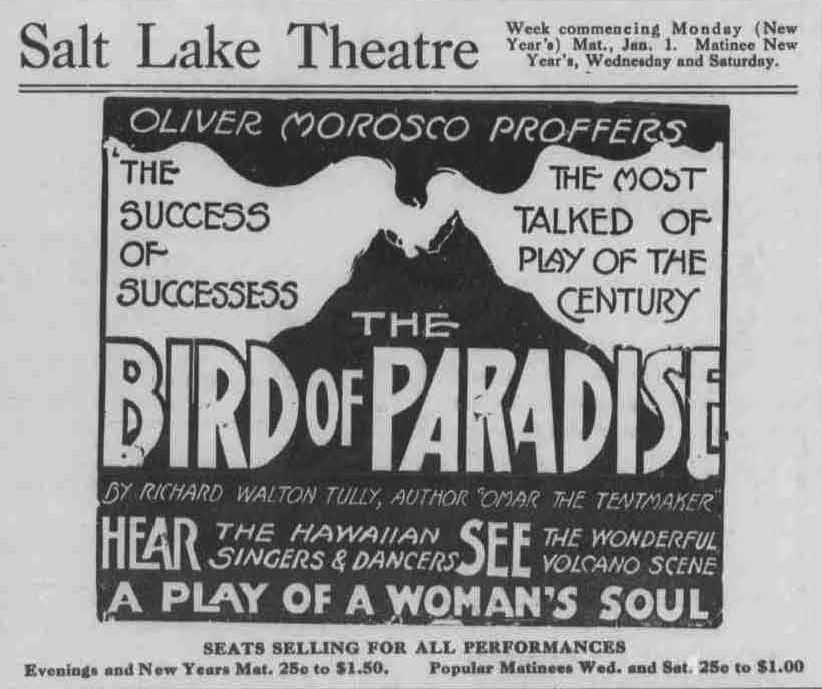
A notice for an Oliver Morosco production of The Bird of Paradise, 1916

The Bird of Paradise is a melodramatic American play of 1912 set in Hawaii, the best known work of Richard Walton Tully.

The play has been credited with creating an image of Hawaii as a land where native girls “dance the hula, play ukuleles, live in grass huts, and worship volcano gods”.

== Plot ==
Luana, a Hawaiian princess, is in love with a beachcomber who is also a doctor. He dies after saving the people of Hawaii by isolating the bacterium that causes leprosy. Luana then redeems his soul by sacrificing herself to the volcano goddess Pele to save her people again.

The play includes more-or-less authentic Hawaiian music, dancing, and a simulated volcano in the third act.

== Productions ==
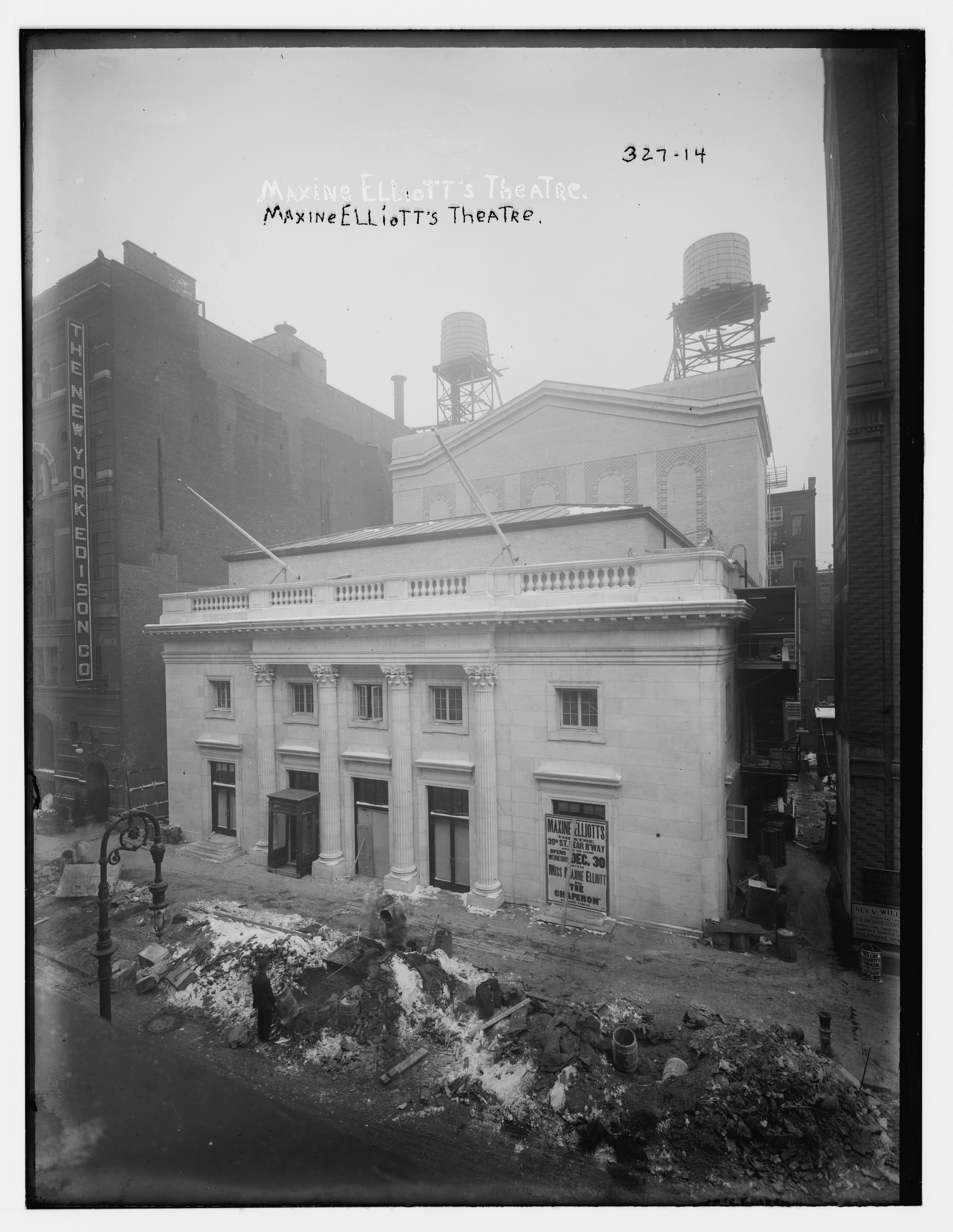
Maxine Elliott's Theatre

Even though New York City audiences found The Bird of Paradise ridiculous, it was a modest success on Broadway in 1912, running to 114 performances at Maxine Elliott's Theatre between January 22 and April 13, 1912.

However, its mixture of exotic and erotic was a big hit on tour, and with several revivals it ran off-Broadway for twelve years.

Clark Gable later said he had been inspired to become an actor by seeing the play at the age of seventeen.

== Plagiarism dispute ==
The play’s success led to a long-running court case, in which after twelve years a schoolteacher named Grace Fendler persuaded the New York Supreme Court that Tully had plagiarized her scenario entitled In Hawaii. The courts awarded her $780,000 in 1924. The legal fight then went on for another four years, and the judgement was reversed on appeal.

== Film adaptations ==
While the litigation continued, no Hollywood producer wanted to touch a film project based on the play, turning instead to other stories set in the Pacific islands. Finally, in 1932, Bird of Paradise was filmed, with Dolores del Rio as Luana and Joel McCrea as her lover. It was not a big success. The story was filmed again as Bird of Paradise (1951), with Debra Paget playing a central character renamed as Kalua.
