= Sarah Truax =

American actress (1873–1958)

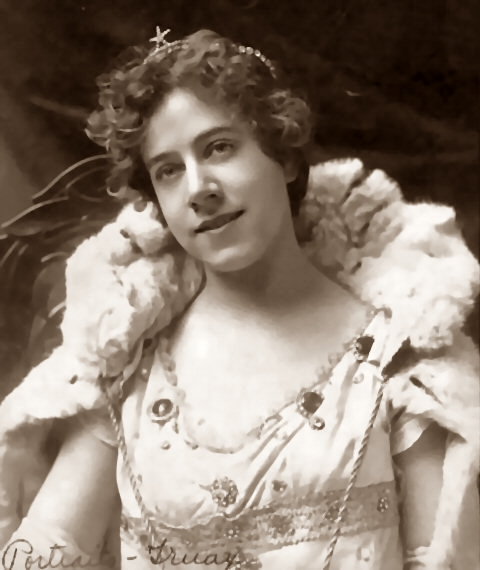
- The Merchant of Venice, c. 1895
- Born: February 12, 1873; Cincinnati, Ohio, U.S.
- Died: February 2, 1958 (aged 84); Seattle, Washington, U.S.
- Occupation: actress
- Years active: 1915–1919
- Spouse(s): Guy Bates Post (1897) Charles Albert (1908-1948) (his death, 1 child)

Sarah Truax (February 12, 1873 – May 2, 1958) was an American actress whose career began in the mid-1890s and lasted well into the twentieth century. Though she appeared in only a handful of Broadway and Hollywood productions over her career, Truax did achieve success throughout America as a star of stock and touring companies. She had starring roles in The Two Orphans, The Prince of India and The Garden of Allah. During her later years Truax remained active as an actor and stage director working with community theatres across her adopted state of Washington.

== Early life ==
Records differ on whether the daughter of David Truax and Emma Cornwall was born on the Cincinnati or Covington side of the Ohio River, but do agree that she was later raised in Chicago. Her father, who was born in Canada to American parents, supported his family as traveling salesman. Her mother was native of Ohio. In her youth Truax entertained at church and social gatherings and attended The Chicago Music Conservatory. Truax's original intent was for a career in music, but soon found acting a more accessible career path.

== Career ==
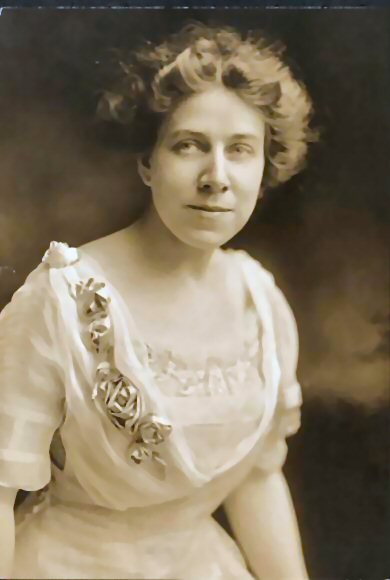

In September 1894, Truax made her professional stage debut with Otis Skinner's Chicago-based stock company playing Lady Castlemaine in Clyde Fitch's His Grace de Grammont. Over the following three seasons with Skinner she appeared as Portia in The Merchant of Venice, Pauline in The Lady of Lyons, the Queen and Ophelia in Hamlet, Elizabeth in Richard III, Lady Capulet in Romeo and Juliet, Lucretia Borgia in Otis Skinner's A Soldier of Fortune, and Catherine de Vaucelles in Charles M. Skinner's Villon, the Vagabond.

On April 18, 1897, at St. John's Episcopal Church, Truax married Guy Bates Post, at the time a fellow cast member with Skinner's company performing at San Francisco's Baldwin Theatre. That fall, the couple joined the Broadway Theatre Company's West Coast tour with Truax in the title rôle of Bronson Howard's dramatic comedy Young Mrs. Winthrop, and, that January, the principal character, Fifi Oritonski, in the troupe's production of William Gillette's comedy All the Comforts of Home. Later in January 1898, she played Marguerite Knowlton, the millionaire's daughter, in Henry de Mille's Lost Paradise. By April 1898 Truax was a member of the Great Northern Stock Company playing Virginia, the daughter of Frederick Warde's title rôle, Virginius, by Sheridan Knowles. Later in the year Truax was engaged as a leading lady at the Bastable Theatre, Syracuse, where that September she played Mercedes in Charles Fletcher's adaptation of Alexandre Dumas' The Count of Monte Cristo and, in April 1899, Mrs. Arbuthnot in Oscar Wilde's A Woman of No Importance.

For the 1899–1900 season, she joined the Lyceum Stock Company, Baltimore, as a lead player in productions of Dion Boucicault's The Jilt. Although the press had reported that Truax was expected to make her Broadway debut the following season, she instead was engaged as a lead actor for a season at Teck Theatre, in Buffalo, New York, and then in the same capacity over the following several seasons at Pittsburgh's Grand Opera House. Truax's tenure at the latter venue was highlighted by her portrayals of Lady Godiva in a play by that name written specifically for her by Joseph I. C. Clarke. In the fall of 1903, Truax embarked on a tour with the Hall Caine drama The Eternal City, in which she played Donna Roma Volonna to the David Rossi of Edward J. Morgan and Baron Bonelli of Frederic De Belleville. During a performance in Pittsburgh that May, Truax briefly stepped before the curtain to acknowledge the audience when it became evident their persistent calls for her were threatening to disrupt the show. Morgan felt that Truax had broken with theatrical tradition by speaking to the audience ahead the show's star and, as a result, she was eventually replaced by Janet Waldorf.

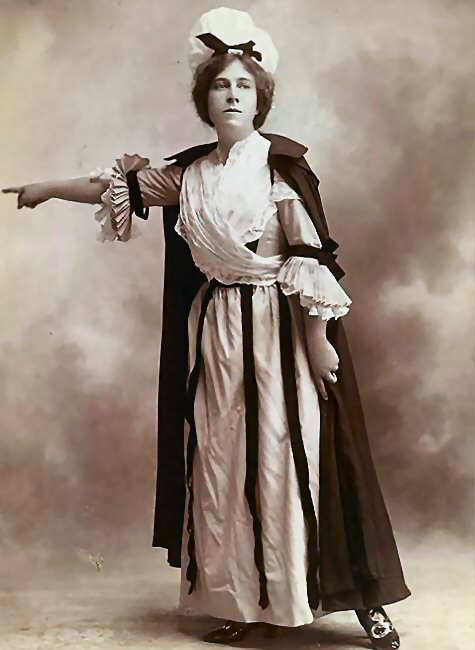
Portraying Henrietta in The Two Orphans, c. 1904

A year later, after The Two Orphans ended its Broadway run, Truax was chosen to replace Margaret Illington as Henrietta in the play's forthcoming national tour. In 1905, Truax toured in Hall Caine’s The Christian, playing Gloria Quayle, and on February 5, 1906, at Chicago's Colonial Theatre, she created the rôle Princess Irene in John I. C. Clarke's adaptation of the Lew Wallace historical novel The Prince of India. The play debuted at the Colonial Theatre, Chicago with John E. Dodson as the Prince of India, Julia Herne as Lael, daughter of Uel (adopted daughter of the Prince of India), William Farnum as Prince Mohammad and Gerald Lawrence as Count Corti. Truax had left the cast of The Prince of India by the time of its Broadway debut in September 1906, appearing that December instead at the old Bijou Theatre as Anna Hartmann in Mary Roberts Rinehart's drama The Double Life. Early the following month The Double Life closed after a legal issue arose between the playwright and the Bijou’s manager.

Aside for a brief two-night special engagement at the Garden Theatre with E. H. Sothern in Justin Huntly McCarthy's If I Were King (1904), Truax appeared in only four Broadway productions over her career. She was Lady Olivia in the modest success The Man Who Ate the Popomack, a dramatic comedy by Walter J. Turner that made its debut at the Cherry Lane Theatre on March 24, 1924. At the Princess Theatre during the 1924–25 season, she played Hattie Smith in Martha Stanley’s long-running drama My Son.

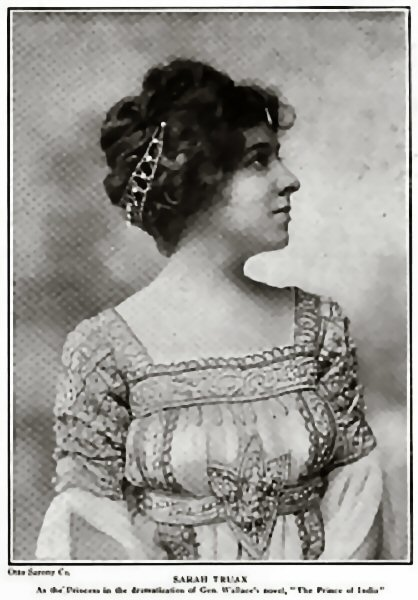
As Princess Irene in The Prince of India, c. 1906

At the beginning of the 1907–08 season, Truax toured as Claudia Deering, the lead character in John Hutchins’ drama The Spider's Web. She left the production in December after announcing her engagement to Charles S. Albert, a Minneapolis attorney. Truax and her former spouse had parted on relatively good terms the year before. Her marriage to Albert occurred on January 18, 1908, at a friend's home in Chicago and was followed by a near three-year hiatus from the stage.

Truax reappeared on November 6, 1911, for a six-week engagement at Boston's Majestic Theatre playing opposite Frank Campeau in Charles Klein's drama The Outsiders. She was next seen in San Francisco as the head of theatrical company that featured Thurlow Bergen as her leading man. Over a five or six week engagement at the city's Alcazar Theatre the two starred in productions of Mrs. Dane's Defence, Lady Windermere's Fan, Mother and The Nigger. At the Metropolitan Opera House on May 2 of the following year, Truax played the Spirit of Justice to Pauline Frederick's Spirit of Women and Lillian Nordica's Columbia, in a women's suffrage pageant production of The Dream of Freedom. On June 30, 1913, she began a six-week engagement at Pittsburgh's Grand Opera House performing the title rôle in Charles Hale Hoyt's farce-comedy A Contented Woman. Beginning that fall and on into the spring of 1914 she was Domini Enfilden to Lawson Butt's Boris Androvsky in road productions of The Garden of Allah, a play by Mary Anderson based on the book by Robert Smythe Hichens. Truax again played Domini in The Garden of Allah in an extended tour that began in the fall of 1916 and ended in March 1918 after closing out a near four-week run at Broadway's Manhattan Opera House. She later starred opposite William Faversham in a 1925 continental tour with Zoë Akins' drama, Footloose.

== Film ==
Truax appeared in at least two silent films: Jordan is a Hard Road (1915), in which she portrayed Lillian Gish's mother in a tale about a reformed thief adapted from the book and screenplay by Gilbert Parker, and Fool’s Gold (1919), a story by M. A. Miller that revolves around two gold miners and the women they love.

== Later life ==
In 1912, Truax, her husband and young daughter moved to Spokane, Washington, where Charles Albert served as counsel for the Great Northern Railway Company. She eventually became involved in local theatres in Spokane, Seattle, and a number of other cities and towns throughout the state. During this period Truax supported the Little Theatre Movement where she enjoyed nurturing young talent. In 1927, she and her husband relocated to Seattle where they would live out the remainder of their days. Truax's autobiography, A Woman of Parts: Memories of a Life on Stage, was released in 1949 by Longmans, Green and Co., New York.

Truax died in Seattle at the age of 84, one week shy of the tenth anniversary of the loss of her husband.

Their daughter, Drusilla Ruth Albert (1909–1990), became an artist and author. She had studied sculpture under the Italian Orlando Griselli and attended the Pennsylvania Academy of the Fine Arts. On Christmas Eve 1938, she married George Kidd, at the time an American foreign correspondent working for the United Press desk in Berlin, Germany. Together they wrote, How to Raise and Train an Irish Terrier, published in 1965 by T. F. H. Publications Incorporated.
