= John Hunter Booth =

American screenwriter

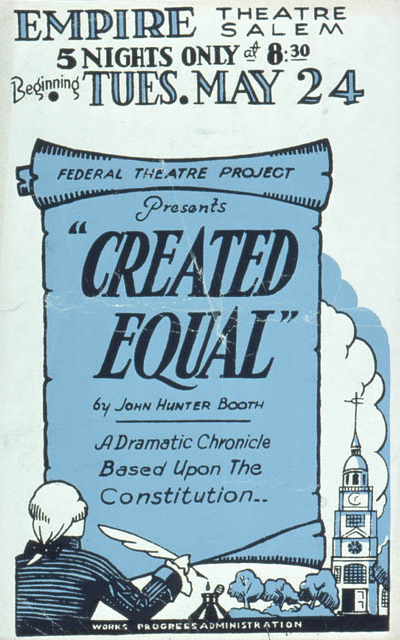
Poster for the Federal Theatre Project production of John Hunter Booth's Created Equal (1938)

John Hunter Booth (1886 – November 23, 1971) was an American playwright. He wrote multiple stage plays and films. He was born in New Orleans, Louisiana, United States and died in Norwood, Massachusetts.

== Works ==
- 4 Devils (Note: It was initially released on October 3, 1928 by Fox Film Corporation without dialogue, but it was pulled from distribution for sound to be added. Booth was hired to write the dialogue. The dialogue version was released on June 15, 1929.)
- A Man's Own Soul
- The Better Man
- Brass Buttons
- Created Equal
- Crescendo
- Evangeline (Note: Billed as a performer.)
- The Foot Of The Mountain
- Keep Her Smiling
- Like A King
- The Little Man
- The Lone Star Ranger
- The Masquerader (play)
- N A M E S
- The Native Son
- No Trespassing
- Omar the Tentmaker (play) (Note: Billed as a performer.)
- Princess April
- Rolling Home
- The Round Pegs
- The Silent Voice
- Strange Harmony
- Talk About Girls
- Tomorrow
- The Valiant
- We Are The Chosen
- When The Train Stopped
- When Wilderness Was West
- The Winged Messenger
- Wolves
- The Woman Of Destiny
- The Worshipers
