= Two Girls Wanted (play) =

1926 stage comedy by Gladys Unger

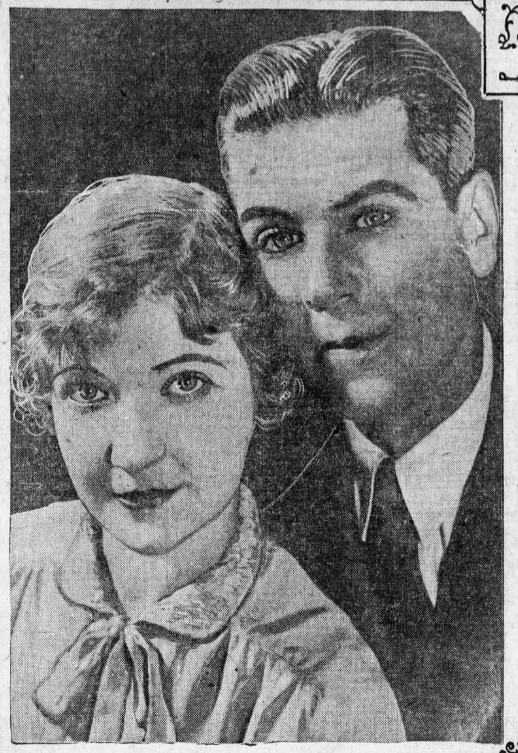
- Nydia Westman and Donald Foster
- Original language: English
- Written by: Gladys Unger
- Subject: Poor girl catches young businessman
- Genre: Comedy
- Setting: A Third Avenue rooming house, a Wall Street office, and an estate in Ardsley, New York

Premiere
- Date: September 9, 1926
- Place: Little Theatre
- Directed by: Winchell Smith

Two Girls Wanted, AKA Help Wanted-- Female, is a 1926 play written by Gladys Unger. It is a three-act comedy with six scenes, three settings, and twelve speaking characters. The action of the play spans five days time. The story concerns two sisters doing office work in Manhattan who find they can make more money as housemaids on a Westchester County estate.

It was first produced by John Golden, staged by Winchell Smith, with settings by Willy Pogany. It starred Nydia Westman. After three tryouts as Help Wanted-- Female during July 1926, the play was retitled Two Girls Wanted for its Broadway premiere, running from September 1926 through June 1927, for 328 performances.

The story was adapted for a 1927 silent film of the same name, now considered lost.

== Characters ==
Listed by order of appearance within their scope.

Lead

- Marianna Miller is 17, a short, pert and unflappable stenographer from New England.

Supporting

- Sarah Miller is Marianna's slightly older sister, a filing clerk with a talent for cooking.
- Miss Timoney is the longtime secretary to Philip Hancock, whom she secretly loves.
- Jack Terry is Philip Hancock's nephew and heir, who seeks to win Edna Delafield.
- Dexter Wright is the young sales manager of the Wonder Equipment Company.
- Philip Hancock is the middle-aged, gruff but kind, president of Hancock Equipment Company.

Featured

- Mrs. Gock is the fussy landlady for a Third Avenue rooming house.
- Mrs. Delafield is a society lady who feels acutely the shortage of servants.
- Edna Delafield is Mrs. Delafield's daughter, engaged to Dexter Wright.
- William Moody is president of Wonder Equipment Company, brother to Mrs. Delafield.
- Michael is a chauffeur.
- Johnny is an office boy at Hancock Equipment Company.

== Synopsis ==
Act I (Scene 1: The Millers' room at Mrs. Gock's. Evening.) Marianna and Sarah Miller earn $37 a week from office work at the Hancock Equipment Company. This covers their weekly rent with little left over. They prepare meals in a large trunk, which they close whenever Mrs. Gock comes into the room, as she forbids cooking. Marianna tells Sarah about Dexter Wright who has helped her. Seeking better work, they search the want ads and find a job offer for two girls, with better wages plus free room and board on a fashionable estate. (Curtain)

(Scene 2: The President's office of the Hancock Equipment Company. Next morning.) The efficient Miss Timoney unwittingly reveals her affection for the blustering boss Philip Hancock. Dexter is there trying to secure a higher price for Hancock's buyout of Wonder Equipment, because his boss William Moody has used the trust fund of Mrs. Delafield and Edna to stave off creditors. Dexter Wright tells Marianna he loves her, but Jack Terry reveals Dexter is engaged to Edna Delafield. Sarah, learning of Dexter's apparent perfidy, pushes Marianna to join her in taking the estate jobs. (Curtain)

Act II (Scene 1: The living room of Mrs. Delafield's estate. Two days later.) Sarah Miller has been hired as cook, while Marianna is the new parlor maid. Sarah is delighted with her new job, but Marianna is abashed when Dexter calls on his boss William Moody, who is visiting his sister, Mrs. Delafield. Philip Hancock arrives next, with Jack Terry and Mis Timoney, to negotiate the buyout. Philip wants a lower price, and so does Jack. He loves Edna and her mercenary heart, and reasons if her trust fund is depleted she'll turn from Dexter to him. (Curtain)

(Scene 2: Same as previous. That evening.) Dexter convinces Marianna that he does love her, but feels obligated to help Moody and the Delafields. Jack Terry is alarmed at Dexter's persuasive estimate of Wonder Equipment sales, and so decides to nobble him from further negotiations. Miss Timoney startles Philip Hancock by saying Dexter is right about the sales estimates. (Curtain)

Act III (Scene 1: Same as previous. 4am.) Jack Terry has slipped knockout drops to Dexter Wright, to make him appear incapacitated and prevent him from arguing for a higher buyout. Marianna rolls Dexter under the living room sofa to hide him, while she overhears Philip Hancock confess some personal and business secrets. (Curtain)

(Scene 2: Same as previous. 10am.) As the negotiation resumes, Marianna casually drops hints about Hancock's secrets, while Miss Timoney presents a real valuation for the Wonder Equipment buyout. She then threatens to quit if Philip Hancock doesn't accept the estimate. Hancock is alarmed; he knows she is largely responsible for his company's success, so to keep her on, he accepts the estimate and proposes marriage. Convinced of Dexter's sales talent, Hancock offers him a new sales manager's position in Chicago. Dexter will accept if Marianna will marry him, to which she replies that she'd love to live in Chicago. (Note: Her declaration amazed New York critic Carty Ranck, who said "Positively she is the first person we ever heard admit such a thing".) (Curtain)

== Original production ==
=== Background ===
Gladys Unger sold a play to John Golden called Maid Wanted in June 1926, which was said to be ready for immediate tryout. Winchell Smith would be staging it and likely tweaking the title and contents. A week later, it was reported the play would be called Help Wanted-- Female, and that it would star Nydia Westman and Wallace Ford, who had co-starred in Pigs two years before. The tryout locations and dates were announced, and the supporting cast listed.

=== Cast ===
Cast for the tryouts and during the original Broadway run. Production was on hiatus from July 25 through September 8, 1926.
Role	Actor	Dates	Notes and sources
Mariana Miller	Nydia Westman	Jul 15, 1926 - Jun 18, 1927	
Sarah Miller	Charlotte Denniston	Jul 15, 1926 - Jun 18, 1927	Denniston, from West Hartford, Connecticut, graduated from the American Academy of Dramatic Arts.
Miss Timoney	Mary Philips	Jul 15, 1926 - Jun 18, 1927	
Dexter Wright	Donald Foster	Jul 15, 1926 - Jul 24, 1927	Foster played in all three tryouts, but was replaced for the Broadway premiere.
Dexter Wright	William Hanley	Sep 09, 1926 - Dec 11, 1926	A lawyer turned actor, Hanley left for a flop called The Arabian Nightmare.
Dexter Wright	Donald Foster	Dec 13, 1926 - Jun 18, 1927	Foster resumed the role he originated when Hanley left.
Philip Hancock	Frank Monroe	Jul 15, 1926 - Jun 18, 1927	
Mrs. Gock	May Duryea	Jul 15, 1926 - Jun 18, 1927	
Mrs. Delafield	Beverly Sitgreaves	Jul 15, 1926 - Jun 18, 1927	
Edna Delafield	Grace Menken	Jul 15, 1926 - Mar 12, 1927	Menken was the sister of actress Helen Menken.
Edna Delafield	Una Merkel	Mar 14, 1927 - Apr 30, 1927	Took over for Menken when the latter was shifted to The Gossipy Sex, another John Golden production.
Edna Delafield	Neville Westman	May 02, 1927 - Jun 18, 1927	She was Nydia Westman's younger sister.
William Moody	Herbert Saunders	Jul 15, 1926 - Jun 18, 1927	
Jack Terry	Charles Laite	Jul 15, 1926 - Jun 18, 1927	
Michael	James C. Lane	Jul 15, 1926 - Jun 18, 1927	
Johnny	John Humphrey	Jul 15, 1926 - Jun 18, 1927	

=== Tryouts ===
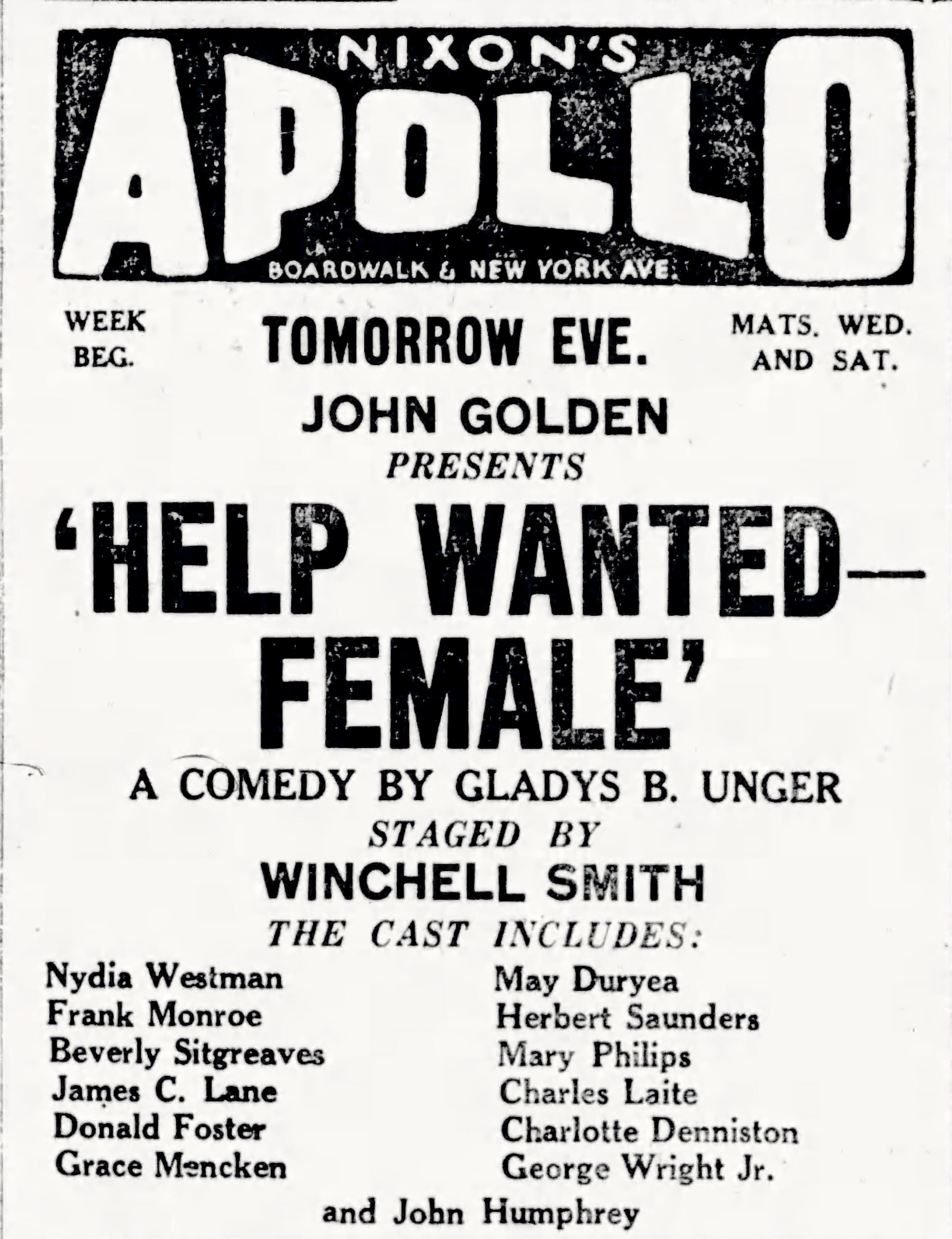

Under the title, Help Wanted-- Female, the play had its first tryout at the Mamaroneck Playhouse in Mamaroneck, New York on July 15, 1926. The local reviewer reported Broadway notables such as Ethel Barrymore, Helen Menken, Lee Shubert, J. J. Shubert, and Alice Brady were in attendance. They considered the first scene of Act I was too long, but the tempo and Nydia Westman improved with each new scene. Also singled out for praise was Mary Philips as Miss Timoney. Though Wallace Ford had been previously announced for the male lead, that role was taken by Donald Foster.

The production then played for two nights at the Stamford Playhouse in Stamford, Connecticut, starting July 16, 1926. Here the local critic agreed that Nydia Westman and Mary Philips were the most popular, with Westman being "as cute as anything" while Philips gave the more skilled and subtle performance.

Help Wanted-- Female finished up its tryout phase with a one week engagement at Nixon's Apollo Theatre in Atlantic City, New Jersey, starting July 19, 1926. Reviewer George R. Weintraub summed up the play as entertaining and amusing, "without being valuable or important". While praising Westman, Donald Foster, and Frank Monroe's Philip Hancock, Weintraub displayed most enthusiasm for Mary Philips, "a splendid performance".

A curious circumstance was the omission of any mention of actor George Wright, Jr in reviews or cast lists, even though his name was included in advertisements for all three tryouts.

=== Premiere and reception ===
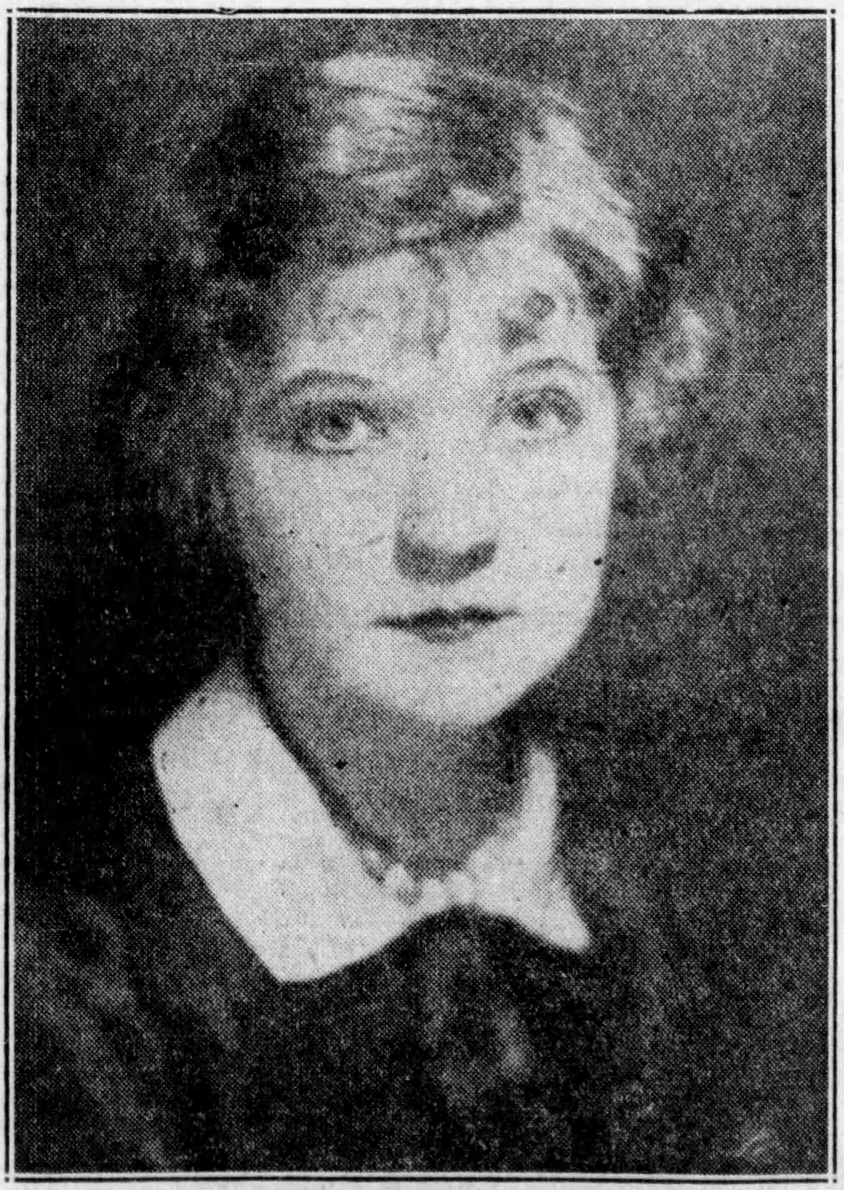
Nydia Westman

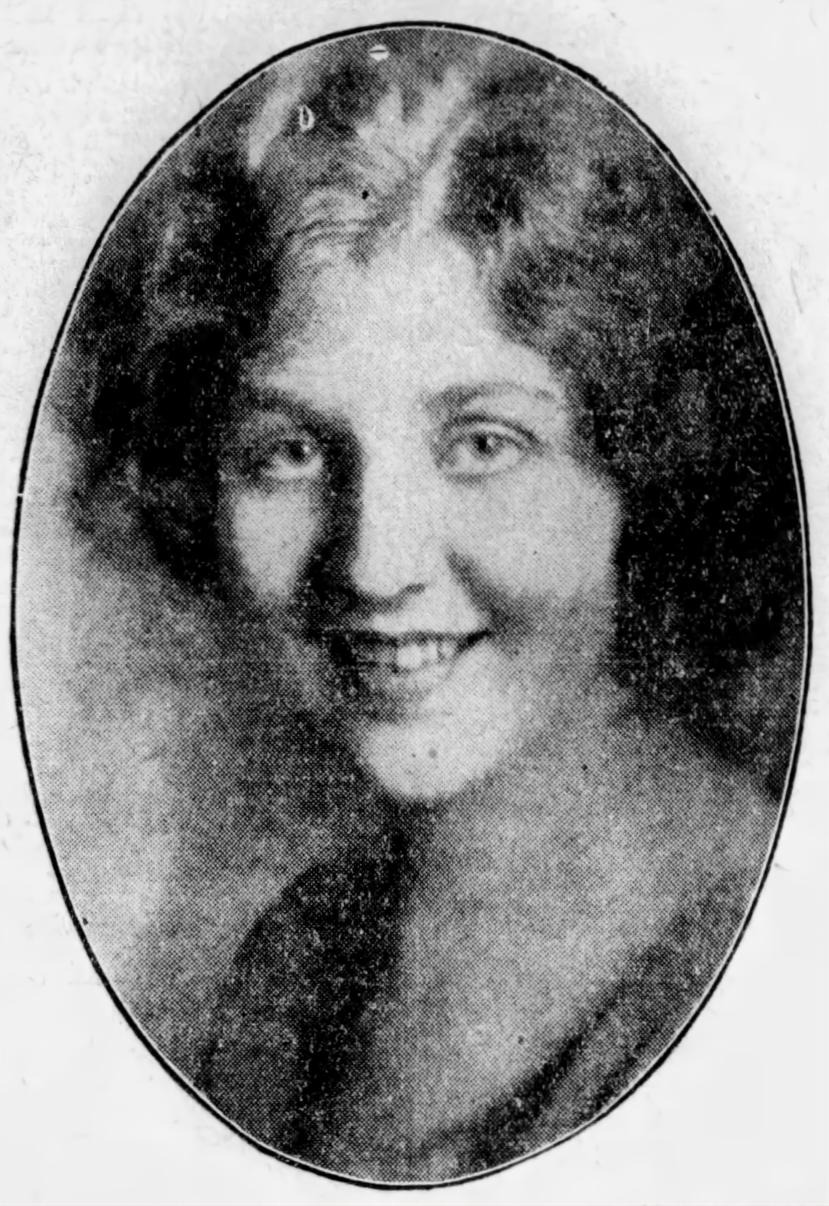
Charlotte Denniston

After the July tryouts, the production was on hiatus until September. In late August, Two Girls Wanted was announced as the new title, while it was reported to be the opening production for John Golden's new theater. However, construction delays at the new theater led to Golden switching the production to another venue, so Two Girls Wanted had its Broadway premiere at the Little Theatre on September 9, 1926. Carty Ranck in The Brooklyn Daily Times said it "contains at least the suggestion of a plot", and further "Nydia Westman makes up for all the play's shortcomings". He also praised the performances of Beverly Sitgreaves and Mary Philips.

Burns Mantle wrote that the work "is one of those plays that frequently puzzle the wise theatre folk of Broadway and go on making a lot of money for a long time". He also thought the performances of Nydia Westman and Mary Philips "well played". Brooks Atkinson likened the story to a fairy-tale with touches of melodrama, where "Vicious and virtuous alike remain thoroughly genial". Arthur Pollock in the Brooklyn Eagle summed it up: "Like most of the plays of Gladys Unger, this one straggles. Even the shrewd Winchell Smith has not been able to take the pauses, ineptitudes and hitches out of it. And yet it will find many thousands eager to like it."

=== Changes of venue ===
Two Girls Wanted closed on Saturday, October 30, 1926, at the Little Theatre, re-opening the following Monday, November 1, 1926, at the new John Golden Theatre. (Note: Located at 202 West 58th Street between Broadway and Seventh Avenue, it was designed by Harrison G. Wiseman and had a capacity of "nearly 900" people. It should not be confused with either the John Golden Theatre, or the Bernard B. Jacobs Theatre which bore that name from 1934 through 1936.) However, the stay there was short, for John Golden soon leased out his new venue to the Theatre Guild for a multi-year term. So after closing on Saturday, November 20, 1926, Two Girls Wanted moved back to the Little Theatre, re-opening there on Monday, November 22, 1926.

The production had one more Broadway move, closing May 28, 1927 at the Little Theatre, and re-opening May 30, 1927 at the Longacre Theatre.

=== Closing ===
The play closed on June 18, 1927, at the Longacre Theatre after 328 performances. (Note: This includes 326 performances as listed in the New York Daily News feature "The Golden Dozen", plus the matinee and evening performances scheduled for that day.)

== Adaptations ==
=== Radio ===
- WMSG (Note: This was a New York City station broadcasting at 213 Meters.) - Nydia Westman and Mary Philips performed live a scene from Act II of Two Girls Wanted on October 1, 1926 at 6pm.
- WRNY - The play Two Girls Wanted was broadcast at 11:15pm on November 8, 1926.

=== Film ===
- Two Girls Wanted (1927) Silent film was adapted from the Gladys Unger play. Directed by Alfred E. Green, and produced by William Fox, it starred Janet Gaynor. Considered a lost film nowadays, the 1927 review in The Moving Picture World said the play's action did not translate well to the screen and that despite Janet Gaynor's efforts, the film was below average.
