= Donald Foster (actor) =

American actor

- Foster in Hazel, ca. 1961
- Born: Henri Donald Foster; July 31, 1889
- Died: December 23, 1969 (aged 80); Hollywood, California, U.S.
- Occupation: Actor

Henri Donald Foster (July 31, 1889 – December 23, 1969) was an American actor who appeared in a number of television series during the 1950s and 1960s, including Perry Mason, The Addams Family, Bewitched, That Girl, and The Monkees. He played recurring character Herbert Johnson, the Baxters' dotty neighbor in the 1960s sitcom, Hazel. He also had bit parts in a few Hollywood films.

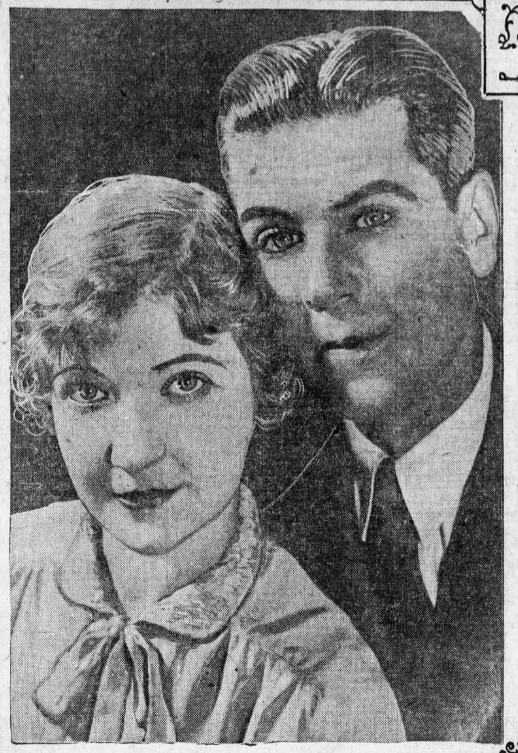
Foster and Nydia Westman in 1927

Foster's first acting experience was on a showboat on the Mississippi River. His Broadway debut came in The Country Cousin (1917). He had a leading role in the long-running Broadway hit Two Girls Wanted. His final Broadway performance was in The Ponder Heart (1956).

== Death ==
On December 23, 1969, Foster died at his home in Hollywood, California. He was 80 years old.

== Filmography ==
Year	Title	Role	Notes
1959	Al Capone	Commodore Stevens	Uncredited
1960	Please Don't Eat the Daisies	Justin Withers	Uncredited
1961	All in a Night's Work	Doctor	Uncredited
1966	Lord Love a Duck	Mr. Beverly	

== Television ==
Year	Title	Role	Notes
1967	The Monkees	Courtier	S1:E21, "The Prince and the Paupers"
1967	The Monkees	Vice President	S2:E2, "The Picture Frame"

|1968|| That Girl || Mr. Merral || S2:E19, "Sixty-Five on the Aisle" |}
