= Alexandra Carlisle =

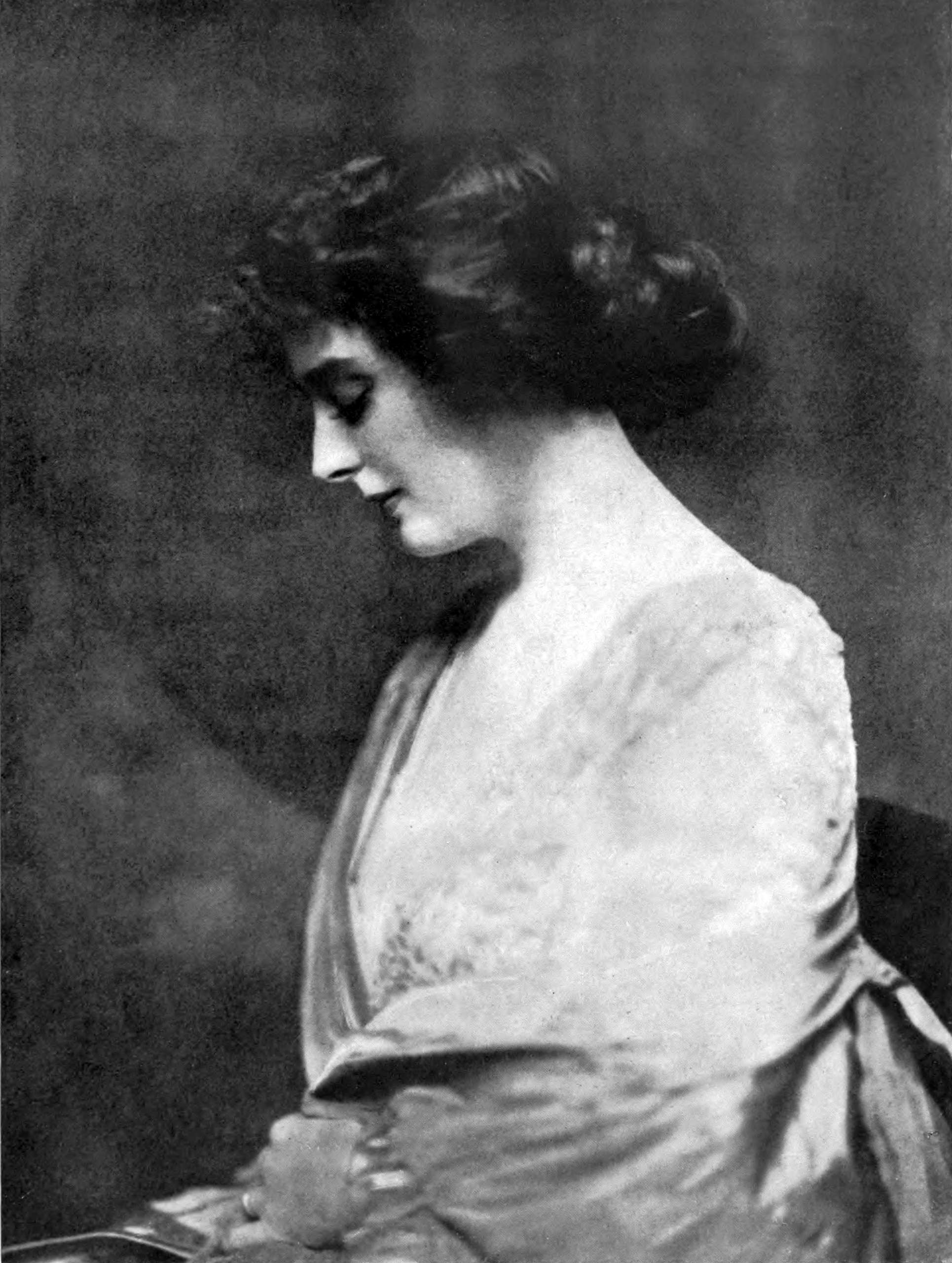
Alexandra Carlisle, portrait by Alfred Cheney Johnston (1922)

Alexandra Carlisle (born Alexandra Elizabeth Swift, 15 January 1886 – 21 April 1936) was an English actress and suffragist who settled in the United States. She was also known in the U.S. as Alexandra Carlisle Pfeiffer, adding the name of her third husband.

== Life ==
Born in 1886 at Hackney, Middlesex, Carlisle was the daughter of Henry Swift, a schoolmaster, and his wife Alexandra.

In 1903, she was Audrey in a stage production of As You Like It and Maria in Twelfth Night. In March 1907, she played the lead in Gladys Buchanan Unger's play Mr. Sheridan at the Garrick Theatre. In September 1908, at the Garrick Theatre, she played the title role in Hubert Henry Davies's play The Mollusc, with Joseph Coyne. Also in 1908, she appeared in two Shakespeare productions by Herbert Beerbohm Tree: as Olivia in Twelfth Night and as Portia in The Merchant of Venice.

In 1905, Carlisle had married Victor Herbert Miller at Maidenhead. In 1907, she petitioned for divorce, and in 1908 she married Joseph Coyne, her leading man in The Mollusc. This marriage also ended in divorce.

On 17 May 1911, Carlisle played the part of Georgina Vesey in a royal command performance of the play Money at the Theatre Royal, Drury Lane for King George V, and the Emperor and Empress of Germany.

In 1912, in Marylebone, London, Carlisle married Albert Pfeiffer, a dental surgeon from the U.S. from Bedford, Massachusetts. In 1914, Carlisle's mother died, and in 1915 she settled in the U.S., becoming a notable speaker for women's suffrage and for the Republican Party. By her third marriage, she had one daughter, Elizabeth Ann Pfeiffer. During 1917 she starred in The Country Cousin on Broadway.

In the Spring 1920, Carlisle directed the show Barnum Was Right for Harvard's Hasty Pudding Club. At the Republican National Convention of 1920, she was the main speaker for Massachusetts and seconded the nomination of Calvin Coolidge as the party's candidate for vice president. In 1926, Carlisle directed a production of The Tragedy of Nan at Chicago's Goodman Theatre that ran from 25 March to 10 April.

In 1923, Carlisle's third marriage was dissolved, and she then married J. Elliot Jenkins, an American engineer. In 1934, Jenkins committed suicide. As well as taking occasional film roles, Carlisle continued to work on Broadway, including playing the role of Lady Macduff in a production of Macbeth in October 1935. She died of a heart attack on 21 April 1936 in the Hotel Astor in New York City, and was buried in Shawsheen Cemetery.

== Filmography ==
- 1917: The Tides of Fate as Fanny Lawson
- 1934: Half a Sinner as Mrs. Mary Clarke
