= The Country Cousin (play) =

1917 play by Booth Tarkington and Julian Street

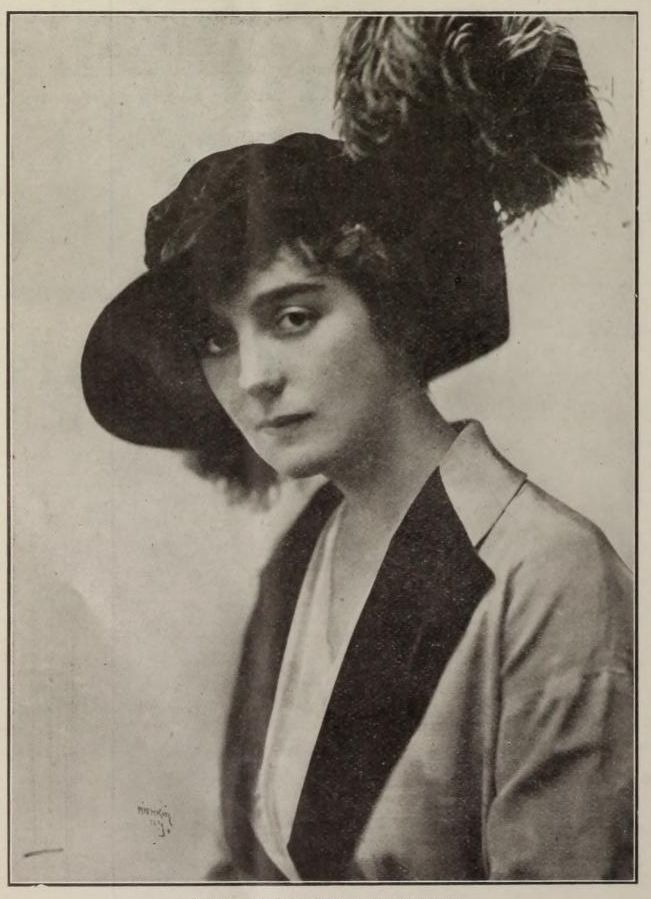
- Alexandra Carlisle 1915
- Original language: English
- Written by: Booth Tarkington and Julian Street
- Based on: The Ohio Lady by Booth Tarkington and Julian Street
- Subject: Family strife and a coming national crisis
- Genre: Comedy
- Setting: A Sitting Room in Centerville, Ohio, and a Seaside Villa on Long Island, New York, 1916

Premiere
- Date: September 3, 1917
- Place: Gaiety Theatre
- Directed by: Robert Milton

The Country Cousin is a 1917 play by Booth Tarkington and Julian Street, a revised version of their failed 1915 play The Ohio Lady. It is a four-act comedy that skirts melodrama, with three settings and thirteen characters. The action of the play takes place on a June 1916 morning, and during 24 hours in August 1916. The story concerns an intelligent young farmer, who saves her little cousin from being cheated while also causing a young man to realize there is a larger world that demands his participation.

The play was first produced by George C. Tyler with the backing of Klaw and Erlanger. It was staged by Robert Milton, and starred Alexandra Carlisle, with Eugene O'Brien and Marion Coakley. It had a tryout in Washington, D.C. during late August 1917, before it premiered on Broadway in September 1917. It ran through December 1917 for 129 performances, before going on tour.

The play was never revived on Broadway, but was adapted for a 1919 silent film.

== Characters ==
Characters are listed in order of appearance within their scope.

Lead

- Eleanor Howitt is 20, provincial and immature, an heiress to money from her late uncle. Her parents divorced when she was three.
- Nancy Price is 26, a college graduate, intelligent and resourceful, who runs a farm. She is a cousin to Eleanor.
- George Tewksberry Reynolds III is 28, an overly affected New York social celebrity, who belatedly grows up.

Supporting

- Mrs. Howitt is 45, a divorced, careworn mother to Eleanor. They live in a modest home in Centerville, Ohio.
- Stanley Howitt is 50, Eleanor's father, junior partner in a brokerage, who obliges the senior partner with his wife.
- Maud Howitt is 30, Stanley's very pretty second wife, an amoral conniver who lives in the moment.

Featured

- Sam Wilson is 19, a student at Ohio State; politically ambitious, condescending to women.
- Cyril Kinney is 22, stylish, but an empty suit, drinking himself to an early death like his father did.
- Jane Kinney is Cyril's fashionable mother, a cold, handsome woman who looks 30 but is far older.
- Athalie Wainwright is a cruel and attractive young woman, whom everyone talks with but secretly despises.
- Archie Gore is 50, athletic, wealthy, and violent; the senior partner who keeps Stanley around for access to Maud.
- Pruitt is a man-servant at the villa, who reports to Maud and Stanley Howitt.
- Blake is a messenger from Stromberg Jewelry, who brings the brooch to the villa.

== Synopsis ==
Act I (Mrs. Howitt's sitting room in Centerville, a June morning in 1916.) Mrs. Howitt is worried, her mood impacting her daughter Eleanor. Sam Williams bursts in, declaring his future prospects as senator or congressman, and insisting he'll need a wife to back him. Eleanor is unimpressed and Mrs. Howitt cautionary. When cousin Nancy arrives, Mrs. Howitt sends Eleanor and Sam on a fake errand. Mrs. Howitt asks Nancy to deal with Stanley, her ex-husband, who is in town and wants to drag Eleanor off to New York. Stanley had dissipated Mrs. Howitt's inheritance before their divorce; she is sure he has similar designs on his daughter's money. When the doorbell rings, Mrs. Howitt scampers away to hide, while Nancy admits George Reynolds, who drove Stanley from New York to Ohio. The two clash, for George is a terrible snob who barely acknowledges Ohio, while Nancy is a state booster. But Nancy persuades Mrs. Howitt to let Eleanor to see her father, and he convinces the girl to go with him to New York. (Curtain)

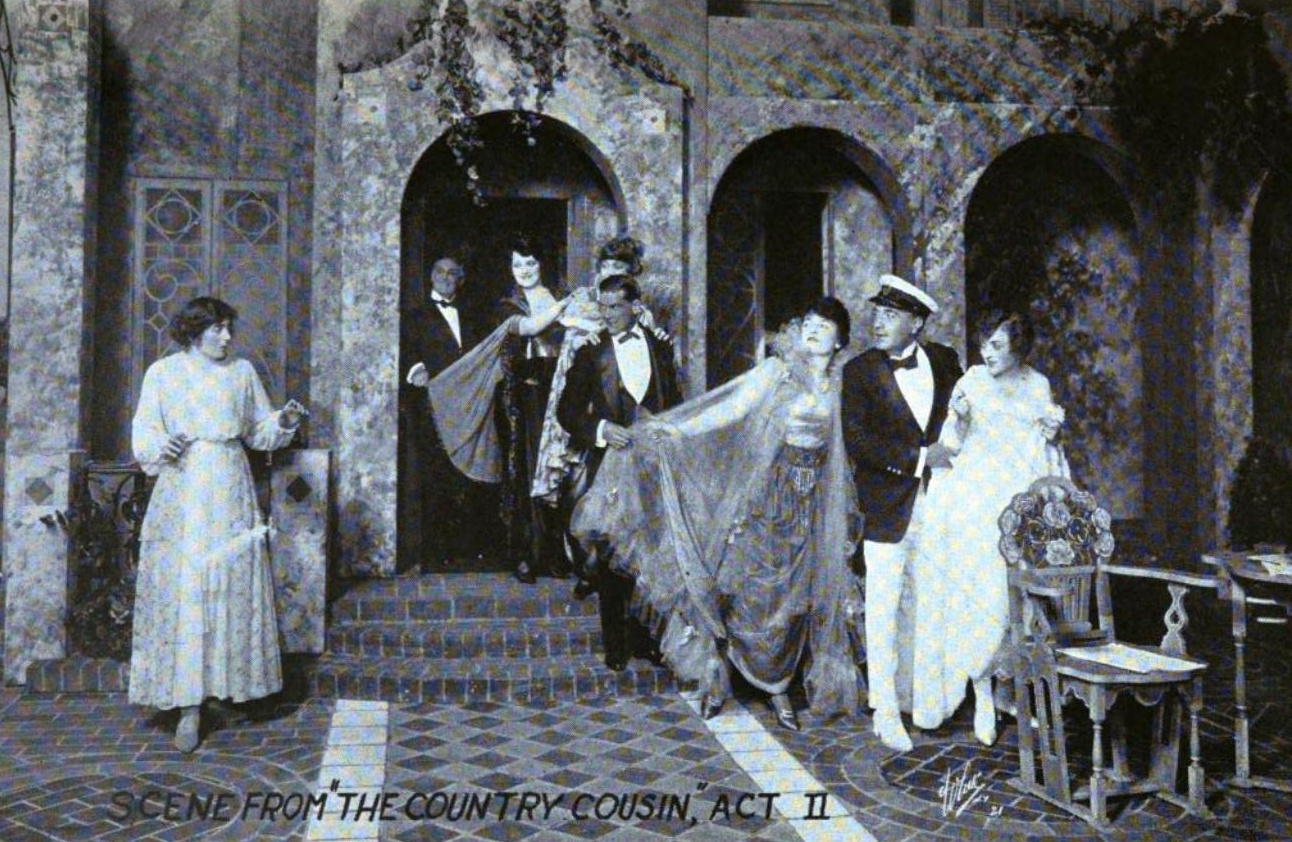

Act II (Terrace of Villa, an afternoon in August 1916.) Cyril Kinney dances with Eleanor to music from a gramophone, while Stanley Howitt, Jane Kinney, and Athalie Wainwright watch and converse by a low wall. Maud Howitt and Pruitt enter, bringing word of Nancy Price's arrival. Nancy is given veiled insults and excluded from conversations, but remains equable. When George arrives they spar lightly over wicker suitcases, surreys instead of motor cars, and pictures of Washington crossing the Delaware in Ohio homes. Nancy laughs at George's patronym, saying George Washington beats George III. When asked if she likes anyone in New York, Nancy mentions the Italian gardener, who discussed his family with her. But Maud whispers to Stanley that Nancy has questioned servants about their salaries and how many people are employed there. Maud excludes Nancy from going with the rest to Archie's yacht, and they all dance in a line as they exit the villa. Left behind, Nancy is mistaken for Maud Howitt by Blake when he brings the brooch. Eleanor had bought it for Maud, giving Stanley a signed blank check. Nancy learns from Blake that it cost $25,000, not the thousand Eleanor was told. Nancy keeps the brooch after giving Blake a receipt. She is then told by Pruitt that George will be eating dinner with her; he stayed behind to read in the library. (Note: This act, by the authors' own timing in the published play, runs twice as long (48 minutes) as any other.) (Curtain)

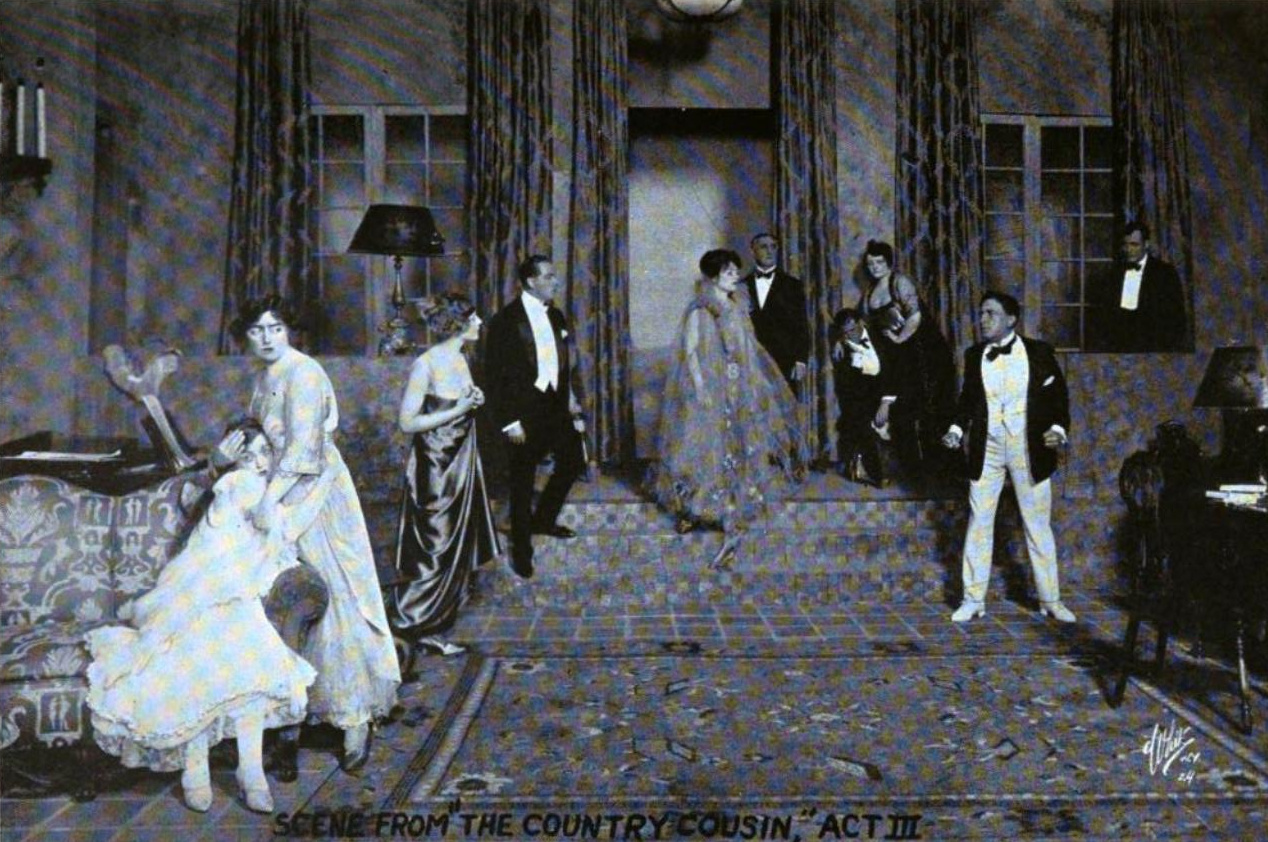

Act III (Interior of Villa, the same evening.) The yacht-goers straggle back to the villa. Cyril has flirted with Maud and received a blow from Archie, who loudly proclaims no one should touch his girl. Eleanor is woozy from champagne and the shock of realizing the blatant affair of her step-mother. Pruitt tells Stanley and Maud about the messenger, and they at once guess what has happened. After sending Eleanor to bed, they threaten Nancy with arrest, citing the case of Maud's former maid who stole a trifle. (Note: They are unaware that despite her provincial background and homemade dress, Nancy is a well-off property owner and not as easily browbeaten as a poor maid.) Stanley and Maud conspire to keep Nancy away from Eleanor for the remainder of the night. (Fast Curtain)

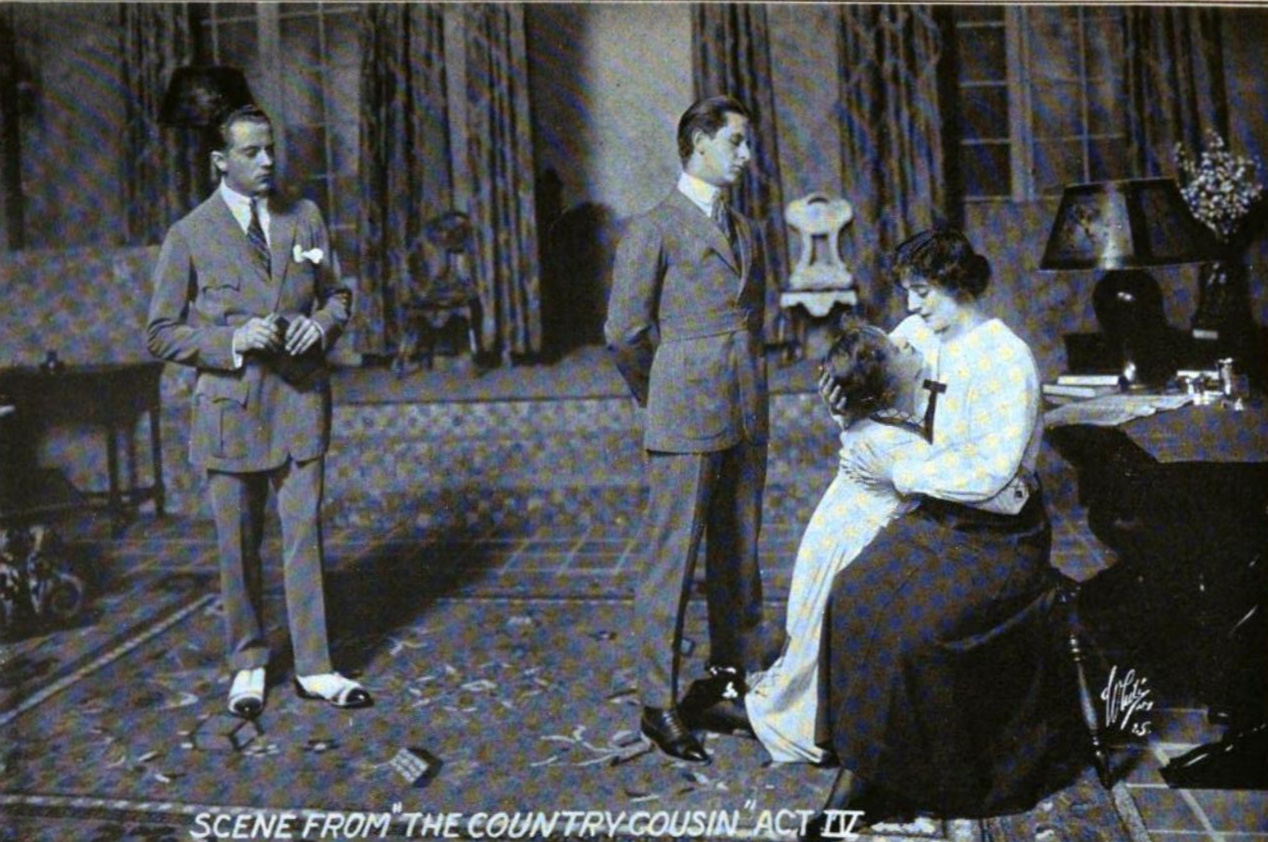

Act IV (Same as Act III, the next morning.) Stanley and Maud force Eleanor to confront Nancy over the brooch. They have spent the night coaching her what to say. Nancy slips the brooch to Eleanor, and defies the Howitts to do anything about it. The scheme backfires when George summons Sam Wilson from another room. The spell is broken for Eleanor, and she defies Stanley and Maud, saying she'll return home to Ohio with Sam. Eleanor begs Nancy's forgiveness; she has told Stanley and Maud they may keep the brooch and stay at the villa for a short time. George tells Nancy he's going to the training camp at Plattsburgh. He asks whether she might love him if he fights hard. She replies, "Everyone will!". (Curtain)

== Original production ==
=== Background ===
The published play was first copyright as The Ohio Lady, by Booth Tarkington in January 1916, followed by a joint copyright by Tarkington and Julian Street in March 1916. Not until 1917 was a revised joint copyright granted under The Country Cousin. Producer George C. Tyler said the play was commissioned from Tarkington and Street, to put a young American woman into the same position as the protagonist of The Man from Home, but it needed a lot of revision before it finally worked.

As The Ohio Lady, the play had a first tryout in Columbus, Ohio, on January 24, 1916. It starred Mary Nash as "Laura" Price, with Eugene O'Brien as George Reynolds. It then went to Chicago, opening at the Blackstone Theatre on February 7, 1916. It lasted there until March 4, 1916, when it was suddenly withdrawn. Percy Hammond, whose initial review had been doubtful of the play's quality, summed it up: "It failed, of course, not because it was a bad play, but because, in spite of first night enthusiasm, it was a bad show".

Over a year later, George S. Kaufman reported a new version of the play was announced as The Country Cousin. The national situation had changed with the entry of the United States into World War I on the Allied side. Though the play was set in 1916, the authors introduced foreshadowing of the coming conflict and concluded with the male lead going off to military training.

According to letters from Tarkington to Tyler, a number of actresses were considered by the authors for the leading part: Elsie Ferguson, Marjorie Rambeau, Emily Stevens, Grace George, and Janet Beecher. Matthew White, Jr. found it ironic that all these American leading ladies were bypassed in favor of the English-born Alexandra Carlisle.

=== Cast ===
Cast during the Washington, D. C. tryout and the Broadway run.
Role	Actor	Dates	Notes and sources
Eleanor Howitt	Marion Coakley	Aug 27, 1917 - Dec 22, 1917	
Nancy Price	Alexandra Carlisle	Aug 27, 1917 - Dec 22, 1917	
George Reynolds	Eugene O'Brien	Aug 27, 1917 - Dec 22, 1917	O'Brien was the only actor to perform in both The Ohio Lady and The Country Cousin.
Mrs. Howitt	Julia Stuart	Aug 27, 1917 - Dec 22, 1917	
Stanley Howitt	Arthur Forrest	Aug 27, 1917 - Dec 22, 1917	
Maud Howitt	Grace Elliston	Aug 27, 1917 - Dec 22, 1917	
Sam Wilson	Donald Gallaher	Aug 27, 1917 - Dec 22, 1917	
Cyril Kinney	Donald Foster	Aug 27, 1917 - Dec 22, 1917	
Jane Kinney	Eleanor Gordon	Aug 27, 1917 - Dec 22, 1917	
Athalie Wainwright	Louise Prussing	Aug 27, 1917 - Dec 22, 1917	
Archie Gore	Charles Mackay	Aug 27, 1917 - Dec 22, 1917	
Pruitt	George Wright, Jr.	Aug 27, 1917 - Dec 22, 1917	
Blake	Albert Tavernier	Aug 27, 1917 - Dec 22, 1917	

=== Tryout ===
The Country Cousin had its opening at the National Theatre in Washington, D.C. on August 27, 1917. The reviewer for The Washington Post said the play would not please critics but would appeal to audiences. They called it "a new Man from Home", but suggested it was a much better play. The acting of Alexandra Carlisle was praised for submerging her nationality into a Midwestern American. The Washington Herald critic noted that President Wilson and his wife were in attendance, and predicted a long run in New York based on the audience's reaction to Carlisle's performance and the play's depiction of American life.

=== Broadway premiere and reception ===
The Broadway premiere for The Country Cousin came on September 3, 1917, at the Gaiety Theatre. Theodore Roosevelt was present in a box as a guest of Julian Street, and was forced to make a speech in response to a "tremendous ovation". He called The Country Cousin "a first-class American play", a sentiment with which the Brooklyn Daily Eagle critic agreed. They liked the acting of Carlisle, Eugene O'Brien, and Donald Gallaher, but thought Arthur Forrest as the conniving father was "hopelessly out of the picture".

Other New York critics were not as enthused. Ralph Block said "As comedy in spots it is fair enough. When it arrives at melodrama, it isn't merely theatrical, it is hackneyed". He liked the acting of Carlisle and Gallaher, but decried the authors' outlandish picture of Eastern debauchery and trumpeting of Midwestern superiority. The New York Times reviewer was also incensed about the play pitting region against region, and the unrelieved depravity of Eastern manners and morals. After seeing this "one understands only too well the desire of the Germans to exterminate us".

Within a few days of the premiere, newspaper ads for The Country Cousin incorporated laudatory quotes from both President Wilson and Roosevelt. From the premiere through November 16, 1917, Alexandra Carlisle was the only performer listed in ads, with her name below the title and in smaller font. Beginning November 17, however, she received top billing. This marked the end of the 11th week of performances, and the announcement of her promotion to stardom by the producers.

=== Broadway closing ===
The Country Cousin closed at the Gaiety Theatre on December 22, 1917, after a run of sixteen weeks and 129 performances. (Note: There were eight performances per week (six evening shows and two matinees) with one extra matinee on Thanksgiving Day.) The cast was given a few weeks holiday before opening their tour in Brooklyn's Montauk Theater on January 14, 1918. Actor Eugene O'Brien had left the cast, and at the recommendation of Alexandra Carlisle, had been replaced by a young unknown actor named Alfred Lunt.

== Adaptations ==
=== Film ===
- The Country Cousin (1919)

== Bibliography ==
- Booth Tarkington and Julian Street. The Country Cousin: A Comedy in Four Acts. Samuel French, 1921.
- George C. Tyler and J. C. Furnas. Whatever Goes Up. Bobbs Merrill, 1934.
