= Beverley Sitgreaves =

American stage actress (1863–1943)

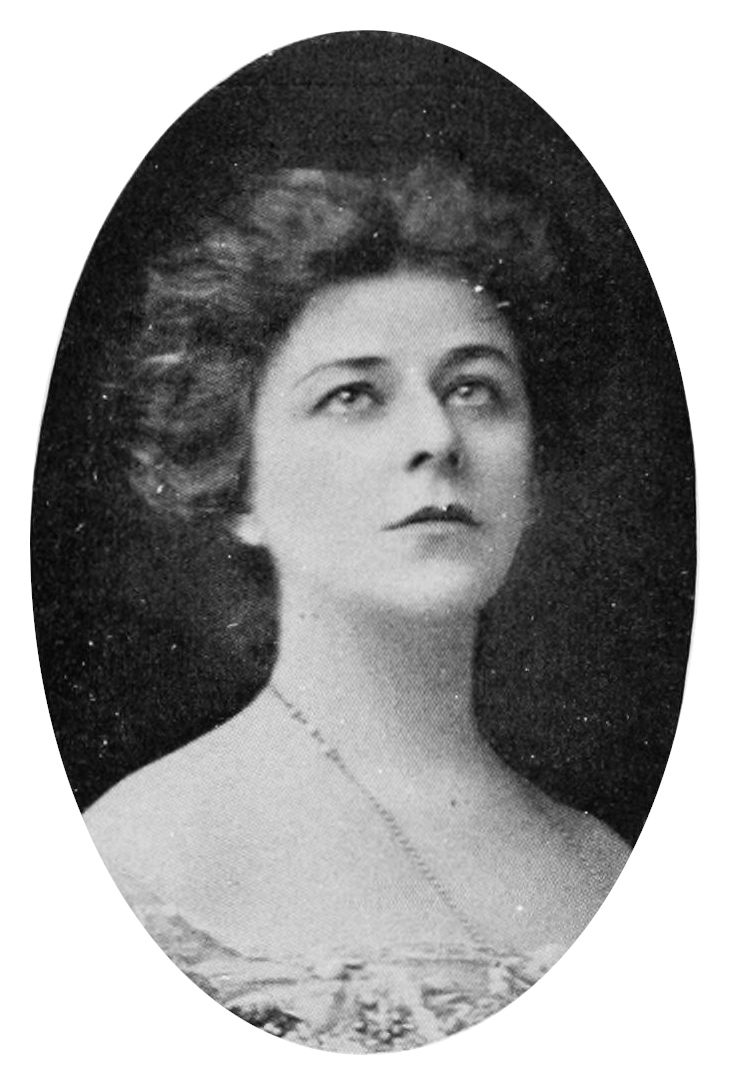
- Sitgreaves in 1909
- Born: Susan Beverly Sitgreaves; April 3, 1863; Charleston, South Carolina, U.S.
- Died: July 14, 1943 (aged 80); New York City, U.S.
- Other name: Beverly Sitgreaves
- Occupation: Actress
- Years active: 1890–1926

Beverley Sitgreaves (born Susan Beverly Sitgreaves; April 17, 1863 – July 14, 1943) was an American stage actress and philanthropist whose theatre career spanned some 50 years.

== Early life ==
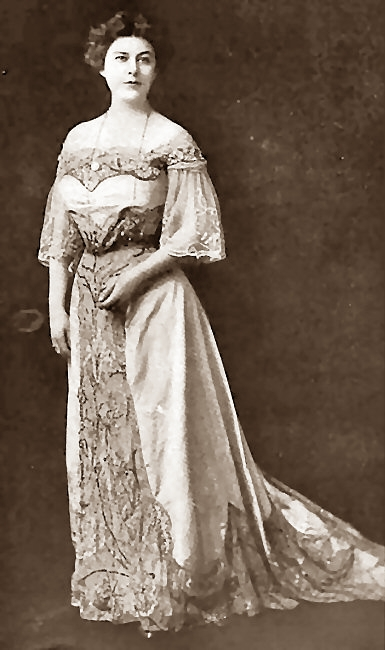
Beverly Sitgreaves in The Greater Love The Bohemian, January, 1906

Susan Beverly Sitgreaves was born in Charleston, South Carolina, on April 17, 1863, the eldest of six children raised by Julius A. and Eliza B. Sitgreaves. Her father, a native of South Carolina, worked as a copyist, and had married her mother, a Virginian, in 1862. Julius Sitgreaves was one of two men, the other, South Carolinian newspaper editor Edmund Ruffin, credited with firing the first shot in the American Civil War at the onset of the battle for Fort Sumter. At the time of his death in 1912, Julius was an editorial writer for the publication American Art News in New York City. Beverly received her early education at Mount de Chantal Academy near Wheeling, West Virginia, not far from where she and her family had settled after the war.

== Broadway actress ==
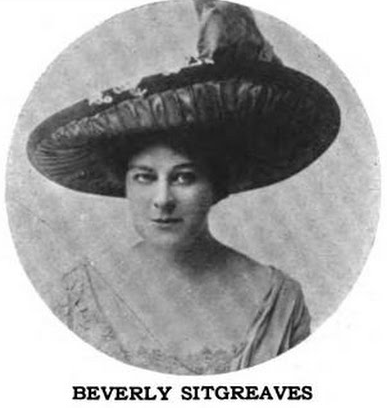
Beverley Sitgreaves, from a 1916 publication.

Mansfield's Beau Brummel was staged at the Madison Square Theatre in May 1890, a play in four acts subdivided into six scenes. The plot held little intrigue for audiences which crowded the venue dressed fashionably. Sitgreaves was complimented by a critic for her presentation of a woman who dresses stylishly.

In March 1900 she was in A Broken Halo, a play produced by the Globe Theatre in London, England. Earlier she acted in the company of Sarah Bernhardt in Paris, France. The troupe performed at the Renaissance Theatre in July 1897.

Sitgreaves was to have been the leading lady in The First Visit, an English version of Une Visite de Noces, by Alexandre Dumas, fils. However the English Censor of Plays prevented the Garrick Theatre from producing the play in June 1901. During January 1904, Sitgreaves took over the role of Mrs. Vidal for Raffles, the Amateur Cracksman, then playing on Broadway.

The Heir to the Hoorah was presented for the 100th consecutive time in July 1905, with Sitgreaves acting the part of Kate Brandon. The Hudson Theatre on Broadway, 141 West 44th Street, staged the play. In September 1905 the Princess Theatre was managed by Lee Shubert, Samuel S. Shubert, and Jacob J. Shubert. Located on 39th Street near 6th Avenue, the theatre staged Zira by Hartley Manners and Henry Miller, the stage manager. Margaret Anglin acted the leading part with Sitgreaves among the supporting cast.

Sitgreaves and Bernhardt were both patrons of the new French Theatre which was planned for the Broadway (Manhattan) and Times Square area. It was designed to seat 300 people and had an opening date scheduled for November 1, 1913, the first day of the theatrical season. Aside from Sitgreaves all members of the theatre company were from the Paris Conservatoire. Bernhardt was playing in New York at the time and sent a letter to Sitgreaves expressing support when she was solicited for assistance.

$2,000 a Night, written by Leo Ditrichstein, Frederic Hatton, and Fannie Hatton, was Ditrichstein's first effort when he was managed by Cohan & Harris. As an actor, he was supported by Sitgreaves, Virginia Fox Brooks, and Isabel Irving. The theatrical opened in Syracuse, New York, and moved to New York City later.

The New York Play Actors took over the Adolph Phillip Theatre in the autumn of 1914. It was remodeled and redecorated before it was renamed the Bandbox Theatre. The Bandbox was located at 37 West Fordham Road, (west of Davidson Avenue) in the Bronx, New York. It reopened on December 24, 1924, with a production of the comedy Poor Little Thing, by Jules Le Maitre. It was translated from the French original by Jerome K. Jerome. Sitgreaves was among the stage players along with Janet Dunbar and William Raymond.

Two Girls Wanted by Gladys Unger was originally titled Help Wanted-Female. Sitgreaves had a featured role in this comedy, which ran for 328 performances on Broadway during the 1926-1927 season. (Note: This includes 326 performances as listed in the New York Daily News feature "The Golden Dozen", plus the matinee and evening performances scheduled for that day.)

== Philanthropist ==
Sitgreaves participated in a benefit at the Waldorf-Astoria to raise money for an annex of the Loomis Sanitorium for Consumptives at Liberty (village), New York. She entertained by giving impersonations of Bernhardt and Eleanor Duse. She made an appearance for the British War Relief Society at the Lyceum Theatre (New York) in November 1914. She was featured in the melodrama, Gruesome Grange, together with Anthony Hope and Frank Kemble Cooper. In February 1923 she provided impersonations of Duse and Bernhardt in a benefit called a vaudeville soiree de gala at the Booth Theatre. It assisted the Girls Service Club at 138 East Nineteenth Street in New York City. Sitgreaves did Duse from Francesca di Rimini and Bernhardt's To be, or not to be from Hamlet. The Institute of the Woman's Theatre gave a benefit performance at the Klaw Theatre, 251 West 45th Street, New York City, on October 31, 1926. Sitgreaves contributed to the event which was organized by Florence Reed, star of The Shanghai Gesture.

== Death ==
Sitgreaves died at her New York City residence on July 14, 1943.
