= Music Is Magic =

1935 film

- Directed by: George Marshall
- Written by: Play: Jesse Lasky Jr. Gladys Unger; Screenplay: Lou Breslow; Edward Eliscu
- Produced by: John Stone
- Starring: Alice Faye; Bebe Daniels
- Cinematography: L. William O'Connell
- Edited by: Alex Troffey
- Music by: Oscar Levant
- Production company: Fox Film Corporation
- Distributed by: 20th Century-Fox
- Release date: November 1, 1935
- Running time: 66 minutes
- Country: United States
- Language: English

Music Is Magic is a 1935 American musical film directed by George Marshall and starring Alice Faye and Bebe Daniels. It is based on a play by Jesse Lasky Jr. and Gladys Unger. The film was Daniels' last American screen appearance.

== Plot ==
Diane De Valle is an aging theatre actress who can't deal with getting older. Trying to hide it, she has to come to terms she is being replaced by a younger actress. She has to defeat the much younger Peggy Harper for a role of a young woman in an upcoming stage production.

== Cast ==
- Alice Faye – Peggy Harper
- Bebe Daniels – Diane De Valle
- Ray Walker – Jack Lambert
- Frank Mitchell – Peanuts Harper
- Jack Durant – Eddie Harper
- Rosina Lawrence – Shirley De Valle
- Thomas Beck – Tony Bennett
- Hattie McDaniel – Amanda
- Arline Judge – Theatre Customer (uncredited)

== Soundtrack ==
- Honey Chile
  - by Oscar Levant and Sydney Clare
  - Sung by Alice Faye
- Love is Smiling at Me
  - by Oscar Levant and Sydney Clare
  - Sung by Alice Faye
- Music Is Magic
  - by Arthur Johnston and Sydney Clare
  - Sung by Alice Faye
- La Locumba
  - by Raoul Julien and Sydney Clare
  - Sung by Alice Faye

== Reception ==
In their December, 1935 edition, Modern Screen gave the film a one-star review saying "the results are not so good." Although not mentioning the star, Alice Faye, the reviewer commented on some of the other cast members, saying Ray Walker "does a good job", Frank Mitchell and Jack Durant "do some of their noisy cutting up", Luis Alberni provides "the real laughs" and Bebe Daniels’ "deft impersonation (of a movie star who has seen better days) should cause many a lady about town to wince."
