= Kate Williamson =

American actress (1931-2013)

- Born: Robina Jane Sparks; September 19, 1931; Ellenville, New York, U.S.
- Died: December 6, 2013 (aged 82); Encino, California, U.S.
- Occupation: Actress
- Years active: 1977–2003
- Spouse: Al Ruscio (1954–2013; his death)
- Children: 4
- Mother: Nydia Westman

Robina Jane Sparks, also known as Kate Williamson (September 19, 1931 – December 6, 2013) was an American actress, whose career spanned nearly three decades.

== Biography ==
Williamson was born as Robina Jane Sparks in 1931, the daughter of actress/singer Nydia Westman and writer/producer Salathiel Robert Sparks, sometimes called Robert S. Sparks. She began her acting career in 1977. Most of Williamson's credits were television appearances. She was best known for her roles on Ellen (1995), Disclosure (1994), and Dahmer (2002).

== Personal life ==
She married character actor Al Ruscio in June 1954, and was known to her loved ones as "Jane Kate Ruscio". The couple had four children and remained together until Ruscio's death in November 2013. Less than one month later, Williamson died following a prolonged illness on December 6, 2013, aged 82, in Encino, Los Angeles, California. She was survived by her four children and five grandchildren.
