= Marion Coakley =

American actress (1899–1968)

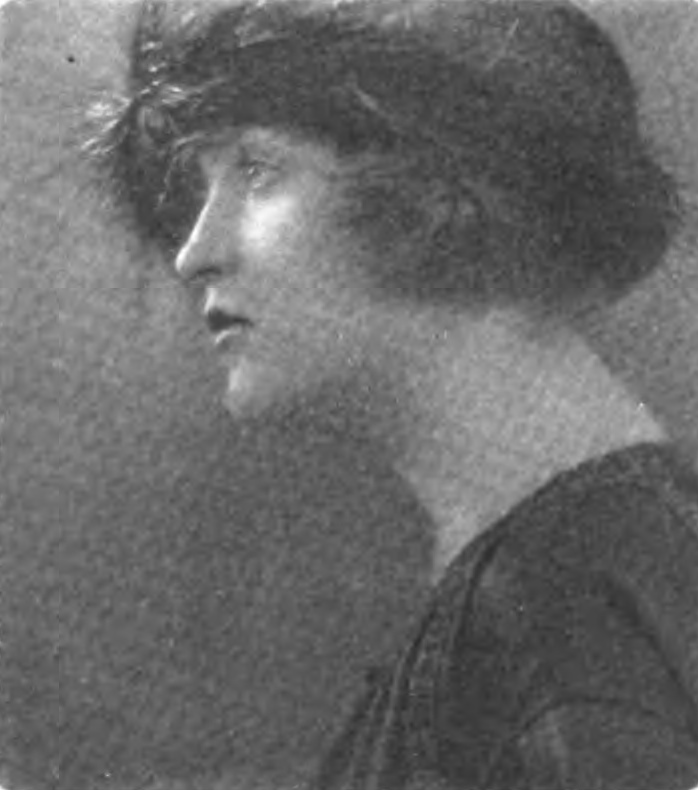

Marion Coakley (September 22, 1896 - August 30, 1968) was an actress on stage and screen.

She was in various theatrical productions from 1917 into the later 1920s.

The New York Public Library has a collection of photographs of her from White Studio. The Library of Congress has a glass negative photo of her.

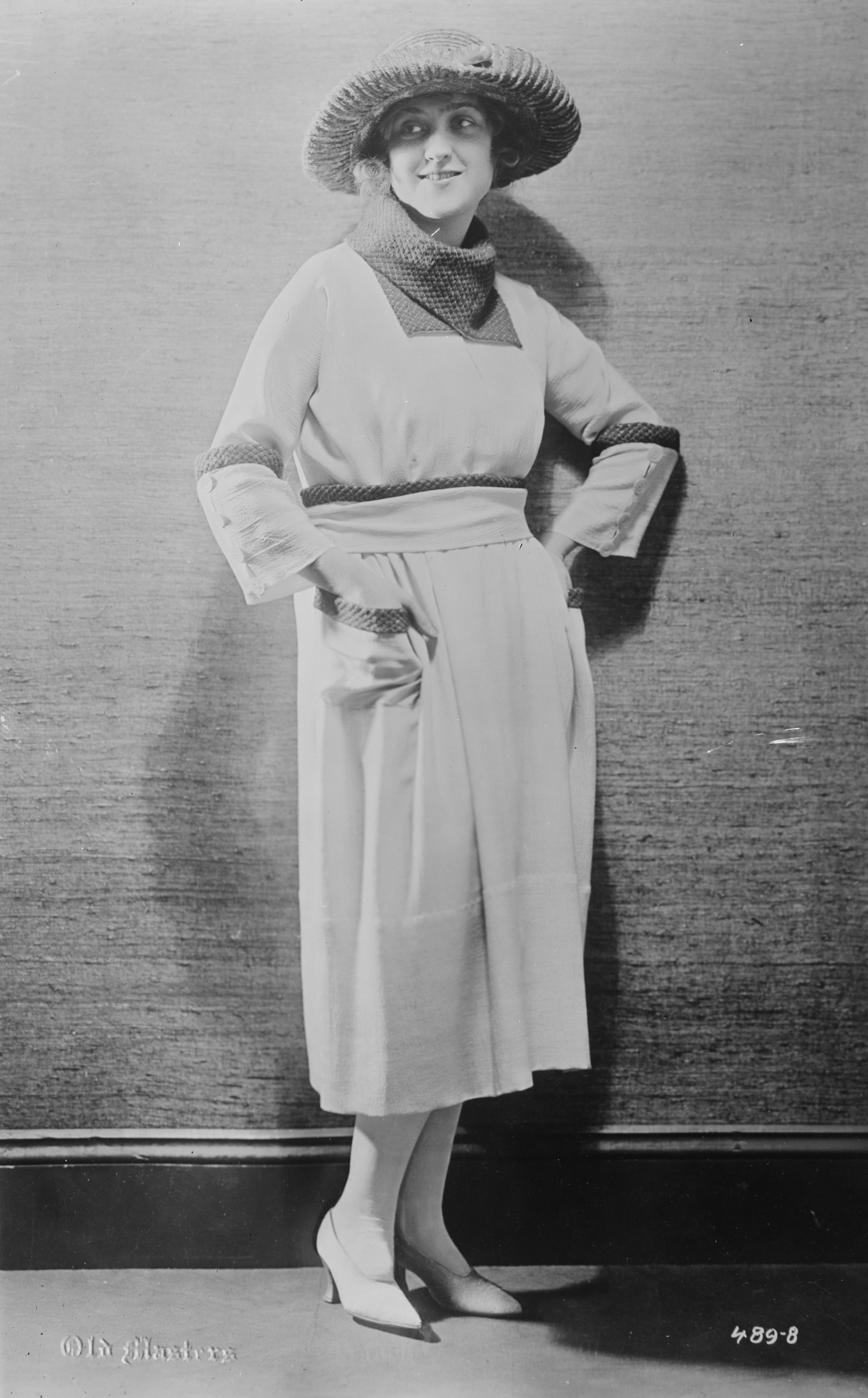

== Theater ==
- An American Ace
- The Country Cousin (1917)
- The Meanest Man in the World
- Cappy
- The Mountain Man (1922)
- The Werewolf (1924)
- The Racket (1927)

== Filmography ==
- The Lost Battalion (1919)
- The Enchanted Cottage (1924 film)
