= The Werewolf (play) =

1924 play by Gladys Unger

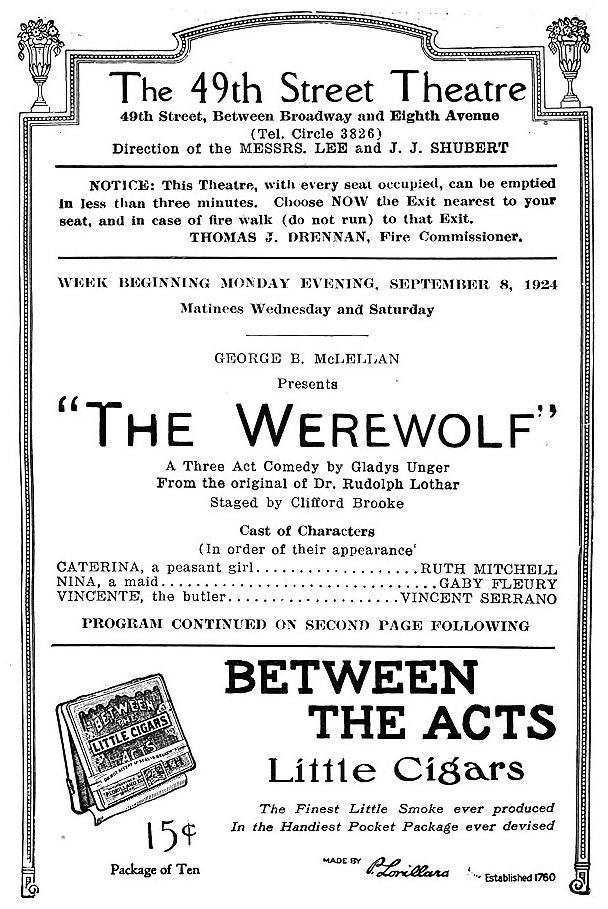
- Playbill for the Broadway production
- Original language: English
- Written by: Gladys Unger
- Based on: Der Werewolf by Rudolph Lothar
- Genre: Comedy
- Setting: A castle in Spain

Premiere
- Date: August 25, 1924
- Place: 49th Street Theatre

The Werewolf is a three-act comedy play adapted by Gladys Unger from Der Werwolf, a German-language play written by Rudolf Lothar. Producer George B. McLellan staged it on Broadway in 1924. In the story, a Spanish noblewoman investigates a spirit that she believes is haunting her castle.

== History ==
The Hungarian-born Austrian writer Rudolph Lothar wrote the comedy play Der Werwolf in German in 1921, under the pseudonym "Angelo Cana". (Note: Some contemporary American press reports said that Lothar had adapted the story from an earlier Spanish version by the non-existent Cana.) While visiting Europe in early 1924, theater owner and producer Jacob J. Shubert secured the rights to adapt the play to English, and hired Gladys Unger to write the adaptation.

Previews for the adaptation opened first in Stamford, Connecticut, on May 27, 1924. They then moved to the Teck Theatre in Buffalo, New York, on May 29. The final round of previews was a five-week run at the Adelphi Theatre in Chicago, starting on June 1. The Hungarian actor Bela Lugosi, who had moved to the United States a few years before, was cast for the role of the butler during the previews. While the production was in Chicago, he was replaced by Vincent Serrano, who continued in the role on Broadway. (Note: It is unclear whether Lugosi was fired or left for reasons of his own.) The Broadway opening was at the Shubert Organization's 49th Street Theatre on August 25, 1924. The production ran there for three months with 112 performances.

Unger's adaptation was not published.

== Plot ==
The Duchess of Capablanca thinks her castle is haunted by the spirit of the famous libertine Don Juan. Psychic investigator Eliphas Leone believes this spirit has possessed Paolo Moreira, a young, straight-laced professor at a nearby school, and uses Moreira's astral body to seduce women among the castle's household servants. Rumors about this motivate several young women to approach Moreira in the hope of being seduced. However, when the Duchess attempts to prove the possession by a rendezvous with Moreira, she finds that he is no libertine; instead she discovers that the culprit seducing the servants is her butler, Vincente.

== Cast and characters ==
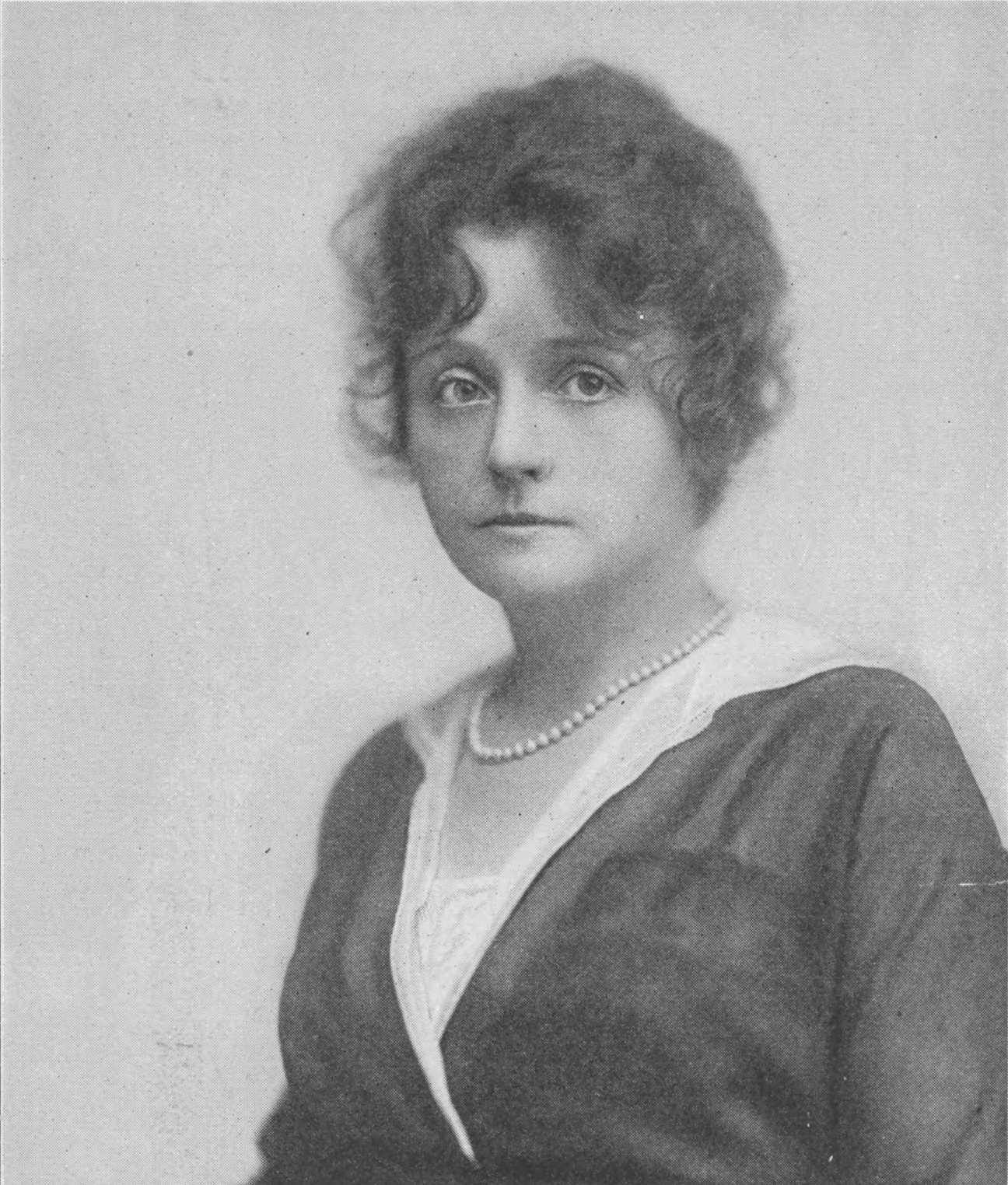
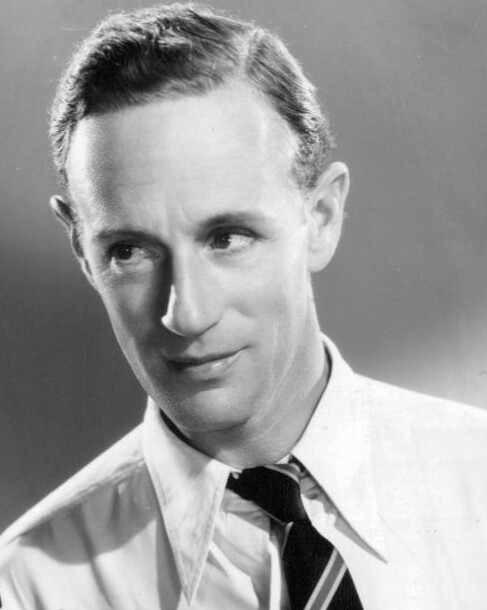
Broadway cast members Laura Hope Crews (left) and Leslie Howard

The characters and opening night cast from the Broadway production are given below:

Opening night cast
Character	Broadway cast
Duchess of Capablanca	Laura Hope Crews
Paolo Moreira	Leslie Howard
Vincente	Vincent Serrano
Camilla	Marion Coakley
Nina	Gaby Fleury
Caterina	Ruth Mitchell
Florencio De Viana	Edwin Nicander
Eliphas Leone	Lennox Pawle
The Priest	Sydney Paxton

== Title ==
The "werewolf" of the title is not a lycanthrope who transforms between man and wolf. The term is used to refer to a dangerous man engaged in seduction of women. It is a parallel to the use of the term "vampire" to refer to a dangerous woman who seduces men, which was a common trope in plays and movies of the era.

== Reception ==
The Broadway production received mixed reviews. The reviewer for The American Hebrew praised the cast, but said the humor was "threadbare" and the solution to the central mystery of the plot was obvious. Writing for The Bookman, Stephen Vincent Benét said the adaptation was one of many European plays that failed to work in translation. Theatre Arts Monthly said Unger made "amusing and satirical" use of psychoanalysis as a plot device, but the result was mostly sexual innuendos without any other significance. In Variety, Robert Sisk condemned the innuendos more vigorously, calling the play "an exhibition of slimy, putrid filth" that wasted the talents of an excellent cast. Burns Mantle also complimented the cast but said the play overall was "labored, coarse and frequently dull". George Jean Nathan thought that the adaptation was well handled and that negative reviewers were mostly offended by the play's sexual humor. Heywood Broun thought audiences showed remarkably little offense at the play's "frivolous immorality", which he took as a positive development compared to earlier attitudes about sexual humor in plays.
