= Two Girls Wanted =

1927 film

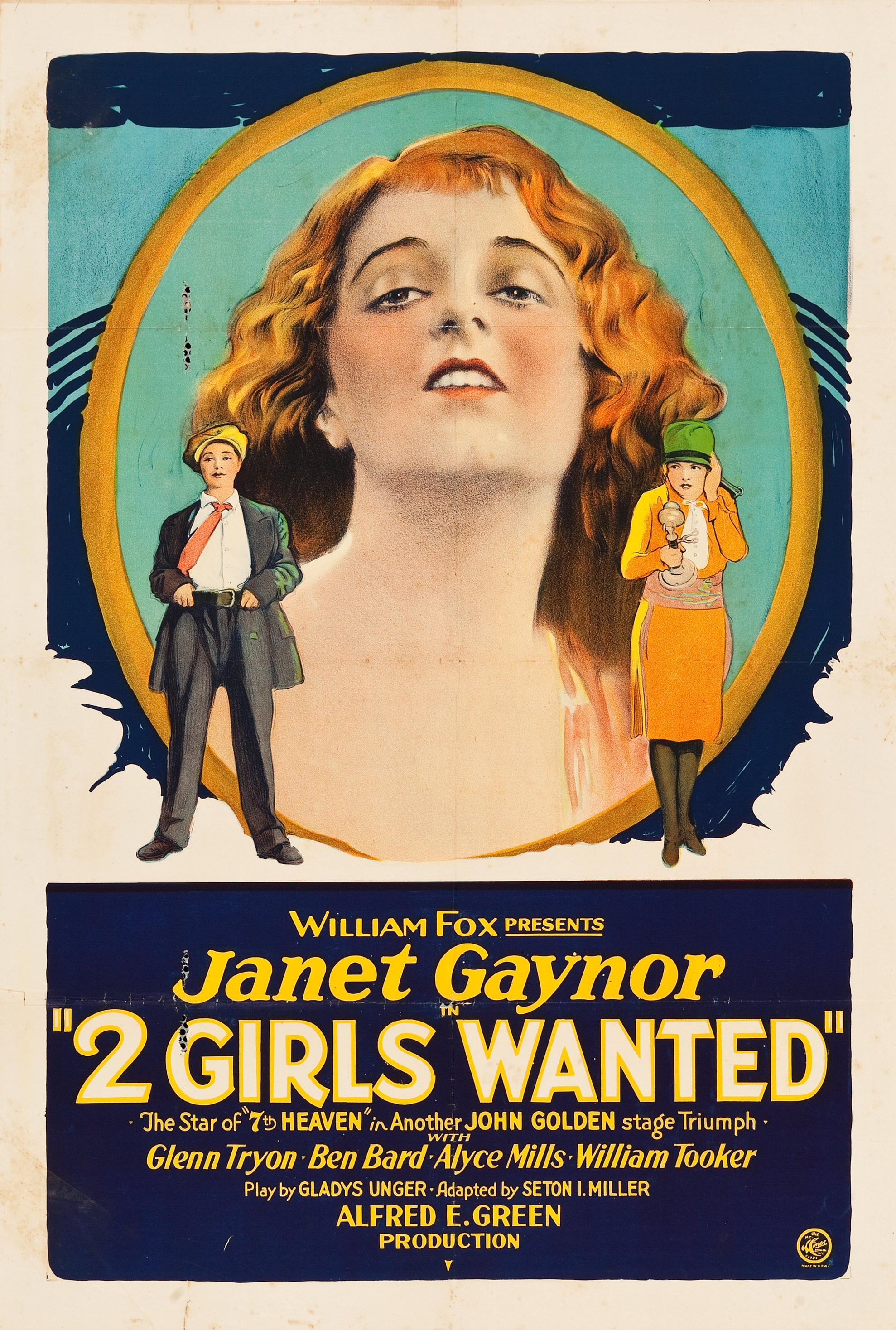
- Theatrical release poster
- Directed by: Alfred E. Green
- Written by: Malcolm Stuart Boylan; Randall Faye; Seton I. Miller; Gladys Unger (play)
- Starring: Janet Gaynor; Glenn Tryon; Ben Bard
- Cinematography: George Schneiderman
- Production company: Fox Film
- Distributed by: Fox Film
- Release date: September 11, 1927
- Running time: 70 minutes
- Country: United States
- Languages: Silent; English intertitles

Two Girls Wanted, also known as 2 Girls Wanted, is a lost 1927 American silent comedy film directed by Alfred E. Green and starring Janet Gaynor, Glenn Tryon and Ben Bard.

== Cast ==
- Janet Gaynor as Marianna Wright
- Glenn Tryon as Dexter Wright
- Ben Bard as Jack Terry
- Joseph Cawthorn as Philip Hancock
- Billy Bletcher as Johnny
- Doris Lloyd as Miss Timoney
- Pauline Neff as Mrs. Delafield
- C.L. Sherwood as Michael
- Alyce Mills as Edna Delafield
- Marie Mosquini as Sarah Miller
- William H. Tooker as William Moody

== See also ==
- 1937 Fox vault fire

== Preservation status ==
With no holdings located in archives, Two Girls Wanted is considered a lost film.

== Bibliography ==
- Solomon, Aubrey. The Fox Film Corporation, 1915-1935: A History and Filmography. McFarland, 2011.
