= Grace Elliston =

American theatre actress

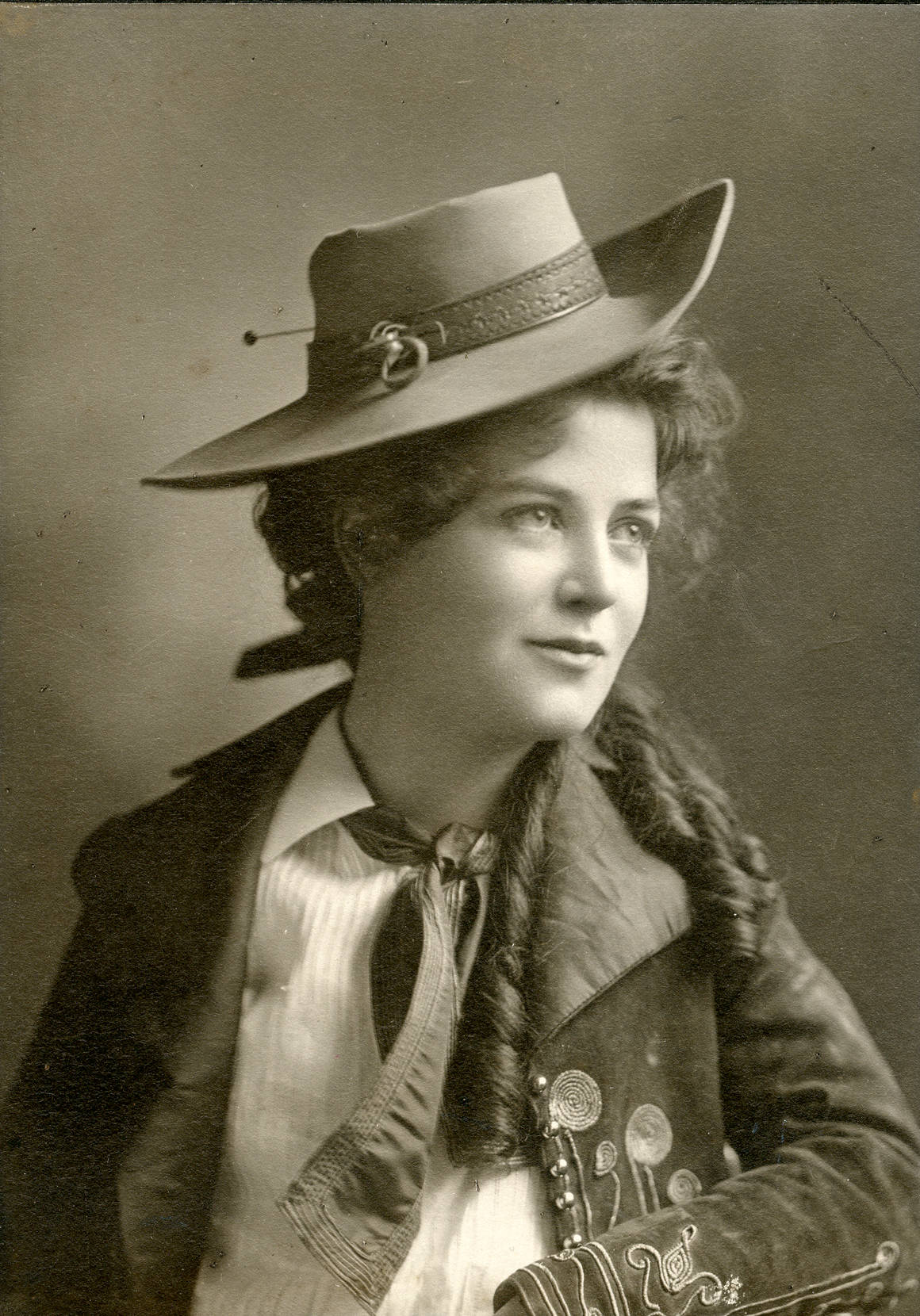
- Elliston in 1902
- Born: Grace Rutter; 1878; 1881; Memphis, Tennessee, U.S.
- Died: December 14, 1950 (aged 71–72); December 14, 1950 (aged 68–69); Lenox, Massachusetts, U.S.
- Occupation: Theatre actress
- Years active: 1899–1922

Grace Ellliston (1878 or 1881 – December 14, 1950) was an American theatre actress.

Elliston was born Grace Rutter in Memphis, Tennessee. In 1899, she appeared in the Broadway play Wheels Within Wheels. Her Broadway appearances included The Country Cousin, The Shadow, Arizona, The Rector's Garden, The Helmet of Navarre, Her Husband's Wife, Ourselves, The Lion and the Mouse and A Blot in the 'Scutcheon, among others. Her final Broadway credit was The Lucky One in 1922.

Elliston died in December 1950 at the Crestwood Nursing Home in Lenox, Massachusetts. She was cremated.
