= Half a Sinner (1934 film) =

1934 film by Kurt Neumann

- Directed by: Kurt Neumann
- Screenplay by: Clarence Marks; Earle Snell
- Based on: Alias the Deacon; 1925 play by Le Roy Clemens and John B. Hymer
- Produced by: Edmund Grainger; Carl Laemmle Jr.
- Starring: Sally Blane; Joel McCrea; Berton Churchill
- Cinematography: George Robinson
- Edited by: Philip Cahn
- Production company: Universal Pictures
- Distributed by: Universal Pictures
- Release date: June 1, 1934
- Running time: 70 minutes
- Country: United States
- Language: English

Half a Sinner is a 1934 American pre-Code drama film directed by Kurt Neumann and starring Sally Blane, Joel McCrea and Berton Churchill. It was based on the 1925 play Alias the Deacon by Le Roy Clemens and John B. Hymer, which was also the basis of 1927 and 1940 films.

== Plot ==
A con man poses as a hillbilly preacher.

== Cast ==
- Sally Blane as Phyllis
- Joel McCrea as John Adams
- Berton Churchill as Deacon Caswell
- Alexandra Carlisle as Mrs. Mary Clarke
- Gay Seabrook as Louella
- Mickey Rooney as Willie Clark
- Spencer Charters as Noel Cunningham
- Russell Hopton as 'Slim' Sullivan
- Guinn 'Big Boy' Williams as 'Bull' Moran
- Teresa Maxwell-Conover as Mrs. Gregory
- Reginald Barlow as Sheriff John King
- Bert Roach as Rumplemeyer
- Walter Brennan as Radio Announcer
