= Al Ruscio =

American actor (1924–2013)

- Ruscio as Tony Paoli Sr. in Any Which Way You Can
- Born: June 2, 1924; Salem, Massachusetts, U.S.
- Died: November 12, 2013 (aged 89); Los Angeles, California, U.S.
- Occupation: Actor
- Years active: 1958–2011
- Spouse: Kate Williamson (1954–2013; his death)

Al Ruscio (June 2, 1924 – November 12, 2013) was an American character actor who appeared in numerous television shows and films.

== Early life ==
Ruscio was born in Salem, Massachusetts on June 2, 1924. He graduated from Salem High School; after graduating college he moved to New York City. During World War II, Ruscio served in the United States Army Air Corps.

== Career ==
Ruscio trained for two years at The Neighborhood Playhouse School for the Theater. He played many roles in New York and in summer stock, including co-starring with Steve McQueen and Kim Stanley among others. His first work in live television came in New York City. He moved to Los Angeles in 1958. His first role there was Tony in Al Capone with Rod Steiger (1958). He then appeared in many television shows including Gunsmoke (1958), 77 Sunset Strip (1959), Bonanza (1960–1961), and in Peter Gunn (1961).

He also acted in soap operas including Port Charles, Days of Our Lives and Santa Barbara as R. J. Bentson. Ruscio made repeated guest appearances on The Lawless Years, The Untouchables, The Rockford Files, Lou Grant, Barney Miller, Hill Street Blues, The A-Team, and 7th Heaven. He also had recurring roles on Falcon Crest, Scarecrow and Mrs. King, Life Goes On, and Manhattan, AZ. Although typically cast in guest spots, Ruscio has co-starred in three short-lived series: Shannon (1981–1982, starring Kevin Dobson), Steambath (1983), and Joe's Life (1993).

In addition to television work, Ruscio had roles in several films including Any Which Way You Can (1980) with Clint Eastwood, Jagged Edge (1985) starring Glenn Close and Jeff Bridges, The Godfather Part III (1990), Guilty by Suspicion (1991) with Robert De Niro, Showgirls (1995) and The Phantom (1996).

== Later years and death ==
In the 1960s Ruscio left Los Angeles to create the drama department at the newly formed Midwestern College in Denison, Iowa. After five years there he moved to Windsor, Ontario, Canada, where he was professor of acting at the University of Windsor. From there he was invited to serve as artistic director of the Academy of Dramatic Art at Oakland University, where his wife also taught acting. They moved back to Los Angeles in 1975 where they resumed their acting and teaching careers.

Ruscio wrote a book, So Therefore …: A Practical Guide for Actors, which was published in 2012.

Ruscio married Kate Williamson in 1954, and they had four children together: Elizabeth, Michael, Maria and Nina; all of whom except Maria are also involved in show business. The couple remained married until Ruscio's death in November 2013; Williamson died one month later, on December 6, 2013.

== Filmography ==
Film
Year	Title	Role	Notes
1959	Al Capone	Tony Genaro	
1960	The Music Box Kid	Thomas "Five Points" Morrell	Uncredited
1964	Deadline for Murder	Walter Sorkin	
1968	Fever Heat	Al Demarco	
1980	The Hunter	Mr. Bernardo	Uncredited
1980	Any Which Way You Can	Tony "Big Tony" Paoli Sr.	
1983	Deadly Force	Sam Goodwin	
1985	Jagged Edge	Carl Siegal	
1987	Medium Rare	Detective Hill	
1989	Blood Red	Antonio Segestra	
1989	Romero	Bishop Estrada	
1989	Cage	Costello	
1990	The Godfather: Part III	Leo Cuneo	
1991	Guilty by Suspicion	Ben Saltman	
1991	Future Kick	Kramer	
1992	I Don't Buy Kisses Anymore	Uncle Dominic	
1994	Dickwad	Mr. Leon	
1994	The Silence of the Hams	Phillip Morris	Alternative title: Il Silenzio dei Prosciutti
1995	Showgirls	Sam Karlman	
1995	Xtro 3: Watch the Skies	The General	
1996	The Phantom	Police Commissioner Farley	
1998	The Garbage Picking Field Goal Kicking Philadelphia Phenomenon	Barney's Father	
2001	Boss of Bosses	Carlo Gambino	
2005	Complete Guide to Guys	Senior Husband	
2007	The Gift: Life Unwrapped	Hank	Alternative title: The Gift: At Risk
2008	Winged Creatures	Angelo	Alternative title: Fragments
2011	Goy	Donald Ritter	(unfinished production), (final film role)
Television
Year	Title	Role	Notes
1958	Playhouse 90	Weinshank	1 episode
1959	Mr. Lucky	Lieutenant	1 episode
1960	Lock-Up	Willy Carson	1 episode
1960	Sea Hunt	Unknown	Season 3, Episode 21
1960	Dick Powell's Zane Grey Theatre	Pietro Poli	1 episode
1960	M Squad	Freddie Canelli	1 episode
1960	Wrangler	Wes Martin	1 episode
1961	Thriller	Allah El-Kazim	1 episode
1961	The Islanders	Rami	1 episode
1961	Peter Gunn	Inspector Georges	1 episode
1962	87th Precinct	Joe Brooks	1 episode
1962	Going My Way	Jimmy Cipollaro	1 episode
1962	Follow the Sun	Gus	1 episode
1963	Ripcord	Carlo Minelli	1 episode
1963	Have Gun – Will Travel	Machado	1 episode
1963	The Alfred Hitchcock Hour	Dr. Taylor	Season 1 Episode 22: "Diagnosis: Danger"
1964	The Greatest Show on Earth	Julio	1 episode
1964	The Great Adventure	Nez Coupe	1 episode
1964	Voyage to the Bottom of the Sea	Dimitri	1 episode
1975	The Six Million Dollar Man	Chester Goddard	1 episode
1975	Marcus Welby, M.D.	Judge Angelotti	1 episode
1975	Police Woman	Scotto	1 episode
1976	One Day at a Time	Mr. Romano	1 episode
1977	The Rockford Files	Vic Cassell	1 episode
1977	Barney Miller	Mr. Seldes	Episode: Atomic Bomb
1977	Starsky & Hutch	Roper	1 episode
1978	The Incredible Hulk	Mr. Sariego	1 episode
1979	Salvage 1	Agamemnon	1 episode
1979	Fantasy Island	Anton	1 episode
1980	A Rumor of War	Uncle Al	miniseries
1981	Hart to Hart	Mr. Six	1 episode
1981	Taxi	Dr. Webster	1 episode
1982	The Fall Guy	Harvey	1 episode
1982	Police Squad!	Dutch	1 episode
1982	T.J. Hooker	Gino Minelli	1 episode
1983	Bring 'Em Back Alive	Miklos	1 episode
1984	Steambath	Davinci	6 episodes
1984	Highway to Heaven	Petros	Episode: Help Wanted: Angel
1985	The A-Team	Gino Gianni	1 episode
1985	Stir Crazy	Mike Forbes	1 episode
1985	Who's the Boss?	Joseph	1 episode
1986	Riptide	Monty Paradise	1 episode
1986	Hardcastle and McCormick	Charlie Masaryk	1 episode
1986	Sledge Hammer!	Don Phillip Souza	1 episode
1986	Simon & Simon	Nicky Walters	1 episode
1986	The Wizard	Pransk	1 episode
1987	Starman	Matteo Gionetti	1 episode
1987	MacGyver	Paul Webber	1 episode
1987	Brothers	Uncle Charlie	1 episode
1988	Days of Our Lives	Miguel Torres	13 episodes
1989	Amen	Willie Garlotti	1 episode
1989	Santa Barbara	R.J. Bentson	
1989	Hard Time on Planet Earth	Carlo Caretti	1 episode
1989	War and Remembrance	Marshal Josef Stalin	Miniseries
1990	The Fanelli Boys	Archbishop Mosconi	1 episode
1991	Beverly Hills, 90210	Henry Silver	1 episode
1991	Ferris Bueller	Tony	1 episode
1991	Dead Silence	Reducci	TV film
1991	Brooklyn Bridge	Johnny	1 episode
1991	The Wonder Years	Mr. Harris	1 episode
1992	Tequila and Bonetti	Stefano	1 episode
1992	Mad About You	Uncle Jules	1 episode
1993	Murder, She Wrote	Santo Angelini	1 episode
1994	Seinfeld	Restaurant Manager	1 episode
1994	Diagnosis: Murder	John Strega	1 episode
1995	Pig Sty	Father Poma	1 episode
1996	ER	Mr. Dellanova	1 episode
1997	Brotherly Love	Harry "Old Man" Gibbs	1 episode
1997	Malcolm & Eddie	Johnny Beaumont	1 episode
1998	Tracey Takes On...	Otto Cornowitz	1 episode
1998	NYPD Blue	Artie Rosen	1 episode
1999	The X-Files	Elder #4	2 episodes
1999	The Norm Show	Father O'Haberly	1 episode
2002	First Monday	Uncle Willie	2 episodes
2002	The Guardian	Albert "Sparky" Walters	1 episode
2007	'Til Death	Len	1 episode
