= Arizona (play) =

1899 play by Augustus Thomas

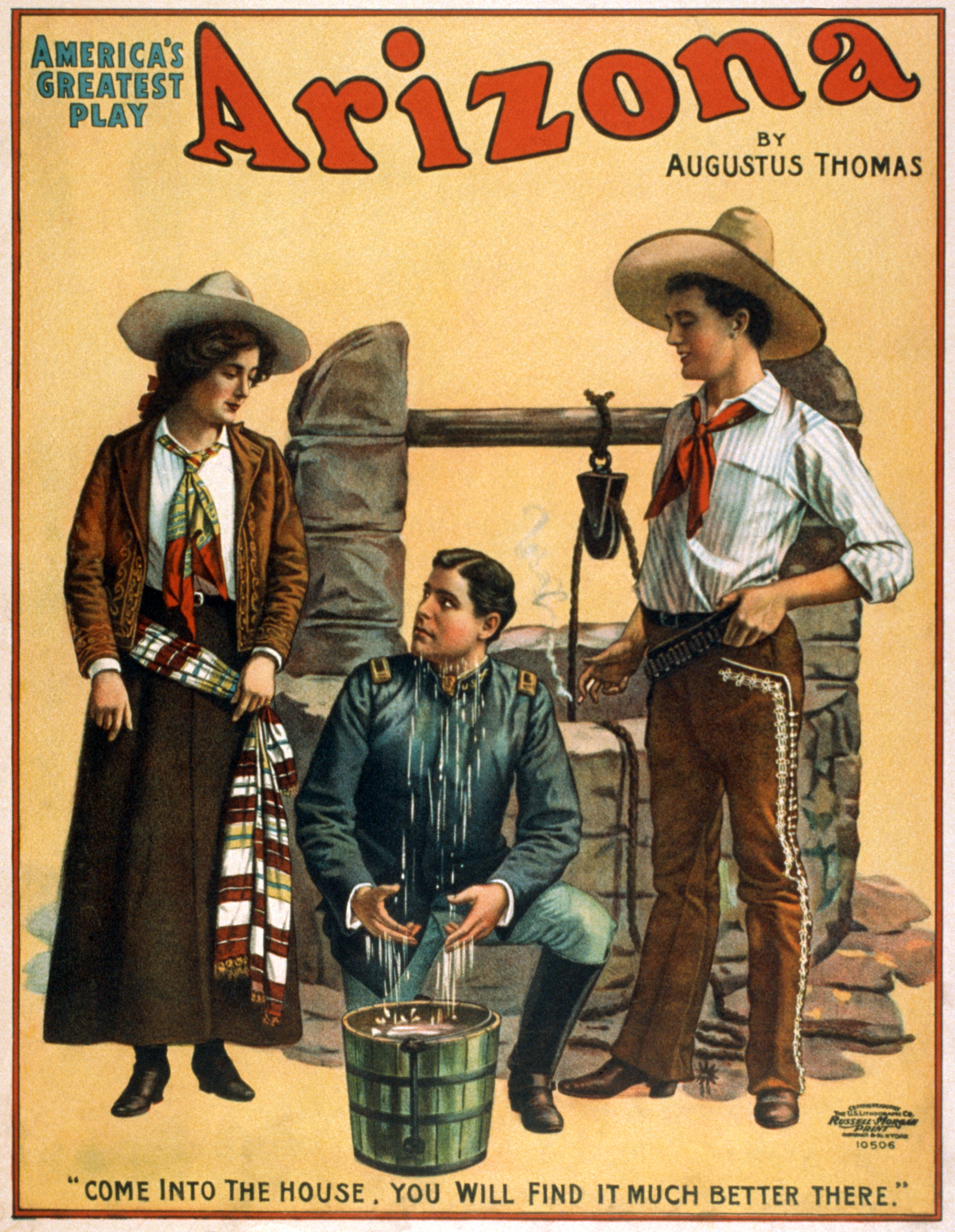
- Playbill (1907)
- Written by: Augustus Thomas
- Original language: English
- Subject: Love
- Genre: Drama
- Setting: Arizona Territory, before the Spanish–American War

Premiere
- Date premiered: June 12, 1899
- Place premiered: Hamlin's Grand Opera House; Chicago, Illinois

Arizona is a dramatic play written in 1899 by Augustus Thomas, considered one of his best. The play takes place in the Arizona Territory before the Spanish–American War of 1898.

The Territory became the U.S. state of Arizona in 1912.

== Plot ==
Arizona tells the story of the affection between a young cavalryman and a rancher's daughter. The cavalryman is accused of stealing books from the library that contained a hidden key to the chancellor's office. Sub-plots include indiscretions of the young wife of an older cavalry officer, a cavalry officer who will not support his illegitimate child, and the love between a vaquero and the daughter of a German cavalry sergeant. Thomas based his play on his visits to Henry Hooker's Sierra Bonita Ranch and the two primary characters Canby and Bonita on Hooker's family.

=== Setting ===
The play is set just before the Spanish–American War and at Aravaipa Ranch, in the Aravaipa Valley near Fort Grant, Arizona.

Act I

Evening, the interior of the adobe courtyard of Canby's ranch house.

Act II

Midnight, drawing-room of Colonel Bonham's quarters at Fort Grant.

Act III

Two months later, dining room at Aravaipa Ranch.

Act IV

Twenty minutes later, the interior of the adobe courtyard of Canby's ranch house.

== Characters ==
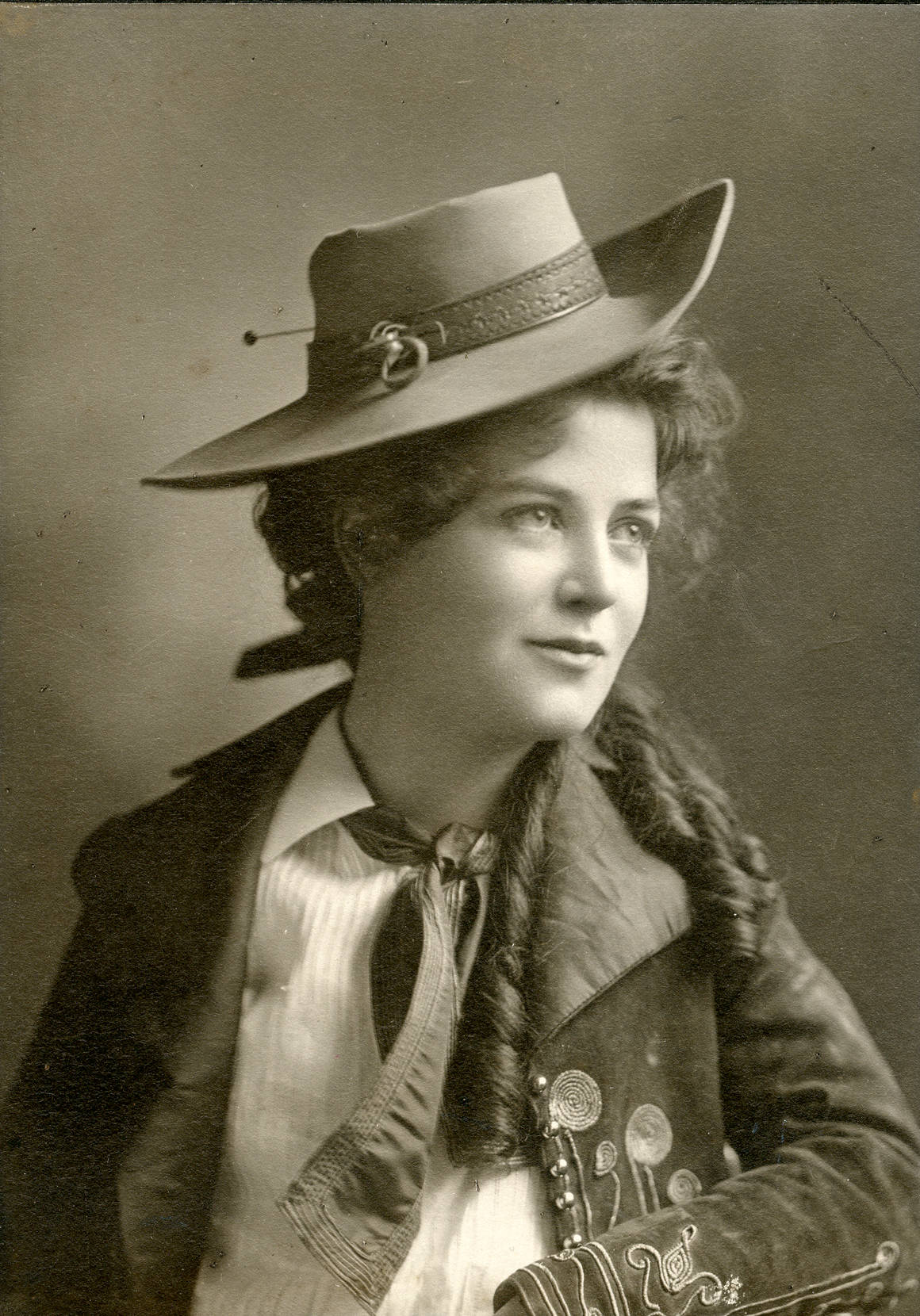
Grace Elliston as Bonita Canby during the 1902 run of Arizona

in parentheses, cast of the Broadway premiere of the play Sept. 10, 1900, Herald Square Theater

- Henry Canby, owner of Aravaipa ranch. (Theodore Roberts)
- Colonel Frank Bonham, Eleventh United States Cavalry. (Edwin Holt)
- Sam Wong, cook. (Stephen B. French)
- Mrs. Canby, wife of rancher. (Mattie Earle)
- Estrella Bonham, wife of the Colonel. (Jane Kennark)
- Lena Kellar, a waitress. (Adora Andrews)
- Lieutenant Harry Denton, Eleventh United States Cavalry. (Vincent Serrano)
- Bonita Canby, Estrella's sister. (Eleanor Robson Belmont; as Eleanor Robson)
- Miss MacCullagh, a school teacher. (Louise Closser Hale; as Louise Closser)
- Dr. Fenlon, surgeon, Eleventh United States Cavalry. (George O'Donnell)
- Captain Leonard Hodgman, Eleventh United States Cavalry. (Walter Hale, later husband of Louise Closser)
- Tony Mostano, a vaquero. (Edgar Selwyn)
- Lieutenant Hallock, Eleventh United States Cavalry. (Malcolm Gunn)
- Sergeant Kellar, Eleventh United States Cavalry. (Thomas Oberle)
- Lieutenant Young, Eleventh United States Cavalry. (Sidney Ainsworth)
- Major Cochran, Eleventh United States Cavalry. (George Morehead)

== Production and reception ==
The play was produced by Kirke La Shelle and opened in Chicago at Hamlin's Grand Opera House on June 12, 1899. With a cast led by Theodore Roberts, sets and costumes designed by Frederic Remington, and authentic characterization of the soldiers and citizens of Arizona Territory, it was received enthusiastically by the audience. The Chicago opening also featured a young Lionel Barrymore in a minor role as Lieutenant Young of the Eleventh Cavalry. Sigmund Romberg later adapted the play as an operetta, The Love Call (1927)..

== Bibliography ==
- New York Times. "New Theatrical Bills", Wednesday, June 13, 1899, p. 7.
- Thomas, Augustus. Arizona: A Drama in Four Acts. New York: R.H. Russell (1899).
