= Money (play) =

Comedy by Edward Bulwer-Lytton

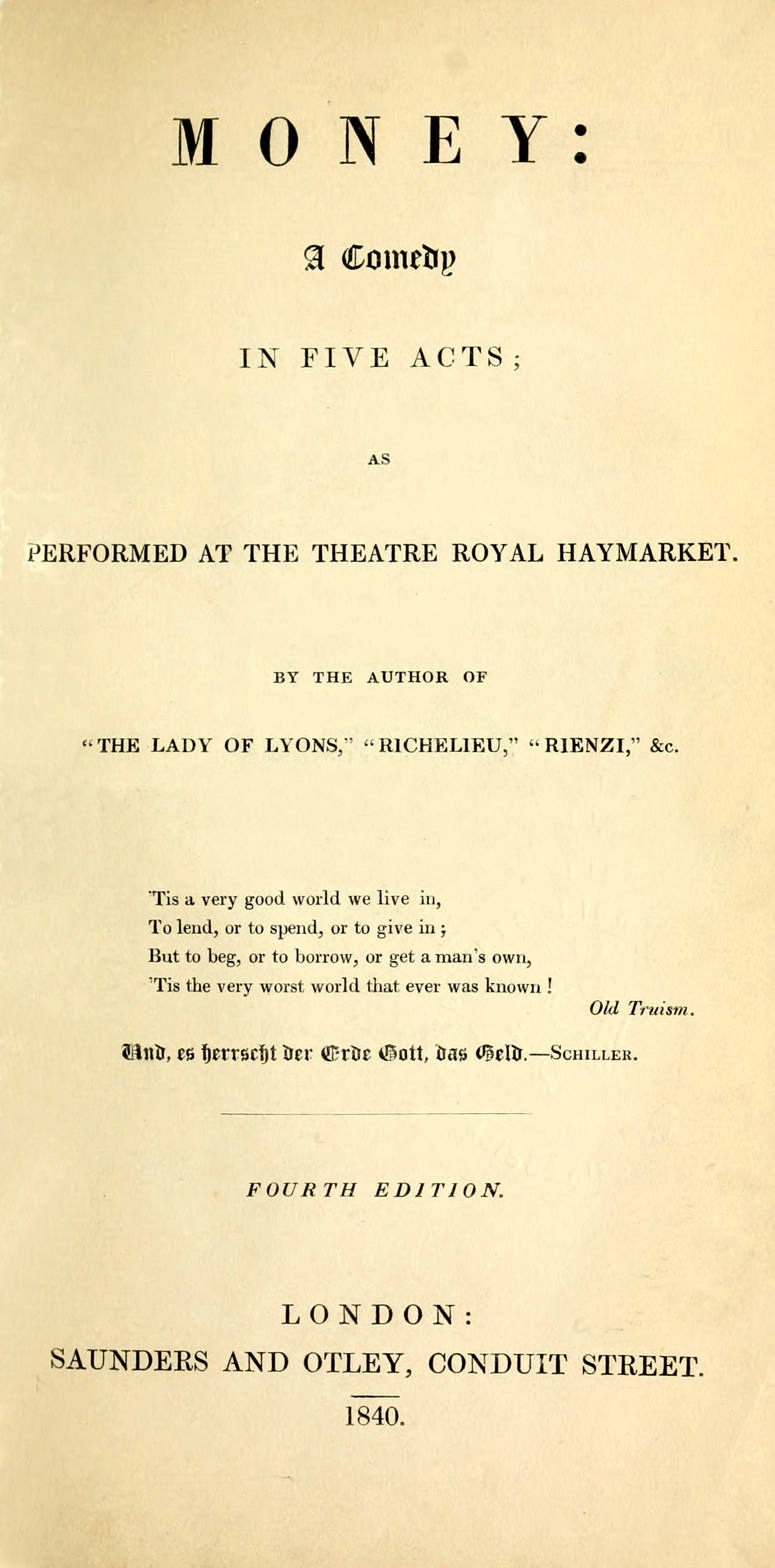
- Fourth edition title page, 1840
- Original language: English
- Written by: Edward Bulwer-Lytton
- Genre: Comedy
- Setting: 19th century England

Premiere
- Date: 8 December 1840
- Place: Theatre Royal Haymarket, London

Money is a comic play by Edward Bulwer-Lytton, premièred at the Theatre Royal, Haymarket on 8 December 1840.

== Plot ==
As relations gather for the reading of the wealthy Mr. Mordaunt's will, Sir John Vesey's poor cousin Alfred Evelyn and the equally poor Clara part ways for fear that a marriage without money would bring them both misery. Sir John Vesey expects his own daughter Georgina to be the will's main beneficiary, but this instead turns out to be Evelyn, previously employed by Vesey as his secretary to make Vesey appear more generous (and thus more wealthy) than he really is. Evelyn decides that – if Clara would not marry him poor – she is too principled to accept him now he is rich and so leaves their relationship broken off.

Vesey suggests that Evelyn marry Georgina and he makes a show of acquiescence, but Evelyn simultaneously embarks on schemes to convince Vesey to break off the engagement by tricking him into believing Evelyn has lost his new fortune. Another rich man, Graves, offers to pay Evelyn's debts and woos Vesey's sister Lady Franklin. Cheques having arrived to clear Evelyn's supposed debts, Evelyn suspects they are from Georgina, confirming that she is not marrying him for his money. He thus parts again from Clara, seemingly forever, but fresh information then comes to light that the cheques were in fact from Clara, with Georgina instead having resumed her relationship with Sir Walter Blount. Evelyn and Clara thus renew their engagement and Graves and Lady Franklin announce theirs.

== Stage revivals ==
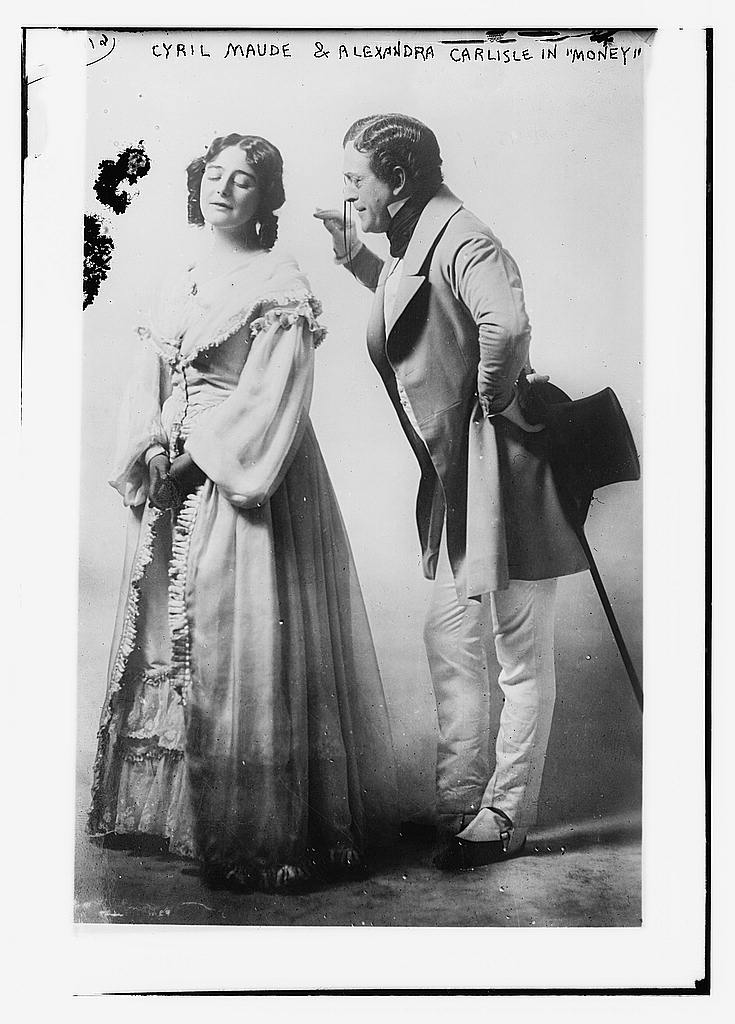
Alexandra Carlisle and Cyril Maude in the 1911 Drury Lane revival of Money

On 17 May 1911, there was a royal command performance of the play at the Theatre Royal, Drury Lane, for King George V, in honour of a visit to England by Wilhelm II, German Emperor, and his Empress, directed by Arthur Collins and produced by Sir Squire Bancroft. The cast included George Alexander as Alfred Evelyn, Irene Vanbrugh as Clara Douglas, Winifred Emery as Lady Franklin, Herbert Tree as Graves and Stout, Laurence Irving as Sharp, Charles Hawtrey as Flat, Weedon Grossmith as Frantz, Sydney Valentine as Green, Alexandra Carlisle as Georgina Vesey, Cyril Maude as Sir Frederick Blount, Charles Rock as MacFinch, Norman Forbes as MacStucco, Sir John Hare as Sir John Vesey, and Lewis Waller as Sir John's Servant, and with music arranged by J. M. Glover.

The play was revived again in 1999, this time at the Royal National Theatre, with John Caird as director and with a cast including Jasper Britton, Roger Allam, who in 2000 won the Laurence Olivier Award for Best Actor in a Supporting Role for the part, Simon Russell Beale, Sophie Okonedo, Patricia Hodge, who won Laurence Olivier Award for Best Actress in a Supporting Role, and Victoria Hamilton.

== Film adaptation ==
In 1921 the play was adapted into a silent film directed by Duncan McRae and starring Henry Ainley, Faith Bevan and Margot Drake.

== Radio adaptation ==
A radio adaptation of the play by Kate Clanchy was premiered by BBC Radio 3 on 19 June 2011 as part of its Money Talks season and repeated on 1 July 2012. It was the first radio play to be directed by Samuel West (who also played the minor and uncredited vocal role of a French tailor). The play was recorded at Bulwer-Lytton's stately home, Knebworth House, and the music was performed by the Endellion String Quartet. The producer was Amber Barnfather. The Financial Times described the production as “faultlessly stylish”.

=== Cast ===
- Alfred Evelyn – Blake Ritson
- Clara Douglas – Laura Rees
- Sir John Vesey – Ian McDiarmid
- Lady Franklin – Celia Imrie
- Henry Graves – Roger Allam
- Georgina Vesey – Phoebe Waller-Bridge
- Sir Frederick Blount – Bertie Carvel
- Benjamin Stout – Richard Cordery
- Captain Dudley Smooth – Tom Goodman-Hill
- Flash – Nicholas Boulton

== Japanese adaptation ==
In 1878, this play was adopted into a modern kabuki style play by Kawatake Mokuami. Called Ningen Banji Kane Yono Naka ("Everything in the world is run by money"), it is still performed to this day.
