= Julian Leonard Street =

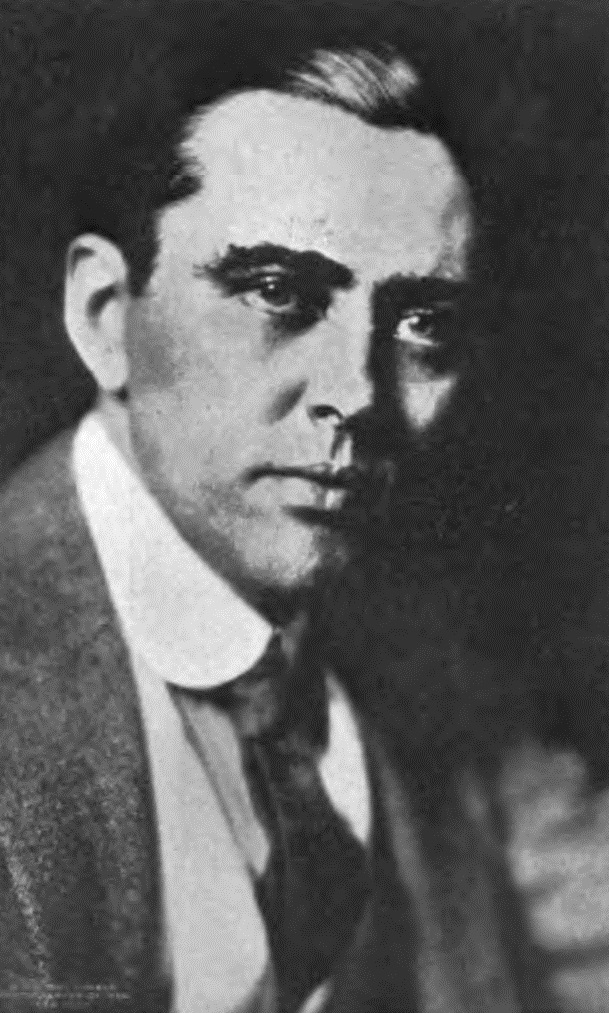
- Occupation: Journalist

Julian Leonard Street (April 12, 1879–February 19, 1947) was an American author, born in Chicago. He was a reporter on the New York Mail and Express (later Evening Mail) in 1899 and had charge of its dramatic department in 1900–01. His writings include the following:

- My Enemy the Motor (1908)
- The Need of Change (1909; second edition, 1914) - Made into 1939 film I'm from Missouri.
- Paris à la Carte (1912)
- Ship-Bored (1912)
- The Goldfish (1912)
- Welcome to Our City (1913)
- Abroad at Home (1914): A book of "American impressions" written after Street travelled "some five thousand miles and visited twenty cities" within his country.
- American Adventures: A Second Trip "Abroad at Home". (1917)
- Mysterious Japan (1922)
- Tides (1926)

He made contributions to magazines. Street twice won an O. Henry Award. His short story "Mr. Bisbee's Princess," published in Redbook and anthologized in Great American Short Stories: O. Henry Memorial Prize Winning Stories 1919–1934, won the award in 1925. The story was adapted as the 1926 W. C. Fields silent film So's Your Old Man. In 1915 Street published a book on Theodore Roosevelt, called The Most Interesting American. He is credited with being the art critic who wrote that the painting exhibited at the 1913 Armory Show by Marcel Duchamp called Nude Descending a Staircase, resembled "an explosion in a shingle factory."

Street gained a measure of notoriety following a 1914 article in Collier's Weekly describing the red-light district along Myers Avenue in Cripple Creek. The Cripple Creek city fathers, unamused, responded by renaming Myers Avenue to Julian Street.

Street moved to Princeton in the 1920s. The university houses his manuscript collection and a library is named after him there.
