= Nydia Westman =

American actress (1902–1970)

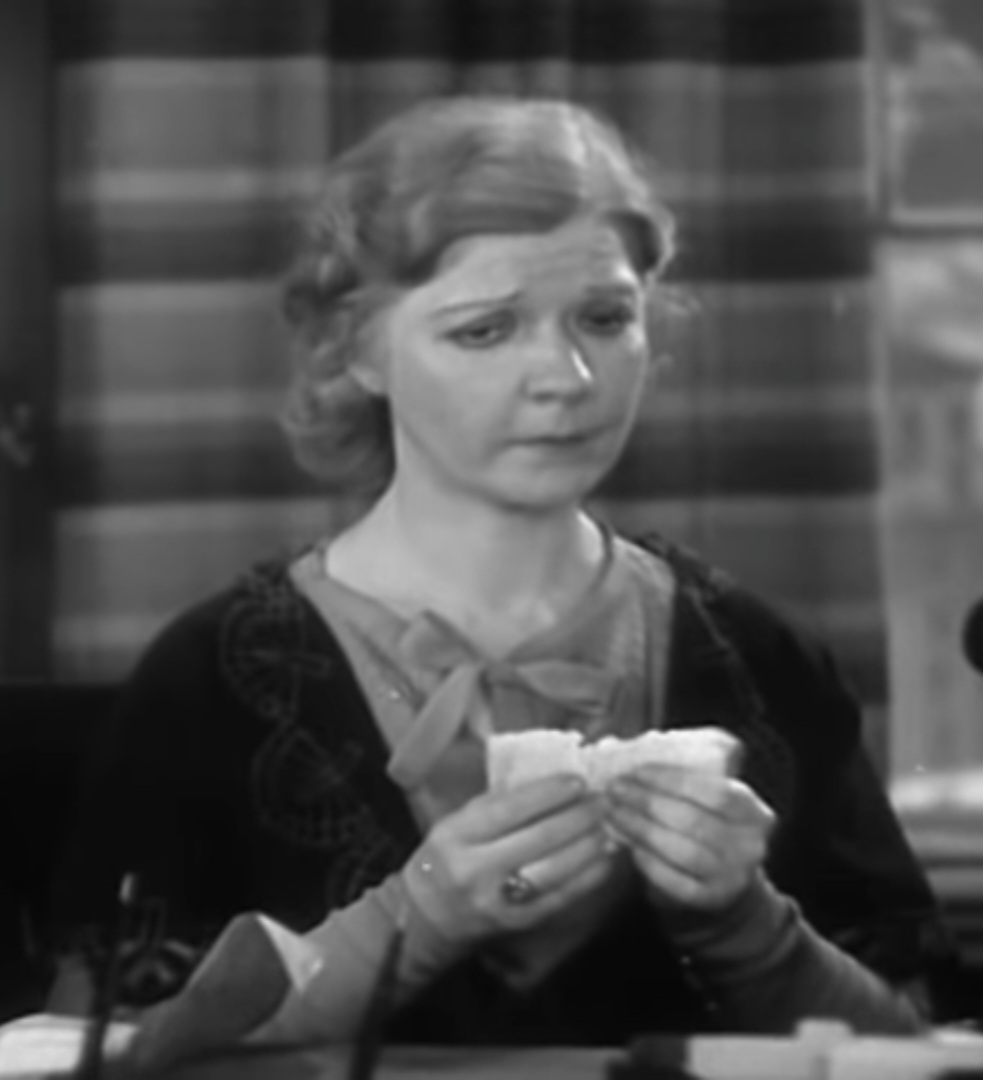
- Westman in Manhattan Tower (1932)
- Born: Nydia Eileen Westman; February 19, 1902; New York City, U.S.
- Died: May 23, 1970 (aged 68); Burbank, California, U.S.
- Resting place: Oakwood Memorial Park Cemetery
- Occupation: Actor
- Years active: 1921-1970
- Spouse(s): Salathiel Robert Sparks, aka Robert S. Sparks (m. 1930; div. 1937)
- Children: Kate Williamson

Nydia Eileen Westman (February 19, 1902 – May 23, 1970) was an American character actress and singer of stage, screen, and television.

== Early years ==
Westman's parents, Theodore and Lily (Wren) Westman were active in vaudeville in her native New York City. In addition to their working together on stage, her mother was a writer and her father was a composer. She attended the Professional Children's School. Until 1921, she performed on stage only with her family.

== Career ==
Westman's career started in theatre begain 1921 and she featured in the Broadway production Pigs in 1924. She starred in another long-running Broadway hit during 1926-1927 with Two Girls Wanted. Her screen appearances ranged from episodic appearances on TV series such as That Girl and Dragnet and uncredited bit roles in movies to appearances in films such as Craig's Wife, which starred Rosalind Russell, and the first film version of Little Women.

Westman's screen debut came in Strange Justice (1932). She appeared in 31 films in the 1930s.

She appeared as the housekeeper Mrs. Featherstone in the 1962–1963 ABC series, Going My Way, which starred Gene Kelly and Leo G. Carroll as Roman Catholic priests in New York City.

Her last role in a Broadway production was Midgie Purvis (1961).

== Personal life ==
Westman was married to Robert Sparks, a producer, from 1930 until 1937; they had a daughter, actress Kate Williamson. Westman died of throat cancer at the age of 68 in Burbank, and was buried at Oakwood Memorial Park Cemetery in Chatsworth, California.

== Selected filmography ==
Film performances
Year	Title	Role	Notes
1932	Strange Justice	Gwen	
1932	Manhattan Tower	Miss Wood	
1933	From Hell to Heaven	Sue Wells	
1933	King of the Jungle	Sue	
1933	Bondage	Irma	
1933	The Way to Love	Annette	
1933	Little Women	Mamie	
1933	Cradle Song	Sister Sagrario	
1934	Two Alone	Corie	
1934	Success at Any Price	Dinah	
1934	The Trumpet Blows	Carmela Ramirez	
1934	Manhattan Love Song	Annette	
1934	Ladies Should Listen	Susie Flamberg	
1934	One Night of Love	Muriel	
1934	Sweet Adeline	Nellie	
1935	Captain Hurricane	Gertie	Uncredited
1935	Dressed to Thrill	Anne Trepied	
1935	A Feather in Her Hat	Emily Judson	
1936	Three Live Ghosts	Peggy 'Peg' Woofers	
1936	The Invisible Ray	Briggs	Uncredited
1936	The Gorgeous Hussy	Maybelle	
1936	Craig's Wife	Mazie	
1936	Rose Bowl	Susie Reynolds	
1936	Pennies from Heaven	Slavey	
1937	Bulldog Drummond Comes Back		
1937	When Love Is Young	'Dotty' Leonard	
1937	Bulldog Drummond's Revenge	Gwen Longworth	
1938	The Goldwyn Follies	Ada	
1938	The First Hundred Years	Midge	
1938	Bulldog Drummond's Peril	Gwen Longworth	
1938	When Tomorrow Comes	Lulu	
1939	The Cat and the Canary	Cicily	
1940	Forty Little Mothers	Madamoiselle Cynthia Cliche	
1940	Hullabaloo	Lulu Perkins	
1941	The Bad Man	Angela Hardy	
1941	The Chocolate Soldier	Liesel	
1942	The Remarkable Andrew	Miss Van Buren	
1942	They All Kissed the Bride	Secretary	
1943	Hers to Hold	Nurse Willing	
1943	Princess O'Rourke	Mrs. Bowers	Uncredited
1944	Her Primitive Man	Aunt Penelope	
1947	The Late George Apley	Jane Willing	
1948	Mickey	Miss Mabel Adams	Uncredited
1948	The Velvet Touch	Susan Crane	
1962	Don't Knock the Twist	Amy	
1963	For Love or Money	Martha	Uncredited
1964	Mail Order Bride	Salvation Army band member	Uncredited
1966	The Ghost and Mr. Chicken	Mrs. Cobb	
1966	The Chase	Mrs. Henderson	
1966	The Swinger	Aunt Cora	
1967	The Reluctant Astronaut	Aunt Zana	
1968	The Horse in the Gray Flannel Suit	Woman in elevator	Uncredited
1970	Rabbit, Run	Mrs. Smith	

=== Television work ===
Year	Title	Role	Notes
1947–1950	Mary Kay and Johnny	Mary Kay's mother	
1948	Actors Studio		1 episode
1950	The Chevrolet Tele-Theatre		"The Veranda"
1949–1951	The Philco Television Playhouse		2 episodes
1951	Young Mr. Bobbin	Aunt Bertha	
1952	Robert Montgomery Presents		1 episode
1953	Broadway Television Theatre	Aunt Minnie Stickney	1 episode
1954	Philip Morris Playhouse		1 episode
1954–1955	Kraft Television Theatre		5 episodes
1953-1955	Studio One	Miss Twink/Cora Kinney	
1955	Ford Television Theatre	Penny	1 episode
1956	Producers' Showcase	Serena Applegate	1 episode
1957	The Kaiser Aluminum Hour	Mrs. Lansing	1 episode
1957	The United States Steel Hour	Miss Prism	1 episode
1960	Play of the Week	Armande Mangebois	1 episode
1962-1963	Going My Way	Mrs. Featherstone	30 episodes
1963	Route 66	Mrs. LeMay	1 episode
1964	The Addams Family	Miss Morrison	1 episode
1964	The Alfred Hitchcock Hour	Aunt Ida Maye	1 episode
1964	Perry Mason	Ivy Stanton	1 episode
1964	Bonanza	Martha Washburn	1 episode
1964	Ben Casey	Mrs. Simmons	1 episode
1965	The Donna Reed Show	Mrs. Robbins	1 episode
1965	The Munsters	Elderly woman	1 episode
1965	F Troop	Mama Dobbs	1 episode
1965	My Favorite Martian	Matilda	1 episode
1965-1966	Please Don't Eat The Daisies	Aunt Alice/Emma	2 episodes
1967	That Girl	Lady	"Rain, Snow, Ice"
1967	Family Affair	Mrs. Elkins	1 episode
1968	Premiere	Woman	1 episode
1969	Lancer	Bridget McGloin	1 episode
1969	Adam-12	Alice Hoyt	1 episode
1967–1970	Dragnet 1967	Martha Anderson Myrtle Perriwinkle Mrs. Morrison Phoebe Kensington Jennifer Salt Mrs. Mary Burnside	6 episodes
1969	Silent Night, Lonely Night	Mae	
1970	Bewitched	Mrs. Quigley	1 episode
