= Gladys Buchanan Unger =

American author and playwright

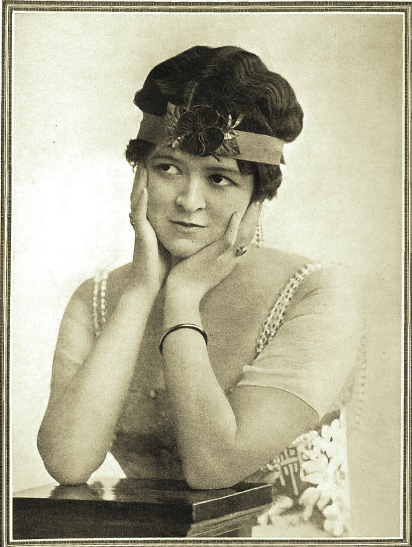
Gladys Unger (1914)

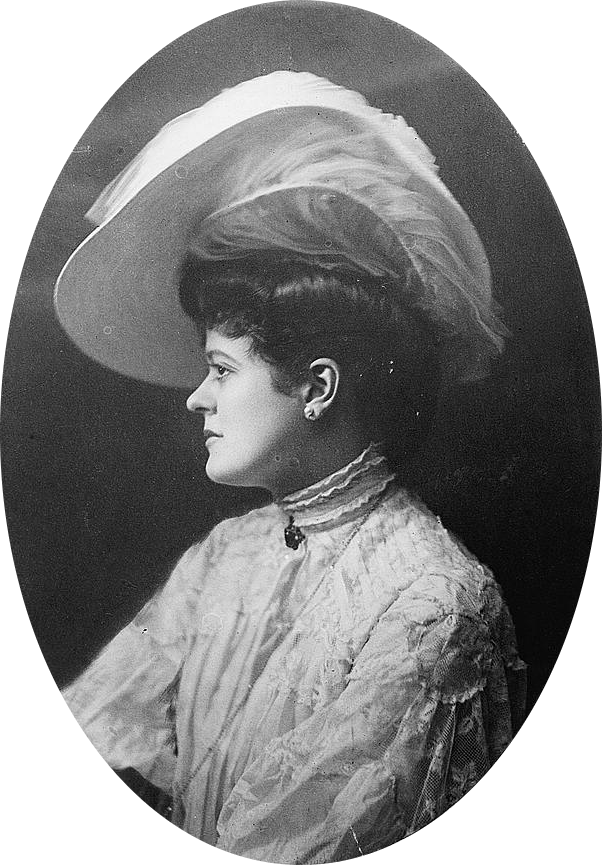
Gladys Buchanan Unger circa 1913

Gladys Buchanan Unger (September 16, 1884 or 1885 – May 25, 1940) was an American author who also lived in England, and who wrote plays for Broadway and the West End, as well as screenplays for Hollywood. She was the author of well over a dozen works for the London stage, Broadway, and Hollywood.

== Biography ==
She was born either on September 16, 1884, or September 16, 1885 in San Francisco, the daughter of Frank Unger. From the age of 3, she lived in England and was educated at South Hampstead. Her initial aim was to become an artist, but she turned to play writing. She was a protegee of Charles Tyson Yerkes, and had $5000 a year from him, enabling her to live in some style in Mayfair, London. There was speculation in the American press about the nature of the relationship between them (e.g. The Oakland Tribune, 19 August 1904, quoting The Wasp). From about 1907 to 1914, she lived with her mother (critic Mrs Minnie Goodman) at Loughton in a house then called Hacienda, now Kilindini, Steeds Way, Loughton. In 1920, she married a dramatic collaborator, Kai K. Ardaschir, in London. She returned to the United States intermittently and in the 1920s, permanently, and died on May 25, 1940, at the Medical Arts Center in Manhattan at age 55.

She is buried in Woodlawn Cemetery in The Bronx, New York City.

== Works authored ==
- Mr. Sheridan (play, produced at the Garrick Theatre, March 1907)
- The Marriage Market (1911) English adaptation
- Betty (1916)
- The Monkey (1924) English adaptation of Le Singe qui parle by René Fauchois
- The Werewolf (1924) English adaptation of Der Werwolf by Rudolph Lothar
- Starlight (1925) - the play was adapted as The Divine Woman (1928) by Victor Sjöström
- Two Girls Wanted (1926)
- The Heart Thief (1927)
- Dynamite (1929)
- Marianne (1929) (silent and musical versions)
- Madam Satan (1931)
- Many a Slip (1931)
- Sylvia Scarlett (1935)
- Music Is Magic (1935)
- Night of Mystery (1937)
- Daughter of Shanghai (1937)
- Paradise for Three (1938)

=== Filmography ===
- Wayward (1932)
