= The Wren (play) =

1921 play by Booth Tarkington

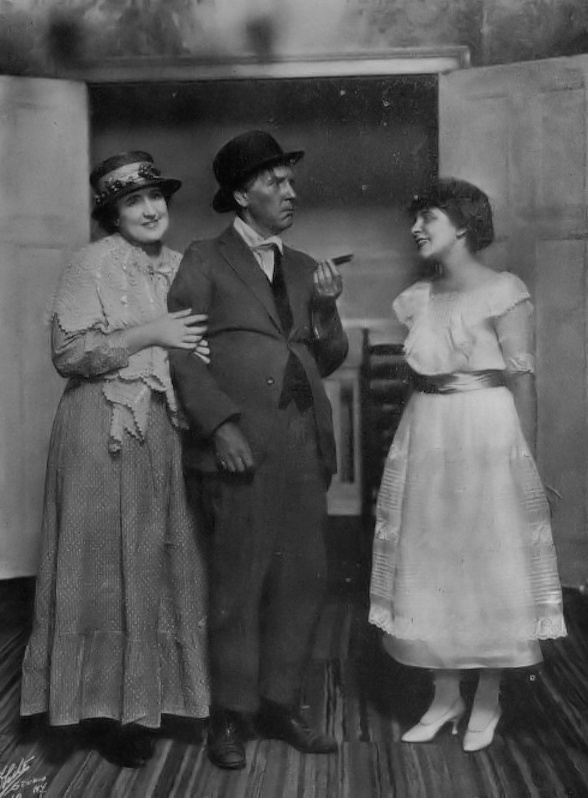
- Original language: English
- Written by: Booth Tarkington
- Subject: Romantic quadrilateral
- Genre: Comedy
- Setting: Capt. Olds Place near Ogunquit, Maine

Premiere
- Date: October 10, 1921
- Place: Gaiety Theatre
- Directed by: Howard Lindsay

The Wren is a 1921 play by Booth Tarkington. It is a three-act comedy with one setting and seven characters. The action of the play takes place within 24 hours. The story concerns a seaside boarding house owned by an old salt but run by his young daughter, and their guests: a Canadian artist and a New York married couple. The play was intended as a vehicle for Helen Hayes, to give her something besides a flapper role.

The play was produced by George C. Tyler and Abe Erlanger. It was staged by Howard Lindsay, and starred Helen Hayes with Leslie Howard. It had tryouts in Springfield, Massachusetts and Boston starting in September 1921, before premiering on Broadway during October. It ran for only three weeks on Broadway then was withdrawn by the producers in favor of Golden Days, another Helen Hayes-led production.

== Characters ==
Characters are listed in order of appearance within their scope.

Lead

- Hugh Roddy is 26, an artist from Canada, a weak cad, who vacillates between Mrs. Frazee and Seeby.
- Eusebia Olds called Seeby is 20, has one year of college, does everything and manages everyone. (Note: During the first act, Cap'n Olds gripes about Seeby "bullying" him, lamenting that she was the only one of his eight children to survive.)

Supporting

- Cap'n Olds is an old sea captain; a wheel-chair bound widower who survived a stroke and lets everyone know it.
- Mr. Frazee is a middle-aged textile machinery manufacturer; a strong, practical man who keeps his cool.
- Francis is slender and fiftyish; a guitar-playing porter and handyman, with a strong Maine accent.
- Clara Frazee is Mrs. Frazee, married seven years; stylish, musical, a flirt and a drama queen.

Featured

- Mrs. Freehart is fortyish, the cook for the boarding house, courted by Francis; she also has a Maine accent.

== Synopsis ==
The setting is an old New England farmhouse on the coast near Ogunquit, Maine. The farmhouse's ground floor interior walls have been removed to leave a large open area, with a double door entry in the center stage back wall. Through the open doors may be seen an exterior veranda, the bay, and another cape.

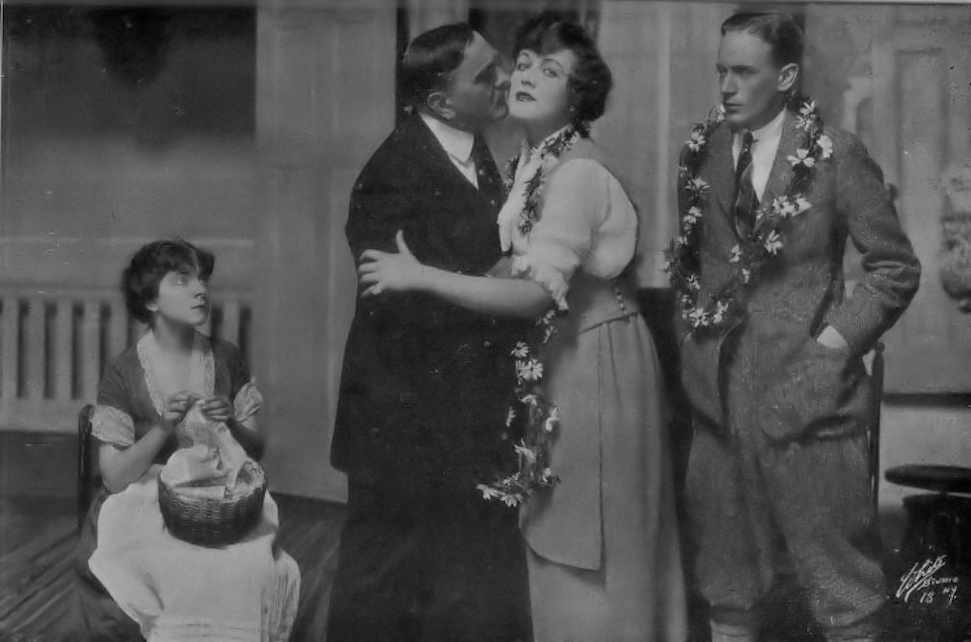

Act I (Interior of Cap'n Olds Place. A spring afternoon.) Cap'n Olds wheels himself in from the veranda, but gets stuck until Mrs. Freehart gives him a push. They are surprised by the unexpected arrival of Mr. Frazee. He asks Seeby for a room separate from that of his wife. Seeby stops Francis and the Captain from beleaguering Frazee with gossip about his wife and Roddy. When they do come in from a morning supposedly devoted to painting, their relationship is betrayed by identical daisy chains of flowers around their necks. Clara Frazee is surprised to find her husband waiting. She portrays Roddy as Seeby's beau when Frazee is around, only to flirt with Roddy when he is not. Seeby, meanwhile, realizes Roddy hasn't done any serious painting since Clara arrived. (Curtain)

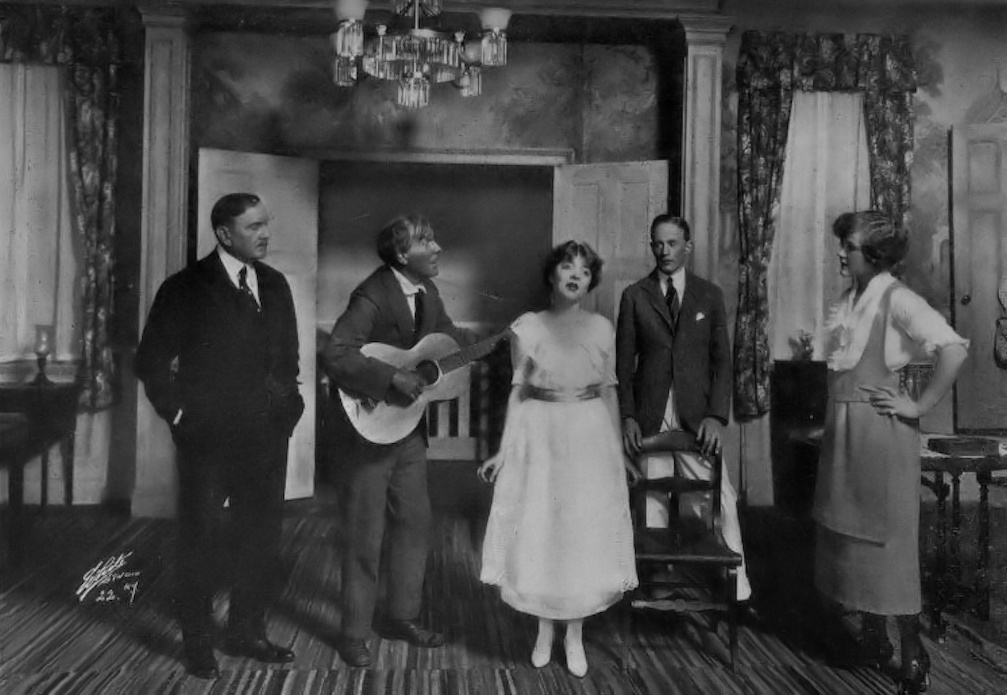

Act II (Same, that evening.) Francis and Mrs. Freehart go out walking together in the evening. Clara has encouraged Roddy to take Seeby for a walk and play up to her, to mislead Mr. Frazee. Clara plays the piano for Roddy when he and Seeby return. Seeby intervenes by calling Francis to bring his guitar. Seeby sings The Nightingale while Francis plays and backs her vocals. Mr. Frazee appears and asks Seeby to have his bill ready tomorrow morning, when he will leave... with his wife. Clara objects and pursues him back to his room. Seeby then has words with Roddy, who is hopeless when Clara is present. Seeby accuses him of leading her on last season and tonight. Roddy protests his sincerity, but is nonplussed when Frazee tells him Clara makes a habit of these liaisons with bohemian types. Frazee then tells Clara that Roddy cannot afford to keep her; Francis has told him that Roddy stays at Cap'n Olds Place at half-rates. (Curtain)

Act III (Same, the next morning.) The next morning Francis bears the brunt of Seeby's displeasure with his gossiping. Roddy confesses to Clara that he has been living off the sale of two paintings since last year, and cannot afford to take her anywhere. Clara realizes she better return with her husband, who understands her and can indulge her need for occasional flings. Seeby sends Roddy out to do some painting, rejecting his request to come along with him. Francis, the Captain, and Mrs. Freehart watch out a window as Roddy makes off alone with his paint gear and lunch box. They tell Seeby how lonely he looks now. After a moment she runs out the door, while the old folks watch amazed at her volte-face. (Curtain)

== Original production ==
=== Background ===
After back-to-back hits in Clarence and Bab, twenty-year-old Helen Hayes wanted to play something other than a flapper. She convinced her manager, George C. Tyler, to find a more mature role for her. Tyler, who was friends with Booth Tarkington, (Note: Tyler's 1934 memoir is dedicated to Tarkington, who also wrote the introduction for it.) commissioned him to write The Wren. Tyler's financial backer was Abe Erlanger, whom he had worked with for many years.

Tarkington spent his summers along the New England coast. He used the area for the setting of The Wren, and characters with the local accent, about which he gave very specific instructions on pronunciation and diction in the published play. He would do so again the following year in Tweedles.

=== Cast ===
Cast during the Springfield and Boston tryouts and the Broadway run.
Role	Actor	Dates	Notes and sources
Hugh Roddy	Leslie Howard	Sep 15, 1921 - Oct 29, 1921	
Seeby Olds	Helen Hayes	Sep 15, 1921 - Oct 29, 1921	
Cap'n. Olds	George Fawcett	Sep 15, 1921 - Oct 29, 1921	
Mr. Frazee	John Flood	Sep 15, 1921 - Oct 29, 1921	
Francis	Sam Reed	Sep 15, 1921 - Oct 29, 1921	Reed played the guitar and sang The Nightingale with Helen Hayes during Act II.
Clara Frazee	Pauline Armitage	Sep 15, 1921 - Oct 29, 1921	Armitage was an accomplished pianist who played on stage at each performance.
Mrs. Freehart	Marion Abbott	Sep 15, 1921 - Oct 29, 1921	

=== Tryouts ===
The Wren had its first tryout at the Court Square Theatre in Springfield, Massachusetts on September 15, 1921. Hayes had top billing in the local newspaper ads. The critic for the local paper made much of the "wistful" quality of Hayes' acting, and also that she seemed a little nervous with the scene in which her character realizes Roddy's insincerity. Both Hayes and Tarkington declined to give curtain speeches, though repeatedly encouraged to do so.

After four performances, the production moved to the Hollis Street Theatre in Boston, opening there on September 19, 1921. The local reviewer reported the audience seemed pleased with the play, but felt there was a problem with the story and characters that was insoluble. The performance on Thursday, October 6, 1921 was cancelled due to Leslie Howard's brief illness, as the regular understudy wasn't up on dialogue changes recently made by Tarkington.

=== Broadway premiere and reception ===
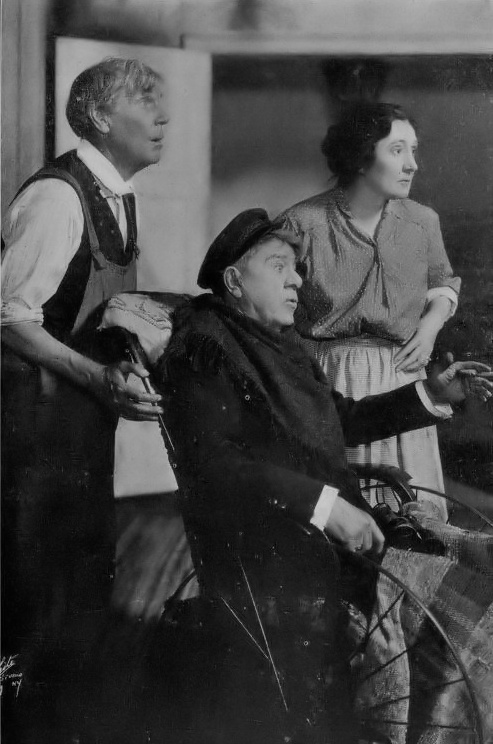

The Wren had its Broadway premiere at the Gaiety Theatre on October 10, 1921. Hayes' billing in newspaper ads dropped to below the title in Manhattan from the top billing she was given during the tryouts. The Brooklyn Daily Eagle reviewer, hoping for another Clarence, spoke of disappointment at The Wren: "The saving grace of the whole performance was the excellent acting of the company. It was decidedly better than the play". The critic for The Brooklyn Daily Times tried to put a better face on it: "...the author has more than made up for a lack of theme and continuity by his very deft drawings of character and the whimsical rightness of the dialect".

James Whittaker in the New York Daily News was vitrolic in his condemnation of The Wren, saying "the curse of the footlights is on the pen of Booth Tarkington" and "he has finally succeeded in turning a good writer into a bad playwright". The New York Herald reviewer focused on Helen Hayes acting, adding "winsome" to an earlier reviewer's "wistful". But he had praise for the other actors as well: "If anybody believes that bricks cannot be made without straw he should observe the efforts of the actors in a Tarkington comedy". Percy Hammond in The New York Tribune felt that The Wren fell between Tarkington's best (Clarence) and his worst (The Country Cousin and Mister Antonio).

Alexander Woollcott in The New York Times called The Wren "charming" and used both "winsome" and "wistful" in describing Helen Hayes. He was alone among critics in highlighting a then barely known Leslie Howard, whom he described as "singularly engaging". But though he defended the play as "deftly and simply fashioned, artfully written" he also acknowledged it as "curiously short-weight", leaving the theatre-goer feeling "undernourished".

=== Broadway closing ===
The play was announced as being withdrawn by the producers in favor of a new work at the Gaiety Theatre, Golden Days, which would also star Helen Hayes. The last performance of The Wren was Saturday, October 29, 1921, while Golden Days opened on Tuesday, November 1, 1921.

== Bibliography ==
- Booth Tarkington. The Wren: A Comedy in Three Acts. Samuel French, 1922.
- George C. Tyler and J. C. Furnas. Whatever Goes Up. Bobbs Merrill, 1934.
