= Jeffrey H. Goodman =

Jeffrey H. Goodman is a neuroscientist at Helen Hayes Hospital in West Haverstraw, New York. His work studying treatments for Epilepsy has been published in many journals (H-index 30) and presented at conferences all over the world. One of his recent publications involves a procedure for delivering a low frequency sine wave stimulation as a possible treatment. This abstract, co-authored by Jane Schon, Sudarshan Phani, and Jared Zucker, was published in the 2006 Abstract publication of Epilepsia (published by the American Epilepsy Society).
