= Golden Days (play) =

1919 play by Sidney Toler and Marion Short

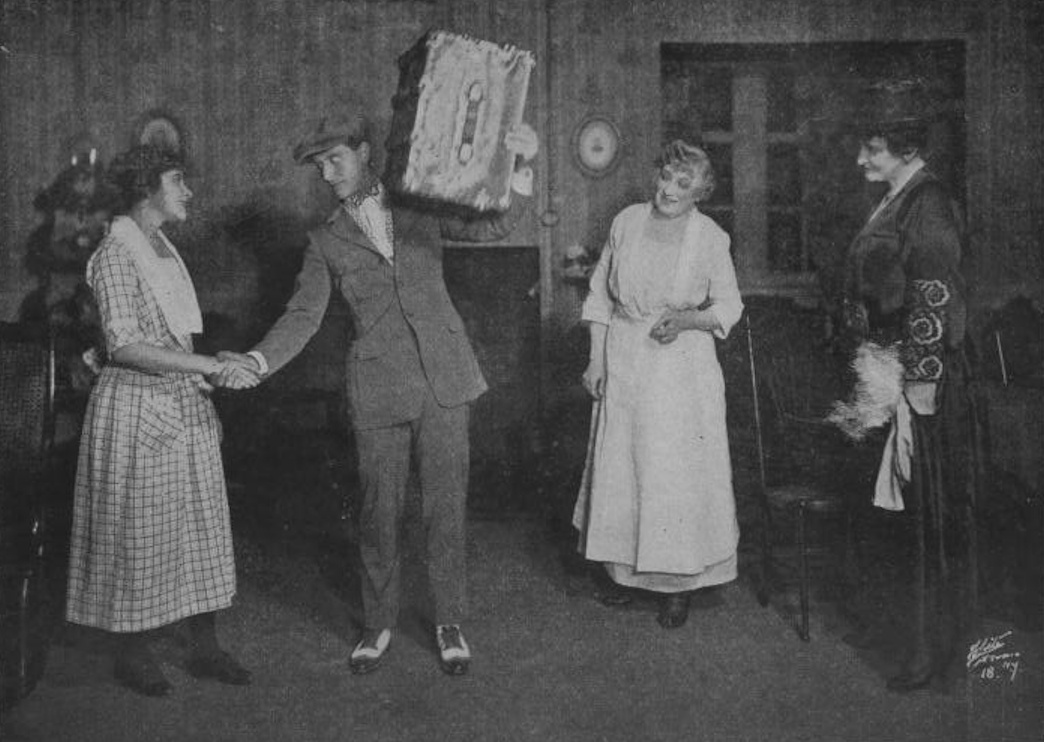
- 1921 Broadway production
- Original language: English
- Written by: Sidney Toler and Marion Short
- Subject: Youthful romance
- Genre: Comedy
- Setting: The Simmonds home and a hotel in Connecticut; the Kirkland sitting room in Manhattan.

Premiere
- Date: November 1, 1921
- Place: Gaiety Theatre
- Directed by: Frederick Stanhope

Golden Days is a 1919 play by Sidney Toler and Marion Short, originally titled The Golden Age. It is a comedy in four-acts, each having a sub-title, with three settings and fourteen characters. The action of the play takes place during Spring and Summer of 1917, and Spring 1919. The story concerns the blossoming of a small-town Connecticut girl and her awakening to a true romance. At the time, the play was considered unusual since all but three characters were between 16 and 21 years of age.

The play was produced by George C. Tyler and Abe Erlanger. Under its original name it was given a week's tryout in Atlantic City during July 1919, staged by Frederick Stanhope, with Helen Hayes as the female lead. It was not performed again until March 1920, after it had been retitled to Golden Days. Again staged by Frederick Stanhope, it was presented in South Bend, Indiana and Chicago, starring Patricia Collinge. It went on hiatus from June 1920 until it premiered on Broadway during November 1921 with Helen Hayes once more as the female lead. It ran five weeks on Broadway then went on tour.

== Characters ==
Characters are listed in order of appearance within their scope.

Lead

- Mary Anne Simmonds is 18, a country girl who had been briefly engaged to childhood friend Billy Barclay.
- Richard Stanhope, called Dick is 21, son of a New York multi-millionaire, a popular and kind fellow.

Supporting

- Mrs. John Simmonds is Mary Anne's widowed mother who runs a tea shop from her home in Farmdale.
- Sarah Applegate Slissy is the tactless village dressmaker and milliner, of uncertain age and fashion sense.
- Mrs. Drexel Kirkland is Mary Anne's Aunt Maria, a wealthy Manhattan socialite.
- Elaine Jewett is 18, a pretty but snobby girl from New York, who resents Mary Anne's history with Billy.
- William Barclay, called Billy is 20, son of a father who has grown wealthy from war profiteering.

Featured

- Betsy Scroggins is Mrs. Simmonds' dawdling, dead serious house maid, obsessed with the off-stage handyman.
- Felice is Mrs. Kirkland's young French maid, who has all the fashion sense Miss Slissy does not.
- Trelle Webb is 17, a mean-spirited New York girl who is friends with Elaine.
- Lloyd Henderson is 19, a friend of Billy from New York, a true conserver of energy.
- Patty Ellison is 18, a kinder friend of Elaine and Trelle, also from New York.
- Teddy Farnum is 21, also a wealthy young fellow from New York, called "Teddy Bear" by Patty.
- Charlie Mason is another friend of Billy's, who speaks with a slight stutter.

Bit players

- Other young men and women of New York society

== Synopsis ==
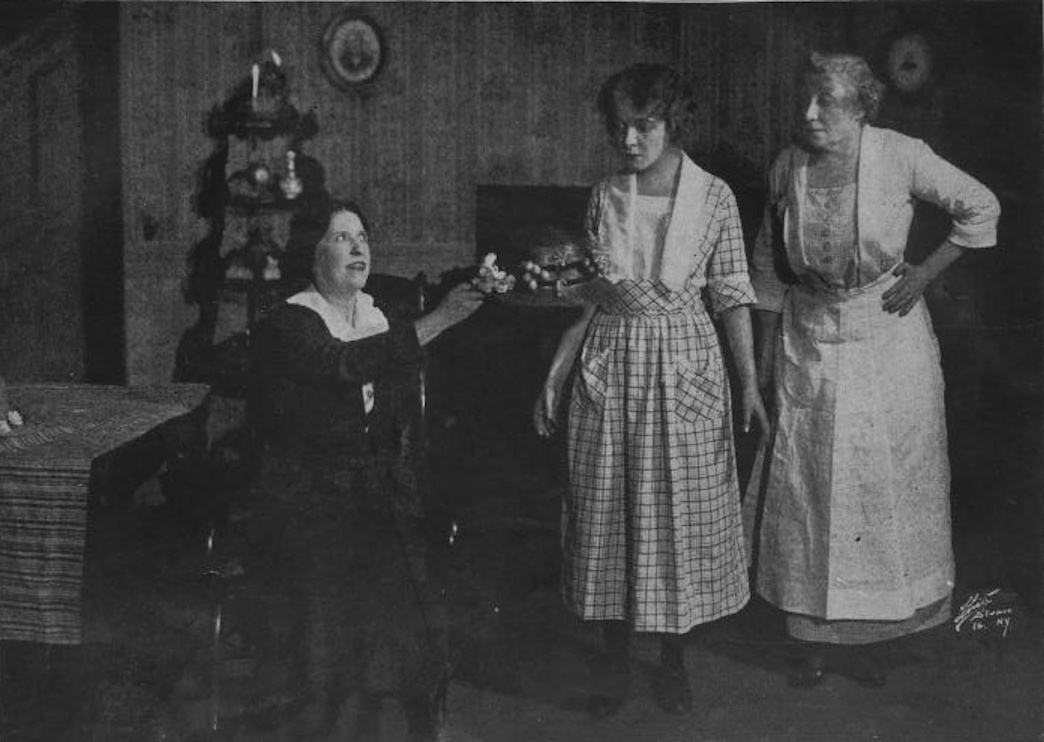

Act I: The Bud (The Simmonds sitting room, Farmdale, Connecticut. Afternoon in June 1917.) Mrs. Simmonds and Betsy clean, while Miss Slissy sits and gossips. When Mary Anne brings in flowers, Miss Slissy upsets her with talk about Billy and Elaine. Mrs. Kirkland and Felice arrive soon after with Dick Stanhope. He is introduced to Mrs. Simmonds and Mary Anne. Elaine and Trelle Webb arrive after Dick has left. They push uninvited into the house and ask for tea, ignoring that the tea shop is only the front porch. Mary Anne asks Betsy to serve them anyway. Elaine taunts Mary Anne, and insinuates Billy deceived her; he will be coming too, she adds. Mary Anne goes to the kitchen. Lloyd and Billy join the two girls. Billy wants to invite Mary Anne to the party, but Elaine protests. Mary Anne returns, having donned her best dress and hat. The two city girls slyly mock her country apparel, and twit Billy about her. After they go, Betsy tells Mrs. Kirkland what they said about Mary Anne. Mrs. Kirkland calls for Felice, and they discuss in French a quick makeover for Mary Anne. (Curtain)

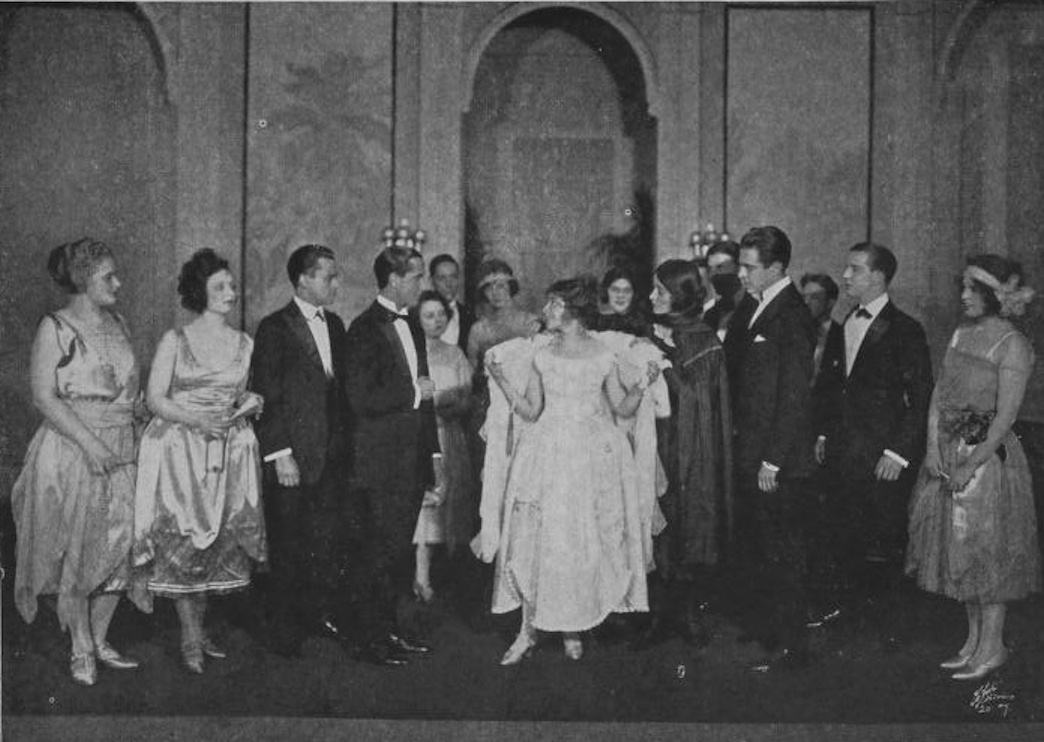

Act II: The Blossom (Parlor of the new Farmdale Hotel. Same evening.) Some soft dance music is heard in the background, as party goers spill out the hotel ballroom into the parlor. They are all young members of society in New York, friends who have come to Farmdale for the new hotel's opening. Between dances they discuss Billy and Elaine, who are arguing on a side porch, and tease Miss Slissy. Suddenly Dick Stanhope, the beau ideal of this social circle, appears escorting "Marion", (Note: The name "Mary Anne" at the time carried connotations of simplicity and rural origin; it was one of the things Elaine and Trelle mocked at the Simmonds home. "Marion" or "Marian" would appear more sophisticated.) who wears a chic new dress straight from Manhattan, and has a sophisticated new hairstyle. The young men are all captivated, the young women puzzled as to who is this new girl. Elaine and Trelle are shocked to learn she is the niece of the wealthy and influential Mrs. Kirkland. (Curtain)

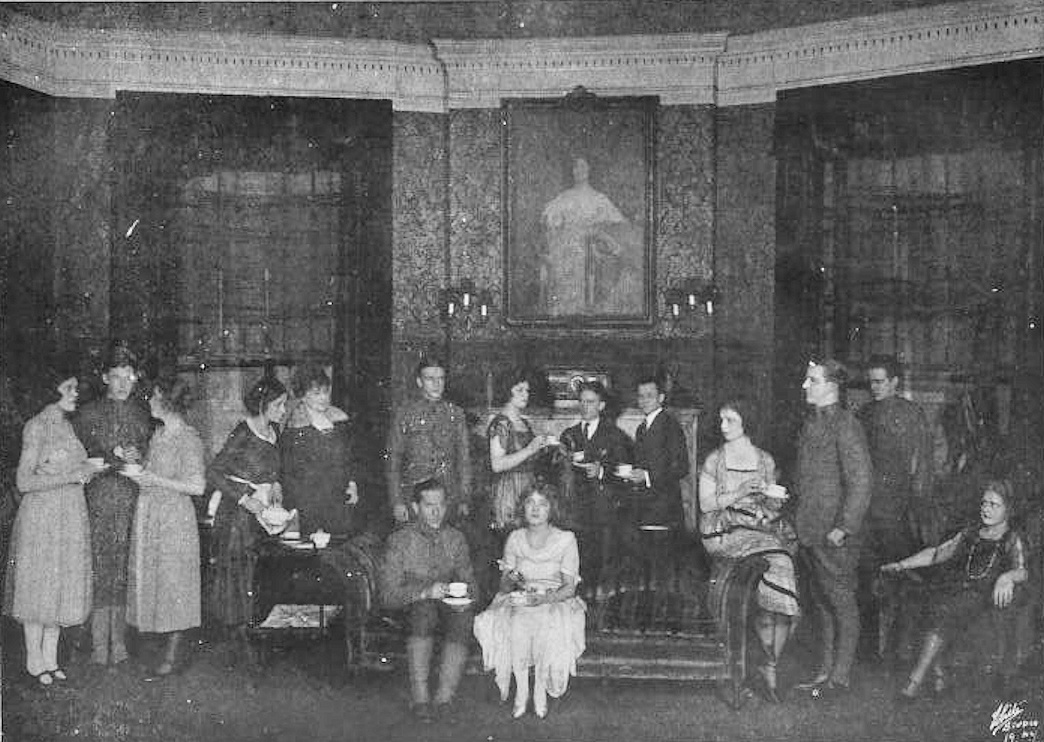

Act III: The Full Blown Rose (An upstairs sitting room in Mrs. Kirkland's home in New York City. Summer 1917.) Mrs. Kirkland presides over a soiree in her salon, with "Marion" as her protege. The young men present wear the uniform of privates in the US Army, save for Billy, who has declined to join up. They are soon to leave for France, and the occasion is a farewell party. Billy is overcome by the change in Mary Anne, and longs to renew the spurned courtship. But she is no longer interested in him. Instead, as the young soldiers depart, she realizes that Dick Stanhope is now the focus of her attention. (Curtain)

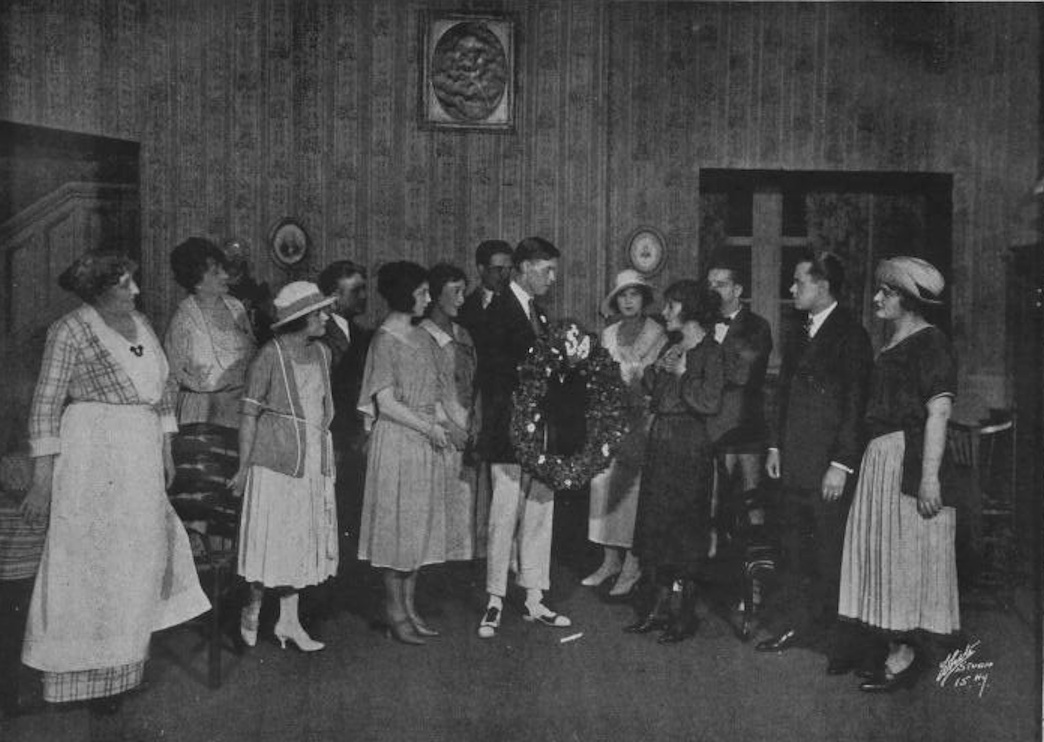

Act IV: The Perfume of Romance (Same as Act I, June 1919.) The whole crowd has gathered at the Simmonds' home to celebrate Mary Anne's return from France, where she had volunteered as a Salvation Army canteen worker. The young men are now in civilian dress, with only Dick missing. Mary Anne fears he has been lost in the war, but a letter from him that went astray before she could read it is suddenly discovered. Dick reappears in timely fashion to join the party. Elaine makes her peace with Mary Anne; she is no longer insecure about Billy. Dick and Mary Anne confess their mutual attraction as the play ends. (Curtain)

== Original production ==
=== Background and 1919 tryout ===
Producer George C. Tyler and his financial backer, Abe Erlanger, had great success with the staging of Pollyanna in 1916, largely because of two young actresses. The lead actress on Broadway, Patricia Collinge, became well-known with that role. Helen Hayes, though she had been on stage since childhood, was not widely known until Tyler cast her for the lead in the second (road) company of Pollyanna. Collinge proved more popular in the Midwest, with a long run in Chicago for Tillie, while Hayes was the darling of East Coast critics, (Note: For an example, see the review by Will Casseboom, Jr, by no means unusual in its fawning praise of Hayes.) with roles in the American adaptation of Dear Brutus, Clarence, and Bab.

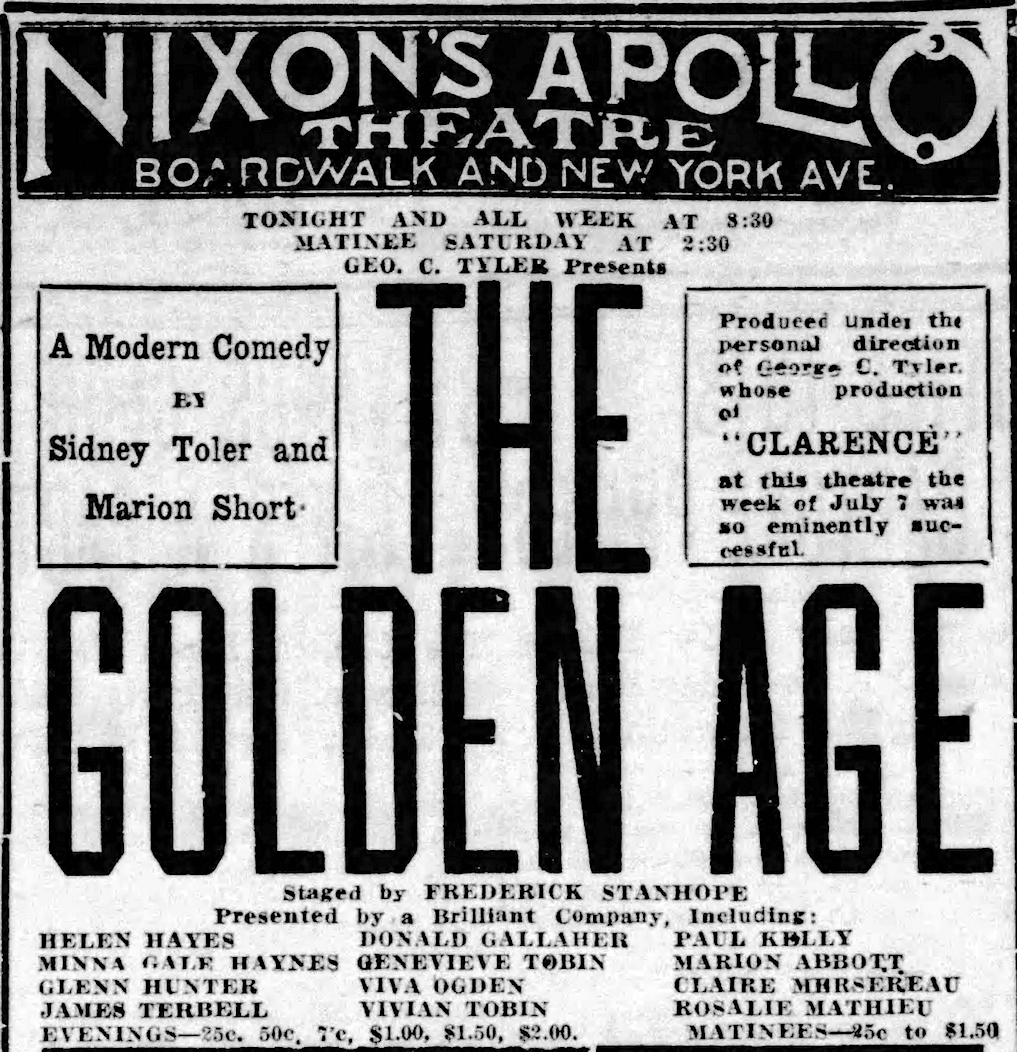

The two actresses would share the leading part in the production of Golden Days as well. Sidney Toler and Marion Short had sold Tyler and Erlanger their play The Golden Age in 1919. It was a Cinderella type story, coupled with casual interactions among young people and a nod to American involvement during the recently ended Great War. The play, staged by Frederick Stanhope, was given a weeks tryout at Nixon's Apollo Theatre in Atlantic City, New Jersey starting July 28, 1919. Helen Hayes starred with Donald Gallaher as her male lead and a strong supporting company. Reviews of the play were positive; though acknowledging the lightweight storyline, the local critics were enthusiastic about Hayes' performance and that of the supporting cast. They also reported that Hayes was summoned forth by the audience after each act for curtain calls. An interview of author Sidney Toler soon after the tryout mentioned he had written "seven successful plays" including The Golden Age in the past two years.

The Actors' Equity strike of 1919 erupted this same month; though lasting only thirty days, it had an impact on production schedules. No more is heard of The Golden Age until November 1919, when a musical comedy by that name, produced by F. Ray Comstock and Morris Gest, written by Guy Bolton and Jerome Kern and starring Harry Fox, was reported to be starting rehearsals in Manhattan.

Cast during the 1919 Atlantic City tryout

Role	Actor	Dates	Notes and sources
Mary Anne Simmonds	Helen Hayes	Jul 28, 1919 - Aug 02, 1919	
Dick Stanhope	Donald Gallaher	Jul 28, 1919 - Aug 02, 1919	
Mrs. Simmonds	Marion Abbott	Jul 28, 1919 - Aug 02, 1919	
Miss Slissy	Vivia Ogden	Jul 28, 1919 - Aug 02, 1919	
Mrs. Kirkland	Minna Gale Haynes	Jul 28, 1919 - Aug 02, 1919	
Elaine Jewett	Claire Mersereau	Jul 28, 1919 - Aug 02, 1919	
Billy Barclay	Glenn Hunter	Jul 28, 1919 - Aug 02, 1919	
Betsy Scroggins	Jo Wallace	Jul 28, 1919 - Aug 02, 1919	Wallace was sometimes credited as "Joe", causing cast list confusion.
Felice	Rosalie Mathieu	Jul 28, 1919 - Aug 02, 1919	
Trelle Webb	Genevieve Tobin	Jul 28, 1919 - Aug 02, 1919	
Lloyd Henderson	Paul Kelly	Jul 28, 1919 - Aug 02, 1919	
Patty Ellison	Vivian Tobin	Jul 28, 1919 - Aug 02, 1919	She was the younger sister of Genevieve Tobin, who played Trelle Webb.
Teddy Farnum	James Terbell	Jul 28, 1919 - Aug 02, 1919	

=== 1920 tryout and opening engagement ===
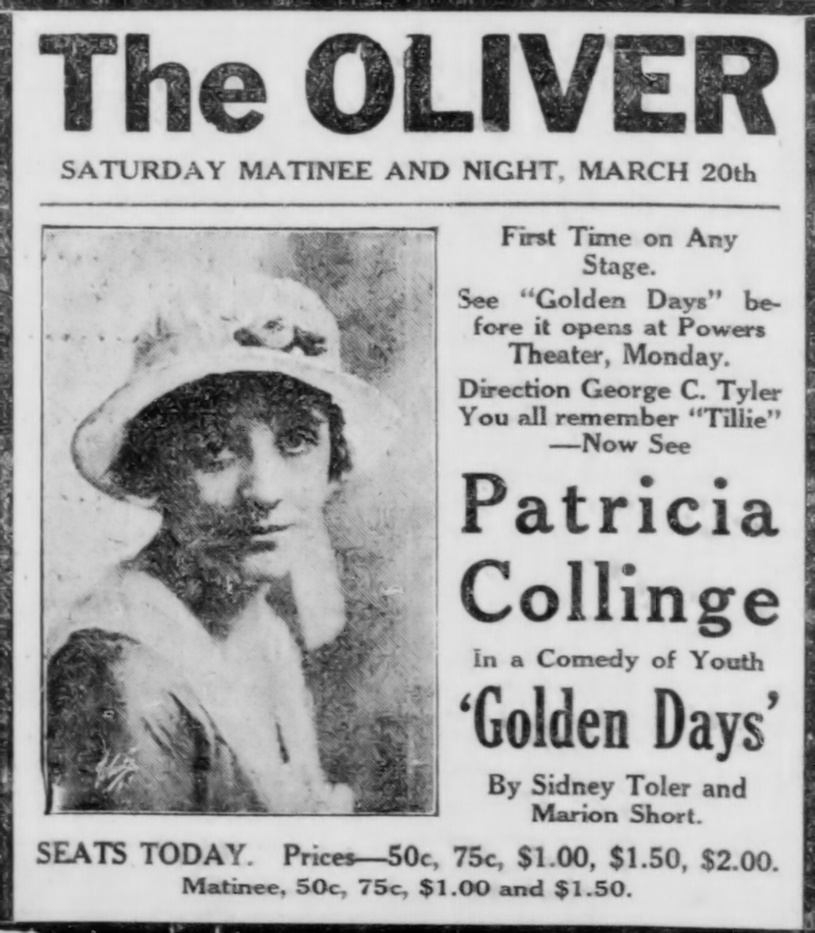

According to critic Percy Hammond, author Kenneth Grahame objected to the original title lest it be mistaken for his 1895 work The Golden Age. It was renamed to Golden Days, evocative of a 1907 popular song. With Patricia Collinge now cast as the lead, Golden Days had one private and two public "dress rehearsals" at The Oliver, a theater in South Bend, Indiana, on March 20, 1920. The private showing was at midnight (Note: A reporter who attended the early morning tryout said the performers came into the theater from the lobby. Patricia Collinge was too short to climb over the footlights onto the stage and so director Frederick Stanhope had to lift her up.) for newspapermen. (Note: Producer Tyler had been an apprentice printer on newspapers as a boy.) This was followed by a public matinee that afternoon, and an evening show. The youthfulness of the plays characters was emphasized in this college town, while a local reviewer mentioned Collinge's voice still retained a slight hint of her Dublin origin. Her leading man, Norval Keedwell, was considered "most satisfactory" as was the supporting cast, while the plot limitations were overlooked in favor of its lack of vulgar suggestion.

The production then moved to the Powers' Theatre in Chicago, where it opened on March 22, 1920. Critic Percy Hammond recognized the charm of Patricia Collinge's performance but was dismissive of the play, calling it "a crude little knick-knack" cobbled together for the purpose of idolizing the leading lady. However, he recognized its appeal to the audience on opening night The play continued at the Powers' Theatre until April 12, 1920, when it shifted to the Blackstone Theatre. The production wound up its engagement at the Blackstone Theater on June 19, 1920, done in by the summer heat.

Principal cast only during the 1920 tryout and the Chicago engagement

Role	Actor	Dates	Notes and sources
Mary Anne Simmonds	Patricia Collinge	Mar 20, 1920 - Jun 19, 1920	
Dick Stanhope	Norval Keedwell	Mar 20, 1920 - Jun 19, 1920	
Mrs. Simmonds	Blanche Chapman	Mar 20, 1920 - Jun 19, 1920	
Miss Slissy	Helen Lowell	Mar 20, 1920 - May 1, 1920	Lowell left the cast when she inherited some property in upstate New York.
Miss Slissy	Helen Weathersby	May 3, 1920 - Jun 19, 1920	
Mrs. Kirkland	Maude Turner Gordon	Mar 20, 1920 - Jun 19, 1920	
Elaine Jewett	Nancy Currier	Mar 20, 1920 - Jun 19, 1920	
Billy Barclay	Paul Kelly	Mar 20, 1920 - Jun 19, 1920	
Betsy Scroggins	Bernice Harley	Mar 20, 1920 - Jun 19, 1920	
Felice	Camille Pastorfield	Mar 20, 1920 - Jun 19, 1920	
Trelle Webb	Norma Lee	Mar 20, 1920 - Jun 19, 1920	
Lloyd Henderson	Ray Van Sickle	Mar 20, 1920 - Jun 19, 1920	
Patty Ellison	Hortence Alden	Mar 20, 1920 - Jun 19, 1920	
Teddy Farnum	Adrian Morgan	Mar 20, 1920 - Jun 19, 1920	
Charlie Mason	Alexander Clark, Jr	Mar 20, 1920 - Jun 19, 1920	This featured role was added after the 1919 tryout.

=== Cast ===
Principal cast only during the 1921 Broadway run.
Role	Actor	Dates	Notes and sources
Mary Anne Simmonds	Helen Hayes	Nov 01, 1921 - Dec 03, 1921	
Dick Stanhope	Donald Gallaher	Nov 01, 1921 - Dec 03, 1921	
Mrs. Simmonds	Blanche Chapman	Nov 01, 1921 - Dec 03, 1921	
Miss Slissy	Florence Earle	Nov 01, 1921 - Dec 03, 1921	
Mrs. Kirkland	Minna Gale Haynes	Nov 01, 1921 - Dec 03, 1921	
Elaine Jewett	Selena Royle	Nov 01, 1921 - Dec 03, 1921	
Billy Barclay	Robert Fiske	Nov 01, 1921 - Dec 03, 1921	A critic smirked at Fiske playing a football team captain, "unless it be a business college".
Betsy Scroggins	Jo Wallace	Nov 01, 1921 - Dec 03, 1921	Wallace was praised by New York critics for her humorous portrayal of the young maid.
Felice	Camille Pastorfield	Nov 01, 1921 - Dec 03, 1921	
Trelle Webb	Ruth Harding	Nov 01, 1921 - Dec 03, 1921	
Lloyd Henderson	S. Iden Thompson	Nov 01, 1921 - Dec 03, 1921	
Patty Ellison	Jean May	Nov 01, 1921 - Dec 03, 1921	
Teddy Farnum	Russell Medcraft	Nov 01, 1921 - Dec 03, 1921	
Charlie Mason	Alexander Clark, Jr	Nov 01, 1921 - Dec 03, 1921	

=== 1921 Broadway premiere and reception ===
Tired of flapper parts, Hayes had convinced Tyler to let her play a different kind of role in The Wren during October 1921. Reviews were mixed; Hayes and the other actors drew praise, but in a losing effort to prop up a weak play. Tyler had invested a lot of money in Helen Hayes and didn't want her associated with a failed production. The play was withdrawn after three weeks on Broadway, being immediately replaced at the same theater by Golden Days which Tyler had been keeping on ice for a year, with Hayes again in the lead. The supporting cast had the luxury of rehearsing long before the premiere, but Hayes' time was taken up with The Wren. However, she had played the character two years earlier, and as Tyler later wrote, she was a quick study.

Golden Days had its long-delayed Broadway premiere on Tuesday, November 1, 1921, at the Gaiety Theatre. Critic Arthur Pollock called the play "convincing" and said it had an "easy humor", despite the commonplace storyline. He complimented Hayes' on her restraint with the character of Mary Anne, and said Donald Gallaher was the only actor to "rise above the level of prep school boys". The Brooklyn Daily Times reviewer said the play was "...well received. Its youthful spirit is spontaneous and catching". The critic for The New York Herald reassured its readers that though filled with youthful characters "the wickedest thing the striplings do is smoke cigarettes, and the girls have not even particularly short skirts".

The New-York Tribune reviewer numerated six costume changes by Helen Hayes in four acts, and remarked upon her returning to "the sub-deb type she forswore in The Wren". The critic for The New York Times pointed out Toler and Short's writing captured the essence of young people's conversation, for both good and ill. There were some memorable moments, mostly involving Helen Hayes, but also much that was inane and uninspired. They praised Jo Wallace, Jean May, and Russell Medcraft, but thought Selena Royle miscast as the mean girl.

=== Broadway closing ===
The production closed on Broadway at the Gaiety Theatre on Saturday, December 3, 1921. It went on tour starting at the Majestic Theatre in Buffalo, New York on December 5, 1921. When it did, the producers granted Helen Hayes top billing replacing the under the title billing in Manhattan.

== Bibliography ==
- Sidney Toler and Marion Short. Golden Days: A Comedy in Four Acts. Samuel French, 1922.
- George C. Tyler and J. C. Furnas. Whatever Goes Up. Bobbs Merrill, 1934.
