= Helen Hayes =

American actress (1900–1993)

- Hayes in 1949
- Born: Helen Hayes Brown; October 10, 1900; Washington, D.C., U.S.
- Died: March 17, 1993 (aged 92); Nyack, New York, U.S.
- Occupation: Actress
- Years active: 1905–1987
- Known for: The Sin of Madelon Claudet; Airport; Happy Birthday
- Spouse: Charles MacArthur (m. 1928; died 1956)
- Children: Mary MacArthur; James MacArthur
- Awards: Presidential Medal of Freedom; American Theater Hall of Fame

Helen Hayes MacArthur (née Brown; October 10, 1900 – March 17, 1993) was an American actress. Often referred to as the "First Lady of American Theatre", she was the second person and first woman to win the EGOT (an Emmy, a Grammy, an Oscar, and a Tony Award), and the first person to win the Triple Crown of Acting. Hayes also received the Presidential Medal of Freedom, America's highest civilian honor, from President Ronald Reagan in 1986. In 1988, she was awarded the National Medal of Arts.

The annual Helen Hayes Awards, which have recognized excellence in professional theatre in greater Washington, D.C., since 1984, are her namesake. In 1955, the former Fulton Theatre on 46th Street in New York City's Theatre District was renamed the Helen Hayes Theatre. When that venue was demolished in 1982, the nearby Little Theatre was renamed in her honor. Helen Hayes is regarded as one of the greatest leading ladies of the 20th-century theatre. Her career spanned 82 years.

A leading philanthropist in later decades, Hayes was most proud of her 49-year association with the Helen Hayes Hospital, a non-profit rehabilitative center overlooking the Hudson River in West Haverstraw, New York.

== Early life ==
Helen Hayes Brown was born in Washington, D.C., on October 10, 1900. Her mother, Catherine Estelle "Essie" (née Hayes), was an aspiring actress who worked in touring companies. Her father, Francis van Arnum Brown, worked at a number of jobs, including as a clerk at the Washington Patent Office and as a manager and salesman for a wholesale butcher. Hayes's Catholic maternal grandparents emigrated from Ireland during the Great Famine. Hayes attended Dominican Academy's prestigious primary school, on Manhattan's Upper East Side, from 1910 to 1912, appearing there in The Old Dutch, Little Lord Fauntleroy, and other performances. She attended the Academy of the Sacred Heart Convent in Washington and graduated in 1917.

== Career ==
Hayes began a stage career as a five-year-old singer at Washington's Belasco Theatre, on Lafayette Square, across from the White House. By age 10, she had made a short silent film, Jean and the Calico Doll (1910).

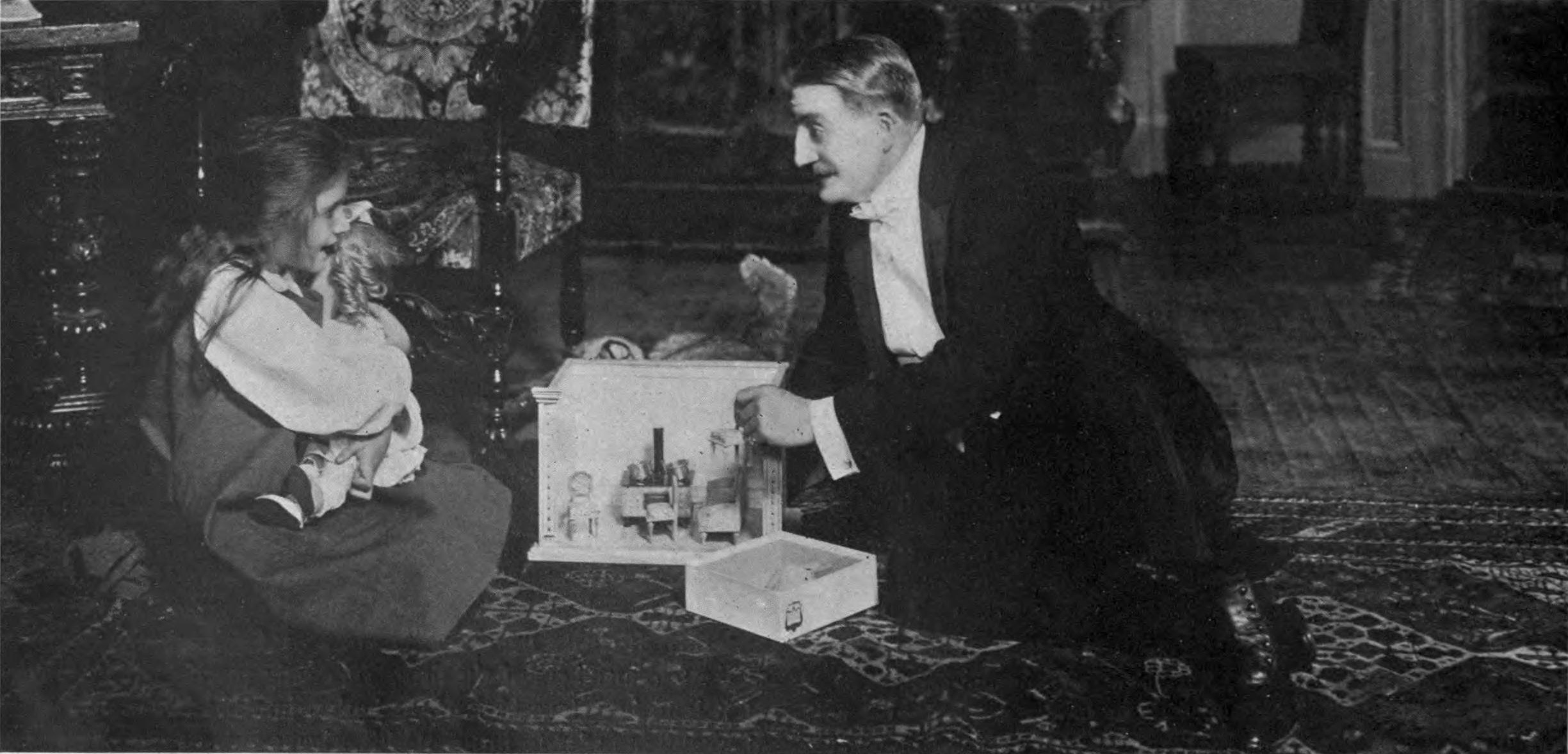
Young Helen Hayes Brown with John Drew in the 1914 comedy play The Prodigal Husband

Her sound film debut was The Sin of Madelon Claudet, for which she won the Academy Award for Best Actress. She followed that with starring roles in Arrowsmith (with Ronald Colman); A Farewell to Arms (with Gary Cooper); The White Sister (opposite Clark Gable); Another Language (opposite Robert Montgomery); What Every Woman Knows (a reprise of her Broadway hit); and Vanessa: Her Love Story also with Robert Montgomery. But Hayes did not prefer film to the stage.

Hayes eventually returned to Broadway in 1935, where for three years she played the title role in Gilbert Miller's production of Victoria Regina, with Vincent Price as Prince Albert, first at the Broadhurst Theatre and later at the Martin Beck Theatre.

In 1948-1949, Hayes hosted and starred in Electric Theatre on CBS Radio.

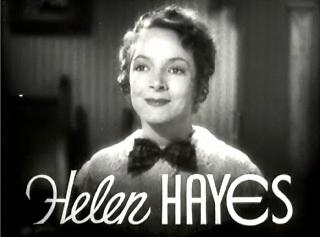
Hayes in the film What Every Woman Knows (1934)

In 1951, she was involved in the Broadway revival of J.M. Barrie's play Mary Rose at the ANTA Playhouse. In 1953, she was the first-ever recipient of the Sarah Siddons Award for her work in Chicago theatre, repeating as the winner in 1969. She returned to Hollywood in the 1950s, and her film star began to rise. She starred in My Son John (1952) and Anastasia (1956), and won the Academy Award for Best Supporting Actress for her role as an elderly stowaway in the disaster film Airport (1970). She followed that up with several roles in Disney films such as Herbie Rides Again, One of Our Dinosaurs Is Missing and Candleshoe. Her performance in Anastasia was considered a comeback — she had suspended her career for several years due to her daughter Mary's death and her husband's failing health.

In 1955, the Fulton Theatre was renamed for her. In the 1980s, business interests wished to raze that theatre and four others to construct a large hotel that included the Marquis Theatre. Hayes's consent to raze the theatre named for her was sought and given, though she had no ownership interest in the building. Parts of the original Helen Hayes Theatre on Broadway were used to construct the Shakespeare Center on the Upper West Side of Manhattan, which Hayes dedicated with Joseph Papp in 1982. In 1983 the Little Theater on West 44th Street was renamed the Helen Hayes Theatre in her honor, as was a theatre in Nyack, which has since been renamed the Riverspace-Arts Center. In early 2014, the site was refurbished and styled by interior designer Dawn Hershko and reopened as the Playhouse Market, a quaint restaurant and gourmet deli.

Hayes, who spoke with her good friend Anita Loos almost daily on the phone, told her, "I used to think New York was the most enthralling place in the world. I'll bet it still is and if I were free next summer, I would prove it." With that, she convinced Loos to embark on an exploration of all five boroughs of New York. They visited and explored the city; Bellevue Hospital at night, a tugboat hauling garbage out to sea, parties, libraries, and Puerto Rican markets. They spoke to everyday people to see how they lived their lives and what made the city tick. The result of this collaborative effort was the book Twice Over Lightly, published in 1972.

It is unclear when or by whom Hayes was called the "First Lady of the Theatre". Her friend, actress Katharine Cornell, also held that title, and each thought the other deserved it. One critic said Cornell played every queen as though she were a woman, whereas Hayes played every woman as though she were a queen.

Hayes was also recognized with additional awards during her career. In January 1968, Philadelphia Art Alliance president Raymond S. Green presented her with the alliance's Award of Merit "in recognition of outstanding creative work of high artistic merit." She had been chosen unanimously by the alliance's drama committee and board of directors, according to alliance executive director James Kirk Merrick who noted, "This award isn't given every year.... It is only presented when we feel someone is deserving. I don't think there can be any question as to how we arrived at choosing Miss Hayes."

In 1982, with friend Lady Bird Johnson, she founded the National Wildflower Research Center, now the Lady Bird Johnson Wildflower Center, in Austin, Texas. The center protects and preserves North America's native plants and natural landscapes.

The Helen Hayes Award for theater in the Washington, D.C., area is named in her honor. She has a star on the Hollywood Walk of Fame at 6220 Hollywood Blvd. Hayes is also in the American Theatre Hall of Fame.

== Personal life ==
Hayes was a Catholic and a Republican who attended many Republican National Conventions (including the one held in New Orleans in 1988), but she was not as politically vocal as several other Republicans (e.g., Adolphe Menjou, Ginger Rogers, John Wayne, Ronald Reagan, etc.) in the Hollywood community of that time.

Hayes delivered a seconding speech to George H. W. Bush's nomination during the roll call at the 1988 Republican National Convention.

Hayes wrote three memoirs: A Gift of Joy, On Reflection, and My Life in Three Acts. Some of these books' themes include her return to Roman Catholicism (she had been denied communion from the Church for the duration of her marriage to Charles MacArthur, who was a divorced Protestant); and the polio-related death of her 19-year-old daughter, Mary (1930–1949), an aspiring actress. Hayes's adopted son, James MacArthur (1937–2010), had a successful career in acting, including as co-star to Jack Lord in Hawaii Five-O. Hayes guest-starred on Hawaii Five-O in the 1975 episode "Retire in Sunny Hawaii... Forever". She and her son appeared in The Love Boat episode "No Girls for Doc/Marriage of Convenience/The Caller/The Witness".

Hayes was hospitalized a number of times for asthma, which was aggravated by stage dust, forcing her to retire from theater in 1971, at age 71.

Her last Broadway show was a 1970 revival of Harvey, in which she co-starred with James Stewart. Clive Barnes wrote, "She epitomizes flustered charm almost as if it were a style of acting ... She is one of those actors ... where to watch how she is doing something is almost as pleasurable as what she is doing." She spent most of her last years writing and raising money for organizations that fight asthma.

== Philanthropy ==
Riverside Shakespeare Company Shakespeare Center Dedication with Helen Hayes, 1982

Hayes was a generous donor of time and money to a number of causes and organizations, including the Riverside Shakespeare Company of New York City. Along with Mildred Natwick, she became a founding member of the company's Board of Advisors in 1981. She was also on the board of directors for the Greater New York Council of the Girl Scouts of the USA during the early 1970s.

In 1982, Hayes dedicated Riverside's The Shakespeare Center with New York theatre producer, Joseph Papp, and in 1985 she returned to the New York stage in a benefit for the company with a reading of A Christmas Carol with Raul Julia, Len Cariou, Mary Elizabeth Mastrantonio, Carole Shelley, Celeste Holm and Harold Scott, directed by W. Stuart McDowell. The next year Hayes performed a second benefit for the Riverside Shakespeare Company, this time at the Marquis Theatre, the construction of which had been made possible by the demolition of the Helen Hayes Theatre three years before. The production featured Rex Smith, Ossie Davis and F. Murray Abraham, and was produced by McDowell and directed by Robert Small, with Hayes narrating.

== Helen Hayes Hospital ==
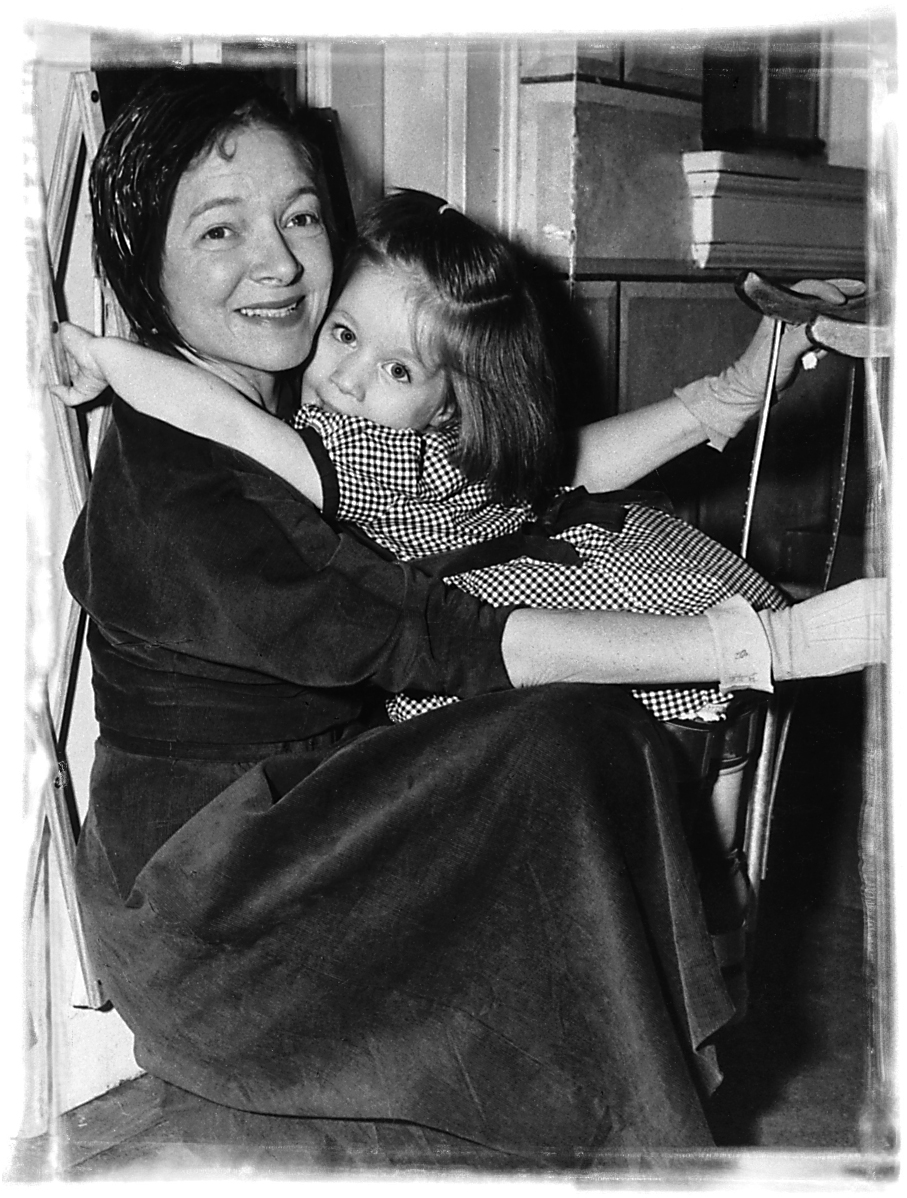
Hayes and a young patient at Helen Hayes Hospital 1945

According to her daughter-in-law, HB MacArthur, Hayes took the most pride in her philanthropic work with Helen Hayes Hospital, a physical rehabilitation hospital located in West Haverstraw, New York. She was extremely proud of the strides the hospital made toward the rehabilitation of people with disabilities, saying: "I've seen my name in lights on theater marquees and in letters 20 feet tall on Broadway billboards, but nothing has ever given me greater sense of pride and satisfaction than my 49-year association with this unique hospital."

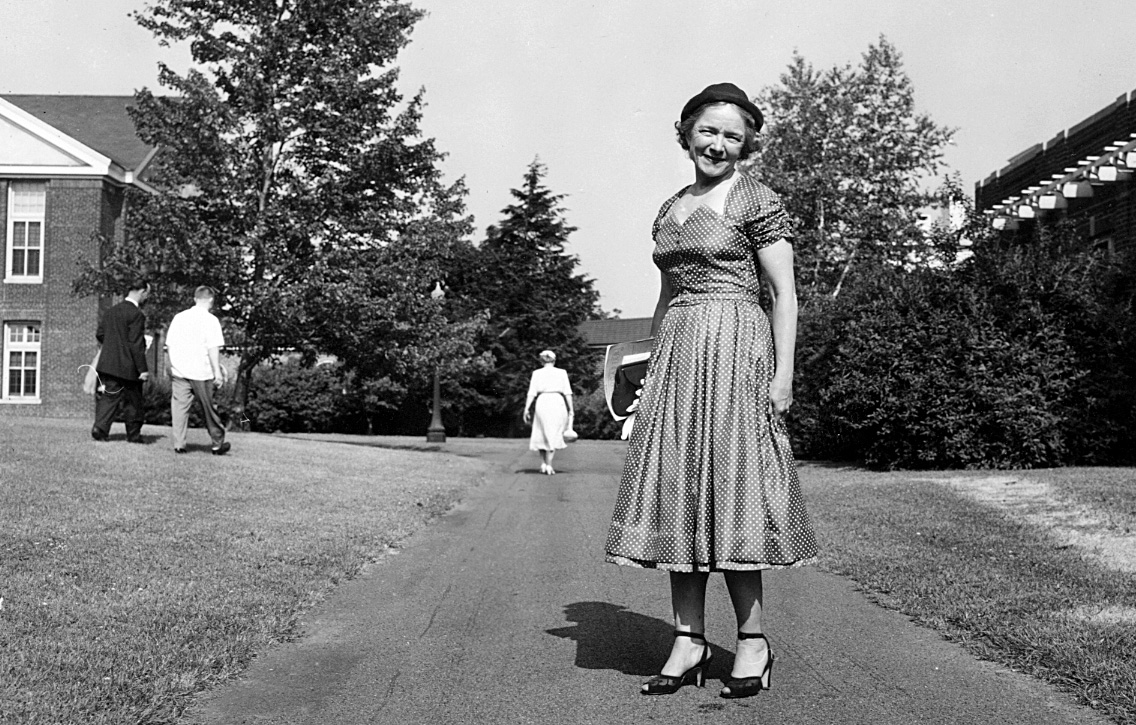
Hayes at Helen Hayes Hospital in the 1950s

Hayes became involved with the hospital in the 1940s and was named to the Board of Visitors in 1944. In 1974, the hospital was renamed in her honor. She served on the Helen Hayes Hospital Board of Visitors for 49 years, until her death in 1993. In that time, she advocated tirelessly for the hospital and successfully led a fight to prevent its relocation to Albany in the 1960s. In the 1970s, she was instrumental in lobbying for funding to transform the hospital into a state-of-the-art facility.

Hayes also contributed her enthusiastic support to hospital events and fund-raising efforts, including handing out diplomas to the children upon graduation when the hospital was still a pediatric care facility. She also faithfully attended the hospital's annual Classic Race, leading it in a classic car, handing out awards to runners, hand cyclists, and wheelchair racers, and offering the use of her home, Pretty Penny, for a dinner to launch the hospital's endowment fund.

== Death ==
Hayes died on March 17, 1993, of congestive heart failure in Nyack, New York. Hayes's will, prepared in 1986, left the bulk of her estate to James MacArthur. Hayes was interred in Oak Hill Cemetery in Nyack In 2011, she was honored on a US postage stamp.

== Acting credits ==
=== Theatre ===
Year	Production	Role	Notes
1905	Miss Hawke's May Ball	Irish Dancer	
1905	A Midsummer Night's Dream	Peaseblossom	Revival
1908	Babe in the Woods	Boy babe	
1909	Jack the Giant Killer	Gibson Girl, Nell Brinkley, Girl impersonators	
1909	A Royal Family	Prince Charles Ferdinand	Revival
1909	Children's Dancing Kermess	Impersonation of "The Nell Brinkley Girl"	
1909	The Prince Chap	Claudia, Age 5	
1909	A Poor Relation	Patch	
1910	Old Dutch	Little Mime	
1910	The Summer Widowers	Pacyche Finnegan, Pinkie's playmate	
1911	The Barrier	Molly, an Alaskan Child	
1911	Little Lord Fauntleroy	Cedric Errol	Revival
1911	The Never Homes	Fannie Hicks, Another Near Orphan	
1911	The Seven Sisters	Klara, the Youngest Daughter	Revival
1911	Mary Jane's Pa		Revival
1912	The June Bride	The Holder's Child	
1913	Flood Victim's Benefit		
1913	The Girl with Green Eyes	Susie, the Flower Girl	
1913	His House in Order	Derek Jesson, his son	Revival
1913	A Royal Family	Prince Charles Ferdinand	Revival
1913	The Prince Chap		Revival
1913	The Prince and the Pauper	Tom Canty and Edward, Prince of Wales	
1914	The Prodigal Husband	Young Simone	
1916	The Dummy	Beryl Meredith, the Kidnapper's Hostage	
1916	On Trial	His Daughter, Doris Strickland	
1917	It Pays to Advertise	Marie, Maid at the Martins	Revival
1917	Romance	Suzette	
1917	Just a Woman	Hired girl	Revival
1917	Mile-a-Minute Kendall	Beth	
1917	Rich Man, Poor Man	Linda Hurst	Revival
1917	Alma, Where Do You Live?	Germain	Revival
1917	Mrs. Wiggs of the Cabbage Patch	Asia	Revival
1917	Within the Law		Revival
1917	Pollyanna	Pollyanna Whittier, The Glad Girl	Road company
1918	Penrod		
1918	Dear Brutus	Margaret, the dream daughter	American premiere
1919	On the Hiring Line	Dorothy Fessenden, his daughter	
1919	Clarence	Cora Wheeler	
1919	The Golden Age	Mary Anne Simmonds	Tryout; later retitled to Golden Days.
1920	Bab	Barbara "Bab" Archibald	
1921	The Wren	Eusebia "Seeby" Olds	
1921	Golden Days	Mary Anne Simmonds	
1922	To the Ladies	Elsie Beebe	
1922	No Siree!: An Anonymous Entertainment by the Vicious Circus of the Hotel Algonquin		
1923	Loney Lee	Loney Lee	
1924	We Moderns	Mary Sundale, their Daughter	
1924	The Dragon		
1924	She Stoops to Conquer	Constance Neville	Revival
1924	Dancing Mothers	Catherine (Kittens) Westcourt	
1924	Quarantine	Dinah Partlett	
1925	Caesar and Cleopatra	Cleopatra	Revival
1925	The Last of Mrs. Cheyney	Maria	
1925	Young Blood	Georgia Bissell	
1926	What Every Woman Knows	Maggie Wylie	Revival
1927	Coquette	Norma Besant	
1930	Mr. Gilhooley	A girl	
1930	Petticoat Influence	Peggy Chalfont	
1931	The Good Fairy	Lu	
1933	Mary of Scotland	Mary Stuart	
1935	Caesar and Cleopatra	Cleopatra	Revival
1935	Victoria Regina	Victoria	
1934	What Every Woman Knows		Revival
1936	Victoria Regina	Victoria	Revival
1938	The Merchant of Venice	Portia	Revival
1938	Victoria Regina	Victoria	Revival
1939	Ladies and Gentlemen	Miss Terry Scott	
1940	Twelfth Night	Viola	Revival
1941	Candle in the Wind	Madeline Guest	
1943	Harriet	Harriet Beecher Stowe	
1944	Harriet	Harriet Beecher Stowe	Revival
1947	Alice Sit-by-the-Fire	Mrs. Alice Grey	
1947	Happy Birthday	Addie	
1948	The Glass Menagerie	Amanda Wingfield	Revival
1949	Good Housekeeping		
1950	The Wisteria Trees	Lucy Andree Ransdell	
1952	Mrs. McThing	Mrs. Howard V. Larue III	
1955	Gentleman, The Queens	Catherine, Lady Macbeth, Mary and Queen Victoria	
1955	The Skin of Our Teeth	Mrs. Antrobus	Revival
1956	Lovers, Villains and Fools	Narrator, Puck, and the Chorus from Henry V	
1956	The Glass Menagerie	Amanda Wingfield	Revival
1958	Time Remembered	The Duchess of Pont-Au-Bronc	revival
1958	An Adventure	Lulu Spencer	
1958	Mid-Summer	Rose, the Maid	Revival
1958	A Touch of the Poet	Nora Melody	
1960	The Cherry Orchard	Lyuboff Ranevskaya	Revival
1960	The Chalk Garden	Mrs. St. Maugham	Revival
1962	Shakespeare Revisited: A Program for Two Players		
1964	Good Morning Miss Dove	Miss Lucerna Dove	
1964	The White House	Abigail Adams, Dolley Madison, Edith Wilson, Julia Grant; Leonora Clayton, Mary Todd Lincoln, Mrs. Benjamin Harrison, Mrs. Franklin Pierce, Frances Folsom Cleveland Preston, Mrs. James G. Blaine, Mrs. Theodore Roosevelt, Rachel Jackson	
1965	Helen Hayes' Tour of the Far East		
1966	The Circle		Revival
1966	The School for Scandal	Mrs. Candour	Revival
1966	Right You Are If You Think You Are	Signora Frola	Revival
1966	We Comrades Three	Mother	
1966	You Can't Take It with You	Olga	Revival
1967	The Show-Off	Mrs. Fisher	
1968	The Show-Off	Mrs. Fisher	return engagement (revival)
1969	The Front Page	Mrs. Grant	Revival
1970	Harvey	Veta Louise Simmons	(Revival)
1971	Long Day's Journey Into Night	Mary Cavan Tyrone	Revival

=== Film ===
Year	Film	Role	Notes
1910	Jean and the Calico Doll and one subsequent Vitagraph film	Juvenile lead	
1917	The Weavers of Life	Peggy	
1928	The Dancing Town	Olive Pepperall	Short subject
1931	The Sin of Madelon Claudet	Madelon Claudet	Academy Award for Best Actress; Volpi Cup for Best Actress
1931	Arrowsmith	Leora Arrowsmith	
1932	A Farewell to Arms	Catherine Barkley	
1932	The Son-Daughter	Lian Wha 'Star Blossom'	
1933	The White Sister	Angela Chiaromonte	
1933	Another Language	Stella 'Stell' Hallam	
1933	Night Flight	Madame Fabian	
1934	Crime Without Passion	Extra in hotel lobby	Uncredited
1934	This Side of Heaven	Actress on screen in theatre	Uncredited
1934	What Every Woman Knows	Maggie Wylie	
1935	Vanessa: Her Love Story	Vanessa Paris	
1938	Hollywood Goes to Town	Herself, uncredited	Short subject
1943	Stage Door Canteen	Herself	
1952	My Son John	Lucille Jefferson	
1953	Main Street to Broadway	Herself	
1956	Anastasia	Dowager Empress Maria Feodorovna	Nomination- Golden Globe Award for Best Actress in a Motion Picture – Drama
1959	Third Man on the Mountain	Tourist	Uncredited
1961	The Challenge of Ideas	Narrator	Short subject
1970	Airport	Ada Quonsett	Academy Award for Best Supporting Actress
1974	Herbie Rides Again	Mrs. Steinmetz	Nomination - Golden Globe Award for Best Actress – Motion Picture Comedy or Musical
1975	One of Our Dinosaurs Is Missing	Hettie	
1977	Candleshoe	Lady Gwendolyn St. Edmund	
1987	Divine Mercy: No Escape	Narrator	Final film role

=== Television ===
Year	Title	Role	Notes
1950
1950	Prudential Family Playhouse	Elizabeth Moulton-Barrett	The Barretts of Wimpole Street
1950	Pulitzer Prize Playhouse	Gwenny Bean	The Late Christopher Bean
1951	Pulitzer Prize Playhouse	Mary Stuart, Queen of Scots	Mary of Scotland
1951	Schlitz Playhouse of Stars	Honora Canderay	Dark Fleece
1951	Schlitz Playhouse of Stars		The Lucky Touch
1951	Schlitz Playhouse of Stars		Not a Chance
1951	Robert Montgomery Presents	Queen Victoria	Victoria Regina
1952	Omnibus		The Twelve Pound Look
1953	Omnibus	Mrs. Kirby	The Happy Journey
1953	Omnibus	Mom	Mom and Leo
1953	Medallion Theatre	Harriet Beecher Stowe	"Battle Hymn"
1954	The United States Steel Hour	Mrs. Austin	Welcome Home
1954	The Best of Broadway	Fanny Cavendish	The Royal Family
1954	The Motorola Television Hour	Frances Parry	Side by Side
1955	Producers' Showcase	Margaret Antrobus	The Skin of Our Teeth
1955	The Best of Broadway	Abby Brewster	Arsenic and Old Lace
1956	Omnibus	Mrs. Dearth	Dear Brutus
1956	Omnibus	Bessie Arlington	Episode: "The Christmas Tie"
1957	The Alcoa Hour	Mrs. Gilling	Episode: "Mrs. Gilling and the Skyscraper"
1957	Playhouse 90	Sister Theresa	Four Women in Black
1958	Omnibus	Mrs. Howard V. Larue III	Episode: "Mrs. McThing"
1958	The United States Steel Hour	Mother Seraphim	Episode: "One Red Rose for Christmas"
1959	Hallmark Hall of Fame	Essie Miller	Ah, Wilderness!
1959	Play of the Week	Madame Ranevskaya	The Cherry Orchard
1960	The Bell Telephone Hour	Baroness Nadedja von Meck	The Music of Romance
1960	Play of the Week	Mother Hildebrand	The Velvet Glove
1960	Dow Hour of Great Mysteries	Letitia Van Gorder	The Bat by Mary Roberts Rinehart and Avery Hopwood
1963	The Christophers		What One Bootmaker Did
1967	Tarzan	Mrs. Wilson	The Pride of the Lioness
1969	Arsenic and Old Lace	Abby Brewster	TV movie
1970	The Front Page	Narrator (voice)	TV movie
1971	Do Not Fold, Spindle or Mutilate	Sophie Tate Curtis	TV movie
1972	Harvey	Veta Louise Simmons	TV movie
1972	Here's Lucy	Mrs. Kathleen Brady	Episode: "Lucy and the Little Old Lady"
1972	Ghost Story	Miss Gilden	Episode: "Alter-Ego"
1973–1974	The Snoop Sisters	Ernesta Snoop	TV series (5 episodes)
1975	Hawaii Five-O	Clara Williams	Episode: "Retire in Sunny Hawaii... Forever"
1976	The Moneychangers	Dr. McCartney	TV miniseries
1976	Victory at Entebbe	Etta Grossman-Wise	TV movie
1978	A Family Upside Down	Emma Long	TV movie
1980	The Love Boat	Agatha Winslow	Episode: No Girls for Doc/Marriage of Convenience/The Caller/The Witness"
1982	Love, Sidney	Mrs. Clovis	Episode: "Pro and Cons"
1982	Murder Is Easy	Lavinia Fullerton	TV movie
1983	A Caribbean Mystery	Miss Jane Marple	TV movie
1984	Highway to Heaven	Estelle Wicks	Episode: "Highway to Heaven: Part 1 & 2"
1985	Murder with Mirrors	Miss Jane Marple	TV movie

== Awards and honors ==
Year	Award	Category	Nominated work	Result	Ref.
1931	Academy Awards	Best Actress	The Sin of Madelon Claudet	Won	
1970	Academy Awards	Best Supporting Actress	Airport	Won	
1956	Golden Globe Awards	Best Actress in a Motion Picture – Drama	Anastasia	Nominated	
1974	Golden Globe Awards	Best Actress – Motion Picture Comedy or Musical	Herbie Rides Again	Nominated	
1977	Grammy Awards	Best Spoken Word Album	Great American Documents	Won	
1980	Grammy Awards	Best Spoken Word Album	Orson Welles & Helen Hayes at Their Best	Nominated	
1951	Primetime Emmy Awards	Best Actress		Nominated	
1952	Primetime Emmy Awards	Best Actress		Nominated	
1953	Primetime Emmy Awards	Best Actress		Won	
1958	Primetime Emmy Awards	Best Single Performance by an Actress	The Alcoa Hour	Nominated	
1959	Primetime Emmy Awards	Best Single Performance by an Actress	The United States Steel Hour	Nominated	
1972	Primetime Emmy Awards	Best Single Performance by an Actress	Do Not Fold, Spindle or Mutilate	Nominated	
1974	Primetime Emmy Awards	Best Actress in a Limited Series	The Snoop Sisters	Nominated	
1976	Primetime Emmy Awards	Outstanding Single Appearance in a Drama or Comedy Series	Hawaii Five-O	Nominated	
1978	Primetime Emmy Awards	Outstanding Lead Actress in a Drama or Comedy Special	A Family Upside Down	Nominated	
1947	Tony Awards	Best Actress in a Play	Happy Birthday	Won	
1958	Tony Awards	Best Actress in a Play	Time Remembered	Won	
1970	Tony Awards	Best Actress in a Play	Harvey	Nominated	
1980	Tony Awards	Lawrence Langer Award		Received	

Brandeis University granted Hayes an honorary doctorate in 1964.

Hayes was in the inaugural class of inductees to the American Theater Hall of Fame in 1972.

In 1972, she received the Golden Plate Award of the American Academy of Achievement. The following year, in 1973, Hayes was inducted into the National Women's Hall of Fame. In 1979, the Supersisters trading card set was produced and distributed; one of the cards featured Hayes's name and picture. In 1983, Hayes received the Award for Greatest Public Service Benefiting the Disadvantaged, an award given out annually by Jefferson Awards. In 1979, she received the Laetare Medal from the University of Notre Dame.

== See also ==
- List of persons who have won Academy, Emmy, Grammy, and Tony Awards
- List of actors with two or more Academy Awards in acting categories
- List of people from Morelos

== Bibliography ==
- Mosel, Tad and Macy, Gertrude. Leading Lady: The World and Theatre of Katharine Cornell(1978), Little, Brown & Co, Boston, ISBN 0-316-58537-8
- Murphy, Donn B. and Moore, Stephen. Helen Hayes; A Bio-Bibliography (1993)
- Kennedy, Harold J. No Pickle, No Performance. An Irreverent Theatrical Excursion from Tallulah to Travolta, Doubleday & Co. (1978)
