= Clarence (1937 film) =

1937 film by George Archainbaud

- Theatrical release poster
- Directed by: George Archainbaud
- Screenplay by: Grant Garett; Seena Owen
- Based on: Clarence by Booth Tarkington
- Produced by: Paul Jones
- Starring: Roscoe Karns; Eleanore Whitney; Eugene Pallette; Johnny Downs; Inez Courtney; Charlotte Wynters
- Cinematography: George T. Clemens
- Edited by: Arthur P. Schmidt
- Music by: Sigmund Krumgold
- Production company: Paramount Pictures
- Distributed by: Paramount Pictures
- Release date: February 12, 1937
- Running time: 64 minutes
- Country: United States
- Language: English

Clarence is a 1937 American comedy film directed by George Archainbaud and written by Grant Garett and Seena Owen. The film stars Roscoe Karns, Eleanore Whitney, Eugene Pallette, Johnny Downs, Inez Courtney and Charlotte Wynters. It is based on the play Clarence by Booth Tarkington. The film was released on February 12, 1937, by Paramount Pictures.

== Plot ==
Mistaken for a cab driver, Clarence Smith good-naturedly drives Mr. Wheeler home, where he promptly offers his services as a handyman who can fix just about anything. The Wheeler family gets to know Clarence and trust him with their secrets, like Wheeler's son Bobbie being in love with girlfriend Violet while being blackmailed by housemaid Della.

Wheeler's lovely daughter, Cora, has an older beau named Tobias whom her dad dislikes. Tobias plants thoughts in the family's heads that Clarence is a con man, out to swindle them. But not only does Clarence convince everyone of his honorable intentions, he wins Cora's heart as well.

== Cast ==
- Roscoe Karns as Clarence Smith
- Eleanore Whitney as Cora Wheeler
- Eugene Pallette as Mr. Wheeler
- Johnny Downs as Bobbie
- Inez Courtney as Della
- Charlotte Wynters as Violet
- Spring Byington as Mrs. Wheeler
- Theodore von Eltz as Tobias
- Richard Powell as Dinwiddie
