= Clarence (1922 film) =

1922 film

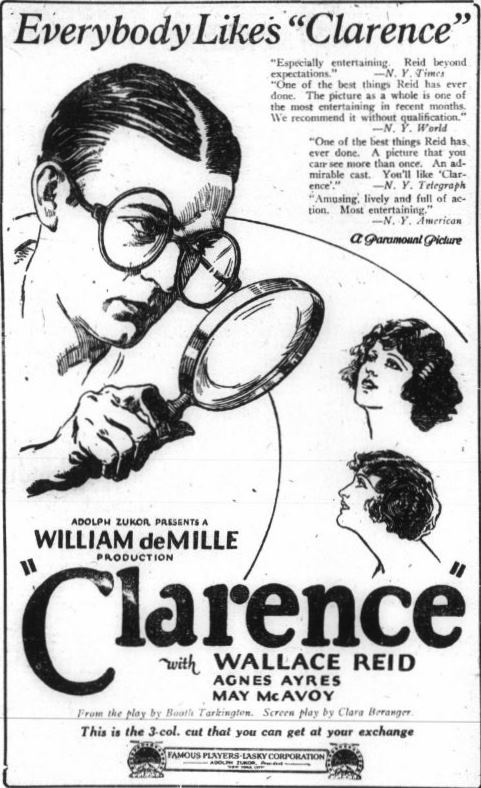
- Poster for the film from a newspaper.
- Directed by: William C. deMille
- Written by: Clara Beranger (adaptation & scenario)
- Based on: Clarence by Booth Tarkington
- Produced by: Adolph Zukor; Jesse L. Lasky
- Starring: Wallace Reid; Agnes Ayres
- Cinematography: L. Guy Wilky
- Distributed by: Paramount Pictures
- Release dates: October 15, 1922 (New York); November 19, 1922 (US)
- Running time: 7 reels; (6,146 feet)
- Country: United States
- Language: Silent (English intertitles)

Clarence is a 1922 American silent comedy drama, based on the 1919 play by Booth Tarkington, produced by Famous Players–Lasky and distributed through Paramount Pictures. It was directed by William C. deMille and starred Wallace Reid in his penultimate screen appearance.

== Plot ==
The father of a quirky family, the Wheelers, hires an ex-soldier, Clarence, as a handyman. Clarence falls for the family's governess, Violet.

Mrs. Wheeler suspects that Violet and her husband are carrying on, and Mrs. Wheeler begins to develop an attraction to Clarence. Hubert Stem, Mr. Wheeler's avaricious private secretary, one day shows Mr. Wheeler an article about Charles Short, an army deserter, and insists that Clarence is in actuality Charles Short.

== Cast ==
- Wallace Reid as Clarence Smith
- Agnes Ayres as Violet Pinney
- May McAvoy as Cora Wheeler
- Kathlyn Williams as Mrs. Wheeler
- Edward Martindel as Mr. Wheeler
- Robert Agnew as Bobby Wheeler
- Adolphe Menjou as Hubert Stem
- Bertram Johns as Dinwiddie
- Dorothy Gordon as Della
- Mayme Kelso as Mrs. Martin

== Preservation ==
With no prints of Clarence located in any film archives, it is considered a lost film.

== See also ==
- List of lost films
- Wallace Reid filmography
