= Helen Hayes Hospital =

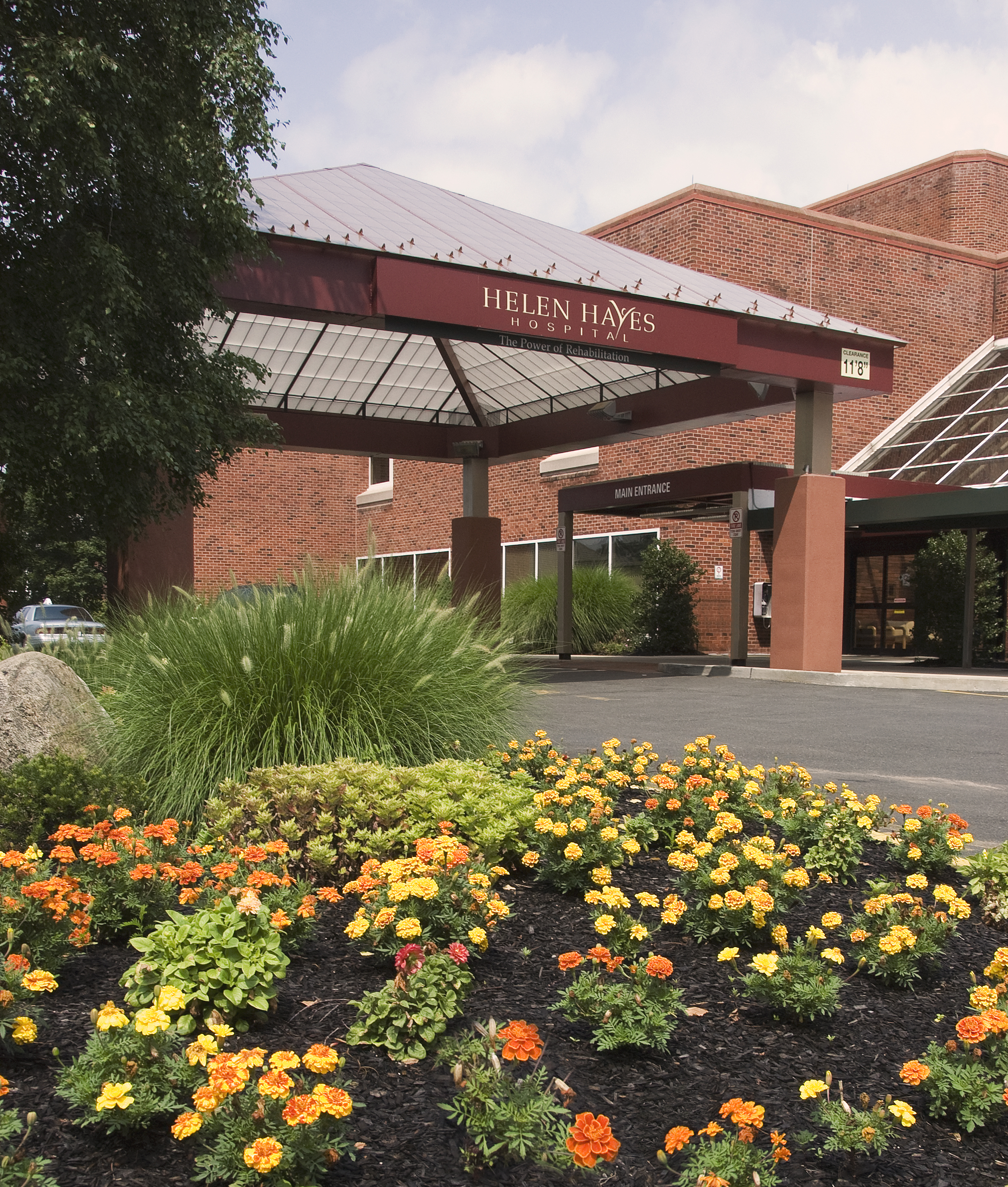

Geography
- Location: West Haverstraw, New York, United States
- Coordinates: 41.2140°N 73.9882°W

Organization
- Care system: Physical medicine and rehabilitation
- Type: Nonprofit organization

Services
- Beds: 155

History
- Opened: 1900

Links
- Website: helenhayeshospital.org
- Lists: Hospitals in New York State

Helen Hayes Hospital is a 155-bed physical rehabilitation hospital in West Haverstraw, New York, owned and operated by the New York State Department of Health. Established by Dr. Newton Schaffer in 1900 as a physical rehabilitation hospital for children, it is considered to be one of the first freestanding state-operated physical rehabilitation hospitals in the United States. The hospital was renamed in 1974 after celebrated stage and screen actress Helen Hayes MacArthur, who served on the hospital's Board of Visitors for 49 years until her death in 1993. The hospital is a member of the New York-Presbyterian Healthcare System.

The modern hospital provides rehabilitation on an inpatient and outpatient basis for individuals of all ages with a wide array of disabilities and conditions, including spinal cord injury, stroke, traumatic brain injury, cardiac and pulmonary disorders, amputations, joint replacements, osteoporosis, Parkinson's disease, multiple sclerosis, ALS, cerebral palsy and other neurological disorders. The hospital also provides pediatric rehabilitation for children with physical and cognitive disabilities and developmental delays.

Helen Hayes Hospital is also home to The Center for Rehabilitation Technology, a center for advanced adaptive technology, and the Smart Apartment, a working replica of a home outfitted with adaptive technology for home life.

== History ==
The hospital, established in 1900 by Dr. Newton M. Shaffer, was originally called the New York State Hospital for the Care of Indigent Crippled and Deformed Children. Located at first In a commodious house on the banks of the Hudson River in Tarrytown, it was one of the first state-run, freestanding rehabilitation hospitals in the US. The facility opened its doors to patients on December 5, 1900, offering services to children aged 3 to 15 who were residents of New York State and whose parents were unable to pay for private treatment. The hospital originally had accommodations for 25-30 children; they lived full-time at the facility while receiving treatment. Admission to the hospital was in high demand among poor families who had children suffering from spinal disease, hip-joint diseases, infantile paralysis, and other conditions.

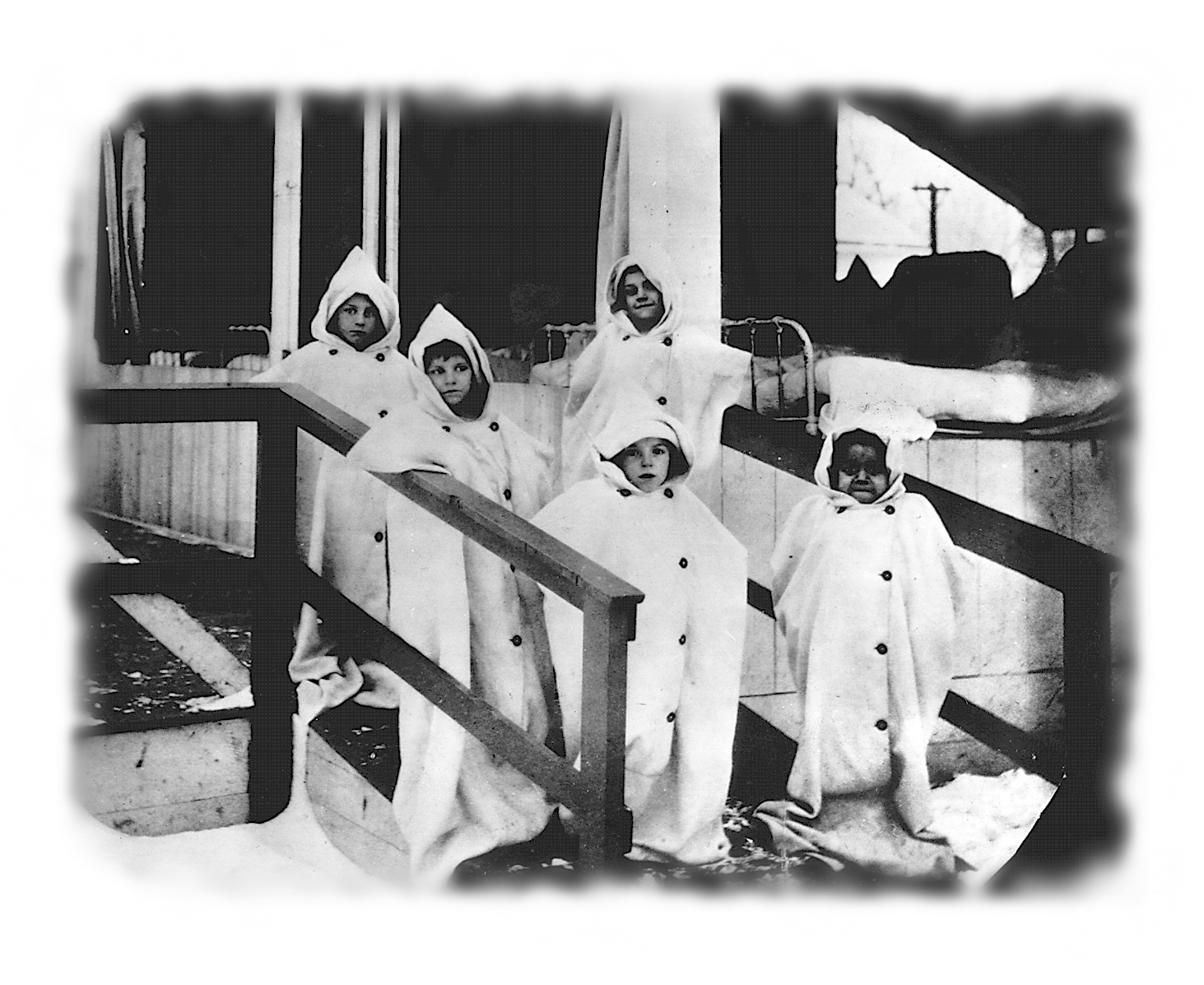
Children treated for tuberculosis in outdoor shelters at Helen Hayes Hospital, 1920s

In April 1905, the hospital was relocated to another building with views of the Hudson River, in West Haverstraw, Rockland County. The new building housed and cared for approximately 50 children.

During the 1923 polio epidemic, the hospital was renamed The New York State Orthopedic Hospital for Children and in 1929, it became the New York State Reconstruction Home. In 1945, during World War II, the hospital lifted its age restrictions and began to admit patients over the age of 21.

Three more name changes would occur in the coming years—to “New York State Rehabilitation Hospital” in 1948 and to “New York State Rehabilitation and Research Hospital” in 1972, and finally, in 1974, to “Helen Hayes Hospital” in honor of Helen Hayes, the actress of stage and screen, who had devoted much time and money to the institution.
