= Clarence (play) =

1919 play by Booth Tarkington

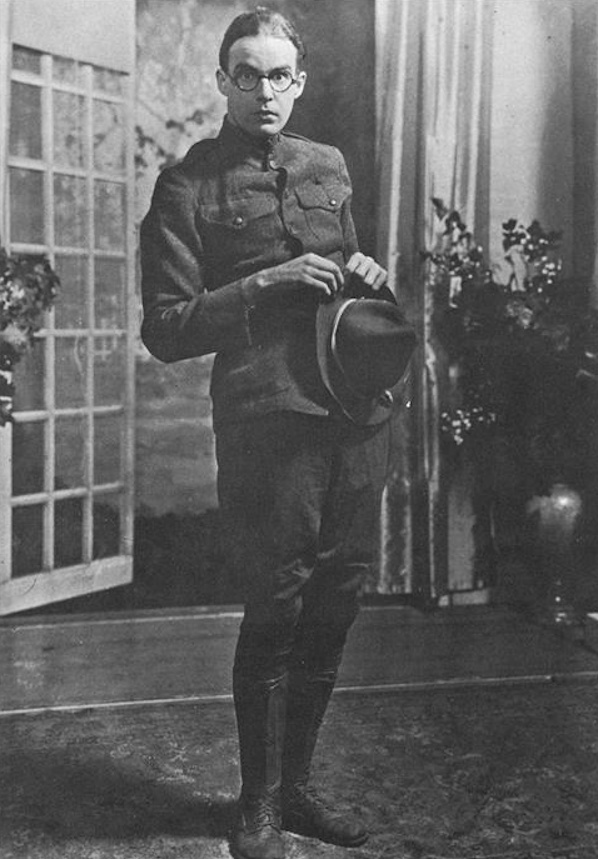
- Alfred Lunt (1919)
- Original language: English
- Written by: Booth Tarkington
- Subject: Discharged soldier mends problems
- Genre: Comedy
- Setting: Mr. Wheeler's office in New York, and his home in Englewood, New Jersey

Premiere
- Date: September 20, 1919
- Place: Hudson Theatre
- Directed by: Frederick Stanhope

Clarence is a 1919 play by Booth Tarkington. It is a four-act comedy with two settings and eleven characters. The story concerns an ailing recently discharged soldier who is given a handyman job by a financial tycoon because he has overheard family gossip in the tycoon's waiting room. Tarkington wrote the play with Alfred Lunt in mind, after having seen him perform in his earlier work, The Country Cousin.

The play was first produced by George C. Tyler, staged by Frederick Stanhope, and starred Lunt with Elsie MacKay, Helen Hayes, and Glen Hunter in support. It had a one-week tryout in Atlantic City during July 1919, before it premiered on Broadway during September 1919 and ran through June 1920 for 323 performances. It was the breakout role for Alfred Lunt, establishing him as a Broadway star, and for Tarkington provided proof he could write a critically successful play. For the 19-year-old Helen Hayes it was another acclaimed step in her ascent to becoming the "First Lady of American Theatre".

While still in its Broadway run, a second company for Clarence was launched in Chicago during January 1920 by producer Tyler. The play was never revived on Broadway, but was adapted for a 1922 silent film and a 1937 sound movie.

== Characters ==
Characters are listed in order of appearance within their scope.

Lead

- Clarence is a spectacle-wearing soldier, recently given a medical discharge from the Army.
- Bobby Wheeler is 16, son of Mr. Wheeler by his first wife, expelled from the finest private schools.
- Cora Wheeler is 17, flapper daughter of Mr. Wheeler by his first wife, infatuated with Hubert Stem.

Supporting

- Mr. Wheeler is in his fifties; he controls his financial investment firm but not his family.
- Mrs. Wheeler is in her thirties, Mr. Wheeler's jealous second wife.
- Violet Pinney is in her mid-twenties, tutor and chaperone-governess to Cora Wheeler.

Featured

- Mrs. Martyn is Mr. Wheeler's efficient confidential secretary at his New York offices.
- Della is an attractive Irish-American maid, who will not let Bobby trifle with her.
- Dinnwiddie is man-servant to Mr. Wheeler; he has broken with Della after seeing her kissed by Bobby.
- Hubert Stem is 26, a grass widower who dates Cora but is really after Miss Pinney.

Voice Only

- Rosie is an older Irish-American maid at the Wheeler home, heard speaking to Della in Act II.

== Synopsis ==
A great deal of the dialogue centers on Clarence's mysterious background, which comes out bit by bit. Even his surname isn't known until late in the play.

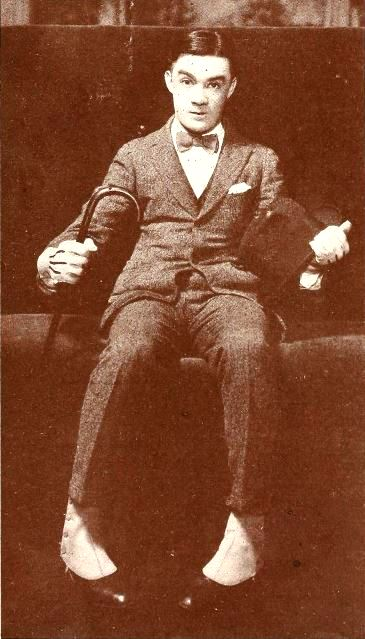
Glenn Hunter as Bobby

Act I (The anteroom of Mr. Wheeler's private office, New York.) Mrs. Martyn suggests Mr. Wheeler might want to see a young soldier in the waiting room. At first Mr. Wheeler demurs, but as his wife, son, daughter, and daughter's governess parade through the waiting room baying out their complaints, he realizes it might be politic to offer the young doughboy a job to keep him quiet. Mr. Wheeler is impressed that Clarence could drive mules in the Army without learning to swear, (Note: A mistaken impression by Cora and Bobby, who didn't realize Clarence meant he already knew how to swear.) thinking this may be the fellow to ride herd on his family. Mrs. Martyn, unable to hear Clarence through Cora's chattering, has recorded his surname as "Smun". All that the family knows about the plainly ailing Clarence is that he was discharged for his liver. (Curtain)

Act II (Living room of Mr. Wheeler's home, Englewood, New Jersey. Daytime, three weeks later) Clarence now acts as general handyman at the Wheeler home, as well as secretary to Mr. Wheeler, since he is plainly well educated. He has grown healthier and stands straight, but still wears his uniform for lack of civilian clothes. Della and Rosie admire his husband potential, while Dinwiddie can't decide whether Clarence is domestic staff or a professional man. Violet is beset with suitors: first Bobby, then Hubert Stem, and now Clarence who shyly seeks her company. Cora is distraught when she learns Hubert was using her as a stalking horse to draw the protective Violet to him. Clarence frustrates Hubert's attempt to woo Violet then calms Mrs. Wheeler's unwarranted jealousy over Mr. Wheeler and Violet. But Violet doesn't want Clarence to pursue her, and requests he keep his distance. Della has now abandoned her designs on Bobby and switched to Clarence, as does Cora. When Clarence's army backpay arrives, he buys a new suit and used saxophone, and leads Cora and Dinwiddie into an impromptu parade. (Curtain)

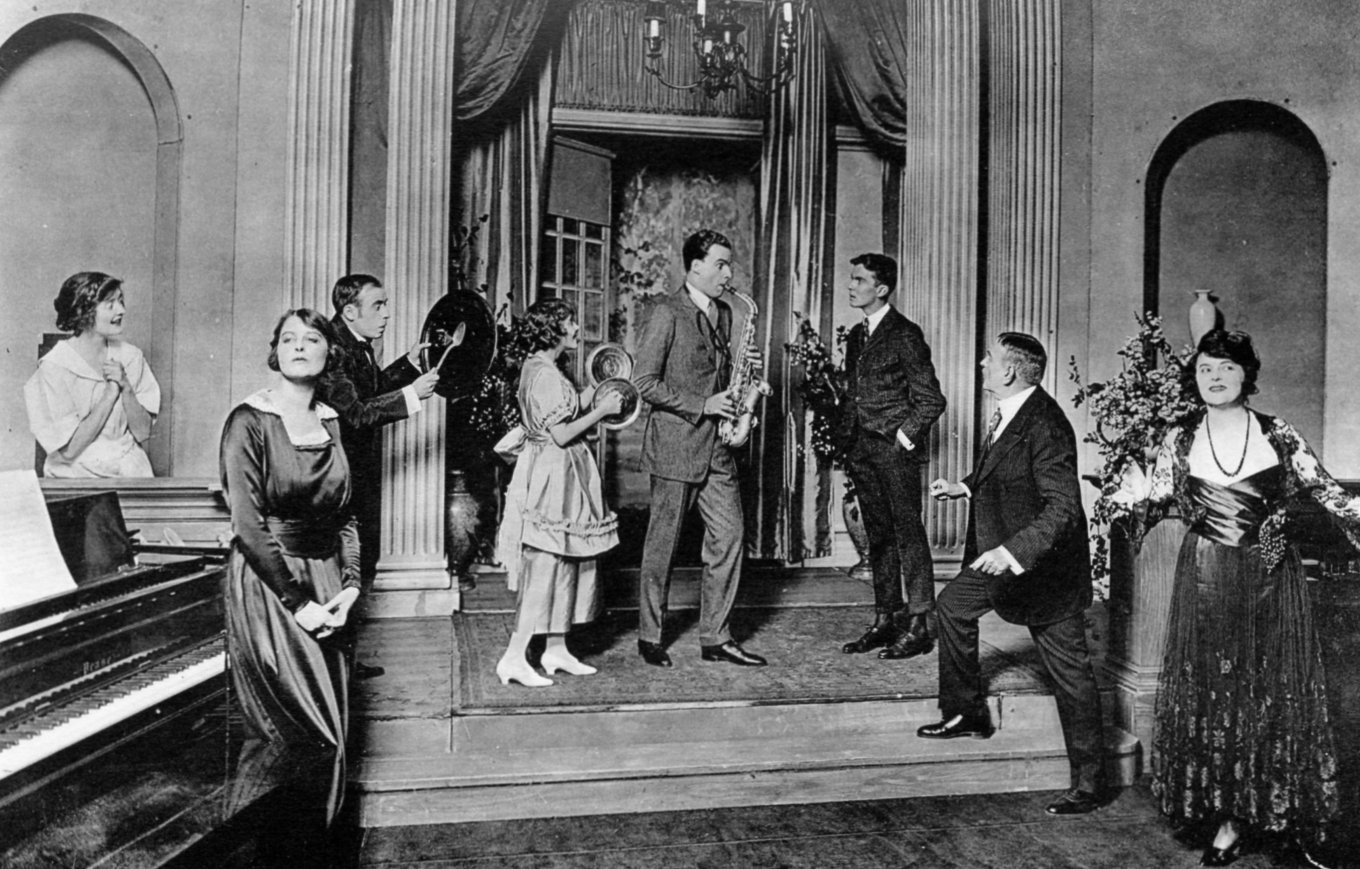

Act III (Same, that evening.) Della spars with a jealous Dinwiddie, then startles Bobby by comparing him unfavorably to Clarence. She reveals Clarence used to work in a "lavatory". Violet still refuses Clarence's tenative approaches, but is reconciled with Mrs. Wheeler. Cora asks Clarence what was wrong with his liver, to which he replies he was shot in it. "At Château-Thierry?" asks Mrs. Wheeler, to which he answers "During training". Violet, Bobby, and Mr. Wheeler cannot agree on Clarence's last name, offering Moon, Smart, and Smun respectively. Hubert Stem now brings a newspaper clipping about an Army deserter named "Charles Short". Clarence frustrates him by obtuseness, but reacts angrily when accused of being Charles Short. Mr. Wheeler tries to calm him, explaining they know so little about him. Clarence shouts that all you have to do is look him up in Who's Who, as he is the expert on Coleoptera. The situation is defused when Dinwiddie reports a plumbing emergency. Clarence exits to stop the flooding while Mr. Wheeler calls for a dictionary. (Curtain)

Act IV (Same, the next morning.) The Wheeler family bickers after breakfast, Bobby and Cora endlessly sniping and aggravating Mr. Wheeler. Only Mrs. Wheeler remains calm. The crux of the matter is they can't remember the word Clarence told them. They also can't find a Clarence in Who's Who under any of the surnames they thought were his. Clarence explains to Della that he worked in a laboratory, not a lavatory, but she doesn't know the difference. Violet comes down with her suitcase and hat. She is leaving, but is surprised when Clarence says he is too. While they are alone Clarence explains that he is an entomologist, and has re-applied for his old job. He expects a letter that morning confirming the re-appointment. He overwhelms Violet with his confidence in planning their future; she is swept along in the tide. The letter arrives for C. Smith, Esq., provoking astonishment among everyone. The Who's Who is re-consulted and reveals his doctorate and other impressive credentials. Violet and Clarence depart, while the miffed Cora, frustrated in love again, swallows and says softly "Oh, Clarence". (Curtain)

== Original production ==
=== Background ===
Producer George C. Tyler (Note: Since the collapse of Liebler & Company in 1914, Tyler had been working as a semi-independent producer in association with Klaw and Erlanger.) said in his 1934 memoir that Alexandra Carlisle suggested a then unknown Alfred Lunt as her leading man for the second season of Booth Tarkington's The Country Cousin. Lunt had performed a bit role with Romance and Arabella during the Fall of 1917, at the same time as Carlisle was starring in the first season of The Country Cousin on Broadway. Tyler hired Lunt and was impressed. Tarkington caught Lunt's performance in Boston and wired Tyler to retain him, as Tarkington wanted to write a play built around Lunt.

Successful plays had been made by others from Tarkington's novels, such as The Man from Home and Seventeen, but he himself hadn't written a stage work that pleased critics like Alexander Woollcott and Heywood Broun. Both men had previously insisted Tarkington wasn't able to write a good play, despite his literary stature with novels. They pointed to his earlier solo stage efforts such as Mister Antonio and Up From Nowhere as "stale and mechanical", but they publicly recanted with the premiere of Clarence.

=== Cast ===
Principal cast during the Atlantic City tryout and the Broadway run. The production was on hiatus between July 13 and September 19, 1919.
| Role | Actor | Dates | Notes and sources |
|---|---|---|---|
| Clarence | Alfred Lunt | Jul 07, 1919 - Jun 19, 1920 | |
| Bobby Wheeler | Glen Hunter | Sep 20, 1919 - Jun 19, 1920 | |
| Cora Wheeler | Helen Hayes | Sep 20, 1919 - Feb 14, 1920 | Producer Tyler switched Hayes to the lead in a tryout of Bab by Edward Childs Carpenter. |
| Cora Wheeler | Viola Harper | Feb 16, 1920 - Jun 19, 1920 | |
| Mr. Wheeler | George Howell | Jul 07, 1919 - Jul 12, 1919 | |
| Mr. Wheeler | John Flood | Sep 20, 1919 - Jun 19, 1920 | |
| Mrs. Wheeler | Mary Boland | Sep 20, 1919 - Jun 19, 1920 | |
| Violet Pinney | Phoebe Foster | Jul 07, 1919 - Jul 12, 1919 | |
| Violet Pinney | Elsie MacKay | Sep 20, 1919 - Jun 19, 1920 | |
| Mrs. Martyn | Susanne Westford | Sep 20, 1919 - Jun 19, 1920 | |
| Della | Jane Corcoran | Jul 07, 1919 - Jul 12, 1919 | |
| Della | Rea Martin | Sep 20, 1919 - Jun 19, 1920 | |
| Dinwiddie | Frank Connor | Jul 07, 1919 - Jul 12, 1919 | |
| Dinwiddie | Barlowe Borland | Sep 20, 1919 - Jun 19, 1920 | |
| Hubert Stem | Sidney Toler | Jul 07, 1919 - Jul 12, 1919 | |
| Hubert Stem | Willard Barton | Sep 20, 1919 - Jun 19, 1920 | |

=== Tryout ===
Clarence had its first performance at Nixon's Apollo Theatre in Atlantic City, New Jersey, on July 7, 1919. The local reviewer said the audience laughed from start to finish, calling Alfred Lunt "irresistibly funny". They also praised Helen Hayes for her chatterbox schoolgirl, Phoebe Foster as Violet, and George Howell as Mr. Wheeler.

The Boston Globe reported in early August that Clarence was scheduled to open at Boston's Hollis Street Theatre on August 30, 1919. However, Actors' Equity Association went out on strike in August, which wasn't settled until September 6, 1920.

=== Broadway premiere and reception ===
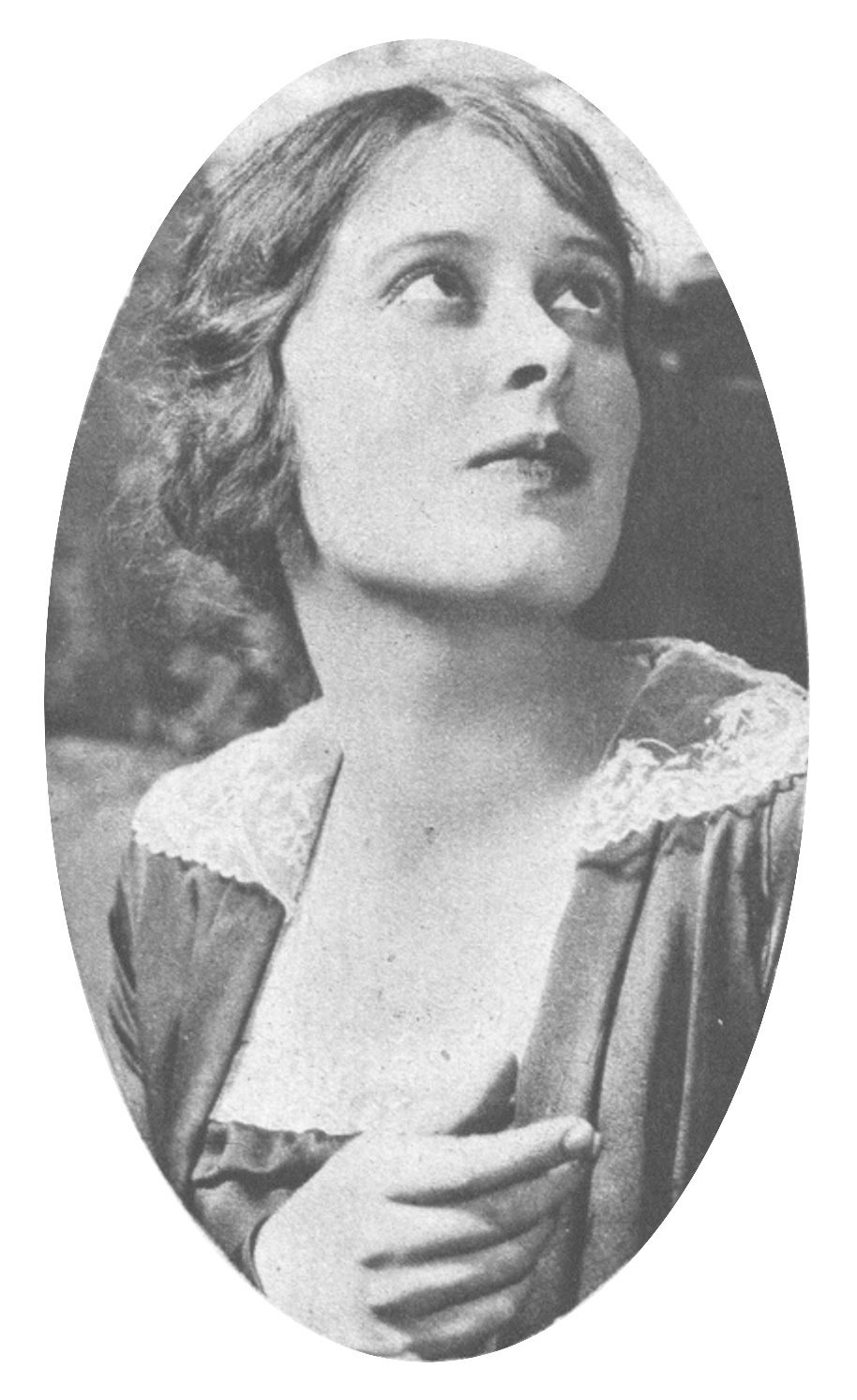
Elsie MacKay

The production premiered in Manhattan with five new cast members on September 20, 1919, at the Hudson Theatre. The New York Herald reviewer reported the "original and whimsical humor" of Tarkington's new play, superior to earlier works like Ramsey Milholland, but felt it "killingly long in its present state". They also identified the characters of Bobby and Cora as central: "...the sluggish action, since this is a Tarkington play arises from two children just emerging into maturity". Heywood Broun, in reversing his earlier skepticism on Tarkington plays, said "Clarence is the best light comedy written by an American." He identified Helen Hayes, Alfred Lunt, and Glenn Hunter as the standout performances in a strong cast, and even praised producer Tyler and director Frederick Stanhope.

Alexander Woollcott said "Clarence is as fresh and unspoiled and deftly artful as a Barrie comedy". He also favored Hayes, Hunter, and Lunt for performing honors, but singled out Mary Boland for the thankless role of the stepmother, reminding his readers of her volunteer work entertaining American troops in France during the late war. The critic for The Brooklyn Daily Eagle thought the play was excellent but felt a four-act comedy was too much. Charles Darnton in The Evening World disagreed, saying Tarkington had made all the acts entertaining.

=== Second company ===
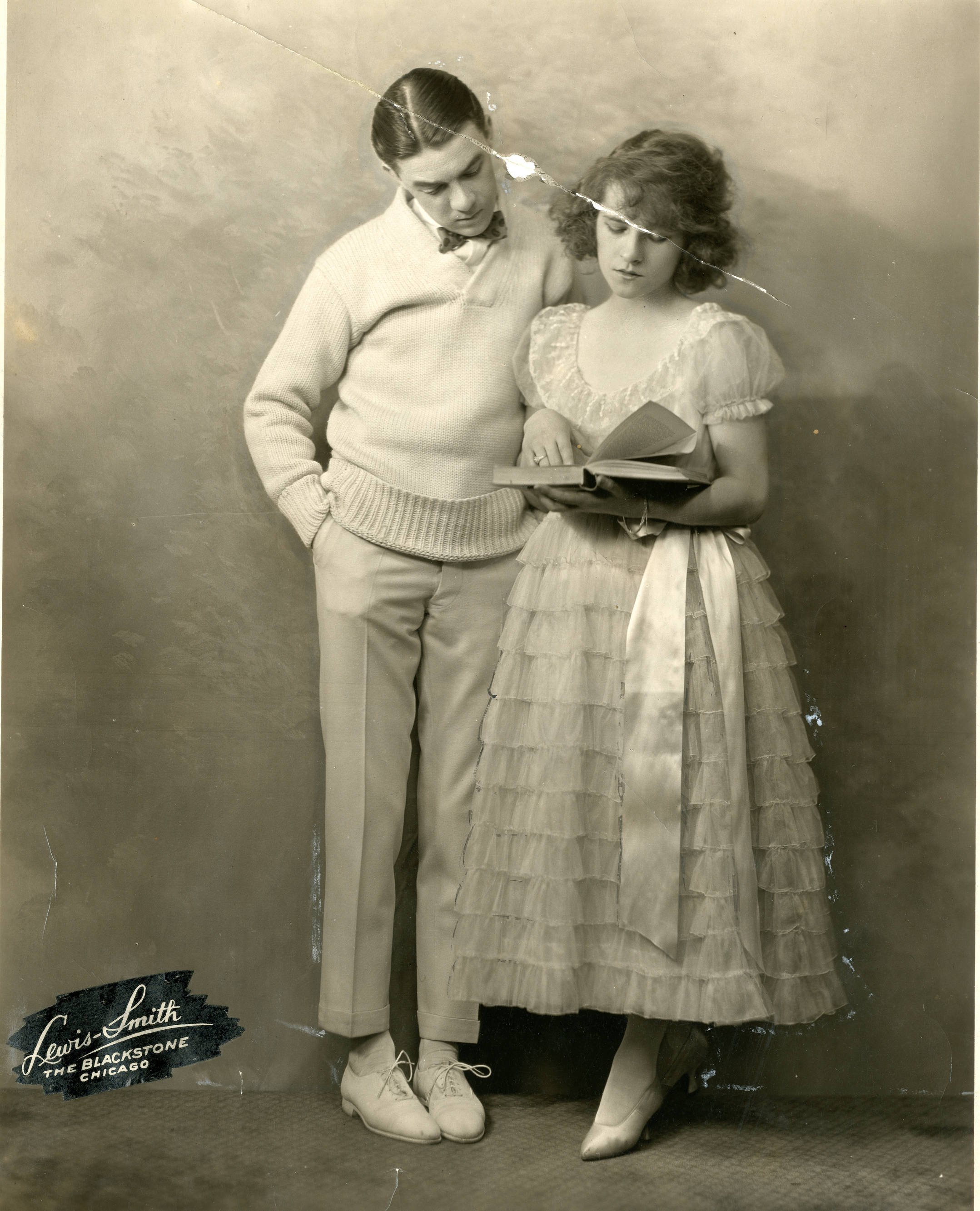
Gregory Kelly and Ruth Gordon

While still in its Broadway run, a second company for Clarence was sent to Chicago, where it opened at the Blackstone Theater on January 5, 1920. It starred Robert Adams in the title role, with Betty Murray, Gregory Kelly and Ruth Gordon in support. Percy Hammond said that Robert Adams' Clarence was overwhelmed by Kelly and Gordon's Bobby and Cora. Others in the cast were Byron Beasley and Grace Filkins as Mr. and Mrs. Wheeler, and Miss Joe Wallace as Della.

=== Broadway closing ===
Clarence closed at the Hudson Theatre on June 19, 1920, after thirty-nine weeks and 323 performances. The production went on summer hiatus until September 1920, when it played the "Subway Circuit" followed by long engagements in Philadelphia and Boston.

== Adaptations ==
=== Film ===
- Clarence (1922 film) was adapted by Clara Beranger, directed by William C. deMille, and starred Wallace Reid.
- Clarence (1937 film) was adapted by Grant Garett and Seena Owen, directed by George Archainbaud, and starred Roscoe Karns.

== Bibliography ==
- Booth Tarkington. Clarence: A Comedy in Four Acts. Samuel French, 1920.
- George C. Tyler and J. C. Furnas. Whatever Goes Up. Bobbs Merrill, 1934.
