= Pacific Rendezvous =

1942 American film directed by George Sidney

- Directed by: George Sidney
- Written by: Harry Kurnitz; P.J. Wolfson; George Oppenheimer
- Starring: Lee Bowman
- Cinematography: Paul Vogel
- Edited by: Ben Lewis
- Music by: David Snell
- Production company: Metro-Goldwyn-Mayer
- Distributed by: Loew's Inc.
- Release date: May 21, 1942
- Running time: 76 minutes
- Country: United States
- Language: English
- Budget: $225,000
- Box office: $407,000

Pacific Rendezvous is a 1942 American mystery film directed by George Sidney. It stars Lee Bowman and Jean Rogers.

The previous film version was the 1935 film Rendezvous, starring William Powell and Rosalind Russell, directed by William K. Howard and Sam Wood. P. J. Wolfson and George Oppenheimer were credited with the screenplay of Rendezvous, and Bella Spewack and Samuel Spewack were credited as adapters of the book The American Black Chamber by Major Herbert O. Yardley (1931).

== Plot ==
A code expert working for Naval Intelligence is assigned to decode enemy messages despite his desire for active duty.

== Cast ==
- Lee Bowman as Lt. William 'Bill' Gordon
- Jean Rogers as Elaine Carter
- Mona Maris as Olivia Kerlov
- Carl Esmond as Andre Leemuth
- Paul Cavanagh as Cmdr. Charles Brennan
- Blanche Yurka as Mrs. Savarina
- Russell Hicks as John Carter
- Arthur Shields as Prof. Harvey Lessmore
- William Post Jr. as Lanny
- William Tannen as Jasper Dean
- Frederick Worlock as Dr. Jackwin
- Curt Bois as Kestrin
- Felix Basch as de Segroff
- Addison Richards as Gordon Trisby
- Edward Fielding as Secretary of the Navy
- Hans Conried as Hotel Desk Clerk (uncredited)
- Byron Foulger as Decoding Room Clerk (uncredited)
- Michael Visaroff as Col. Petroff (uncredited)

== Production ==
The film was directed by George Sidney who says that George Seitz meant to direct the film but dropped out at the last minute. Sidney directed a screen test for Lee Bowman. He used Jean Rogers to appear alongside him and MGM executives liked the test so much that both were cast in the film. The film was shot in 22 days although Sidney was unhappy he had so little preparation time.

== Reception ==
According to MGM records the film earned $253,000 in the US and Canada and $154,000 elsewhere, making the studio a profit of $23,000.
