= Rendezvous (1935 film) =

1935 spy film

- theatrical release poster
- Directed by: William K. Howard; Sam Wood (uncredited)
- Screenplay by: P.J. Wolfson; George Oppenheimer; Adaptation: Bella and Samuel Spewack; Uncredited: Herman Mankiewicz; Howard Emmett Rogers
- Based on: The American Black Chamber; 1931 book by Herbert O. Yardley
- Produced by: Lawrence Weingarten
- Starring: William Powell; Rosalind Russell; Binnie Barnes
- Cinematography: William H. Daniels; James Wong Howe (uncredited)
- Edited by: Hugh Wynn
- Music by: William Axt
- Production company: Metro-Goldwyn-Mayer
- Distributed by: Loew's Inc. Mist Entertainment (UK)
- Release date: October 24, 1935 (U.S.)
- Running time: 94 minutes
- Country: United States
- Language: English

Rendezvous is a 1935 American spy film set in World War I, directed by William K. Howard, starring William Powell and Rosalind Russell and featuring Binnie Barnes, Lionel Atwill, Cesar Romero and Samuel S. Hinds. Powell plays an American cryptologist who tangles with German spies while falling in love.

The film's screenplay by P.J. Wolfson and George Oppenheimer was based on The Blonde Countess, a 1933 novel by Herbert Yardley, founder and head of the Black Chamber, as adapted by Bella and Samuel Spewack.

== Plot ==
In April 1917, former newspaperman William Gordon (William Powell) is commissioned in the U.S. Army. The day before he is to leave Washington, D.C. for France, he meets socialite Joel Carter (Rosalind Russell) at an embassy gathering. The couple spend the day together where Gordon confides that because he once wrote a book on cryptography under a pen name, the army is searching for him to put him to work behind a desk, but he is eager to get into the fighting. Just before he boards his train, Gordon is ordered to report to Assistant Secretary of War John Carter (Samuel S. Hinds). Over his objections, Carter assigns Gordon to the code-breaking room to help break an intercepted German message that Major Brennan (Lionel Atwill), an experienced British cryptologist, has been unable to decipher. Gordon learns that Carter is Joel's uncle, and that she revealed his true identity to keep him in Washington.

The U.S. is deeply concerned about the U-boat threat to its troop and supply convoys headed to France. To defeat the threat, British escorts will meet American transports before they enter the most dangerous zone. The rendezvous point will not be given to the ships until the day before they meet, transmitted by wireless in a new code devised by Major Brennan. An ammunition ship is sent first to test the new system. However a German spy ring in the city has already gained access to the code and allows the ship through to lure more valuable troop transports into their U-boat trap. Gordon deciphers the intercepted message and realizing that the code has been compromised, alerts his superiors. A troop convoy has already sailed for France and in three days they will have to send it the rendezvous location in the no longer secret code.

Brennan suspects his mistress, Olivia Karloff (Binnie Barnes), has stolen his code. He catches her red-handed, but she shoots and kills him in panic. Her unhappy superiors order her to divert the Americans away from the spy ring. Although he has a circular mailed to Olivia that contains a message written in invisible ink, and has her brought in for questioning, Gordon releases her to lead him to the rest of the spies. Joel mistakenly thinks he has been enchanted by her seductive wiles. Olivia covertly warns Captain Nicholas Nieterstein (Cesar Romero), an attaché in a foreign embassy who is part of the spy ring, that the Americans have the circular, which requires use of a reagent to reveal the message. Olivia is told that the spy ring is going to betray Nieterstein to dupe the Americans into transmitting the rendezvous location to the troop convoy.

Dining later with Gordon, Olivia "accidentally" drops one of Nieterstein's military medals in her possession into a glass of water, revealing the reagent and his complicity. The stolen code book is found in his possession, planted by his own compatriots, and he is arrested. Nieterstein commits suicide. Gordon forces Olivia to lead him to the spies in a hotel staffed by enemy agents. Joel jealousy follows them and becomes a hostage of the spies. Gordon is also captured and under duress pretends to decode the position message to the convoy. However he has given them coordinates of the hotel. When the spy ring passes along the information, the Americans intercept it, and Carter recognizes the address. Justice Department agents shoot their way into the hotel to rescue Gordon and Joel. Gordon resumes his journey to France, but as he is about to board his train, Joel again uses her influence to keep him in Washington.

== Cast ==
- William Powell as Bill Gordon
- Rosalind Russell as Joel Carter
- Binnie Barnes as Olivia Karloff
- Lionel Atwill as William Brennan
- Cesar Romero as Nieterstein
- Samuel S. Hinds as Carter
- Henry Stephenson as Ambassador Gregory
- Frank Reicher as Dr. Jackson
- Charley Grapewin as Martin
- Leonard Mudie as Roberts
- Howard Hickman as G-man
- Charles Trowbridge as Secretary of War Baker
- Murray Kinnell as de Segroff
- Sterling Holloway as Taxi Driver (uncredited)
- Larry Steers as Partitioner (uncredited)
- Milburn Stone as Carter's Aide (uncredited)

Cast notes:

- A 15-year-old Mickey Rooney and the Marx Brothers' frequent comic foil Margaret Dumont – as the woman who auctions off a kiss from Joel Carter – have uncredited bit parts.

== Production ==
Rendezvous was originally intended as a comedy-mystery vehicle for frequent costars Powell and Myrna Loy, but Loy was "on strike" at the time, in order to get better pay from MGM. Rosalind Russell was still fairly new to Hollywood, having been at MGM for barely a year when she was cast to replace Loy. Russell recalled:

I felt self-conscious. Powell and Loy had been a hit in The Thin Man, they were an unbeatable team, so my first day on Rendezvous, I tried to apologize. 'I know you don't want me, you'd rather have Myrna.' Powell denied it: 'I love Myrna, but I think this is good for you, and I'm glad we're doing it together.' He was not only a dear, he was cool. If an actor thought he could get any place by having tantrums, watching Bill Powell would have altered his opinion. I remember a story conference during which he objected to a scene that he felt wasn't right for him. He was at once imperious and lucid. 'It's beyond my histrionic ability to do this,' he said. I thought that was delicious.

The picture had several working titles including Blonde Countess, White Bird, and Puzzle Man. It was shot in five weeks from June 24 to July 29, 1935, although production was suspended for a time due to an attack of appendicitis suffered by Binnie Barnes.

When it was reported in the press that the studio was going to scrap the picture and rewrite and reshoot it, director William K. Howard responded that, in fact, they were only concerned about the ending of the film, which had been unsatisfactory from the beginning. The studio wanted to see what the audience response was in previews to guide it in crafting a new ending. Howard also announced that he was leaving the production due to a contractual obligation. Cinematographer William H. Daniels also left: they were replaced by Sam Wood and James Wong Howe, respectively, neither of whom received credit for their work. The studio brought in Herman Mankiewicz and Howard Emmett Rogers to work on the script; it was also reported that George S. Kaufman was involved in script meetings as well.

As a result of the rewrites, 17 new sets were built to shoot the new ending, which took place from September 6 to 26, with Wood directing and Howe behind the camera. The film as released, at 94 minutes, was 12 minutes shorter than the preview version, which ran 106 minutes.

== Critical response ==
At the time it was released, The New York Times film critic Andre Sennwald wrote: "With Mr. Powell at his debonair best, Rendezvous emerges as a lively and amusing melodrama", although he referred to Russell as "Metro-Goldwyn-Mayer's second-string Myrna Loy." Variety wrote: "The comedy is cleverly worked into the action and becomes a part of it instead of an interpolation, and herein lies its success. Interest is never diverted from the thread of the story. Powell is at ease as the nonchalant decoder who can face danger with a grin and teams perfectly with Russell. She has both looks and intelligence, playing the willful girl with delightful spirit."

== Adaptations ==
In 1942, the story was updated to World War II and filmed as Pacific Rendezvous with Lee Bowman and Jean Rogers in the Powell and Russell roles. Yardley's book was not credited as a source, nor were adapters Bella and Sam Spewack, but the two original screenwriters, P.J. Wolfson and George Oppenheimer, were given credit for the remake's screenplay.
