= The Fat Man (radio series) =

- J. Scott Smart recording the series
- Country of origin: United States
- Language: English
- Home station: WJZ
- Syndicates: ABC
- Starring: J. Scott Smart
- Announcer: Charles Irving; Gene Kirby; Don Lowe
- Created by: Dashiell Hammett
- Written by: Richard Ellington; Dashiell Hammett; Lawrence Klee; Daniel Shuffman; Robert Sloane; Harold Swanson
- Directed by: Clark Andrews; Charles Powers; Robert Sloane
- Produced by: Ed Rosenberg
- Original release: January 21, 1946 – September 26, 1951
- Opening theme: "Fat Man Polka"
- Sponsored by: Pepto-Bismol; Unguentine ointment Camel cigarettes Dentyne and Chiclets chewing gum

The Fat Man, a popular radio show during the 1940s and early 1950s, was a detective drama created by (or at least credited to) Dashiell Hammett, author of The Thin Man. It starred J. Scott Smart in the title role, as an overweight detective who started out anonymous but rapidly acquired the name 'Brad Runyon'.

Broadcast from the studios of WJZ in Newark, New Jersey, the series premiered on the ABC Radio Network on Monday, January 21, 1946, at 8:30 p.m., as part of a block of four new programs (I Deal in Crime, Forever Tops, and Jimmy Gleason's Diner) and ran until 1951. While the basic concept was credited to Hammett, The Fat Man was developed by producer, E.J. ("Mannie") Rosenberg. The program was directed by Clark Andrews, creator of Big Town, and Charles Powers. The main writer was Richard Ellington, with other scripts by Lawrence Klee, Daniel Shuffman, Robert Sloane, and Harold Swanton.

== Supporting cast ==
The veteran character actor Ed Begley co-starred as Sgt. O'Hara, and the supporting cast included Betty Garde, Paul Stewart, Linda Watkins, Mary Patton as Lila North and Vicki Vola, who was also the female lead in Mr. District Attorney. Amzie Strickland played Runyon's girlfriend Cathy Evans, and Nell Harrison was Runyon's mother during the early episodes. The cast also included Dan Ocko, Rolly Bester (wife of science fiction writer Alfred Bester) and Robert Dryden. An 11-piece orchestra was directed by Bernard Green, who also wrote the program's theme. The sound effects were by Ed Blaney, and the announcers were Charles Irving and sportscaster Gene Kirby (1909-1985).

== Film ==
The success of the radio series led to a movie, The Fat Man (1951), directed by William Castle with a flashback-within-a-flashback storyline. Smart retained his role as detective Brad Runyon, investigating the murder of a Los Angeles dentist with an assist from Bill Norton (Clinton Sundberg). One of the suspects is portrayed by famed Barnum & Bailey clown Emmett Kelly in his screen debut as an actor. Also in the cast are Rock Hudson, Julie London, Parley Baer (uncredited) and Jayne Meadows.

== Australian version ==
There was also an Australian version of The Fat Man, which premiered on the Australian Broadcasting Corporation on September 9, 1954 and ran through 1955 for a total of 52 episodes. It was later syndicated by the Artansa label, and 36 episodes remain in circulation today. The role of Brad Runyon was played in this version by Lloyd Berrell. Most of the original American episodes have not survived.
