= A Stranger in Town (1943 film) =

1943 film by Roy Rowland

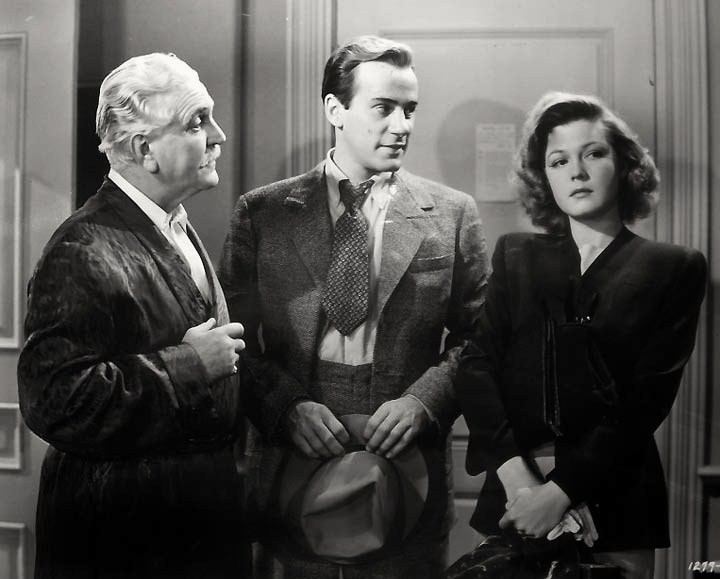
- Frank Morgan, Richard Carlson, and Jean Rogers in the film
- Directed by: Roy Rowland; John E. Burch (assistant)
- Written by: Isobel Lennart; William Kozlenko
- Produced by: Robert Sisk
- Starring: Frank Morgan; Richard Carlson; Jean Rogers
- Cinematography: Sidney Wagner
- Edited by: Elmo Veron
- Music by: Daniele Amfitheatrof; Nathaniel Shilkret
- Production company: Metro-Goldwyn-Mayer
- Distributed by: Loew's, Inc
- Release date: April 1943
- Running time: 67 minutes
- Country: United States
- Language: English

A Stranger in Town is a 1943 comedy-drama political film made by Metro-Goldwyn-Mayer. It was directed by Roy Rowland and produced by Robert Sisk from an original screenplay by Isobel Lennart and William Kozlenko. The film has a music score by Daniele Amfitheatrof and Nathaniel Shilkret, and cinematography by Sidney Wagner.

== Plot ==
Quietly planning to go duck hunting, John Josephus (Joe) Grant, a U.S. Supreme Court justice, tells his secretary Lucy Gilbert where he will be but no one else. No sooner has he arrived than a fish-and-game warden insists he pay an extra fee for a local license and toss in a "tip". Grant refuses and ends up in court, facing criminal charges.

There he discovers the honest but clumsy lawyer Bill Adams, running for mayor against the incumbent, Connison - someone he considers to be corrupt. Judge Austin Harkley, businessman Blaxton and even the sheriff appear to be in the mayor's pocket, and when Bill is insulted and throws a punch, they conspire to keep him in jail.

Joe intervenes on Bill's behalf without telling anyone his true identity. He helps free Bill in the legal dispute, teaching him how to cite precedent. Later he manages to free Lucy and Bill after she shows up and is denied a room at the local hotel for no good reason and more rough stuff breaks out. Later, after the hotel manager tries to defuse the situation by declining to press charges against them for affray, Bill brings a further charge against the management for providing inadequate bed linen.

Seeing the town people are turning against him and he is in danger of losing the coming election, Mayor Connison has Bill evicted from his offices and arranges that no others are available for hire in the town. After Bill sets up for business out in the street, a riot breaks out in which Lucy takes part wielding a thick law book, while Joe is knocked down and needs medical attention, and Bill is again detained.

That evening, the mayor holds a campaign meeting in which he claims that he is ready to stand down in favor of somebody younger, but that he is disappointed in Bill's trouble-making and failure to even come and address the meeting. Meanwhile Joe has revealed his true identity to Judge Harkley and made him obtain statements from those who have been aiding the mayor in dominating the town. Now he interrupts the campaign proceedings, delivers a rousing speech on the duty of citizens to make sure that democratic government remains honest, and has the mayor and his cronies arrested for corruption.

Bill is considerably shaken but has attracted Lucy, who responds warmly to admiration. In the film's final scene, Joe tells colleagues on his return that he has had a fine time on his days off. He also assures the new mayor, who has accompanied him, that he has spent half the night memorising the wedding vows for Bill's coming marriage to Lucy.

== Cast ==
- Frank Morgan as John Josephus Grant
- Richard Carlson as Bill Adams
- Jean Rogers as Lucy Gilbert
- Porter Hall as Judge Austin Harkley
- Robert Barrat as Mayor Connison
- Donald MacBride as Vinnie Z. Blaxton
- Walter Baldwin as Tom Cooney
- Andrew Tombes as Roscoe Swade
- Olin Howland as Homer Todds
- Chill Wills as Charles Craig
- Irving Bacon as Orrin Todds
- Eddie Dunn as Henry
- Gladys Blake as Birdie
- John Hodiak as Hart Ridges
- Edward Keane as Blaxton's Lawyer
- Robert Homans as Sergeant
