= Harry Essex =

American screenwriter and director (1910–1997)

- Born: November 29, 1910; New York City, New York, US
- Died: February 6, 1997 (aged 86); Los Angeles, California, US
- Occupation: American TV/Film screenwriter/director
- Years active: 1936–1996

Harry Essex (November 29, 1910 – February 6, 1997) was an American screenwriter and director in feature films and television. Born and raised in New York City, his career spanned more than fifty years.

== Career ==
After graduating from St John's University in 1936, he did welfare work by day, while writing for the theatre by night. Among Essex's first jobs were stints on the New York City newspapers New York Daily Mirror and the Brooklyn Eagle, short stories for Collier's and The Saturday Evening Post as well as work in a Broadway play titled Something for Nothing (which Essex later called "a resounding failure").

Writing for the movies was uppermost in Essex's mind throughout the period (and he did co-write the original story for Universal's Man Made Monster (1941)), but "the big break" never came, and World War II intervened as he was called into the draft, serving in the U.S. Army Signal Corps. Five or six days after Essex's discharge in 1947, he ran into an old acquaintance whose new job was finding playwrights to turn into screenwriters for Columbia Pictures. Essex wrote or co-wrote dozens of movies and numerous TV shows during his lengthy Hollywood career.

Essex co-wrote Universal's The Fat Man (1951), which starred J. Scott Smart as the obese detective Brad Runyon, a role he had played on radio since 1946. (The series was developed especially for radio by Dashiell Hammett, creator of The Thin Man, but as he had just been jailed for refusing to co-operate with the House of Representatives' Committee on Un-American Activities, Hammett's name was absent on the screen credits of The Fat Man.) Essex and Earl Felton received screenplay credit on The Las Vegas Story (1952), but not their co-writer Paul Jarrico, who had been blacklisted.

== Partial filmography ==
Year	Title	Job	Notes
1941	Man Made Monster	Writer – story	Feature film
1947	Dragnet	Writer	Feature film
1947	Desperate	Writer	Feature film
1950	The Killer That Stalked New York	Writer	Sci-fi/Horror film
1951	The Fat Man	Co-writer, with Dashiell Hammett & Leonard Lee	Feature film
1952	Kansas City Confidential	Writer	Feature film
1952	The Las Vegas Story	Writer	Feature film
1953	I, the Jury	Writer, director	Feature film
1953	It Came from Outer Space	Writer – screenplay	Horror film
1954	Creature from the Black Lagoon	Writer	Sci-fi/Horror film
1954	Dragnet	Writer – screenplay	Feature film
1955	Mad at the World	Director	Feature film
1959–1960	Bat Masterson (TV series)	Writer	4 episodes
1960–1961	The Untouchables	Writer (2 teleplays, 3 stories)	6 episodes total
1963	77 Sunset Strip	Writer – teleplay	5 episodes
1965	The Sons of Katie Elder	Writer – screenplay	Western/Feature film
1965	I Dream of Jeannie	Writer	1 episode ("The Moving Finger")
1971	Octaman	Writer, director	Sci-fi film
1972	The Cremators	Writer, director	Sci-fi film
1985	Hostage Flight	Writer – story	Feature film
1996	It Came From Outer Space II	Writer (earlier screenplay)	Sci-fi/Horror

== Death and legacy ==
Essex died on February 6, 1997, in Los Angeles. In 2004, he was retrospectively awarded the 1954 Retro Hugo Award for Best Dramatic Presentation, Short Form for It Came from Outer Space.
