= Scott Kolk =

American actor

Scot Kolk
- Born: Walter Scott Kolk; May 16, 1905; Baltimore, Maryland, U.S.
- Died: December 1, 1993 (aged 88); Canton, Maine, U.S.
- Occupation: Actor
- Years active: 1924–1938
- Spouses: Azadia Newman (m. 1938; div. 1943): Margaret Colton (m. 19??-1978)

Walter Scott Kolk (May 16, 1905 – December 1, 1993) was an American actor in the 1920s and 1930s. He is most notable for his roles in All Quiet on the Western Front and Secret Agent X-9. During his years as an entertainer at clubs, he was sometimes billed as Walter Kolk.

== Early years ==
Kolk was born on May 16, 1905, in Baltimore, Maryland, but he considered Maine his home state. He attended Summer Street Grammar School in South Portland, Maine, Maine, before going bck to Maryland for four years at a military school. His mother was Mrs. Anna E. Kolk, and he had two sisters and a brother.

== Career ==
Kolk was a professional musician before he became an actor. He played drums for orchestras on the Keith Circuit and for Meyer Davis's orchestra and introduced the Black Bottom dance to Washington, D. C., when that orchestra played at Club Chanticleer there. He also was a "favorite singer and entertainer" at the Le Paradis supper club in Washington, and he headed the first revue at the Silver Slipper supper club when it opened in that city.

Actress Marion Davies saw Kolk perform musically in Venice, Italy, while she was on a tour of Europe. She suggested that he try performing in films, which led him to take screen tests at Metro-Goldwyn-Mayer. As a result of those tests, he was cast in Davies's first sound film.

In the early 1930s, Kolk left the film business. He had grown disenchanted with the lifestyle associated with film people and with himself, saying "I got so I couldn't live with myself." He bought a farm in Maine with his savings and lived alone with minimal contact with neighbors. He spent time with the land, including plowing, harvesting, and hunting. About 1 1/2 years later, he returned to Hollywood.

Kolk's Broadway roles include Lieutenant Dale in Take the Air (1928) and George Armstrong in Baby Pompadour (1934). His work in films included having the starring role in the 12-part serial Secret Agent X-9 (1937).

== Death ==
Kolk died on December 1, 1993, in Canton, Maine.

== Filmography ==
Year	Title	Role	Notes
1929	Marianne	Lieutenant Frane	(silent and musical versions)
1929	Hold Your Man	Jack	
1929	Dynamite	Radio Announcer	Uncredited
1930	All Quiet on the Western Front	Leer	
1930	For the Defense	Jack Defoe	
1931	My Sin	Larry Gordon	
1937	Secret Agent X-9	Agent Dexter (X-9)	Serial
1937	The Wildcatter	'Lucky' Conlon	
1937	It's All Yours	2nd Photographer	Uncredited
1937	The Awful Truth	Mr. Barnsley	Uncredited
1937	Murder in Greenwich Village	Larry Foster	
1937	All American Sweetheart	Lance Corbett	
1938	Little Miss Roughneck	Al Patridge	
1938	Women in Prison	Bob Wayne	
1938	Extortion	Larry Campbell	
1938	I Am the Law	Law Student	Uncredited, (final film role)
