= Love in a Bungalow =

Film directed by Ray McCarey

- Theatrical release poster
- Directed by: Ray McCarey
- Screenplay by: Austin Parker; Karen DeWolf; James Mulhauser
- Story by: Eleanore Griffin; William Rankin
- Produced by: E.M. Asher
- Starring: Nan Grey; Kent Taylor; Louise Beavers; J. Scott Smart; Minerva Urecal; Hobart Cavanaugh
- Cinematography: Milton Krasner
- Edited by: Irving Birnbaum; Bernard W. Burton
- Production company: Universal Pictures
- Distributed by: Universal Pictures
- Release date: June 27, 1937
- Running time: 67 minutes
- Country: United States
- Language: English

Love in a Bungalow is a 1937 American comedy film directed by Ray McCarey and written by Austin Parker, Karen DeWolf and James Mulhauser. The film stars Nan Grey, Kent Taylor, Louise Beavers, J. Scott Smart, Minerva Urecal and Hobart Cavanaugh. The film was released on June 27, 1937, by Universal Pictures.

== Plot ==
One day Mary Callahan finds a man that has slept in a bungalow she is trying to sell, a few days later he appears again seeking shelter from the rain, she lets him in and they listen to radio while the storm doesn't end. The radio station has a contest for the best letter explaining a couple's love, so they pretend to be married and send a letter.

== Cast ==
- Nan Grey as Mary Callahan
- Kent Taylor as Jeff Langan
- Louise Beavers as Millie
- J. Scott Smart as Wilbur Babcock
- Minerva Urecal as Mrs. Kester
- Hobart Cavanaugh as Mr. Kester
- Richard Carle as Mr. Bisbee
- Marjorie Main as Miss Emma Bisbee
- Margaret McWade as Miss Lydia Bisbee
- Robert Spencer as Tracy
- Arthur Hoyt as A man
- Florence Lake as The 'Ga-Ga' Prospect
- Armand 'Curly' Wright as Janitor
- Dell Henderson as Manager
- Otto Fries as Policeman
- William "Billy" Benedict as Telegraph boy
- Sherry Hall as Clerk in Bisbee's Office
- Edward Earle as Clerk in Bisbee's Office
- Arthur Yeoman as Clerk in Bisbee's Office
- James T. Mack as Clerk in Bisbee's Office
- John Iven as Clerk in Bisbee's Office
- Burr Caruth as Clerk in Bisbee's Office
- Bobby Watson as Barker
- Henry Roquemore as James
- Stanley Blystone as Policeman
- Betty Mack as Girl

== Critical reception ==
The Film Daily offered a positive review and described the film as a "pleasing domestic comedy" and "breezy entertainment" that "moves at a lively pace" under Raymond McCarey's direction.

Variety's review was negative and dismissed the film as a "Synthetic little story for adolescents, written, directed and acted in an amateurish manner." It commented that Nan Grey offers nothing but a "freshness of youth."
