= Marianne (1929 silent film) =

1929 American silent romantic drama film

- Directed by: Robert Z. Leonard
- Written by: Laurence Stallings; Gladys Unger; Dale Van Every (also story); Joseph Farnham (titles)
- Starring: Marion Davies
- Cinematography: Oliver T. Marsh
- Edited by: James C. McKay; Basil Wrangell
- Production company: Cosmopolitan Productions
- Distributed by: Metro-Goldwyn-Mayer
- Release date: August 24, 1929
- Running time: 80 minutes
- Country: United States
- Language: Silent (English intertitles)

Marianne is a 1929 American silent romantic-drama film about a French farm girl who, despite already having a French fiancé, falls in love with an American soldier during World War I. It was made first as a silent film, then as a musical with a different cast, but Marion Davies starred in both versions.

== Cast ==
- Marion Davies as Marianne
- Oscar Shaw as Stagg
- Fred Solm as André (as Robert Castle)
- Robert Ames as Soapy
- Scott Kolk as Lieutenant Frane
- Émile Chautard as Père Joseph
- Mack Swain as General
- Oscar Apfel as Major

== Production ==
In her 30th and final silent film, Marion Davies starred for director Robert Z. Leonard in this World War I story about a French girl who falls for an American soldier (Oscar Shaw). Davies was rushed into this project after production of the ill-fated The Five O'Clock Girl shuttered. The film was remade as a sound film. This silent version survives but was long thought lost. When Fred Lawrence Guiles wrote his biography of Davies in 1972, he stated the silent version was lost. The film offered Davies another chance to masquerade, this time as the aged army officer with a big mustache. By the time the decision was made to re-shoot the entire film as a sound film, Oscar Shaw was out and Lawrence Gray was signed as Davies' leading man.
