= Adelaide Heilbron =

American screenwriter

- Born: June 25, 1892; Seattle, Washington, United States
- Died: March 6, 1974 (aged 81); Seattle, Washington, United States
- Occupation: Screenwriter
- Years active: 1921-1944 (film)

Adelaide Heilbron was an American screenwriter known for films like The Dressmaker from Paris and Lessons for Wives.

== Biography ==
Adelaide Heilbron was born into a prominent Seattle family. Her parents were George H. Heilbron (editor at The Seattle Post Intelligencer) and Adelaide Elizabeth Piper (daughter of W.H. Piper, a well-known Boston bookstore owner). Heilbron graduated from Smith College in 1920 and got her start in the film industry providing coverage for Famous Players–Lasky in New York, moving into script supervising before becoming a screenwriter.

== Partial filmography ==
- At the End of the World (1921)
- The Danger Point (1922)
- Lilies of the Field (1924)
- New Lives for Old (1925)
- Mantrap (1926)
- Syncopating Sue (1926)
- Dance Magic (1927)
- Heart to Heart (1928)
- The Butter and Egg Man (1928)
- Captain Swagger (1928)
- My Sin (1931)
- Misleading Lady (1932)
- It's All Yours (1937)
- Cheers for Miss Bishop (1941)
- Friendly Enemies (1942)
- Faces in the Fog (1944)

== Bibliography ==
- Stenn, David. Clara Bow: Runnin' Wild. Cooper Square Press, 2000.
