= My Sin =

1931 film

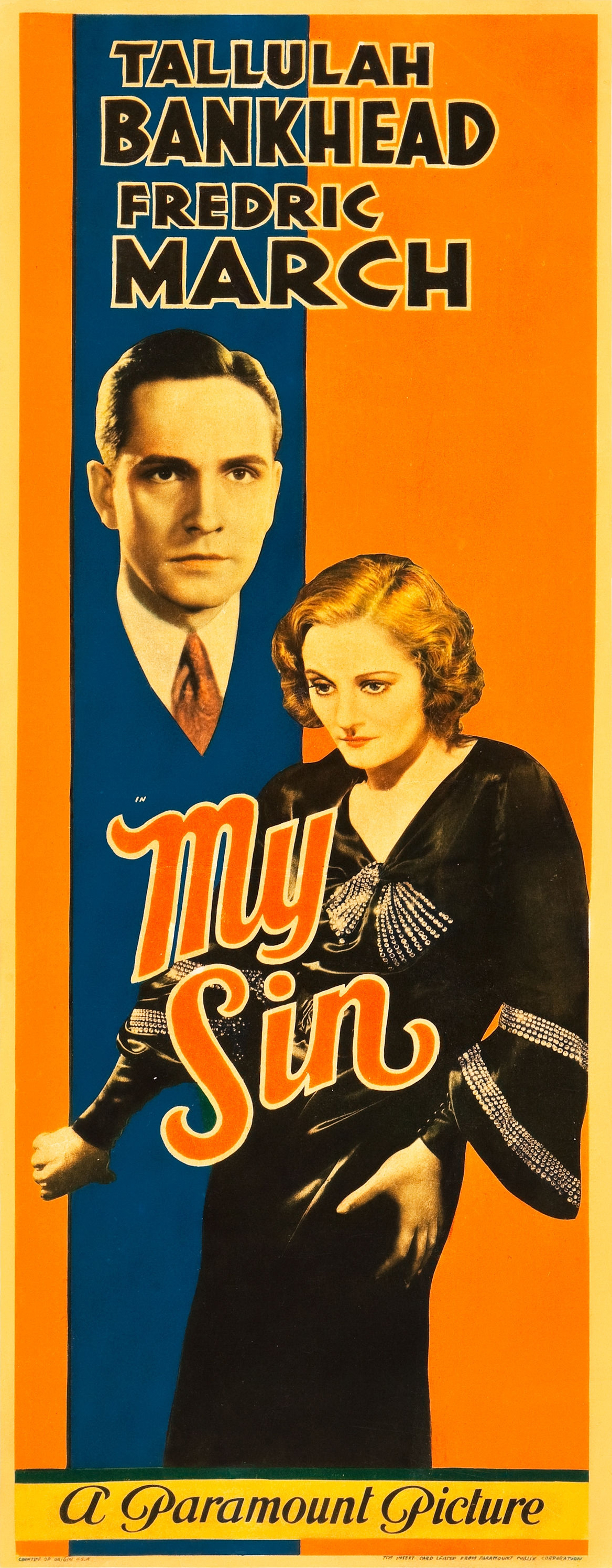
- Insert card poster
- Directed by: George Abbott
- Screenplay by: George Abbott; Owen Davis; Adelaide Heilbron
- Based on: Her Past by Frederick J. Jackson
- Produced by: George Abbott
- Starring: Tallulah Bankhead; Fredric March; Harry Davenport; Scott Kolk; Anne Sutherland; Margaret Adams; Lily Cahill
- Cinematography: George J. Folsey
- Edited by: Emma Hill
- Music by: Johnny Green; Frank Tours
- Production company: Paramount Pictures
- Distributed by: Paramount Pictures
- Release date: October 3, 1931
- Running time: 80 minutes
- Country: United States
- Language: English

My Sin is a 1931 American pre-Code drama film directed by George Abbott, and written by Abbott, Owen Davis, Adelaide Heilbron. It was adapted from the play, Her Past, written by Frederick J. Jackson. The film stars Tallulah Bankhead, Fredric March, Harry Davenport, Scott Kolk, and Lily Cahill. The film was released on October 3, 1931, by Paramount Pictures.

== Plot ==
In Panama, infamous nightclub hostess Carlotta kills, in a struggle, a man in self-defense and is put on trial for murder. Her defense counsel is Dick Grady, a lawyer who has become an alcoholic. When he proves Carlotta's innocence, however, Dick regains respect and new employment through Roger Metcalf. He also manages to save Carlotta from committing suicide. He lends her money, and they both dream up a new identity for her as "Ann Trevor," and she moves to New York. Through various letters and repayment checks, Dick learns that "Ann Trevor" is happy and successful and he soon realizes he is in love with her.

In the meantime Ann is successfully working in New York as interior decorator, sharing an apartment with her boss, Helen Grace. One customer, Larry Gordon, is so enthusiastic about Ann's work, that he falls in love with her. When Roger Metcalf comes to a dinner with Larry, his mother and Ann, Roger recognizes her and calls Dick to come along. Ann is somehow forced to tell Larry the truth about her past. And after that the relationship breaks apart.

Finally Dick moves to New York, buys the cottage Larry had bought for her, and calls in the shop to send him Ann Trevor for remodeling. They confess their love for each other, and they walk together through the entrance of the cottage.

== Cast ==
- Tallulah Bankhead as Carlotta / Ann Trevor
- Fredric March as Dick Grady
- Harry Davenport as Roger Metcalf
- Scott Kolk as Lawrence "Larry" Gordon
- Anne Sutherland as Mrs. Gordon
- Margaret Adams as Paula Marsden
- Lily Cahill as Helen Grace
- Joseph Calleia as Juan

== Production ==
Filming of My Sin began June 15, 1931, at Paramount-Publix New York Studios in Astoria, Long Island.

== See also ==
- The House That Shadows Built (1931) Paramount promotional film with excerpts of My Sin
