= The War Against Mrs. Hadley =

1942 film by Harold S. Bucquet

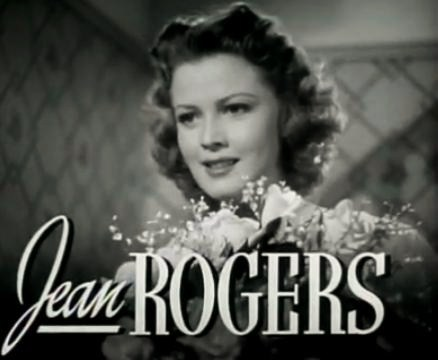
- Jean Rogers in film
- Directed by: Harold S. Bucquet
- Written by: George Oppenheimer
- Produced by: Irving Asher
- Starring: Fay Bainter; Edward Arnold
- Cinematography: Karl Freund
- Edited by: Elmo Veron
- Music by: David Snell
- Distributed by: Metro-Goldwyn-Mayer
- Release date: September 27, 1942
- Running time: 86 minutes
- Country: United States
- Language: English
- Budget: $307,000
- Box office: $1,357,000

The War Against Mrs. Hadley is a 1942 American drama film directed by Harold S. Bucquet and starring Fay Bainter and Edward Arnold. The plot depicts how wealthy society matron Stella Hadley selfishly refuses to sacrifice her family or material comforts during World War II, until tragedy strikes an old rival. The script by George Oppenheimer was nominated for an Academy Award for Best Original Screenplay.

== Plot ==
Mrs. Stella Hadley is a wealthy society widow living in Washington, D.C. Her husband once owned a staunchly Republican newspaper, the Chronicle, but it was sold to the Winters family and the new editorial board began supporting the Democrats and President Franklin D. Roosevelt.

The film opens on December 7, 1941, (Note: Bainter's birthday was also December 7, a point brought out on the subsequent radio play presentation.) as Mrs. Hadley celebrates her birthday with her son who drinks too much, Ted; her intelligent daughter, Pat; her ditzy best friend, Mrs. Cecilia Talbot; her husband's old friend, Elliott Fulton; and her doctor and best friend, Dr. Leonard V. Meecham. When the party-goers learn of the attack on Pearl Harbor, Mrs. Hadley haughtily announces that war will not change her lifestyle (a decision only Dr. Meecham supports).

Ted works for Elliott Fulton, who has a high-ranking job at the War Department. He often lies about working late in order to go out drinking. Mrs. Talbot joins a women's war service organization headed by Mrs. Winters, hiding her involvement from Mrs. Hadley. Pat volunteers at an enlisted men's canteen and meets Army soldier Michael Fitzpatrick. The two fall in love. When Ted is drafted, Mrs. Hadley tries to have Elliott pull strings to get him out of duty, but he declines. When she realizes that Elliott was behind the call-up, she vows never to see him again. Ted sobers up after realizing he has to go into combat. Pat and Mike decide to wed, but Mrs. Hadley refuses to bless their union and does not attend the wedding. When Mrs. Hadley discovers that Mrs. Talbot is spending time with Mrs. Winters' women's war service organization, she ends their friendship. The sniveling Dr. Meecham supports her every decision.

Mrs. Hadley's refusal to sacrifice for the war effort and her anger at her family leaves her socially and personally isolated. She becomes depressed, and worries constantly about Ted (from whom she has not heard in months).

Ted wins the Distinguished Service Cross (DSC) fighting in the Pacific. Mrs. Hadley receives a letter from Ted in which he describes his new friendship with Tony Winters, Mrs. Winters' son. The press informs Mrs. Hadley that Tony, too, will win the DSC, but posthumously. Mrs. Hadley's reserve breaks down, and she consoles Mrs. Winters. President Roosevelt sends Mrs. Hadley a hand-written note praising her son, and Pat sends Mrs. Hadley a telegram announcing she is pregnant.

Mrs. Hadley undergoes a complete change of heart. She reconciles with Mrs. Talbot, marries Elliott Fulton, turns her home into a center for war work, and decides to fly to Phoenix, Arizona, for the birth of her grandchild.

== Cast ==
- Fay Bainter as Mrs. Stella Hadley
- Edward Arnold as Elliott Fulton
- Richard Ney as Theodore "Ted" Hadley
- Jean Rogers as Patricia "Pat" Hadley
- Sara Allgood as Mrs. Fitzpatrick
- Spring Byington as Cecilia Talbot
- Van Johnson as Michael Fitzpatrick
- Isobel Elsom as Mrs. Laura Winters
- Frances Rafferty as Sally
- Dorothy Morris as Millie
- Halliwell Hobbes as Bennett the Butler
- Connie Gilchrist as Cook
- Stephen McNally as Peters (as Horace McNally)
- Miles Mander as Dr. Leonard V. Meecham
- Rags Ragland as Louie

== Production ==
According to George Oppenheimer, who wrote the screenplay, the idea for the script came to him immediately after the attack on Pearl Harbor. But it was not until mid-March 1942 that he had worked out the story in his head. He pitched the idea the last week of March to his friend, Irving Asher, who was a producer at Metro-Goldwyn-Mayer (MGM). According to Oppenheimer, Asher was "immediately enthusiastic". A few days later, Louis B. Mayer held a story conference during which MGM staff read brief synopses of scripts and Mayer decided which to put into production. During the conference, Oppenheimer says, Asher contacted Mayer on the intercom and asked to address the conference. Mayer agreed, Oppenheimer and Asher presented the story, and Mayer approved the film for production.

Oppenheimer wrote the script in just under seven weeks. Considered a B movie because of its low budget and lack of major stars, production fell under the control of Dore Schary, then supervisor of B picture units at MGM. Irving Asher would produce. Pre-production was under way in April when MGM decided to allow Irving Asher to leave the United States in June for the United Kingdom. Publicly, the studio would say he was restarting MGM's British film production unit. In truth, Asher was joining Lord Mountbatten's combat film photography unit. With Asher preparing to leave, Oppenheimer says, Schary gave the screenwriter control over the production, casting, and choice of technical crew.

MGM said on April 14, 1942, that 25-year-old actor Robert Sterling would "star" opposite newcomer Jean Rogers in the picture. MGM then announced the names of much of the rest of the major cast on April 27, saying Fay Bainter, Van Johnson, and Spring Byington would star. But MGM casting director Billy Grady, eager to cast newcomer Van Johnson in the right role, approached Oppenheimer and convinced him to put Johnson in the role of the eager, love-lorn Army sergeant. Johnson made a remarkably good screen test, and Oppenheimer put him in the picture.

The studio also announced on April 27 that George Oppenheimer had scripted the film, which would begin principal photography in mid May. Bainter later said she was reluctant to play the part because the character of Mrs. Hadley was so unlikeable, but she felt the redemption scenes at the end gave her an opportunity for some excellent acting. The studio said on April 29 that Harold Bucquet would direct the picture. This was the first motion picture to come out of Hollywood depicting the home-front experience of an American family in World War II, and the directing job had been highly sought after. Edward Arnold was cast on May 8, and Sara Allgood on May 15.

Principal photography began at the MGM studio on May 11, 1942, and concluded on June 5, 1942.

In early September 1942, MGM announced that the film's world premiere would be at Loew's Capitol Theatre in Washington, D.C. A national release would follow. Carter Barron, MGM's representative in the District of Columbia, organized the premiere. Tickets to the premiere were offered to those who purchased war bonds, with better seats going to those who purchased more bonds.

The picture's world premiere occurred on September 27. Before the screening, music was provided by the Sam J. Kaufman band and orchestra, ballerina Patricia Bowman performed, and the Rhythm Rockets swing band played. Fay Bainter and Edward Arnold both appeared and addressed the audience before the film.

The screening raised $1,822,675 in war bonds ($35,915,235 in 2025 dollars).

== Reception ==
Critics had a mixed reaction to the film. Bosley Crowther called it "flat" and "undramatic" in The New York Times. Andrew R. Kelley called it one of the "choicest propaganda pictures yet issued" in The Evening Star. He had extensive praise for the cast, concluding that "even the small roles [were] expertly acted" and calling "droll and subtle" the performances by Allgood, Hobbes, and Byington. However, he felt that Mrs. Hadley's moral awakening at the end seemed sudden (for which he blamed writer George Oppenheimer), and felt the picture was a bit too "leisurely" paced. Film historian Hilton Tims later called The War Against Mrs. Hadley "a curious but effective item of propaganda". Film historian Alex Nissen has argued that Bainter's performance was so good, she should have been nominated for a Best Actress Oscar. Oppenheimer himself felt the script was the best he had ever written, but that much of the supporting cast was weak as so many actors and actresses had gone into war work or combat duty.

According to MGM records, the film made $695,000 in the U.S. and Canada and $662,000 elsewhere, earning the studio a profit of $603,000.

Screenwriter George Oppenheimer was nominated for an Academy Award for Best Original Screenplay.

== Legacy ==
Van Johnson appeared in the picture with only minimal makeup and with his normal hair color. Although he had made several motion pictures already, this was the first time his natural good looks were not masked. He was relaxed and winsome in the role, and not only critics but fans took notice of his performance. The War Against Mrs. Hadley launched his film career.

The War Against Mrs. Hadley was honored with appearances by Bainter and Arnold on September 25, 1942, on The Kate Smith Hour radio program on CBS Radio with Kate Smith.

The film was turned into a radio play, which aired on the one-year anniversary of the attack, December 7, 1942, on the Lux Radio Theatre on CBS. It featured much of the same cast as the film, including the top stars.

== Bibliography ==
- Davis, Ronald (2001). Van Johnson: MGM's Golden Boy. Jackson, Miss.: University Press of Mississippi. ISBN 9781578063772.
- Dietz, Howard (1944). Who's Who at Metro-Goldwyn-Mayer. Culver City, Calif.: Metro-Goldwyn-Mayer.
- Dick, Bernard F. (1996). The Star-Spangled Screen: The American World War II Film. Lexington, Ky.: University Press of Kentucky Press. ISBN 9780813108858.
- Kinn, Gail; Piazza, Jim (2014). The Academy Awards: The Complete Unofficial History. New York: Black Dog & Leventhal Publishers. ISBN 9781579129866.
- Nissen, Axel (2006). Actresses of a Certain Character: Forty Familiar Hollywood Faces From the Thirties to the Fifties. Jefferson, N.C.: Mcfarland & Co. ISBN 9780786427468.
- Oppenheimer, George (1966). The View From the Sixties: Memories of a Spent Life. New York: D. McKay Co.
- Tims, Hilton (1987). Emotion Pictures: The 'Women's Picture', 1930-55. London: Columbus Books. ISBN 9780862873264.
