= Just You, Just Me =

1929 song, performed by Judy Garland and others

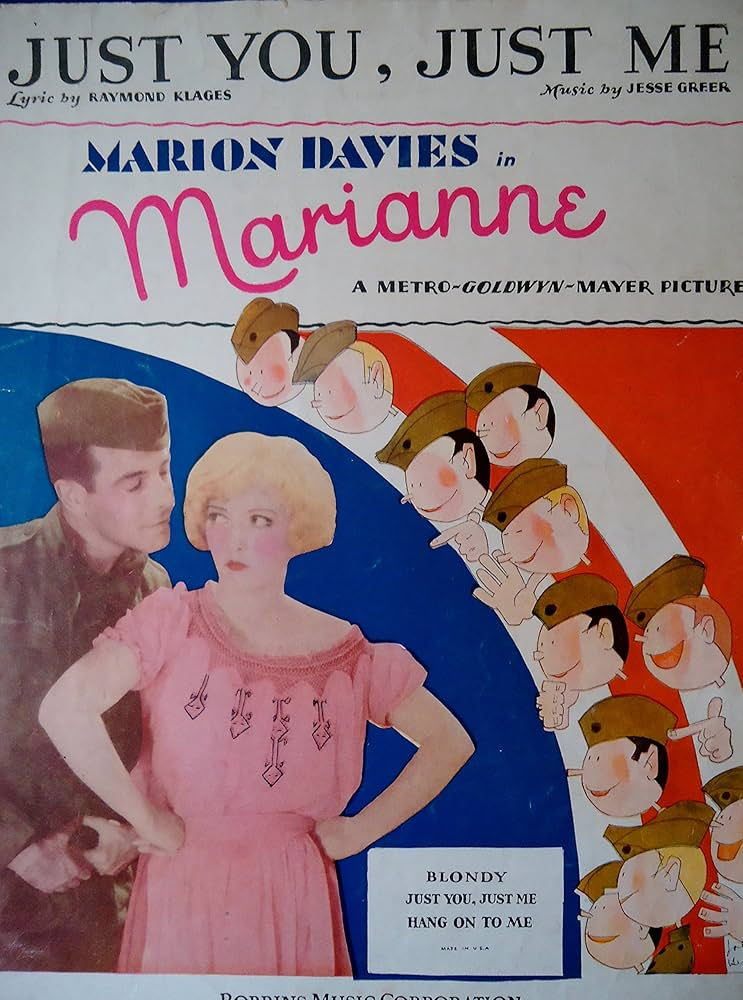
Sheet music cover, 1929

"Just You, Just Me" is a song from the 1929 musical film Marianne, composed by Jesse Greer with lyrics by Raymond Klages. It was introduced by Marion Davies and Lawrence Gray. The song has had many revisions after its first appearance and has become a jazz standard, having been recorded instrumentally by Red Norvo, Stan Tracey, Oscar Peterson and Lester Young, Buddy Rich, Artie Shaw, Les Paul, Benny Carter, Buddy Bregman, Tex Beneke, Coleman Hawkins, Harry James, Erroll Garner, Benny Goodman, Earl Hines, Joe Pass, Buddy Tate and Abdullah Ibrahim, Les Brown, Bill Evans, Bill Coleman and Duke Ellington.

Thelonious Monk's 1948 composition, "Evidence", is a contrafact of "Just You, Just Me". Monk's tune was originally called "Justice" (which sounds like "Just Us", a reference to "Just You, Just Me"), then renamed "We Named It Justice", and finally "Evidence". Both songs are included on the CD reissue of Monk's 1964 live album, Live at the It Club.

Cliff Edwards had a hit recording of the song in 1929. Bing Crosby recorded it in 1954 for use on his radio show and it was subsequently included in the box set The Bing Crosby CBS Radio Recordings (1954-56) issued by Mosaic Records (catalog MD7-245) in 2009. Ella Fitzgerald recorded it for Ella Swings Lightly (1958). The song has also been recorded vocally by, among others, Petula Clark, Doris Day, Nat King Cole, Rockapella, Diana Krall, Judy Garland, Jaye P. Morgan and Rosemary Clooney. In 1999, Lester Young's rendition of "Just You, Just Me" was inducted into the Grammy Hall of Fame.

== Film appearances ==
- 1929: Marianne – played on ukulele and sung by Lawrence Gray, reprised by Marion Davies, reprised by Lawrence Gray and by Cliff Edwards.
- 1957: This Could Be the Night – performed by Ray Anthony and His Orchestra.
- 1974. Groove Tube, Ken Shapiro source imdb
- 1977: New York, New York – sung by Liza Minnelli.
- 1996: Everyone Says I Love You – sung by Edward Norton.

== See also ==
- List of 1920s jazz standards
