= Night Key =

1937 film by Lloyd Corrigan

- Theatrical release poster
- Directed by: Lloyd Corrigan
- Screenplay by: Tristram Tupper; Jack Moffitt, as John C. Moffitt
- Story by: William Pierce
- Produced by: Robert Pressnel
- Starring: Boris Karloff; Warren Hull; Jean Rogers
- Cinematography: George Robinson; John P. Fulton
- Edited by: Otis Garrett
- Music by: Louis Forbes
- Color process: Black and white
- Production company: Universal Pictures
- Distributed by: Universal Pictures
- Release dates: April 18, 1937 (New York City); May 2, 1937 (U.S.); August 16, 1937 (Los Angeles)
- Running time: 68 minutes
- Country: United States
- Language: English
- Budget: $192,000+

Night Key is a 1937 American crime horror science fiction film starring Boris Karloff and released by Universal Pictures.

== Plot ==
The inventor of a burglar alarm attempts to get back at the man who stole the profits to his invention (Hinds) before he goes blind. The device is then subverted by gangsters who apply pressure to the inventor and use his device to facilitate burglaries.

== Cast ==
- Boris Karloff - David Mallory
- Warren Hull - Jimmy Travis (billed as J. Warren Hull)
- Jean Rogers - Joan Mallory
- Alan Baxter - "The Kid"
- Samuel S. Hinds - Stephen Ranger (billed as Samuel Hinds)
- Hobart Cavanaugh - "Petty Louie"
- David Oliver - "Mike"
- Ward Bond - "Fingers"
- Frank Reicher - Carl
- Edwin Maxwell - Kruger

== Production ==
Filming began on January 18, 1937, with a budget of $175,000. Filming ended on either February 16 or February 20, 6 days over schedule and $17,000 over budget.

This was the last film in which Boris Karloff was billed by only his last name, a policy that Universal had begun with The Old Dark House in 1932 and had continued for eight films across six years during the height of Karloff's career.

== Home video release ==
This film, along with Tower of London, The Climax, The Strange Door and The Black Castle, was released on DVD in 2006 by Universal Studios as part of The Boris Karloff Collection.

This DVD set contains the rerelease version of this film from Realart Pictures, Inc. It also contains the rerelease version of the theatrical trailer

The packaging for this DVD set erroneously indicates that this film has a running time of 78 minutes.

== See also ==
- Boris Karloff filmography
