= New Lives for Old =

1925 film

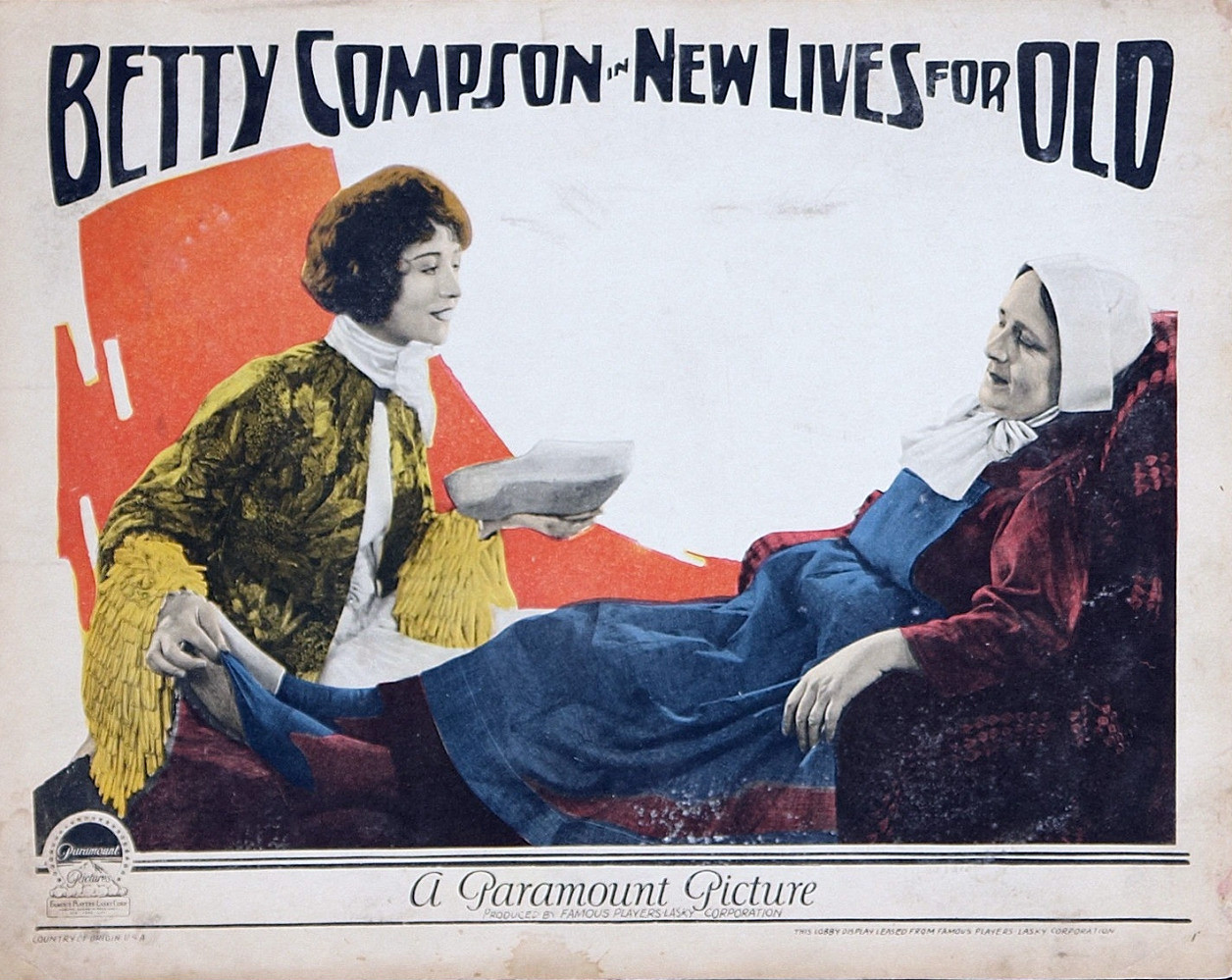
- Lobby card
- Directed by: Clarence G. Badger
- Written by: Adelaide Heilbron
- Produced by: Adolph Zukor; Jesse Lasky
- Starring: Betty Compson
- Cinematography: L. Guy Wilky
- Distributed by: Paramount Pictures
- Release date: February 22, 1925
- Running time: 70 minutes
- Country: United States
- Language: Silent (English intertitles)

New Lives for Old is a 1925 American silent drama film that was produced by Famous Players–Lasky, directed by Clarence G. Badger, and starred Betty Compson.

== Plot ==
As described in a film magazine review, Olympe, a famous dancer, throws herself into the service of France when her country calls during World War I. She saves an American battalion from destruction when their plans are disclosed to German spies. She is wrongly judged for her work and is disgraced in the eyes of her audience. Having sacrificed her reputation for her country, she marries an American army officer and they sail for the United States.

== Cast ==
- Betty Compson as Olympe
- Wallace MacDonald as Hugh Warren
- Theodore Kosloff as De Montinbard
- Sheldon Lewis as Pugin
- Jack Joyce as Jean Bertaut
- Margaret Seddon as Widow Turrene
- Joseph J. Dowling as Senator Warren
- Helen Dunbar as Mrs. Warren
- Gale Henry as Berthe
- Marvel Quivey as Nancy
- Ed Faust as Cafe Manager

== Production ==
Cinematographer Bert Glennon was hired on to shoot an aerial battle sequence for the film, which was filmed at Clover Field in Santa Monica, CA.

== Preservation ==
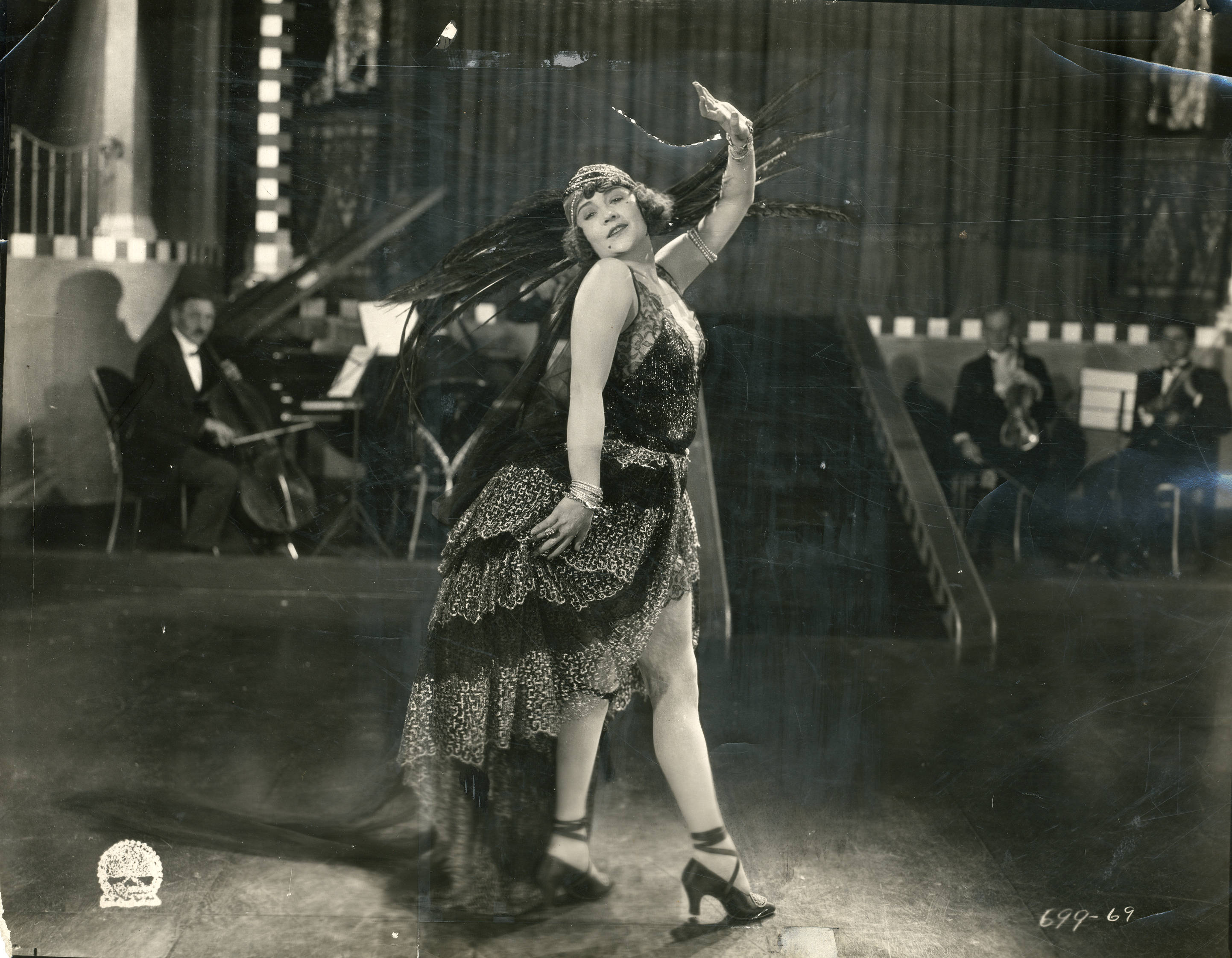
Still from the film

New Lives for Old is currently presumed lost. In February of 2021, the film was cited by the National Film Preservation Board on their Lost U.S. Silent Feature Films list.
