= The Fat Man (film) =

1951 film by William Castle

- Directed by: William Castle
- Screenplay by: Harry Essex; Leonard Lee
- Story by: Leonard Lee
- Based on: radio series created by Dashiell Hammett
- Produced by: Aubrey Schenck
- Starring: J. Scott Smart
- Cinematography: Irving Glassberg
- Edited by: Edward Curtiss
- Color process: Black and white
- Production company: Universal Pictures
- Distributed by: Universal Pictures
- Release date: May 24, 1951 (New York)
- Running time: 78 minutes
- Country: United States
- Language: English

The Fat Man is a 1951 American crime film noir directed by William Castle and starring J. Scott Smart, Rock Hudson, Julie London, Clinton Sundberg and Emmett Kelly. It is based on a radio drama of the same name, with Smart reprising his role as portly detective Brad Runyan; it was his last film prior to his death in 1960.

Originally released by Universal Pictures, the film is now in the public domain in the United States.

Castle later called the film "a potboiler of little merit, except that I was able to cast Rock Hudson ... and to use Emmett Kelly, the Ringling Brothers clown, as the villain."

== Plot ==
Portly private detective Runyan is asked by dental nurse Jane Adams to investigate the unexplained murder of her boss. Suspicion falls on disappeared patient Clark, last seen being driven from his appointment by the chauffeur of probable gangster Gordon. Runyan contacts Boyd, Clark's former lover and briefly his wife, who reveals that Clark had once spent time in jail.

The police tell Runyan that Clark's offense was the theft of half a million dollars, money that was not recovered. In jail, Clark had a cellmate named Deets, a circus clown, with whom he shared many secrets. On release, Deets had claimed Clark's share of the loot from Gordon, the heist's organizer, in order to fulfil his ambition to own his own circus.

Deet's side of the deal was to eliminate Clark, and he left the corpse in a truck that was destroyed by fire. When he realized that Clark had undergone dental treatment, creating dental records that could be used to identify him, Deets killed the dentist and Jane. Runyan locates Deets, and in a final shootout, Deets is fatally wounded and dies in his own circus ring.

== Cast ==
- J. Scott Smart as Brad Runyan
- Julie London as Pat Boyd
- Rock Hudson as Roy Clark
- Clinton Sundberg as Bill Norton
- Jayne Meadows as Nurse Jane Adams
- John Russell as Gene Gordon
- Jerome Cowan as Det. Lt. Stark
- Emmett Kelly as Ed Deets
- Lucille Barkley as Lola Gordon
- Robert Osterloh as "Fletch" Fletcher
- Harry Lewis as Happy Stevens
- Teddy Hart as Shifty

== Reception ==
In a contemporary review for The New York Times, critic A. H. Weiler wrote: "[W]hile this whodunit is sometimes as ponderous as its titular gumshoe, it proves that its heavyweight hero is a man who should be seen as well as heard. ... Mr. Smart takes the business in hand seriously, but not seriously enough not to be cheerful about matters generally. Figuratively living up to his nickname he is, at least, a novelty among screen hawkshaws."

== See also ==
- List of American films of 1951

== Soundtrack ==
- "A Dream Ago" (Music by Milton Rosen, lyrics by Everett Carter)
