= Viva Cisco Kid =

1940 film

- Theatrical release poster
- Directed by: Norman Foster
- Screenplay by: Samuel G. Engel; Hal Long
- Produced by: Sol M. Wurtzel
- Starring: Cesar Romero; Jean Rogers; Chris-Pin Martin; Minor Watson; Stanley Fields; Nigel De Brulier
- Cinematography: Charles G. Clarke
- Edited by: Norman Colbert
- Production company: 20th Century Fox
- Distributed by: 20th Century Fox
- Release date: April 12, 1940
- Running time: 65 minutes
- Country: United States
- Language: English

Viva Cisco Kid is a 1940 American Western film directed by Norman Foster, written by Samuel G. Engel and Hal Long, and starring Cesar Romero, Jean Rogers, Chris-Pin Martin, Minor Watson, Stanley Fields and Nigel De Brulier. It was released on April 12, 1940, by 20th Century Fox.

== Cast ==
- Cesar Romero as Cisco Kid
- Jean Rogers as Joan Allen
- Chris-Pin Martin as Gordito
- Minor Watson as Jesse Allen
- Stanley Fields as Boss
- Nigel De Brulier as Moses
- Harold Goodwin as Hank Gunther
- Francis Ford as Proprietor
- Charles Judels as Don Pancho
