= Secret Agent X-9 (1937 serial) =

- Directed by: Ford Beebe; Clifford Smith
- Written by: Charles Flanders; Wyndham Gittens; Norman S. Hall; Leslie Swabacker; Ray Trampe; Dashiell Hammett (comic strip)
- Produced by: Ben Koenig; Barney A. Sarecky; Henry MacRae
- Starring: Scott Kolk; Jean Rogers; David Oliver; Monte Blue; Henry Brandon
- Cinematography: Richard Fryer; Jerome Ash
- Edited by: Saul A. Goodkind; Leete Renick Brown; Joseph Gluck; Louis Sackin; Alvin Todd
- Music by: Clifford Vaughan
- Distributed by: Universal Pictures
- Release date: April 12, 1937
- Running time: 12 chapters (232 minutes)
- Country: United States
- Language: English

Secret Agent X-9 (1937) is a Universal film serial based on the comic strip Secret Agent X-9 by Dashiell Hammett and Alex Raymond.

== Plot ==
G-Men learn that "Victor Brenda", a notorious jewel thief, is heading for the US, to steal the Belgravian crown jewels currently on exhibit. The jewels are placed on a ship bound for Belgravia. However, the guard is murdered and the treasures are stolen. Agent Dexter, alias Agent X-9, trails Blackstone, one of the gang members, who hides the jewels in a safe deposit vault of a bank. He takes the bank receipt to an art shop, where Marker, a paid accomplice, conceals it between an oil painting and its frame. Dexter arrests Blackstone and pursues Marker with the full intention of unmasking Brenda.

== Cast ==
- Scott Kolk as Agent Dexter (X-9)
- Jean Rogers as Shara Graustark
- Henry Brandon as Blackstone/Victor T. Brenda
- David Oliver as Pidge
- Monte Blue as Baron Michael Karsten
- Lon Chaney Jr. as Maroni, primary henchman
- Ben Hewlett as Scarlett, primary henchman
- Larry J. Blake as Chief FBI Agent Wheeler
- Henry Hunter as FBI Agent Tommy Dawson (C-5)
- George Shelley as Packard, a henchman
- Lynn Gilbert as Rose, gun moll
- Robert Dalton as Thurston
- Leonard Lord as Ransom, dissident henchman
- Bob Kortman as "Trader" Delaney
- Eddy Waller as Lawyer Carp
- Si Jenks as "Jolly Roger", ticket barker

== Production ==
Secret Agent X-9 was based on the comic strip by Dashiell Hammett (writer) and Alex Raymond (artist).

=== Stunts ===
- George Magrill
- Eddie Parker doubling Scott Kolk
- Tom Steele doubling Henry Brandon & Jack Cheatham

== Chapter titles ==
1. Modern Pirates
2. The Ray That Blinds
3. The Man of Many Faces
4. The Listening Shadow
5. False Fires
6. The Dragnet
7. Sealed Lips
8. Exhibit A
9. The Masquerader
10. The Forced Lie
11. The Enemy Camp
12. Crime Does Not Pay

_{Source:}
