= George Oppenheimer =

American screenwriter (1900–1977)

George Seligman Oppenheimer (February 7, 1900 in New York City – August 14, 1977) was an American screenwriter, playwright, and drama critic.

== Biography ==
George S. Oppenheimer was born into a well-to-do Jewish family in New York City in 1900. He graduated from Williams College and studied at Harvard University with George Pierce Baker. Oppenheimer initially worked as an advertising publicity manager for the Alfred A. Knopf publishing house. Then in 1925, he and Harold Guinzburg co-founded Viking Press, but Oppenheimer discovered he was more interested in writing for the stage. He co-authored the 1927 musical revue, The Manhatters, and wrote all of its song lyrics. He enjoyed further Broadway success in 1932 with his farce, Here Today, starring Ruth Gordon and billed as a "comedy of bad manners".

Next, Oppenheimer left for Hollywood to work as a screenwriter. His first credit was providing additional material to the Samuel Goldwyn-produced musical comedy, Roman Scandals (1933). For the rest of the decade, Oppenheimer was employed by MGM, primarily as a script doctor, rewriting or polishing existing scripts. He co-wrote the Marx Brothers film A Day at the Races (1937). A career milestone was his Oscar nomination for Best Original Screenplay for The War Against Mrs. Hadley (1942).

Oppenheimer, a homosexual, never married. He was the occasional sexual partner of the young Harry Hay. After the pair reportedly met in 1935 on the corner of Hollywood and Vine, Oppenheimer was said to be fearful that the indiscreet Hay might reveal their relationship.

In World War II, Oppenheimer joined the U.S. Army Air Forces and was stationed in India. After the war, he became a writer in the new field of television. He wrote the pilot and 29 episodes of the popular TV series, Topper.

By the 1950s, he had moved back to New York. He was hired by Newsday in 1955 to write the weekly "On Stage" column. He became the newspaper's daily critic in 1963, and was named Sunday drama critic in 1972. From 1969 to 1971, he was president of the New York Drama Critics' Circle. His contributions to the theater were recognized by the Newsday George Oppenheimer Award, which was given annually from 1979 to 2007 to the best New York debut production by an American playwright for a non-musical play.

George Oppenheimer died in New York City on August 14, 1977. He was 77.

== Selected filmography ==
- Roman Scandals (1933)
- Rendezvous (1935)
- Libeled Lady (1936)
- We Went to College (1936)
- London by Night (1937)
- The Last of Mrs. Cheyney (1937)
- Married Before Breakfast (1937)
- I'll Take Romance (1937)
- A Day at the Races (1937)
- Three Loves Has Nancy (1938)
- The Crowd Roars (1938)
- A Yank at Oxford (1938)
- Paradise for Three (1938)
- Man-Proof (1938)
- Honolulu (1939)
- Broadway Melody of 1940 (1940)
- I Love You Again (1940)
- Two-Faced Woman (1941)
- The Big Store (1941)
- The Feminine Touch (1941)
- The War Against Mrs. Hadley (1942)
- Pacific Rendezvous (1942)
- A Yank at Eton (1942)
- Slightly Dangerous (1943)
- The Youngest Profession (1943)
- Killer McCoy (1947)
- Adventures of Don Juan (1948)
- Born to Be Bad (1950)
- Perfect Strangers (1950)
- Anything Can Happen (1952)
- Decameron Nights (1953)
- Tonight We Sing (1953)

== Books ==
- Oppenheimer, George, ed. (1958). The Passionate Playgoer. A Personal Scrapbook. Viking Press. LCCN 58012377.
- Oppenheimer, George (1966). The View from the Sixties: Memories of a Spent Life. David McKay. OCLC 475655066.
- Oppenheimer, George, ed. (1970). Frank Sullivan Through the Looking Glass: A Collection of His Letters and Pieces. Doubleday. LCCN 72111180.
- Oppenheimer, George, ed. (1973). The Best in the World: A Selection of News and Feature Stories, Editorials, Humor, Poems, and Reviews from 1921 to 1928. Viking Press. ISBN 0670159158. Co-edited with John K. Hutchens.
