= Women in Prison (film) =

- Theatrical release poster
- Directed by: Lambert Hillyer
- Written by: Saul Elkins; Mortimer Braus
- Produced by: Irving Briskin; Wallace MacDonald
- Starring: Wyn Cahoon; Scott Kolk; Arthur Loft
- Cinematography: Benjamin Kline
- Edited by: Dick Fantl
- Music by: Morris Stoloff
- Production company: Columbia Pictures
- Distributed by: Columbia Pictures
- Release date: March 2, 1938
- Running time: 59 minutes
- Country: United States
- Language: English

Women in Prison is a 1938 American crime melodrama film directed by Lambert Hillyer. It was produced by Columbia Pictures.

== Cast ==
- Wynn Cahoon as Ann Wilson
- Scott Kolk as Bob Wayne
- Arthur Norton as Barney Morse
- Mayo Methot as Daisy Saunders
- Ann Doran as Maggie
- Sarah Padden as Martha Wilson
- Margaret Armstrong as Mrs. Tatum
- John Tyrrell as Jerry Banks
- Bess Flowers as Florence
- Dick Curtis as Mac

== Reception ==
A review from Variety criticized Wyn Cahoon's performance, calling it unimpressive.
