= The Cremators =

- Theatrical release poster
- Directed by: Harry Essex
- Written by: Harry Essex
- Based on: the short story Dune Roller by Julian May
- Produced by: Harry Essex
- Starring: Maria de Aragon; Marvin Howard
- Music by: Albert Glasser
- Distributed by: New World Pictures
- Release date: October 1972
- Running time: 75 minutes
- Country: United States
- Language: English
- Budget: $50,000

The Cremators is a 1972 science fiction horror film. It was one of the first movies from special effects expert Doug Beswick.

== Plot ==
An alien life form that is a huge ball of living matter invades Earth, and replenishes itself by absorbing people.

== See also ==
- The Cremator, World War II Czechoslovak conscience film, Turner Classic Movies, 07/08/2019
