= Conflict (1936 film) =

1936 film

- Film poster
- Directed by: David Howard
- Screenplay by: Charles A. Logue; Walter Weems
- Based on: The Abysmal Brute; 1913 novel by Jack London
- Produced by: Trem Carr; Paul Malvern
- Starring: John Wayne; Jean Rogers; Ward Bond; Tommy Bupp; Bryant Washburn; Frank Sheridan; Harry Woods; Margaret Mann
- Cinematography: Archie Stout
- Edited by: Erma Horsley; Jack Ogilvie
- Music by: Charles Previn
- Production company: Universal Pictures
- Distributed by: Universal Pictures
- Release date: November 29, 1936
- Running time: 60 minutes
- Country: United States
- Language: English

Conflict is a 1936 American drama sport film directed by David Howard and starring John Wayne, Ward Bond and Jean Rogers.

== Plot ==
Pat Glendon is a former lumberjack turned bare-knuckle boxer who travels the countryside as part of gambling scam operated by Gus "Knockout" Carrigan for a New York City syndicate. Glendon arrives ahead of the travelling boxing exhibition, building the confidence of the locals who in turn bet on Glendon to win, only to have him throw the fight.

The gambling circuit leads Glendon to Cedar City, a west coast lumber town where he soon finds himself a job as a lumberjack and becoming part of the community. At the lumberjack picnic Glendon fights and defeats "Ruffhouse" Kelly, a burly man from a rival lumber camp. The town folk agree that Glendon is the one to represent them in the boxing exhibition soon to hit town.

While in Cedar City, Glendon saves the life of a runaway orphan, Tommy, who befriends the boxer and acts as his "trainer" and is unofficially adopted by him. Maude Sangster, a reporter pretending to be a social worker from San Francisco sent to Cedar City to expose the boxing scam, befriends Glendon and the orphan Tommy.

Conscience gets the better of Glendon, and on the day of the rigged fight against Carrigan, Glendon tells him that he won't throw the fight. He tells Carrigan that the Cedar City lumberjacks are his friends and he doesn't want to scam them out of their hard earned money. In a hard-fought, honest match, Glendon prevails and also wins the heart of the girl.

== Cast ==
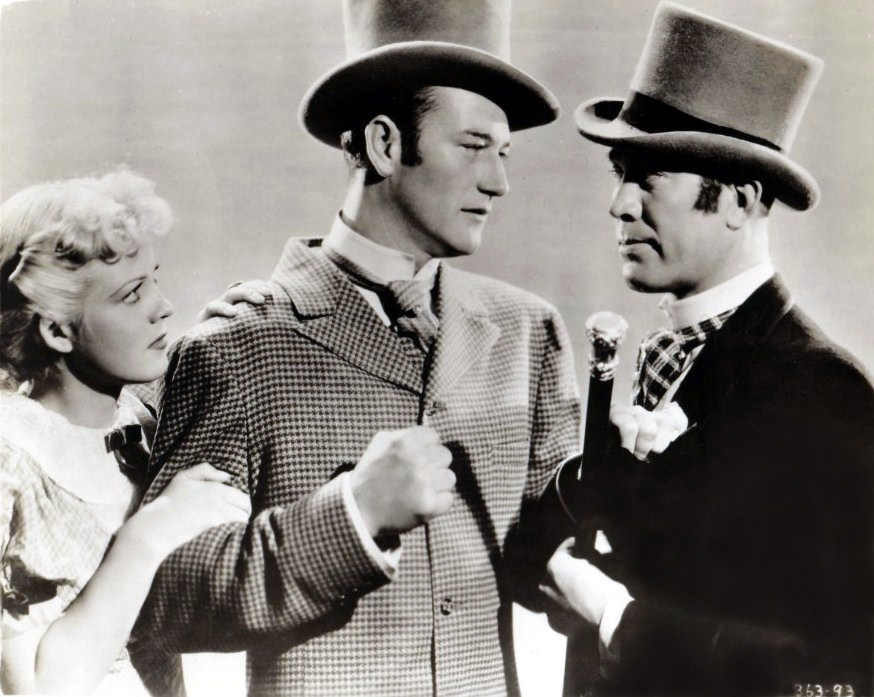
Jean Rogers, John Wayne, and Ward Bond in Conflict

- John Wayne as Pat Glendon
- Jean Rogers as Maude Sangster
- Ward Bond as Gus "Knockout" Carrigan
- Tommy Bupp as Tommy
- Bryant Washburn as City Editor
- Frank Sheridan as Sam Steubner
- Harry Woods as "Ruffhouse" Kelly
- Margaret Mann as Ma Blake
- Eddie Borden as "Spider" Welsh
- Frank Hagney as Mike Malone
- Lloyd Ingraham as Adams, Newspaper City Editor

== Production ==
The railroad scenes were filmed on the Sierra Railroad in Tuolumne County, California.

== See also ==
- List of boxing films
- John Wayne filmography
