= The Wildcatter =

Film directed by Lewis D. Collins

- Theatrical release poster
- Directed by: Lewis D. Collins
- Screenplay by: Charles Logue
- Story by: Tom Van Dycke
- Produced by: George Owen
- Starring: Scott Kolk; Jean Rogers; J. Scott Smart; Suzanne Kaaren; Russell Hicks; Ward Bond; Wallis Clark; Jack Powell
- Cinematography: Stanley Cortez
- Edited by: Frank Gross
- Production company: Universal Pictures
- Distributed by: Universal Pictures
- Release date: June 6, 1937
- Running time: 58 minutes
- Country: United States
- Language: English

The Wildcatter is a 1937 American drama film directed by Lewis D. Collins and written by Charles Logue. The film stars Scott Kolk, Jean Rogers, J. Scott Smart, Suzanne Kaaren, Russell Hicks, Ward Bond, Wallis Clark and Jack Powell. The film was released on June 6, 1937, by Universal Pictures.

== Cast ==
- Scott Kolk as 'Lucky' Conlon
- Jean Rogers as Helen Conlon
- J. Scott Smart as Smiley
- Suzanne Kaaren as Julia Frayne
- Russell Hicks as Tom Frayne
- Ward Bond as Johnson
- Wallis Clark as Torrance
- Jack Powell as Joe Tinker
- Milburn Stone as Ed
- William Gould as Real Estate Agent
- Robert McKenzie as Bill Webster
