= Hold Your Man (1929 film) =

1929 film

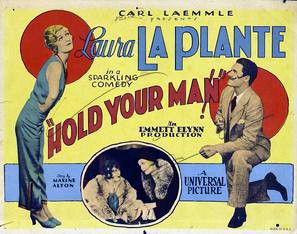
- Directed by: Emmett J. Flynn
- Screenplay by: Harold Shumate
- Story by: Maxine Alton
- Starring: Laura La Plante; Scott Kolk; Eugene Borden; Mildred Van Dorn
- Cinematography: Gilbert Warrenton
- Edited by: John English
- Production company: Universal Pictures
- Distributed by: Universal Pictures
- Release date: September 15, 1929
- Running time: 60 minutes
- Country: United States
- Language: English

Hold Your Man is a 1929 American comedy film directed by Emmett J. Flynn and written by Harold Shumate. The film stars Laura La Plante, Scott Kolk, Eugene Borden and Mildred Van Dorn. The film was released on September 15, 1929, by Universal Pictures.

== Cast ==
- Laura La Plante as Mary
- Scott Kolk as Jack
- Eugene Borden as Beno
- Mildred Van Dorn as Rhea
- Walter F. Scott
