= Design for Scandal =

1941 film by Norman Taurog

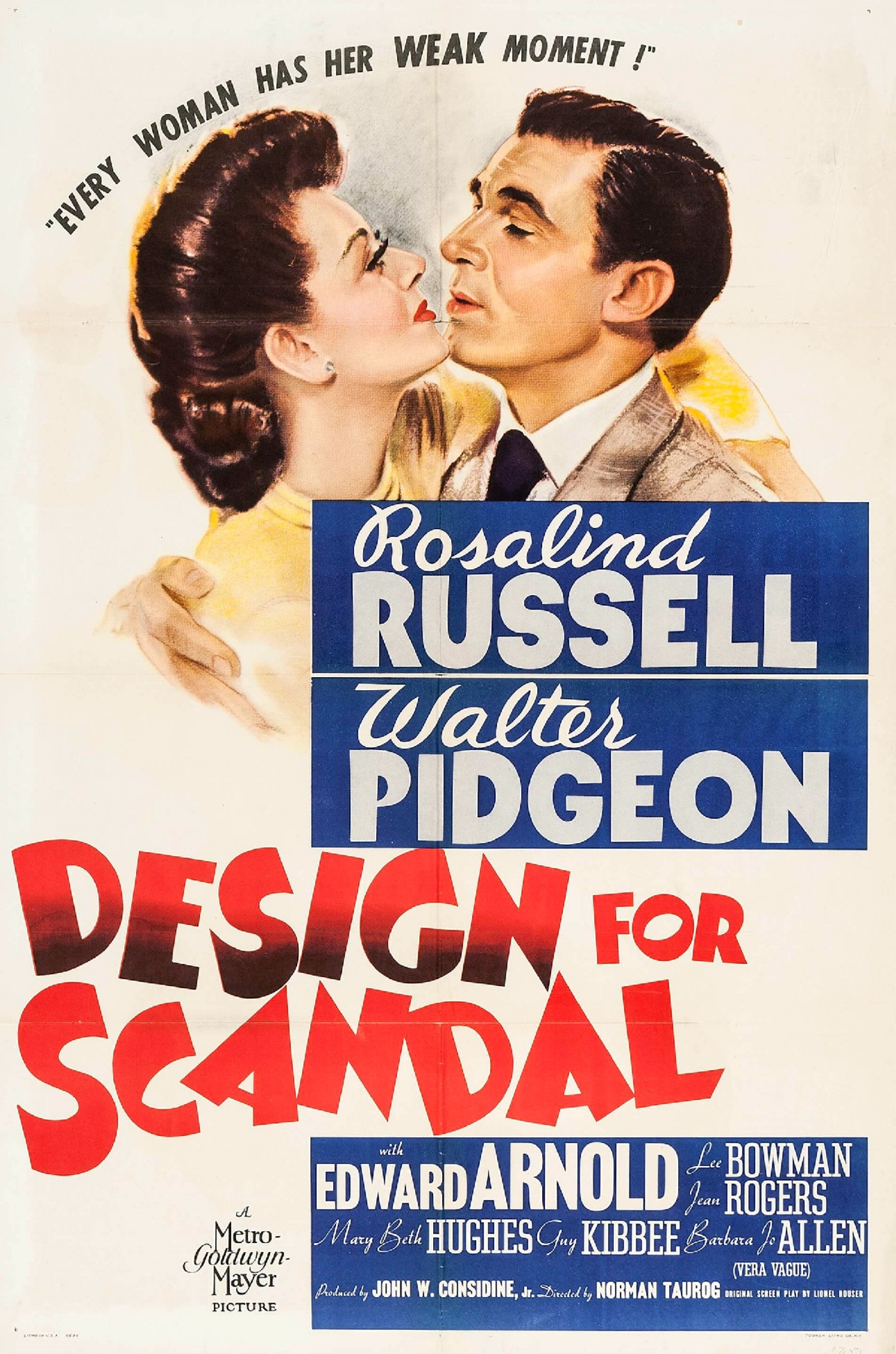
- Film poster
- Directed by: Norman Taurog
- Written by: Lionel Houser
- Produced by: John W. Considine Jr.
- Starring: Rosalind Russell; Walter Pidgeon; Edward Arnold
- Cinematography: William H. Daniels; Leonard Smith
- Edited by: Elmo Veron
- Music by: Franz Waxman
- Production company: Metro-Goldwyn-Mayer
- Distributed by: Loew's Inc.
- Release date: December 1941
- Running time: 85 minutes
- Country: United States
- Language: English
- Budget: $558,000
- Box office: $1,057,000

Design for Scandal is a 1941 American romantic comedy film directed by Norman Taurog and starring Rosalind Russell, Walter Pidgeon and Edward Arnold. It was produced by Metro-Goldwyn-Mayer. Russell stars as a judge targeted by a newspaper tycoon unhappy with her decision in his divorce case.

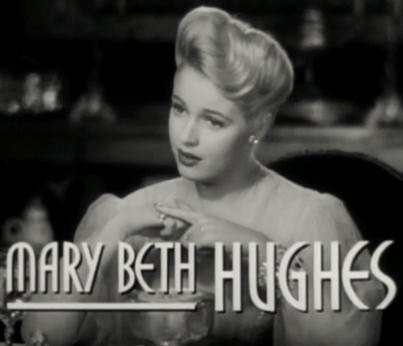
Mary Beth Hughes in the film trailer

== Plot ==
When wealthy newspaper publisher Judson M. Blair divorces his wife Adele, judge Cornelia C. Porter awards Adele alimony of $4,000 per month for five years or until she remarries. After learning from his lawyer Northcott that Porter refuses to hear an appeal, Blair is furious and unsuccessfully tries to wield his influence with Porter's boss Judge Graham to have Porter transferred.

Reporter Jeff Sherman, recently fired by Blair, offers a solution in exchange for a promotion, a raise, a bonus and an unlimited expense account. Blair accedes to all of his demands. Sherman convinces his manicurist girlfriend Dotty to pretend to agree to marry him in the near future. He then tries to romance Porter, intending to threaten her with an alienation-of-affections scandal to force her to reduce Blair's alimony burden.

When Porter takes a two-month vacation, Sherman follows her. Having researched Porter's interests, Sherman pretends to be a sculptor. To obtain an artist's studio in the fully booked resort town, Sherman persuades sculptor Alexander Raoul that Blair has offered him a commission to decorate his building. Sherman then begins to woo Porter. She considers him a nuisance, but he is eventually able to win her love. To his dismay, he finds that he has fallen for her as well.

Porter learns about the scheme before Sherman can confess, and has both Blair and Sherman arrested. At their trial, Sherman acts as his own lawyer and calls Porter to the witness stand, where he asks her to marry him. Under oath, she is forced to admit that she did love him at one point, and she runs out in tears. When Sherman chases after her, he is knocked down. Believing that he has been hurt, Porter rushes back to him, and they are reconciled. Blair becomes irate when he discovers that after he had convinced his ex-wife to agree to a lump-sum settlement, she promptly married another wealthy magnate.

== Cast ==
- Rosalind Russell as Judge Cornelia C. Porter
- Walter Pidgeon as Jeff Sherman
- Edward Arnold as Judson M. Blair
- Lee Bowman as Walter Caldwell, Porter's coworker and admirer
- Jean Rogers as Dotty
- Mary Beth Hughes as Adele Blair
- Guy Kibbee as Judge Graham
- Barbara Jo Allen as Jane, Porter's sister
- Leon Belasco as Alexander Raoul
- Bobby Larson as Freddie, Porter's nephew
- Charles Coleman as Wilton
- Thurston Hall as Northcott
- Anne Revere as Porter's Maid, Nettie
- George Chandler as Taxi Cab Driver

== Box office ==
According to MGM records, the film earned $659,000 in the U.S. and Canada and $398,000 elsewhere, resulting in a profit of $139,000.
