= Jesse Greer =

American songwriter

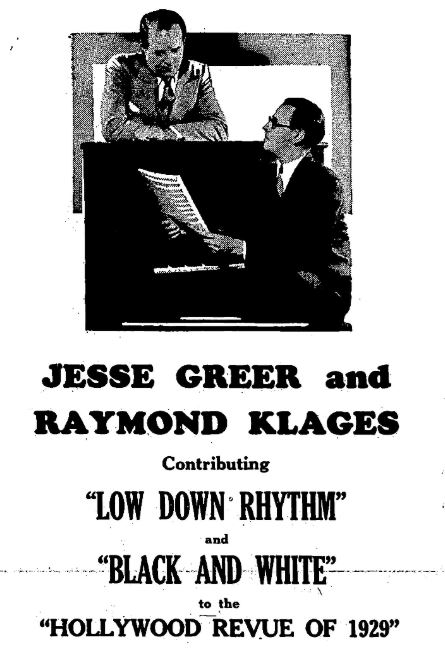
Ad with Jesse Greer and Raymond Klages for the film The Hollywood Revue of 1929

Jesse Greer (August 26, 1896, New York City – October 3, 1970, Columbia, Connecticut) was an American Broadway songwriter. His musical Shady Lady was staged in 1933 with additional music by Sam H. Stept. Greer composed "Just You, Just Me" for the 1929 musical film Marianne with lyrics by Raymond Klages, as well as "Kitty from Kansas City", "Gonna Meet My Sweetie Now", "Climbing Up the Ladder of Love", "Spellbound", "Flapperette", "Freshie", "What Do I Care", "Sleepy Head", "Once in a Lifetime", and "Baby Blue Eyes".

The Dining Hall of the June Norcross Webster Scout Reservation in Ashford, Connecticut, is named in his honor. Greer was an early financial contributor to the Boy Scouts of America and would often visit the camp until his death. The Camp Staff would sing "The Hills of My Connecticut" upon his arrival.

The Greer Music Library at Connecticut College is named in his honor and was funded by a $50,000 gift from Jesse and his wife Josephine Lauter Greer through the Lauter Foundation. Their Jesse Greer Sheet Music Collection contains over 100 songs that he composed.
