= J. Scott Smart =

American actor (1902–1960)

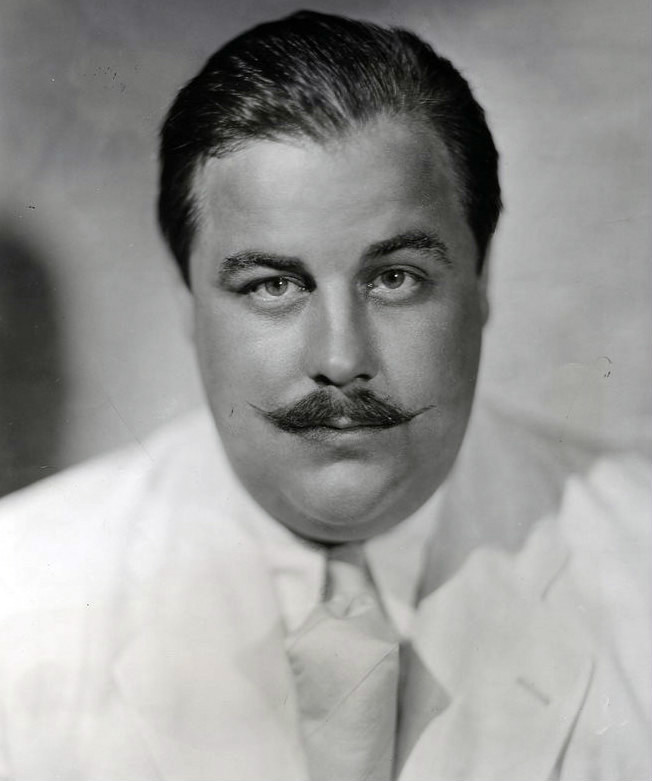
- Smart in 1933
- Born: November 27, 1902; Philadelphia, Pennsylvania
- Died: January 15, 1960 (aged 57); Springfield, Illinois
- Other name: Jack Smart
- Occupation: Actor
- Spouses: Alice Coy Wright (m. 1931, divorced) Mary-Leigh Call (m. 1951)

J. Scott Smart (born John Kenley Tener Smart, November 27, 1902 – January 15, 1960) was an American radio, film and stage actor during the 1930s, 1940s and early 1950s.

== Early years ==
Born in Philadelphia, Pennsylvania on November 27, 1902 and his family later moved to Buffalo, New York, where he was a 1922 graduate of Lafayette High School. He also attended the Miami Military Institute.

Smart told a reporter that before entering show business, he held thirty jobs in three years, including selling shoe polish, heaving coal on a boat, being a fire chief in a factory, drawing cartoons for a newspaper, and designing ads for an advertising agency.

== Career ==
When he was twenty-one, Smart began acting in stock theater in Buffalo. He acted there for five years. After that, a friend set up an audition for a program on NBC. The result was Smart's first role on radio, that of a singing waiter on Whispering Tables. His Broadway credits include A Bell for Adano (1944) and Separate Rooms (1939).

Smart is best known for his lead as Brad Runyon in the detective show The Fat Man, which aired on ABC Radio from 1946 to 1951. (See Laughlin 1994, Dunning 1976, Buxton and Owen 1996.) A regular on The March of Time and The Fred Allen Show, he played so many character roles during the early days of radio drama that he became known as the "Lon Chaney of Radio". He was also an accomplished stage actor and played roles in major productions of A Bell For Adano and Waiting for Godot. He appeared in many movies, including Kiss of Death and the movie version of The Fat Man. In his later life, Smart's roles in radio programs included those shown in the table below.

Program	Role
Blondie	Mr. Fuddle
Joe and Ethel Turp	Uncle Ben (as Jack Smart)
Meet Mr. Meek	Uncle Louie (as Jack Smart)
Mr. and Mrs.	Joe (as Jack Smart)
Nine to Five	J. Aubrey Bloomer, Jr. (as Jack Smart)
The Top Guy	Police commissioner
The Wonder Show	Owner

He was also a member of the casts of The Family Hour and The Teen-Timers Club and was heard frequently on Grand Central Station and Inner Sanctum Mystery.

== Personal life ==
Smart married Alice Coy Wright on July 23, 1931. He was married to Mary-Leigh Smart from 1951 until his death in 1960. They had no children, but were an established part of the local arts community in Ogunquit, Maine.

== Later years ==
Smart continued to live in Ogunquit, where he directed a summer theater. He also became a painter and sculptor.

== Death ==
Smart died of pancreatic cancer in Springfield, Illinois.

== Filmography ==
Year	Title	Role	Notes
1936	Three Smart Girls	Newspaper Editor on Phone	Uncredited
1937	Girl Overboard	Wilbur Jenkins	
1937	Top of the Town	Beaton	
1937	When Love Is Young	Winthrop Grove	
1937	The Wildcatter	Smiley	
1937	Love in a Bungalow	Wilbur Babcock	
1937	One Hundred Men and a Girl	Stage Doorman	
1937	That's My Story	Henchman	
1938	Cipher Bureau	Carlson	Uncredited
1939	Panama Patrol	Eli Maing	
1939	Some Like It Hot	Joe - Hamburger Man	
1939	Million Dollar Legs	Splash Gordon, Sweet Shop Owner	Uncredited
1940	Johnny Apollo	Leader of Conga	Uncredited
1943	The Adventures of Smilin' Jack	Japanese Colonel	Serial, Uncredited
1945	Danger Signal	Mrs. Crockett's Roomer	Uncredited
1946	Shadow of a Woman	Timothy Freeman	
1947	Kiss of Death		Uncredited
1947	That Hagen Girl	Man in Drugstore	Uncredited
1948	Embraceable You	Minor Role	(scenes deleted)
1951	The Fat Man	Brad Runyan	

== Listen to ==
- Internet Archive: The Fat Man (29 episodes) Note: Only the last six episodes in this archive are from the original American J. Scott Smart series; the rest are from the Australian series.
