= William Kozlenko =

Editor and playwright

William Kozlenko was an American playwright, screenwriter, and editor of multiple stage-play compilations and anthologies, as well as being a founding editor of One-Act Play Magazine, which published from 1937–1942, and a co-founder of the One-Act Repertory Theater. His best-known editorial compilations include The Disputed Works of William Shakespeare and the 1938 collection The Best Short Plays of the Social Theater, which included contemporary works such as Clifford Odets' Waiting for Lefty, Marc Blitzstein's The Cradle Will Rock, and W.H. Auden's and Christopher Isherwood's The Dog Beneath the Skin.
