= Marianne (1929 musical film) =

1929 American romantic musical drama film

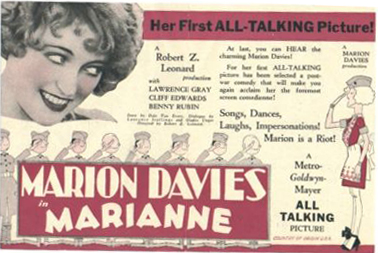
- Directed by: Robert Z. Leonard
- Written by: Laurence Stallings; Gladys Unger; Dale Van Every (also story)
- Produced by: Marion Davies; Robert Z. Leonard
- Starring: Marion Davies
- Cinematography: Oliver T. Marsh
- Edited by: James C. McKay; Basil Wrangell
- Music by: William Axt; Charles Maxwell
- Production company: Cosmopolitan Productions
- Distributed by: Metro-Goldwyn-Mayer
- Release date: August 24, 1929
- Running time: 111 minutes (sound)
- Country: United States
- Languages: English and French

Marianne is a 1929 American pre-Code romantic-musical film set at the end of World War I. Marianne is French farm girl who, although her French fiancé is away, fighting, falls in love with an American soldier. It is a remake of a silent film that was released earlier in 1929. Although the films feature mostly different casts, Marion Davies starred in both versions. This was Davies' first released talking movie. The pictures were released less than eleven years after the Armistice, and the title would have had a profound meaning for European audiences. “Marianne” has been a beloved personification of France and the battle for democracy—and the courage of French women in particular—since the Revolution. She was a key figure in French propaganda, and American men who served in Europe in 1917-1918 would have seen representations of her all around them, in public buildings, on posters and in newspapers, on coins and postage stamps.

== Plot ==
Marianne (full film)

== Cast ==
- Marion Davies as Marianne
- Lawrence Gray as Private Stagg
- Cliff Edwards as "Soapy" Soapstone
- Benny Rubin as Sam "Sammy" Samuels
- George Baxter as André
- Scott Kolk as Lieutenant Frane
- Robert Edeson as The General
- Émile Chautard as Père Joseph

== Music ==
The song “Just You, Just Me”, composed by Jesse Greer, with lyrics by Raymond Klages, was introduced in this film by Lawrence Gray, playing the ukulele, and Marion Davies in a comic reprise. It quickly became a standard, and has been covered by countless performers through almost a century. Greer and Klages also wrote “Hang on to Me”. They are given on-screen credits for “Interpolations”, along with Nacio Herb Brown and Arthur Freed, who wrote “Blondy”.

The “Music and Lyrics” credit goes to Roy Turk and Fred E Ahlert, who were responsible for “Marianne”, “When I See My Sugar”, “Oo-la-la-la-la” and “The Girl from Noochateau”. All these songs were composed in 1929.

Songs popularized during the war include: “Oh! Frenchy”, music by Con Conrad and words by Sam Ehrlich. “Where Do We Go From Here?.” by Howard Johnson and Percy Renrich.

== Reception ==
Mordaunt Hall of the New York Times gave the film a lukewarm review, stating "As a quasi-musical comedy plot it is entertaining, but as a story its comedy is far from fresh." He also noted that the film was "by no means a production that is suited to Miss Davies's talents."

== See also ==
- List of early sound feature films (1926–1929)
