= Herbert Yardley =

American cryptologist (1889–1958)

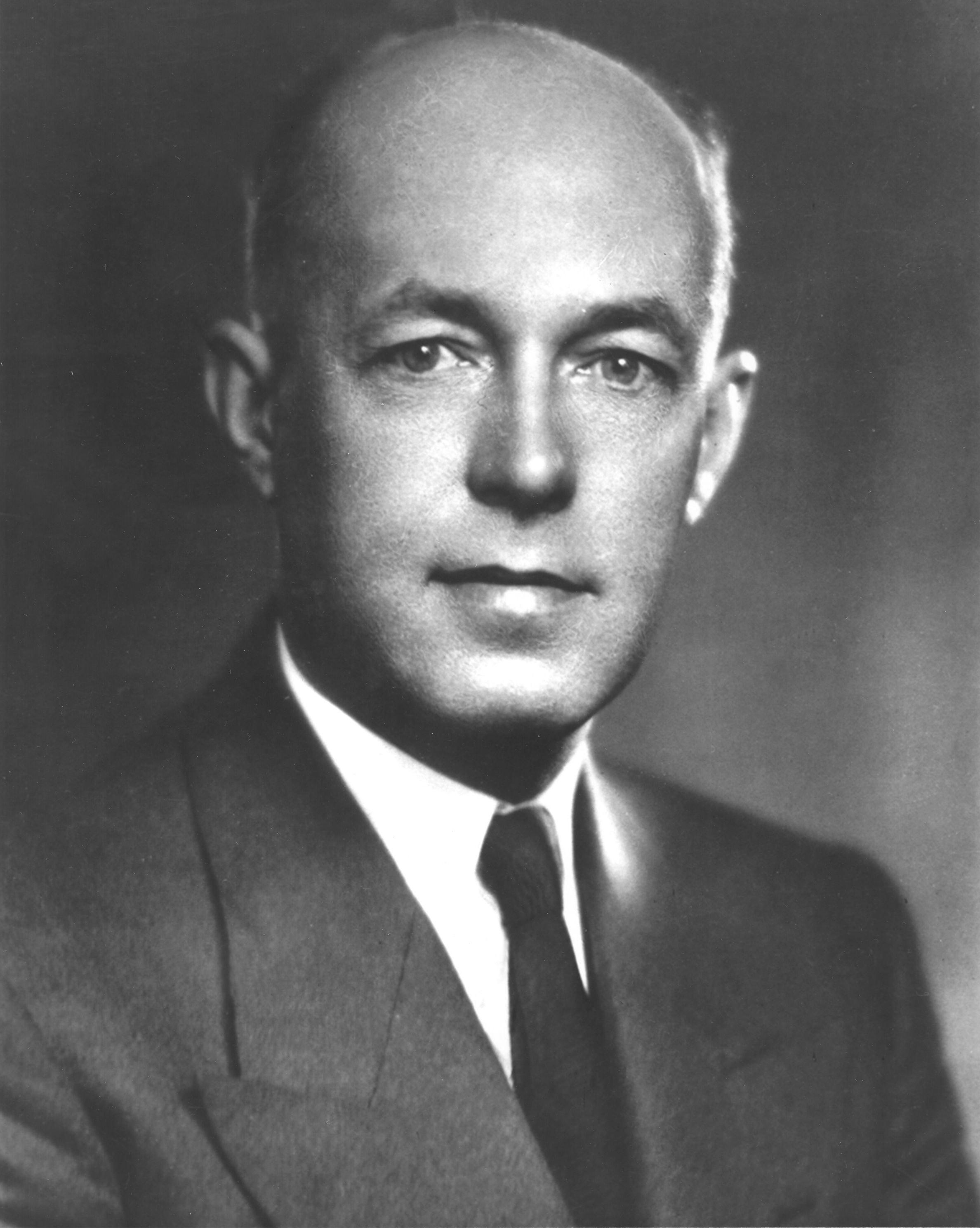
- Born: Herbert Osborn Yardley; April 13, 1889; Worthington, Indiana, U.S.
- Died: August 7, 1958 (aged 69); Washington, D.C., U.S.
- Scientific career
- Fields: Cryptology

Herbert Osborn Yardley (April 13, 1889 – August 7, 1958) was an American cryptologist. He founded and led the Black Chamber, the US government's first peacetime cryptanalytic organization. Under Yardley, the cryptanalysts of the Black Chamber broke Japanese diplomatic codes and were able to furnish American negotiators with significant information during the Washington Naval Conference of 1921–1922.

He was a Recipient of the Distinguished Service Medal. In 1931 Yardley wrote the book The American Black Chamber about his experiences there. He later helped the Nationalists in China (1938–1940) to break Japanese codes. Following his work in China, Yardley worked briefly for the Canadian government, helping it set up a cryptological section (Examination Unit) of the National Research Council of Canada from June to December 1941. Yardley was reportedly let go due to pressure either from the Secretary of War Henry L. Stimson or from the British.

== Early life ==
Yardley was born in 1889 in Worthington, Indiana. He learned to use the telegraph from his father, Robert Kirkbride Yardley, a station master and telegrapher for a railroad. His mother, Mary Emma Osborn Yardley, died when he was 13.

After graduation from high school in 1907, Yardley went to the University of Chicago, but dropped out after one year and went back to Worthington, where he worked as a telegrapher for a railroad. He spent his free time learning how to play poker and applied his winnings towards his further schooling. In 1912, after passing the civil service exam, he was hired as a government telegrapher.

Yardley began his career as a code clerk in the U.S. State Department. He accepted a Signal Corps Reserve commission and served as a cryptologic officer with the American Expeditionary Forces in France during World War I.

== Codebreaking ==
His career in cryptology began with his work in the code room, as he broke the U.S. government codes that crossed his desk. At that time, American codes were very weak and Yardley solved them easily. He was shocked to learn that President Wilson was using a code that had been in use for over ten years. The weakness of American codes worried Yardley, especially considering the war in Europe, so in May 1916 he began writing a hundred-page "Solution of American Diplomatic Codes", which he gave to his boss.

Breaking American codes got Yardley wondering about the codes of other countries. American participation in the war gave Yardley an opportunity to convince Major Ralph Van Deman of the need to set up a section to break other countries' codes. In June 1917, Yardley became a 2nd lieutenant in the Signal Corps and head of the newly created eighth section of military intelligence, MI-8. One early case was the cryptogram discovered in the clothing of German spy Lothar Witzke after he was arrested at the Mexican border in 1918. The evidence linked Witzke to significant sabotage activity in the U.S.

Yardley proved to be a very good administrator and during the war the people of MI-8 performed well even if they did not have any spectacular successes. After the war, the American Army and the State department decided to jointly fund MI-8 and Yardley continued as head of the "Cipher Bureau". They located their operations in New York City for legal reasons.

Cracking Japanese codes was a priority. David Kahn states:

The most important target was Japan. Its belligerence toward China jeopardized America's Open Door policy. Its emigrants exacerbated American racism. Its naval growth menaced American power in the western Pacific. Its commercial expansion threatened American dominance of Far Eastern markets.

After almost a year, Yardley and his staff finally managed to break the Japanese codes and were still reading Japanese diplomatic traffic when Washington hosted the Washington Naval Conference in 1921. The information the Cipher Bureau provided the American delegation regarding the Japanese government's absolute minimum acceptable battleship requirements was instrumental in getting the Japanese side to agree to a 5:3 ratio instead of the 10:7 ratio the Japanese Navy really wanted. This allowed Japan only 18 battleships to 30 for the U.S. and 30 for Great Britain instead of the 21 battleships Japan desired. This was the height of Yardley's cryptanalytic career.

Unfortunately, Yardley spent much of his time in New York involved in unrelated activities. Also, the flow of diplomatic telegrams dried up as companies became less willing to break the law to help the government. In Washington, William Friedman was actively exploring cryptographic frontiers for the Army. The Cipher Bureau was becoming irrelevant. Herbert Hoover's Secretary of State, Henry L. Stimson, closed the Cipher Bureau, likely for budgetary reasons. But Stimson was also ethically opposed to cryptology in peace time. Upon finding out about Yardley and the Cipher Bureau, Stimson was furious and withdrew funding, summing up his argument with "Gentlemen do not read each other's mail." Some believe that Stimson was most offended when Yardley bragged that he could read all traffic of the Vatican, for it was after this remark that Stimson turned and left the room.

In 1929, President Herbert E. Hoover's new secretary of state, Henry L. Stimson, was provided with a few selected translations so he could become acquainted with the Black Chamber's skills. Stimson was shocked. "Gentlemen," he later pronounced, "do not read each other's mail." Having solved the codes of some 20 nations, the Black Chamber was forced to shut down.

== The American Black Chamber ==
MI-8 closed its doors for good on October 31, 1929, just two days after the stock market crashed. With Yardley's esoteric skills in very low demand, and no government pension due to his secretly funded work, he took up writing about his experiences in codebreaking to support his family. His memoirs, The American Black Chamber, were published by Bobbs-Merrill in 1931. The book outlined the history of the first U.S. Signals Intelligence (SIGINT) organization, described the activities of MI-8 during World War I and the American Black Chamber in the 1920s, and illustrated the basic principles of signals security.

This work was instantly popular. Its critics at the time concluded that it was "the most sensational contribution to the secret history of the war, as well as the immediate post-war period, which has yet been written by an American. Its deliberate indiscretions exceed any to be found in the recent memoirs of European secret agents." In the U.S., 17,931 copies were sold, with 5,480 more sold in the U.K. It was translated into French, Swedish, Japanese, and Chinese. The Japanese version sold an unprecedented 33,119 copies.

This book was an embarrassment to the U.S. government and compromised some of the sources Yardley and his associates used. Through this work an estimated 19 nations were alerted that their codes were broken. Much of the post-World War I codebreaking was done by obtaining copies of enciphered telegrams sent over Western Union by foreign diplomats, as was the custom before countries had technology for specialized communications devices. William F. Friedman, considered the father of modern American signals intelligence (SIGINT) gathering, was incensed by the book and the publicity it generated in part because sources and methods were compromised and because Yardley's contribution was overstated.

While Yardley may have thought that publishing this book would force the government to re-establish a SIGINT program, it had the opposite effect. The U.S. government considered prosecuting him, but he had not technically violated existing law regarding protection of government records. In 1933, the Espionage Act was amended, PL 37 (USC Title 18, section 952), to prohibit the disclosure of foreign code or anything sent in code. Yardley's second book, Japanese Diplomatic Codes: 1921-1922, was seized by U.S. marshals and never published. The manuscript was declassified in 1979.

The American Black Chamber represents an early example of the exposé national security books that would appear after World War II, such as The Codebreakers and The Puzzle Palace, which also focus on U.S. SIGINT operations and organizations.

In 1935, Metro-Goldwyn-Mayer released Rendezvous, a fictional film "based on a book by Herbert O. Yardley." The film, starring William Powell and Rosalind Russell, and directed by William K. Howard, concerns a German spy ring stealing U.S. government codes during World War I, as well as U.S. Army efforts to crack German codes.

James Bamford devoted an entire chapter of The Puzzle Palace to an account of Yardley's career. Previous accounts of Yardley's career had said that the publication American Black Chamber, in Japan, had been one of the key triggers to Japanese militarism, because it exposed how American codebreakers had helped force Japan to accept an unfairly small limitation on its Naval tonnage. Bamford revealed that the book was even more infuriating to key Japanese militarists, because, prior to its publication Japanese military intelligence had paid him a fortune for the same information he published for the whole world to see.

== Later life ==
Yardley did cryptologic work for Canada (although pressure from the US on the Canadian government meant it was limited) and China during World War II, but he was never again given a position of trust in the US government. Still, in 1999 he was given a place in the National Security Agency Hall of Honor.

None of Yardley's many later attempts at writing was as successful as The American Black Chamber, but he published several articles and three spy/mystery novels (The Blonde Countess, Red Sun of Nippon, and Crows Are Black Everywhere). He contributed as a writer and technical advisor to several movies, including Rendezvous, based very loosely on one of his novels, The Blonde Countess. His 1957 book on poker, Education of a Poker Player, which combined poker stories with the math behind the poker strategies, sold well. When it was published in the UK in 1959, Ian Fleming was asked to write a preface. Another book of cryptographic memoirs, The Chinese Black Chamber, about his work in China, was declassified and published in 1983.

In August 1958, Yardley died in Washington, D.C., nearly a week after having a major stroke. He is buried at Arlington National Cemetery, Grave 429-1 of Section 30.

Yardley is a member of the Military Intelligence Hall of Fame.

The National Cryptologic Museum's library has 16 boxes of intercepted messages and translations from the Cipher Bureau, previously misidentified as Yardley's personal papers.

== Bibliography ==
- 4 April 1931 Saturday Evening Post (article)

- "Secret Inks." Saturday Evening Post, 4 April 1931.

- 18 April 1931 Saturday Evening Post (article)

- "Codes." Saturday Evening Post, 18 April 1931.

- 9 May 1931 Saturday Evening Post (article)

- "Ciphers." Saturday Evening Post, 9 May 1931.

- 1 June 1931 The American Black Chamber (book) (with William F. Friedman's margin notes)

- The American Black Chamber, 1931.
- Indianapolis: The Bobbs-Merrill Co., 1931.
- New York City: Blue Ribbon Books, 1931.
- Ballantine Books, September 1981.

- 12 July 1931. Every Week Magazine,

- "How They Captured the German Spy, Mme. Maria de Victoria, Told At Last." Every Week Magazine, 12 July 1931.

- 26 July 1931. Every Week Magazine,

- "Secrets of America's Black Chamber." Every Week Magazine, 26 July 1931.

- 10 October 1931. Liberty,

- "Double-Crossing America." Liberty, 10 October 1931.

- 21 November 1931 Saturday Evening Post (article)

- "Cryptograms and Their Solution." Saturday Evening Post, 21 November 1931.

- 19 December 1931. Liberty

- "Are We Giving Away Our State Secrets?" Liberty, 19 December 1931.

- 26 December 1931. Liberty

- "Yardleygrams." Liberty, 26 December 1931.
- This was to be the first of a series of cryptologic puzzles; it is not known how many articles were published.

- 1932, Yardleygrams (book)

- Indianapolis: The Bobbs-Merrill Co., 1932.

- 8 April 1934. Sunday (Washington) Star Magazine,

- "Spies Inside Our Gates." Sunday (Washington) Star Magazine, 8 April 1934.

- 1934, The Red Sun of Nippon (book)

- New York: Longmans, Green and Co., 1934.

- 1934, The Blonde Countess (book)

- New York: Longmans, Green and Co., 1934.

- 1945, Crows Are Black Everywhere (With Carl Grabo.) (book)

- New York: G. P. Putnam's Sons, 1945.

- 1957, The Education of a Poker Player, Including Where and How One Learns to Win (book)

- New York: Simon and Schuster, Inc., 1957.
- New York: Pocket Books, 1961
- New York: Simon and Schuster in a Fireside edition, 1970.
- Oldcastle Books, 1990. ISBN 0-948353-76-7

- 1983, The Chinese Black Chamber: An Adventure in Espionage

- Boston: Houghton Mifflin Company, 1983; xxiv + 225 pp., photographs; clothbound, $13.95.

== Filmography ==
- 1935 Rendezvous (from the book: The Blonde Countess)
- 1935 The Great Impersonation (uncredited screenplay contributor)
