= The American Black Chamber =

- Author: Herbert O. Yardley
- Language: English
- Publisher: The Bobbs-Merrill Company
- Publication date: 1931
- Pages: 375
- OCLC: 5665835
- Dewey Decimal: 940.4/8673
- LC Class: D639.S7 Y3 1931

The American Black Chamber is a 1931 book by Herbert O. Yardley. The book describes the inner workings of the interwar American governmental cryptography organization called the Black Chamber. The cryptography historian David Kahn called the book "the most famous book on cryptology ever published." By describing the inner workings of the organization, the book created large interest and heightened public awareness of the United States's cryptographic abilities. In particular, the Japanese government became aware of the extent of experience that the American government had with cryptography and increased the strength of their own knowledge in cryptography in response. Reviewers suggested the book may have cost the United States significantly in the Pacific War against Japan in World War II.

The book was made into the 1935 film Rendezvous starring William Powell and Rosalind Russell.
