= Clinton Sundberg =

American actor (1903–1987)

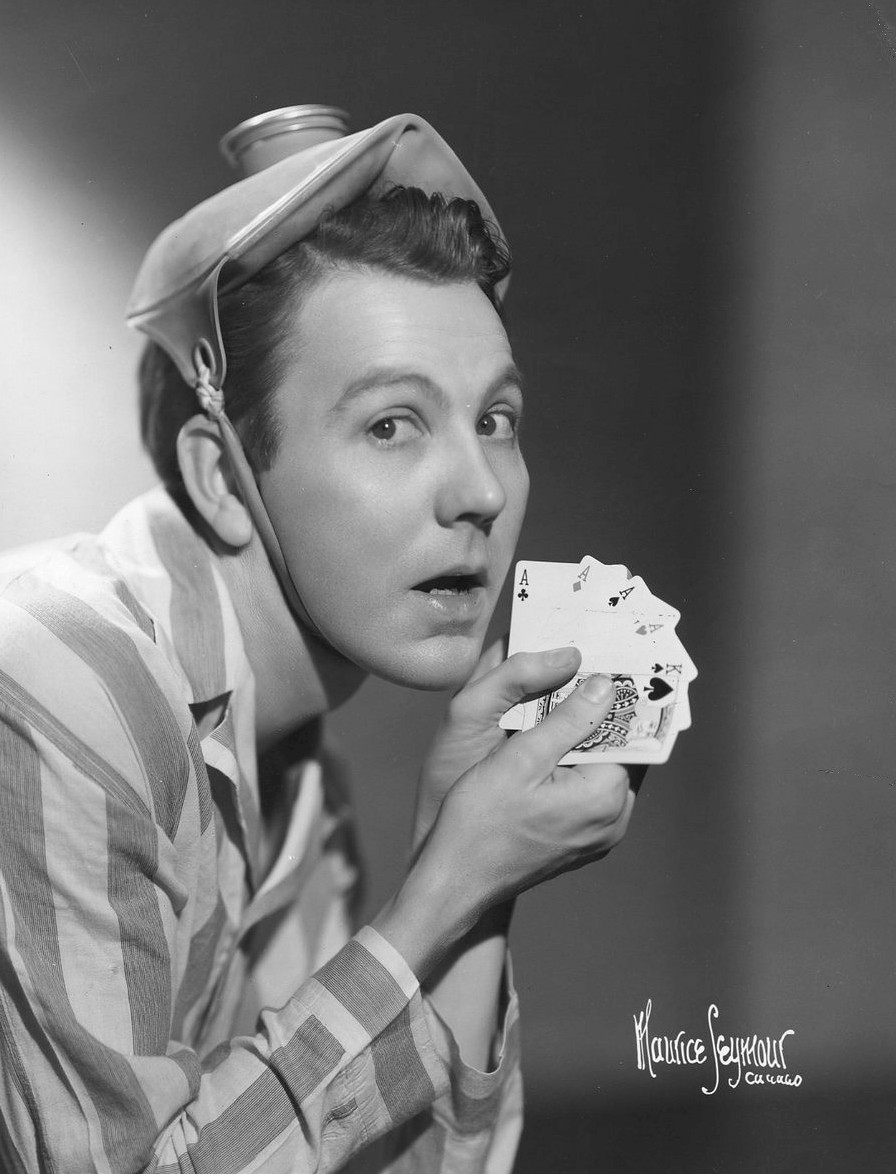
- Sundberg ca. 1930
- Born: Clinton Charles Sundberg; December 7, 1903; Appleton, Minnesota, U.S.
- Died: December 14, 1987 (aged 84); Santa Monica, California, U.S.
- Education: Hamline University
- Occupation: Actor
- Years active: 1934–1987

Clinton Charles Sundberg (December 7, 1903 [some sources say 1906] – December 14, 1987) was an American character actor in film and on stage.

== Early years ==
Sundberg was born in Appleton, Minnesota. He graduated from Hamline University in St. Paul, Minnesota, where he was active in drama, president of his fraternity, and captain of the tennis team.

== Career ==
Sundberg left teaching English literature for acting, appearing in plays in stock theater in New England. He appeared in a number of Broadway plays, debuting in Nine Pine Street (1933). His most notable roles were Mr. Kraler in the original 1957 production of The Diary of Anne Frank and Mortimer Brewster (as a replacement) in the 1944 Arsenic and Old Lace.

He became a contract player at Metro-Goldwyn-Mayer where he appeared in numerous supporting roles in films of the late 1940s and early 1950s. He played Mike, the bartender who listens to Judy Garland's character's troubles in Easter Parade. In the 1949 film In the Good Old Summertime, which also starred Garland and Van Johnson, he played a friendly co-worker and confidant of Johnson's character. In Annie Get Your Gun, he played the hotel owner who hires Annie Oakley to enter the shooting contest against Frank Butler.

Sundberg appeared in "The Englishman," a 1957 episode of Have Gun - Will Travel. In 1962, he played the lead guest-starring role of Luther Boardman, a naive but troublesome newspaper publisher who comes to Laramie, Wyoming in "The Man Behind the News", one of the last episodes of the Western series Lawman. Other TV appearances include two episodes of Perry Mason: "The Case of the Drowsy Mosquito" in 1963 and "The Case of the Scarlet Scandal" in 1966. He also apperared in several TV commercials.

== Partial filmography ==
- Undercurrent (1946) as Mr. Warmsley
- Love Laughs at Andy Hardy (1946) as Haberdashery Clerk
- The Mighty McGurk (1947) as Flexter
- Undercover Maisie (1947) as Guy Canford
- Living in a Big Way (1947) as Everett Hanover Smythe
- The Hucksters (1947) as Michael Michaelson
- Song of the Thin Man (1947) as Mr. Purdy, Hotel Vesta Desk Clerk (uncredited)
- Song of Love (1947) as Dr. Richarz (uncredited)
- Desire Me (1947) as Salesman (scenes deleted)
- Good News (1947) as Prof. Burton Kennyon
- The Bride Goes Wild (1948) as Dentist (uncredited)
- Easter Parade (1948) as Mike the Bartender
- A Date with Judy (1948) as Jameson
- Mr. Peabody and the Mermaid (1948) as Mike Fitzgerald
- Good Sam (1948) as Nelson
- The Kissing Bandit (1948) as Colonel Gomez
- Words and Music (1948) as Shoe Clerk
- Command Decision (1948) as Major Homer V. Prescott
- Big Jack (1949) as C. Petronius Smith
- The Stratton Story (1949) as Man on Radio Baking Pie (voice, uncredited)
- The Barkleys of Broadway (1949) as Bert Felsher
- In the Good Old Summertime (1949) as Rudy Hansen
- Key to the City (1950) as Clerk
- Father Is a Bachelor (1950) as Plato Cassin
- Annie Get Your Gun (1950) as Foster Wilson
- Duchess of Idaho (1950) as Matson
- The Toast of New Orleans (1950) as Oscar
- Two Weeks with Love (1950) as Mr. Finlay
- Mrs. O'Malley and Mr. Malone (1950) as Donald, Steve's Bookie
- On the Riviera (1951) as Antoine
- The Fat Man (1951) as Bill Norton
- As Young as You Feel (1951) as Frank Erickson
- Take Care of My Little Girl (1951) as Fraternity Dance Guest (uncredited)
- The Belle of New York (1952) as Gilford Spivak
- The Girl Next Door (1953) as Samuels the butler
- Sweethearts on Parade (1953) as Dr. Harold Wayne
- The Caddy (1953) as Charles, the Butler
- Main Street to Broadway (1953) as The Father, Mr. Harry Craig
- The Birds and the Bees (1956) as Purser
- Bachelor in Paradise (1961) as Rodney Jones
- The Wonderful World of the Brothers Grimm (1962) as The Prime Minister ('The Dancing Princess') / Hans ('The Singing Bone') (singing voice)
- How the West Was Won (1962) as Hylan Seabury (uncredited)
- Hotel (1967) as Lawrence Morgan
- A Snow White Christmas (1980) as Thinker (voice)
- The Thief and the Cobbler (1993) as Dying Soldier (voice) (final film role)
