= Black Chamber =

American cryptanalytic organization

The Black Chamber, officially the Cable and Telegraph Section and also known as the Cipher Bureau, was the first peacetime cryptanalytic organization in the United States, operating from 1917 to 1929. It was a forerunner of the National Security Agency (NSA).

== History ==
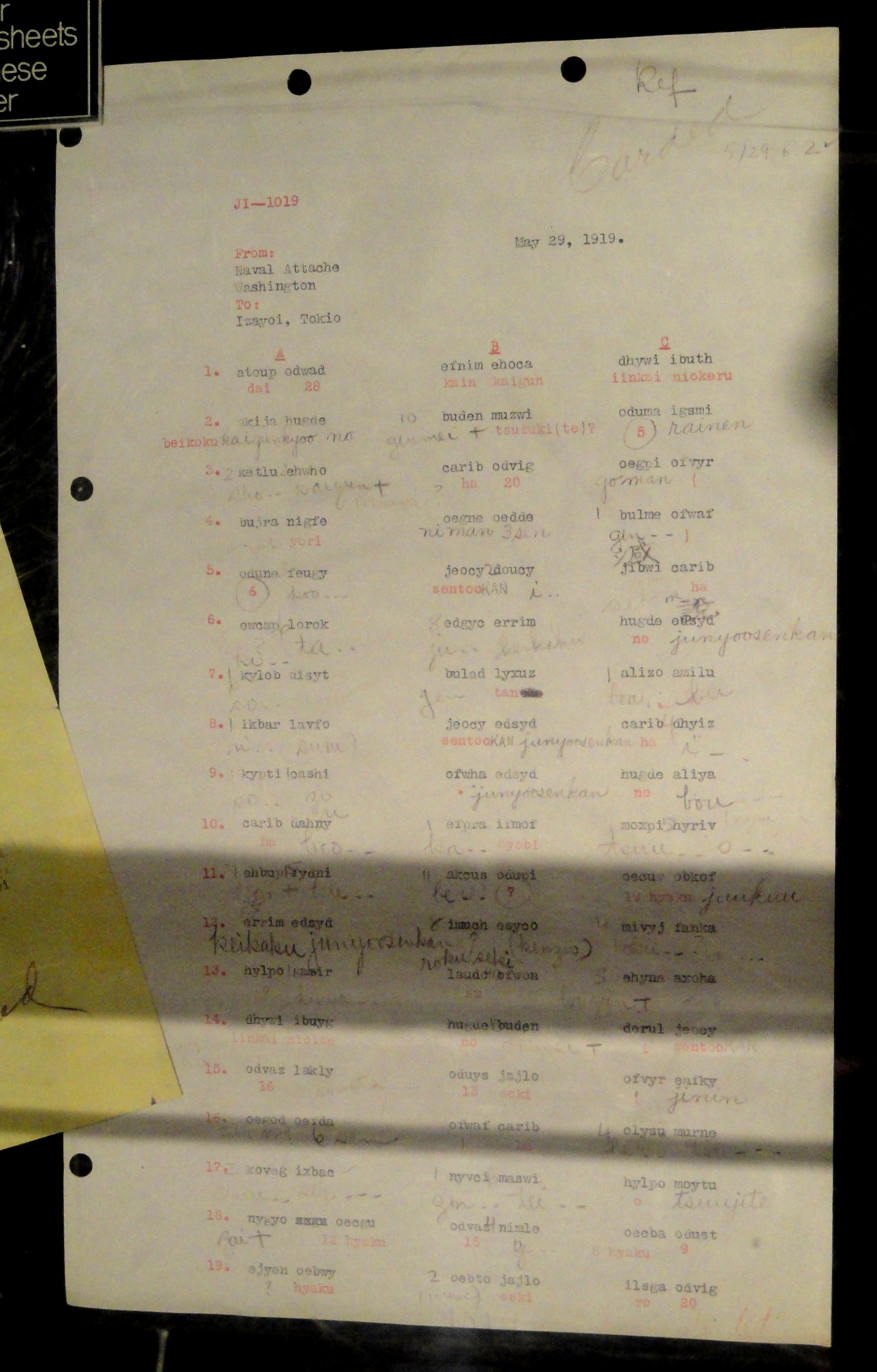
Black Chamber cryptanalytic work sheet for solving a Japanese diplomatic cipher, 1919

Until World War I, the only codes and cypher organizations created by the U.S. government were short-lived agencies of the United States Armed Forces, such as the U.S. Army's Military Intelligence (MI-8).

The Cable and Telegraph Section or Cipher Bureau was established on April 28, 1917, three weeks after the U.S. Congress declared war on the German Empire and began American involvement in World War I. It was headquartered in Washington, D.C., operated under the executive branch without direct Congressional authorization, and was moved in the Army's organizational chart several times. On July 5, 1917, Herbert O. Yardley was assigned to head the Cipher Bureau, which consisted of Yardley and two civilian clerks. It absorbed the Navy's cryptanalysis functions in July 1918.

The Cipher Bureau moved to New York City on May 20, 1919, where it continued intelligence activities as the Code Compilation Company, or the Black Chamber, under Yardley's command. Jointly funded by the Army and the State Department, the Cipher Bureau was tasked with breaking the communications of other nations, primarily diplomatic communications, as occurred during the Washington Naval Conference.

According to intelligence historian James Bamford, the Black Chamber secured the cooperation of American telegraph companies such as Western Union in illegally turning over the cable traffic of foreign embassies and consulates. Eventually, "almost the entire American cable industry" was part of this effort. However, these companies eventually withdrew their support, possibly due to the Radio Act of 1927, which broadened criminal offenses related to breaching the confidentiality of telegraph messages.

In 1929, the State Department withdrew its share of the funding while the Army, undergoing unit reorganizations, transferred the Black Chamber to the Signal Corps, which opted to rebuild the organization for their own purposes and dismissed Yardley and all of his employees. New Secretary of State Henry L. Stimson made this decision, and years later in his memoirs made the oft-quoted comment: "Gentlemen do not read each other's mail." Stimson's ethical reservations about cryptanalysis focused on the targeting of diplomats from the U.S.'s close allies, not on spying in general. Once he became Secretary of War during World War II, he and the entire U.S. command structure relied heavily on decrypted enemy communications.

== Legacy ==
In 1931, Yardley, out of a job and desperate for an income during the Great Depression, wrote a book about the Cipher Bureau, titled The American Black Chamber. The term "Black Chamber" predates Yardley's use of it in the title of his book.

During World War II, the Signal Intelligence Service (SIS) was created to intercept and decipher the communications of the Axis powers. When the war ended, the SIS was reorganized as the Army Security Agency (ASA). On May 20, 1949, all cryptologic activities were centralized under a national organization called the Armed Forces Security Agency (AFSA), a division of the Department of Defense that, after issues relating to poor interagency communication and coordination, was reformed on November 4, 1952 into the National Security Agency (NSA).
