= Jean Rogers =

American actress (1916–1991)

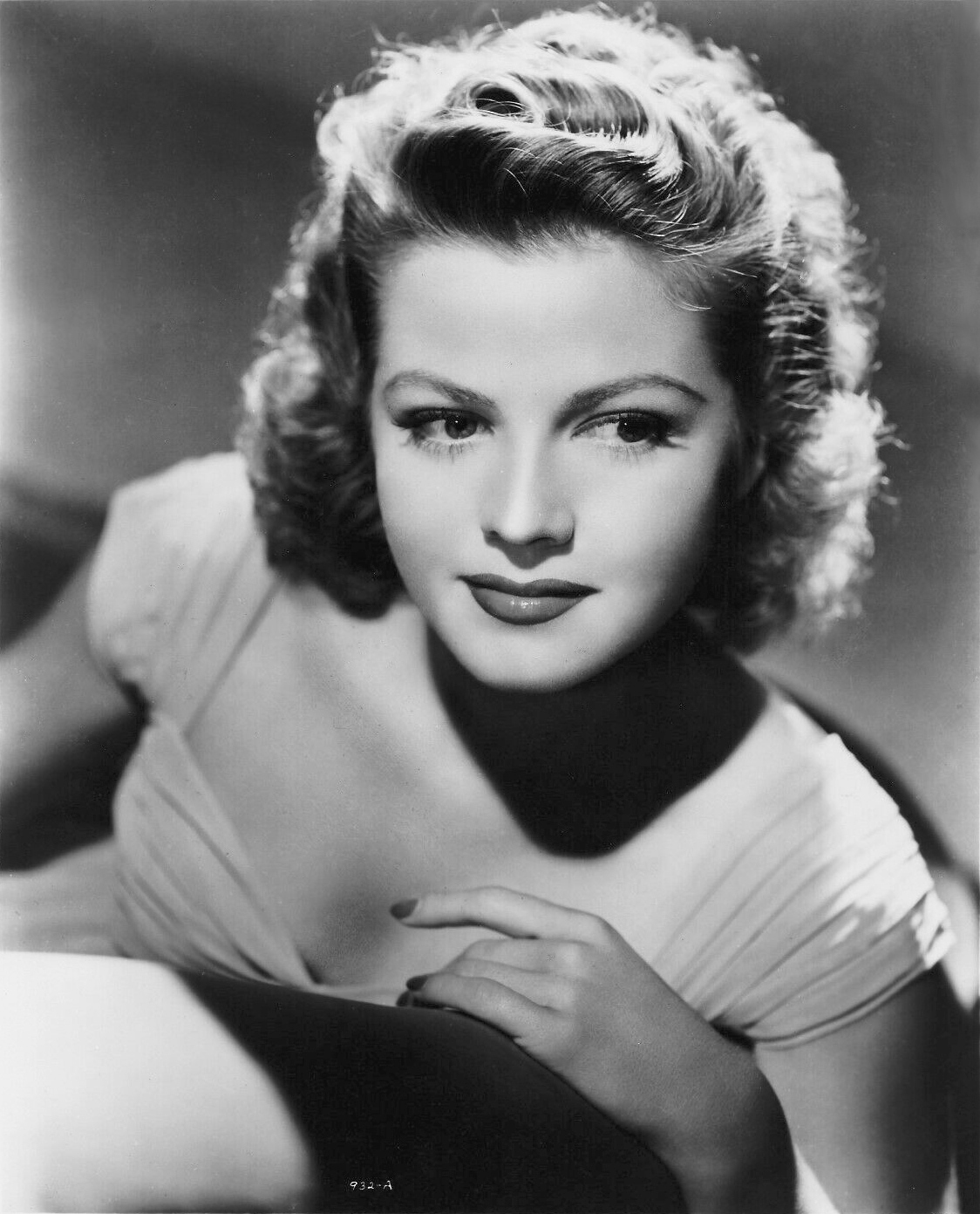
- Jean Rogers in the late 1930s
- Born: Eleanor Dorothy Lovegren; March 25, 1916; Belmont, Massachusetts, U.S.
- Died: February 24, 1991 (aged 74); Sherman Oaks, California, U.S.
- Occupation: Actress
- Years active: 1933–1951
- Notable work: Flash Gordon, Flash Gordon's Trip to Mars
- Spouse: Dan Winkler (m. 1943; died 1970)

Jean Rogers (born Eleanor Dorothy Lovegren; March 25, 1916 – February 24, 1991) was an American actress who starred in serial films in the 1930s and low–budget feature films in the 1940s as a leading lady. She is best remembered for playing Dale Arden in the science-fiction serials Flash Gordon (1936) and Flash Gordon's Trip to Mars (1938).

== Early life ==
Rogers was born Eleanor Dorothy Lovegren in Belmont, Massachusetts. Her father was an immigrant from Malmö, Sweden. She graduated from Belmont High School.

She had hoped to study art, but in 1933 she won a beauty contest sponsored by Paramount Pictures that led to her career in Hollywood. Rogers starred in several serials for Universal between 1935 and 1938, including Ace Drummond and Flash Gordon.

== Early career ==
Rogers was one of seven women chosen out of 2,700 passengers on excursion boats and ferries who were interviewed for roles in the 1934 film Eight Girls in a Boat. The group began work in Hollywood on September 3, 1933. By 1937, Rogers was the only one of the seven featured as an actress.

== Flash Gordon ==
The actress was signed by Universal Pictures in 1935, and started receiving screen credit. She was assigned the ingenue role of Dale Arden in the first two Flash Gordon serials. Buster Crabbe and Rogers were cast as the hero and heroine in the first serial, Flash Gordon. The evil ruler Ming the Merciless (Charles B. Middleton) lusted after her, and Gordon was forced to rescue her from one situation after another. While filming the series in 1937, her costume caught fire and she suffered burns on her hands. Co-star Crabbe smothered the fire by wrapping a blanket on her.

In the first serial, Arden competed with Princess Aura (Priscilla Lawson) for Gordon's attention. Rogers' character was fragile and totally dependent on Gordon for her survival, yet in the first episode, Gordon had to hold onto her parachute for his survival. Lawson's Princess Aura was domineering, independent, voluptuous, conniving, sly, ambitious, and determined to make Gordon her own. In Flash Gordon's Trip to Mars, the second serial, Rogers sported a totally different look. She had dark hair and wore the same modest costume in each episode. Rogers told writer Richard Lamparski that she was not eager to do the second serial and asked her studio to excuse her from the third.

== Feature films ==
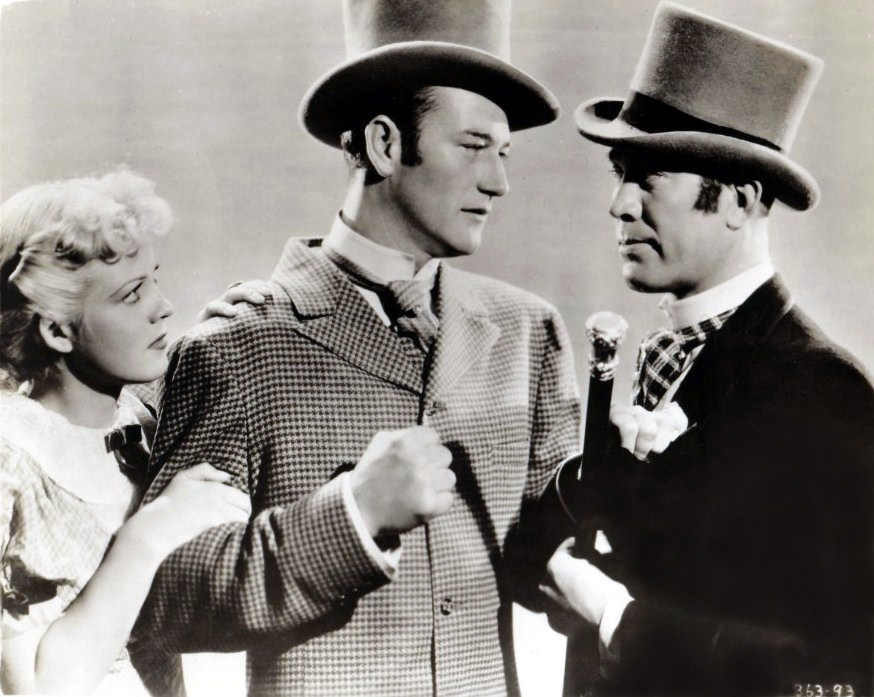
With John Wayne and Ward Bond in Conflict (1936)

Despite starring in serials, Rogers felt she was not going to improve her career unless she could participate in feature films. This ambition was somewhat restricted by studio policy: she was then under contract to Universal, which then specialized in low-budget action and western fare and seldom made big-budget productions. Universal did give her ingenue leads in modest features, including Conflict (1936, as John Wayne's leading lady) and Night Key (1937, with Boris Karloff and Warren Hull). Accustomed to the fast-paced production of serials, Rogers discovered that working in feature films was tedious, with repeated takes of dialogue scenes.

Rogers left Universal for 20th Century-Fox in 1938, where she appeared steadily in the studio's lower-budget product, including its popular series films featuring Michael Shayne (The Man Who Wouldn't Talk, 1940), The Cisco Kid (Viva Cisco Kid, 1940), and Charlie Chan (Charlie Chan in Panama, 1940). The only major motion picture Jean Rogers appeared in at Fox was the Tyrone Power feature Brigham Young; it was a supporting role and she was billed eighth. It didn't lead to further "A-picture" assignments, and Rogers left Fox in 1940.

Her fortunes seemed to improve when she was signed by Metro-Goldwyn-Mayer, the most important studio in the industry, in 1941. After a promising start with Design for Scandal (1941) with Rosalind Russell and Walter Pidgeon, she found herself getting "B" assignments exclusively, like Whistling in Brooklyn (1943) with Red Skelton and A Stranger in Town (1943) with Frank Morgan. She never did appear in another major MGM film, and was dropped by the studio in 1943.

She began freelancing at other studios, and her name still had marquee value for smaller studios like Monogram and Republic. Her last appearance was in a supporting role in the suspense film The Second Woman, released in 1950 by United Artists.

== Later life ==
Rogers married Dan Winkler in 1943 after leaving MGM. They were married until his death in 1970. Because she starred mainly in low-budget films, she was never a major star.

She died in Sherman Oaks in 1991 at the age of 74 following surgery. Her body was cremated and her ashes returned to her family.

== Selected filmography ==
- Footlight Parade (1933) as Chorus Girl (uncredited)
- Eight Girls in a Boat (1934) (with Dorothy Wilson) as School Girl (uncredited)
- Stand Up and Cheer! (1934) as Dancer (uncredited)
- Twenty Million Sweethearts (1934) as Radio Fan (uncredited)
- Dames (1934) as Chorus Girl (uncredited)
- Manhattan Moon (1935) (with ZaSu Pitts) as Joan
- Lady Tubbs (1935) as Debutante (uncredited)
- His Night Out (1935) as Information (uncredited)
- Stormy (1935) as Kerry Dorn
- Tailspin Tommy in the Great Air Mystery (1935, Serial) (with Noah Beery Jr.) as Betty Lou Barnes
- Fighting Youth (1935) as Blonde Student
- The Adventures of Frank Merriwell (1936 serial) (with Donald Briggs) as Elsie Belwood
- Don't Get Personal (1936) as Blondy
- Flash Gordon (1936, Serial) (with Buster Crabbe) as Dale Arden
- Spaceship to the Unknown (1936, edited serial) (with Buster Crabbe) as Dale Arden
- Crash Donovan (1936) as Blonde (uncredited)
- My Man Godfrey (1936) (with William Powell) as Socialite (uncredited)
- Two in a Crowd (1936) as Minor Role (uncredited)
- Ace Drummond (1936 serial) (with Noah Beery Jr.) as Peggy Trainor
- Conflict (1936) (with John Wayne) as Maude Sangster
- Mysterious Crossing (1936) as Yvonne Fontaine
- When Love Is Young (1937) as Irene Henry
- Secret Agent X-9 (1937, Serial) (with Lon Chaney Jr.) as Shara Graustark
- Night Key (1937) (with Boris Karloff) as Joan Mallory
- The Wildcatter (1937) as Helen Conlon
- Reported Missing (1937) as Jean Clayton
- Flash Gordon's Trip to Mars (1938, Serial) (with Buster Crabbe) as Dale Arden
- Deadly Ray from Mars (1938, edited serial) (with Buster Crabbe) as Dale Arden
- Time Out for Murder (1938) as Helen Thomas
- Always in Trouble (1938) (with Jane Withers) as Virginia Darlington
- While New York Sleeps (1938) as Judy King
- Inside Story (1939) as June White
- Hotel for Women (1939) (with Linda Darnell) as Nancy Prescott
- Stop, Look and Love (1939) as Louise Haller
- Heaven with a Barbed Wire Fence (1939) (with Glenn Ford) as Anita Santos
- The Man Who Wouldn't Talk (1940) (with Lloyd Nolan) as Alice Stetson
- Charlie Chan in Panama (1940) (with Sidney Toler) as Kathi Lenesch
- Viva Cisco Kid (1940) (with Cesar Romero) as Joan Allen
- Brigham Young (1940) as Clara Young
- Yesterday's Heroes (1940) as Lee Kellogg
- Let's Make Music (1941) as Abby Adams
- Design for Scandal (1941) (with Rosalind Russell) as Dotty
- Dr. Kildare's Victory (1942) as Annabelle Kirke
- Sunday Punch (1942) as Judy Galestrum
- Pacific Rendezvous (1942) as Elaine Carter
- The War Against Mrs. Hadley (1942) (with Fay Bainter) as Patricia Hadley
- Swing Shift Maisie (1943) (with Ann Sothern)
- A Stranger in Town (1943) (with Frank Morgan) as Lucy Gilbert
- Swing Shift Maisie (1943) as Iris Reed
- Whistling in Brooklyn (1943) (with Red Skelton) as Jean Pringle
- Rough, Tough and Ready (1945) as Jo Matheson
- The Strange Mr. Gregory (1945) as Ellen Randall
- Gay Blades (1946) as Nancy Davis
- Hot Cargo (1946) (with William Gargan) as Jerry Walters
- Backlash (1947; top billing) as Catherine Morland
- Speed to Spare (1948) (with Richard Arlen) as Mary McGee
- Fighting Back (1948) (with Morris Ankrum) as June Sanders
- The Second Woman (1950) (with Robert Young) as Dodo Ferris (final film role)
