= Tweedles (play) =

1921 play by Booth Tarkington and Harry Leon Wilson

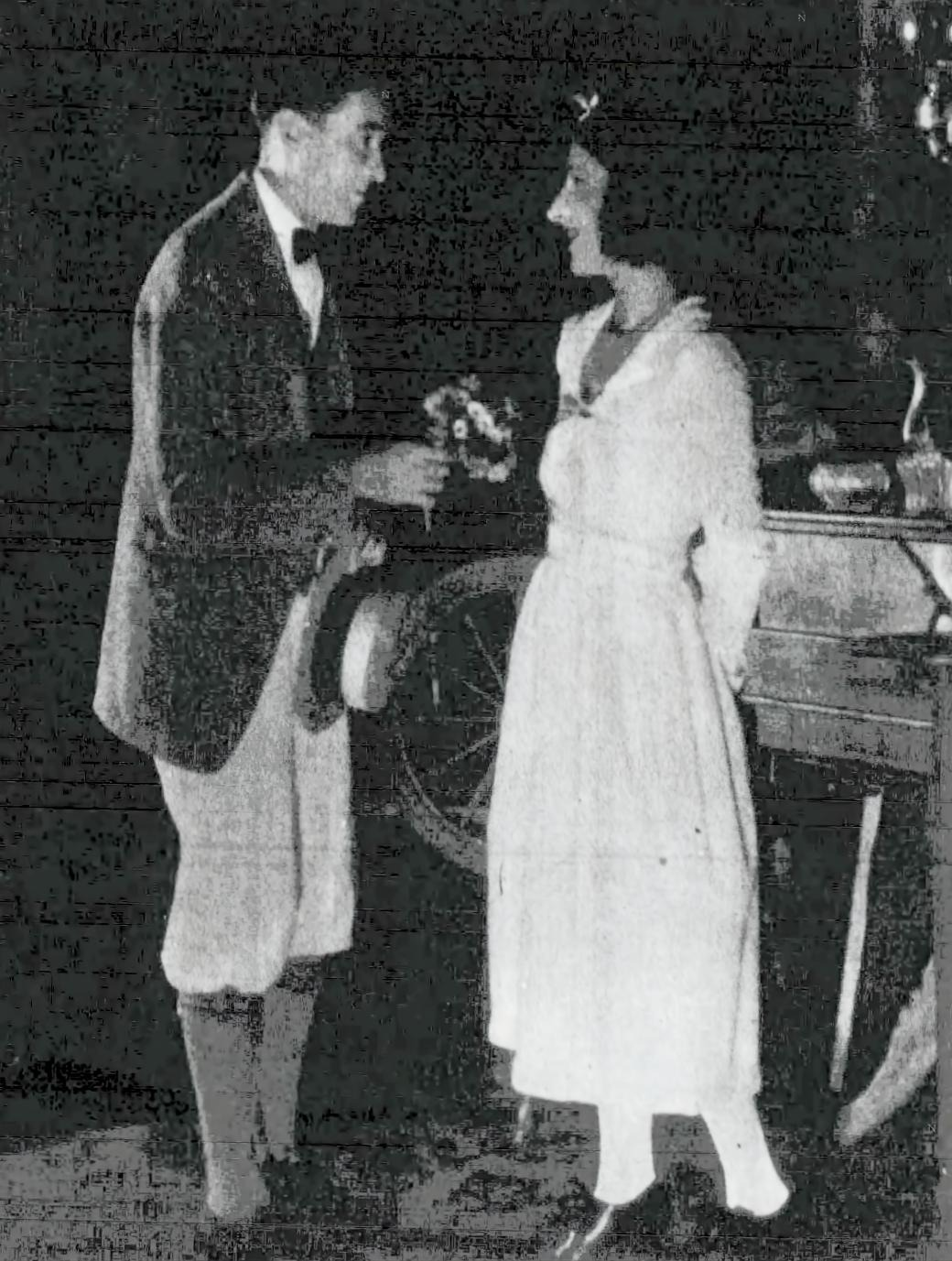
- Gregory Kelly and Ruth Gordon
- Original title: Bristol Glass
- Original language: English
- Written by: Booth Tarkington and Harry Leon Wilson
- First publication: 1924
- Subject: Proud families resist young romance
- Genre: Comedy
- Setting: Antiquity Shop in a seaside Maine village

Premiere
- Date: August 13, 1923
- Place: Frazee Theatre
- Directed by: George Farren
- Original run: 96 performances

Tweedles is a 1921 play by Booth Tarkington and Harry Leon Wilson. It is a comedy in three acts with a single setting, and nine speaking parts. The action of the play takes place over several days at a seaside village in Maine. The story concerns a wealthy young summer visitor who develops an sudden interest in an antique shop's collection of Bristol glass.

The play was produced by Robert H. McLaughlin and staged by George Farren. It starred Gregory Kelly and Ruth Gordon. Due to other contractual obligations for Booth Tarkington and the starring couple, production was delayed for two years, during which the title changed from Bristol Glass to Tweedles. It premiered on Broadway during August 1923 and ran until early November, for 96 performances.

== Characters ==
Characters are listed in order of appearance within their scope.

Lead

- Winsora Tweedle is 20, a waitress at her aunt's antique store, which also serves tea. (Note: The store and its Tea Terrace balcony are part of the Tweedle family residence.)
- Julian Castlebury is 21, the scion of a visiting Philadelphia family, independently wealthy of his parents.

Supporting

- Mrs. Albergone called Euphy, is Adam's shopkeeper sister, twice-widowed, who helped raise Winsora.
- Mr. Castlebury called Lambert, is the wealthy middle-aged father of Julian.
- Adam Tweedle is 60, Winsora's widower father, a handyman and a church elder.
- Philemon Tweedle is a bibulous constable, cousin to Adam, a diligent enforcer of Prohibition.

Featured

- Mrs. Ricketts is an assertive and conniving young widow from Philadelphia, with designs on Julian.
- Mrs. Castlebury is the middle-aged mother of Julian, protective of her son's social position.
- Ambrose Tweedle is 17, Adam's son and Winsora's younger brother, who despises "dogfish" (summer visitors).

== Synopsis ==
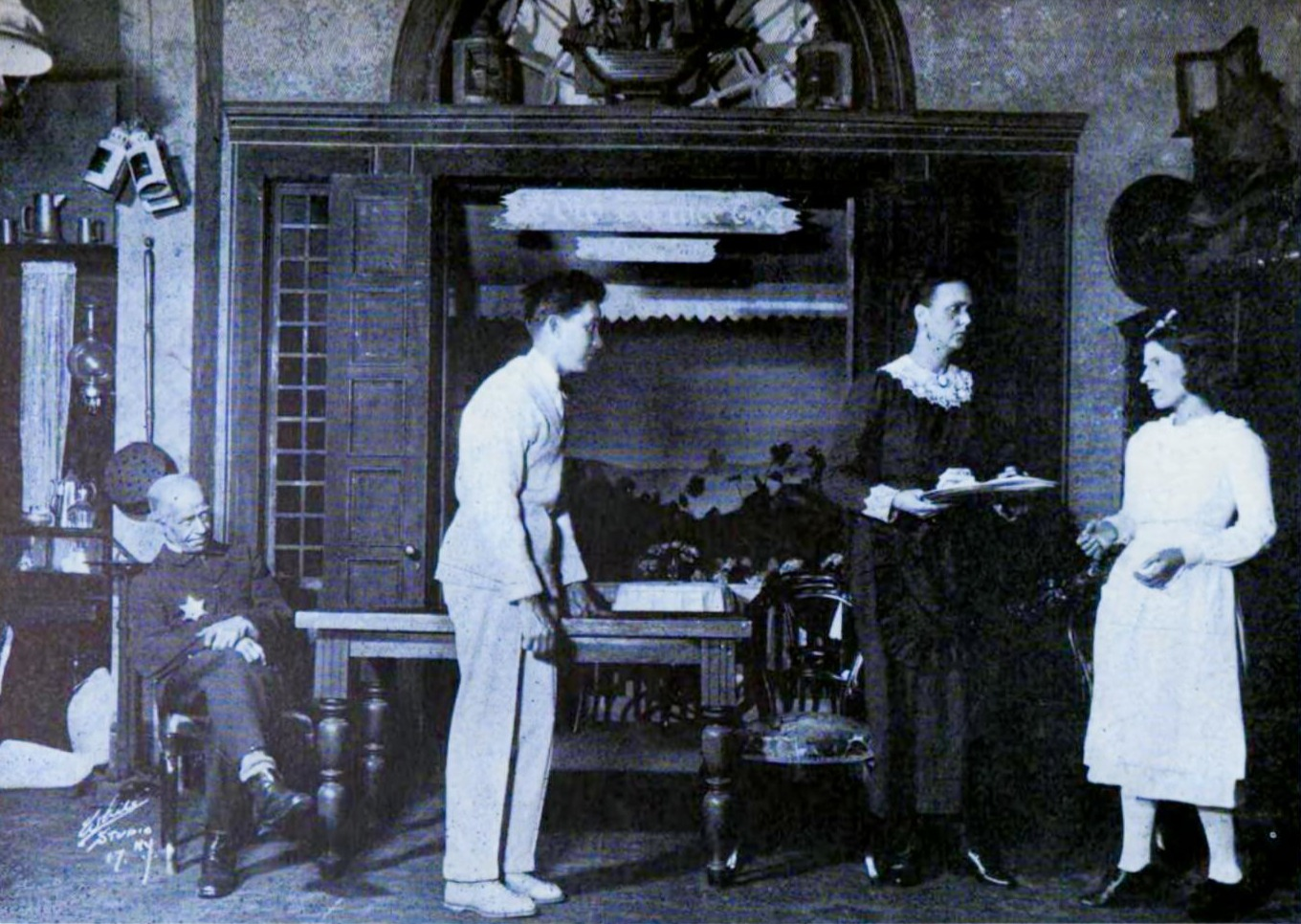

Act I (Mrs. Albergone's Antiquity Shop. A Saturday summer afternoon.) Mrs. Ricketts tries to pump Mrs. Albergone about Julian Castlebury's purchase of Bristol glass three weeks ago. Why did he leave his purchase there instead of taking it home? The stoic shopkeeper is not obliging but does admit to having a waitress for the Tea Terrace, her niece Winsora. From her, Mrs. Ricketts learns Julian visits his glass collection daily. When Julian enters the shop, he smiles at Winsora but abruptly tries to leave when Mrs. Ricketts hails him. He has turned down her invitation to go motoring, and doggedly declines to explain his sudden interest in collectible glass. Julian departs; his parents now enter the shop. Mrs. Ricketts draws their attention to the glass collection that Julian purchased. She tricks Winsora into leaving to look up a price. Alone with the Castleburys, Mrs. Ricketts suggests Julian should go motoring rather than hang around a tea room waitress. Mr. Castlebury is concerned, but Mrs. Castlebury recognizes the widow as the greater danger to her son. Later, Julian returns to pester Winsora, speaking aimlessly about the glass, while Winsora expects him to broach another subject. Mrs. Albergone tells Julian to take his glass away, but he cannot until Monday. Constable Philemon Tweedle, who calls the shop's antiques "queeriosities", cautions Julian to stay away from Winsora, his deterrence lessened by a bonhomie fueled by confiscated liquor. Adam Tweedle also warns Julian to stay away; the young man puzzles and alarms Adam by his indifference to local public opinion. (Curtain)

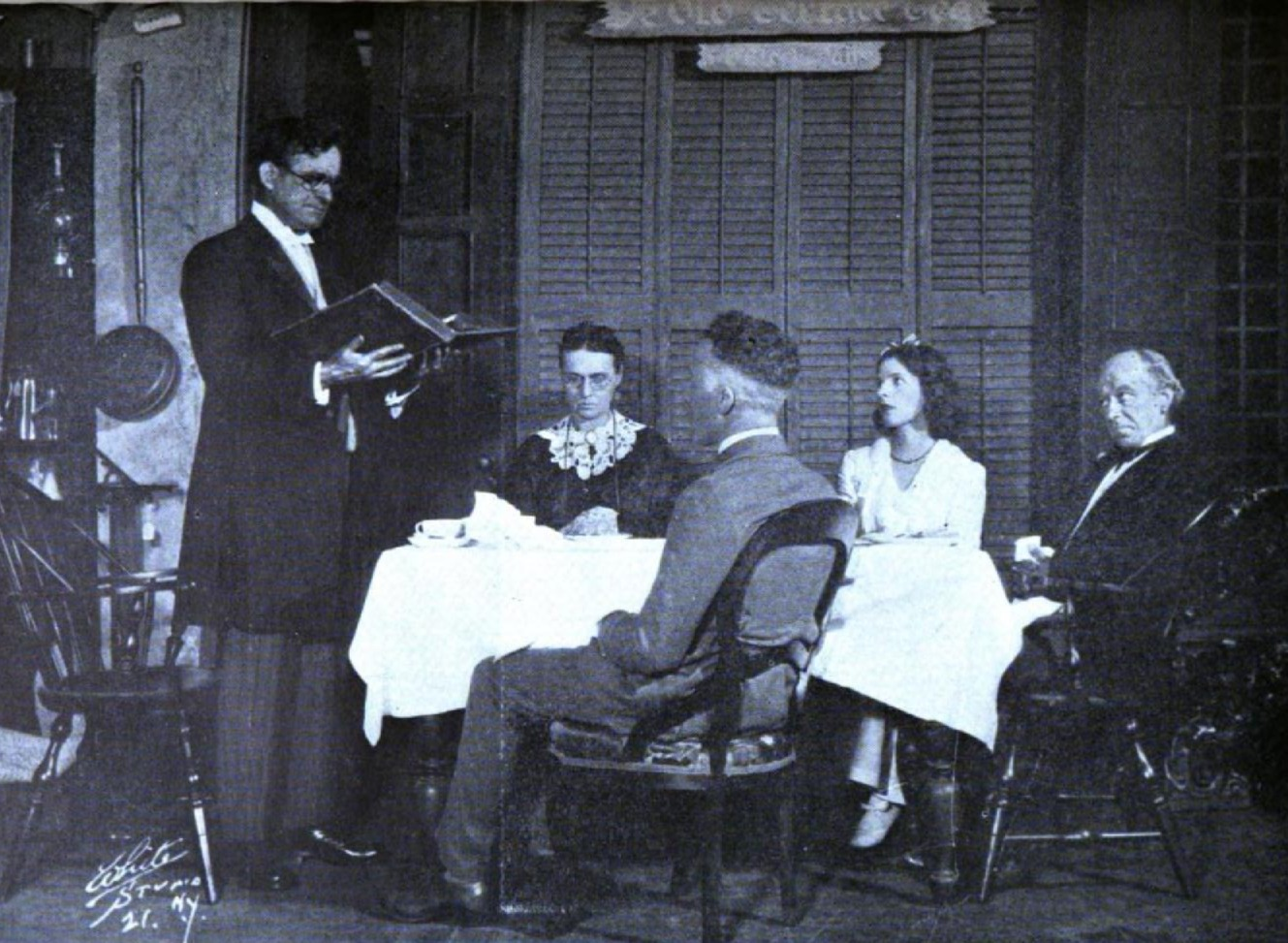

Act II (Same as Act I. Sunday, dinner time.) The Tweedles and Mrs. Albergone have just finished dinner. Adam reads a bible passage, aimed at Winsora, about preserving the family name. They are astonished when Julian comes knocking at the closed shop door. He seems impervious to increasingly hostile suggestions to leave, his one and only concern to see Winsora. Challenged to be fair, Adam agrees to let Winsora talk to Julian alone in the shop. Julian is unable to vocalize his feelings, so their conversation goes in circles, both sensing the other's affection. Julian's circumlocution continues when Adam returns, but he finally confesses his intentions. Adam is angry, but he is not prone to physical violence. When Julian's parents arrive, Adam invites them to confer with Julian, his sister and Winsora. Adam misunderstands Mr. Castlebury's talk of family position and social prominence; he assumes the summer visitors are admitting their son is not worthy of an alliance with the exalted Tweedle family. Worse, Mr. Castlebury reveals Julian's struggle at prep school and withdrawal from college after freshman year. Adam is delighted to inform them of Winsora's graduating high school with honors and completing a year at college. Though Adam and the Castleburys hold the same views on the young couple, the latter are too mortified to speak at his assumption of social superiority. They exit, leaving Julian struggling to get Winsora to understand him. When she suggests he cares only for the Bristol glass and not her, he lifts the chest containing it and smashes it on the floor. "It is you I care about" he tells her. (Curtain)

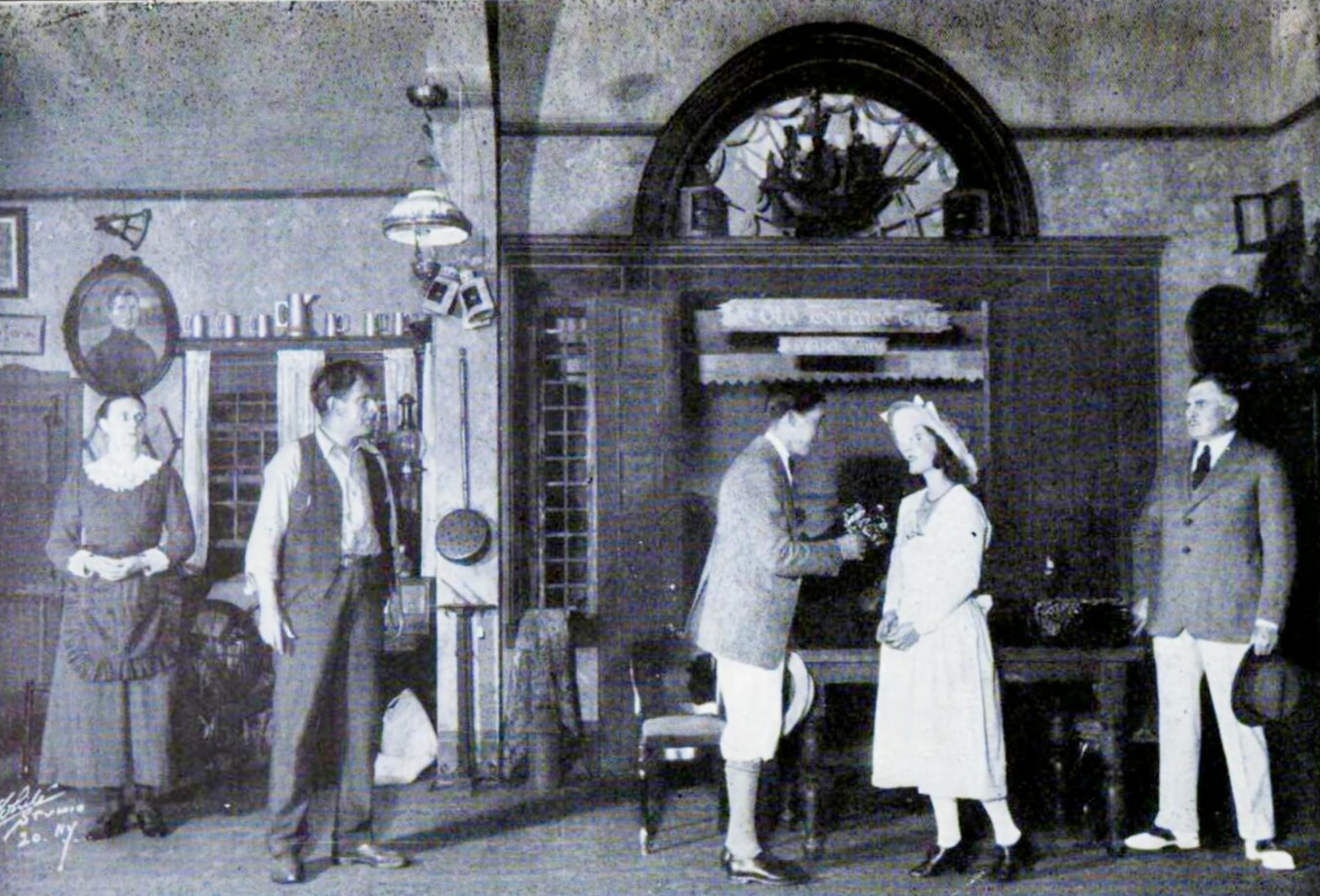

Act III (Same as Act I. Monday morning.) The industrious Mrs. Albergone is delighted at the arrival of Monday morning after an enforced Sunday idleness. Winsora's mood is less clear; pensive and winsome, certainly, but her aunt wonders will she break into joyful laughter as she did last night? Constable Philemon has confiscated a small picnic basket from Mrs. Ricketts, which clinks when moved. His efforts to "destroy" this contraband render him benign and loquacious towards Julian. He reveals the sharp practitioners and blackguards of Tweedle family history, including a Revolutionary War traitor. Philemon mentions how Mrs. Albergone, after enduring a loveless first marriage, adored her second husband, Capt. Albergone, whose portrait hangs in the shop. Julian uses this information to put Adam on the defensive, and recites a litany of errant Castlebury ancestors to further show how foolish family pride can be. Julian now asks permission to take Winsora for a walk, but she speaks up for herself: "You're asking the wrong person, ask me" she tells Julian. Mr. Castlebury and Adam, now reconciled to the inevitable, confer as the young couple stroll out together. (Curtain)

== Original production ==
=== Background ===
Booth Tarkington and Harry Leon Wilson completed writing Bristol Glass by September 1921, when producer George C. Tyler announced it for later that season. It would have husband and wife actors Gregory Kelly and Ruth Gordon as the leads. The couple had married while starring in Tarkington's Seventeen, and this new comedy had been written with them in mind. However, another Tarkington comedy produced by Tyler, also set in Maine, called The Wren failed after a few weeks in October 1921, despite starring Helen Hayes and Leslie Howard. By April 1922, Tyler had decided Bristol Glass was "not rugged enough for production this season".

=== Early tryouts ===
After a summer visit to Booth Tarkington in Kennebunkport, Maine, Gregory Kelly and Ruth Gordon led a tryout for Bristol Glass. Produced by Robert H. McLaughlin, and staged by George Farren, who also played Adam Tweedle, it had its first performance on August 7, 1922 at Cleveland's Ohio Theatre. The local reviewer praised the acting and the play, but said it was too long.

Producer Robert McLaughlin began recasting Bristol Glass in March 1923, prior to another tryout. Frank McGlynn now took the role of Adam Tweedle for the second tryout of Bristol Glass, again given at the Ohio Theatre in Cleveland, on April 2, 1923. The production then went to the Blackstone Theatre in Chicago, starting April 7, 1923. Sheppard Butler of the Chicago Tribune called the play "thin", and speculated that it was largely Tarkington's work with little by his co-author. Frank McGlynn, having starred in Abraham Lincoln for years, reportedly carried an air of tragic gloom into the role of Adam Tweedle, so that someone said he "played the whole second act as if he knew Booth were going to kill him in the third".

=== Cast ===
Cast for the Broadway run.
Role	Actor	Dates	Notes and sources
Winsora Tweedle	Ruth Gordon	Aug 13, 1923 - Nov 03, 1923	
Julian Castlebury	Gregory Kelly	Aug 13, 1923 - Nov 03, 1923	
Mrs. Abergone	Patti Cortez	Aug 13, 1923 - Nov 03, 1923	
Mr. Castlebury	Wallis Clark	Aug 13, 1923 - Nov 03, 1923	
Adam Tweedle	George Farren	Aug 13, 1923 - Nov 03, 1923	Farren also staged the play, though a reviewer said there was no director's credit in Broadway programs.
Philemon Tweedle	Donald Meek	Aug 13, 1923 - Nov 03, 1923	
Mrs. Rickets	Cornelia Otis Skinner	Aug 13, 1923 - Nov 03, 1923	
Mrs. Castlebury	Florence Pendleton	Aug 13, 1923 - Nov 03, 1923	
Ambrose Tweedle	Irving Mitchell	Aug 13, 1923 - Nov 03, 1923	

=== Broadway premiere and reception ===
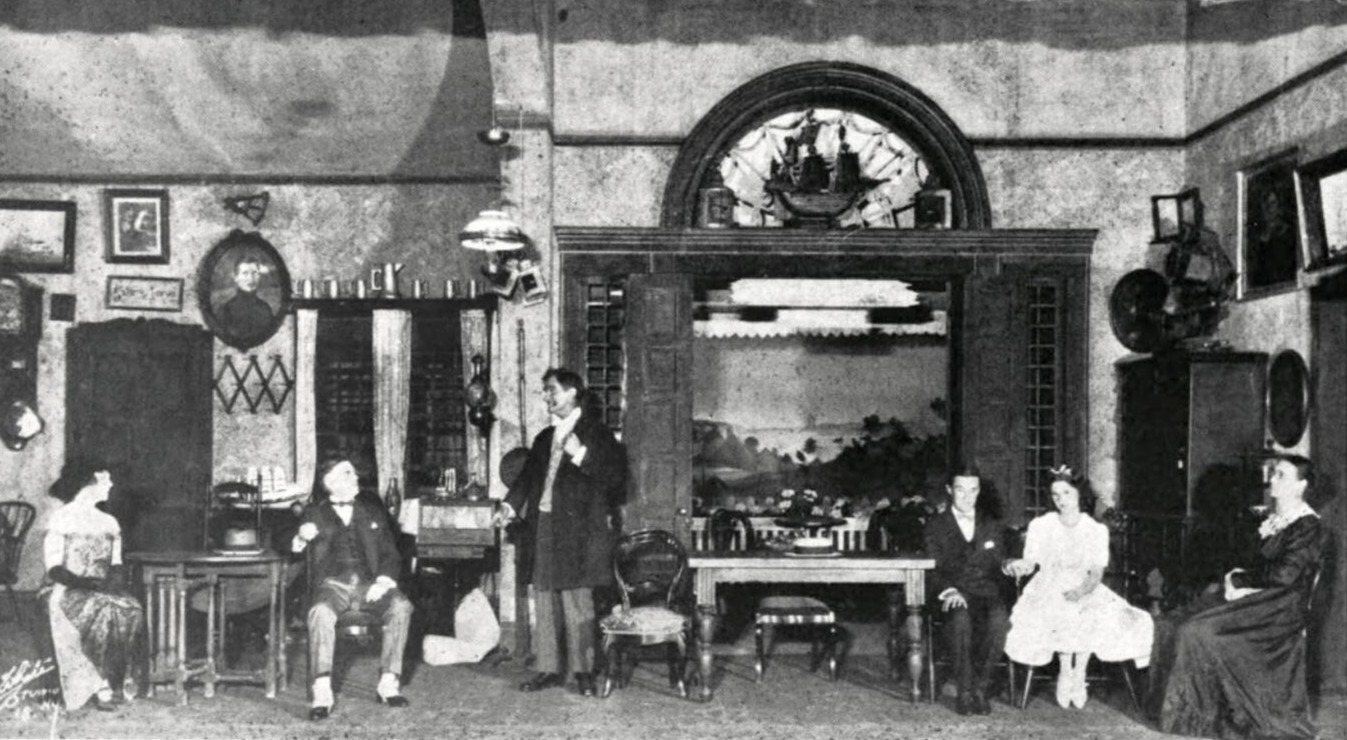

The Kellys were again summer visitors to Booth Tarkington's home in Maine during July 1923. When they returned to New York City, the play, now renamed Tweedles, went into rehearsal, with George Farren returning as Adam Tweedle. Cornelia Otis Skinner and Patti Cortez continued playing their parts from the Chicago tryout, but the other minor roles were recast.

Tweedles had its Broadway premiere at the Frazee Theatre on Tuesday, August 13, 1923. Burns Mantle called it "a pleasant but thin little character comedy". Arthur Pollock in The Brooklyn Daily Eagle said Tweedles was "a sedentary play" without a plot, but Gregory Kelly and Ruth Gordon were deserving of success and made it delightful, while Donald Meek gave "a fine, merry performance". John Corbin thought Booth Tarkington did his best playwriting when paired with Harry Leon Wilson. He was the only critic to refer to the comedy as a satire, his reasoning being the play's send-up of family ancestral pride.

Alexander Woollcott said Tweedles was "a delightful and unsuccessful comedy" in a later essay, in which he praised Gordon and Kelly as "both charming and capable". Tweedles was the last play in which Kelly and Gordon performed together. Thanks to Kelly's tutelage, Gordon was now able to pursue a career independent of his. As their performing work went in different directions, so too did their personal life.

=== Broadway closing ===
Tweedles closed at the Frazee Theatre on Saturday, November 3, 1923, after 96 performances.

== Bibliography ==
- Burns Mantle (ed). The Best Plays of 1923-24 And The Year Book Of The Drama In America. Dodd, Mead and Company, 1960 (1924).
- Booth Tarkington and Harry Leon Wilson. Tweedles: A Comedy. Samuel French, 1924.
- Alexander Woollcott. Enchanted Aisles. G. P. Putnam's Sons, The Knickerbocker Press, 1924.
- Ruth Gorden. My Side: The Autobiography of Ruth Gordon. Harper & Row, 1976. ISBN 0-06-011618-8.
