= Robert McLaughlin =

Robert McLaughlin may refer to:

- Bobby McLaughlin (1925–2003), Northern Irish footballer who played for Wrexham, Cardiff City and Southampton,
- Robert McLaughlin (industrialist) (1836–1921), Canadian industrialist and businessman
- Robert McLaughlin (RAF officer) (1896–?), British World War I flying ace
- Robert E. McLaughlin (1908–1973), American journalist and author
- Robert Enoch McLaughlin (1907–1978), Washington, DC politician
- Robert H. McLaughlin (1877–1939), American novelist, playwright and theater manager
- Rob McLaughlin, Canadian journalist and digital media producer
