= Gregory Kelly (actor) =

American stage actor, 1892–1927

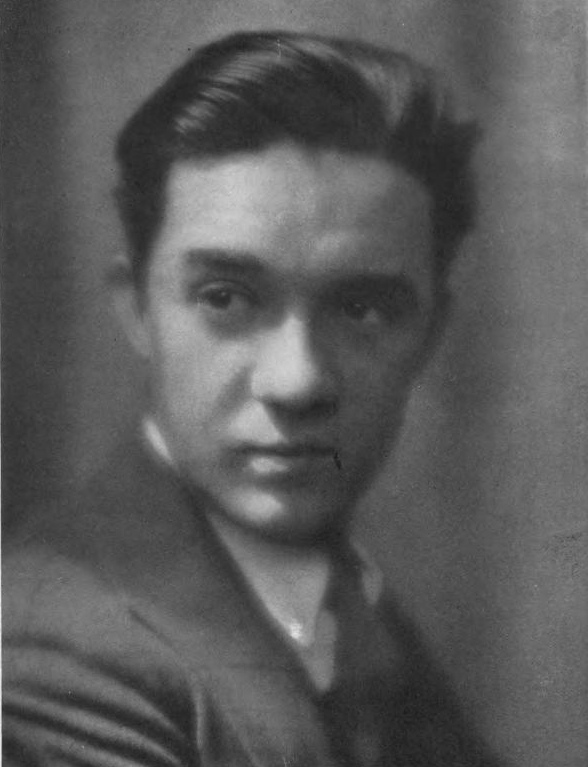
- Gregory Kelly 1919
- Born: Gregory F. Kelly; March 16, 1892; New York City, New York, U.S.
- Died: July 9, 1927 (aged 35); Manhattan, New York, U.S.
- Occupation: Actor
- Years active: 1904–1927
- Known for: Seventeen, The Butter and Egg Man
- Spouse: Ruth Gordon Jones (m. 1918–1927)

Gregory Kelly (March 16, 1892 – July 9, 1927) was an American stage actor, who began performing as a child. He was a Broadway attraction, starring in such long-running productions as Seventeen and The Butter and Egg Man. His early death precluded him from appearing in more than two films. He is remembered today as the first husband of Ruth Gordon, who credited him with teaching her acting.

== Early years ==
Gregory Kelly was born on March 16, 1892, in New York City, to Thomas J. Kelly, a letter carrier, and his wife Agnes J. Kelly. His grandparents on both sides were immigrants to New York from Ireland. He was the youngest of three sons; his older brother Thomas J. Kelly Jr. would also become an actor. When he was two, he had rheumatic fever, which Ruth Gordon later speculated may have damaged his heart.

== Career ==
=== Early stage work ===
Actress Grace Menken recalled that as a child Gregory Kelly went through Anna Taliaferro's theatrical agency with her and her sister Helen Menken. Kelly's first verifiable stage credit (Note: Many later anecdotes recount how Kelly started acting at age four with Joe Jefferson in a revival of Rip Van Winkle, but contemporaneous sources for this have not yet been found.) came in January 1904 with a production of The Light That Lies in Woman's Eyes. He and his older brother Tommy were jointly billed as "Two Boys, sons of Red Head". The play starred Virginia Harned, whose then husband E. H. Sothern had written it for her. When the production went on tour in February, the Kelly brothers went with it.

Kelly next appeared in a touring production of After Midnight, starting in September 1904, in which he received his first critical notice: "Master Gregory Kelly... also comes in for a large share of the applause". This tour lasted through the end of February 1905, resumed in September 1905 with new producers and a new leading man, and finished up in February 1906.

During 1908 Kelly joined a touring vaudeville musical called School Days by Gus Edwards, who also produced. It played Broadway for a month starting in September 1908, resuming touring in late October. He stayed with this tour through April 1909.

=== Mrs. Fiske ===
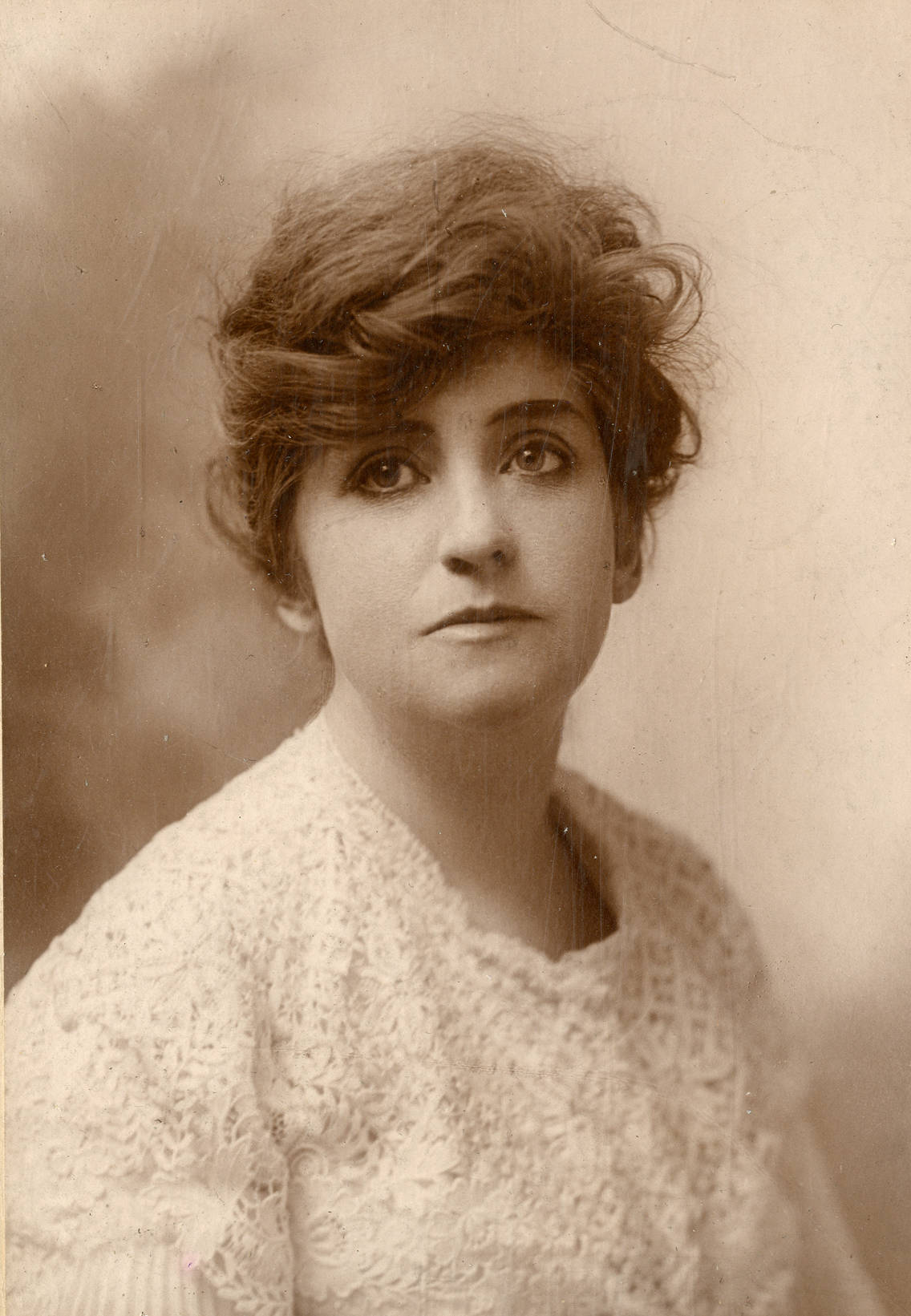
Mrs. Fiske 1910

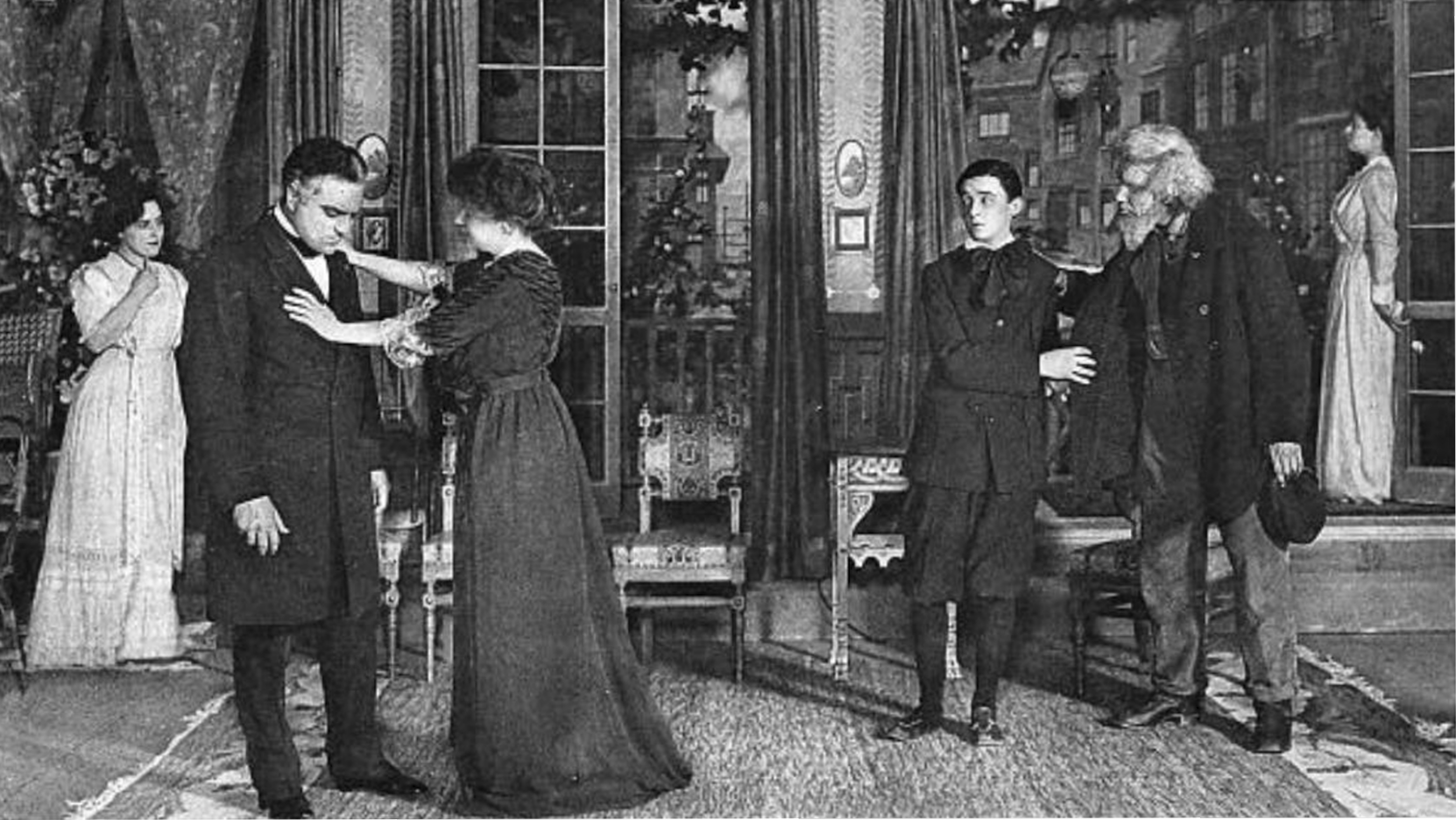
The Pillars of Society

The quality of plays he appeared in, and Kelly's professional skills, improved after he joined "The Manhattan Company" of Mrs. Fiske in 1910. He later attributed to her tutoring his success in stage acting, particularly in timing dialogue pause and response. Harrison Grey Fiske first cast Kelly as a thirteen-year-old boy in a revival of Ibsen's The Pillars of Society. The production would have a three-day tryout in Rochester, New York, followed by a two-week engagement on Broadway. The play was accorded only mild interest by the New-York Tribune reviewer, but they commended the acting of the entire company. Kelly "...spoke with understanding and carried himself modestly, disdaining the 'smartness' which is the usual fault of stage boys." Following Pillars, Kelly then spent two weeks in a more adult role for a one-act curtain-raiser to Mrs. Fiske's main feature, Hannele.

The Fiskes took their production of Pillars on tour across the country, Kelly accompanying. While on the road, the Fiskes tried out a revival of Langdon Mitchell's Becky Sharp, a dramatization of Vanity Fair. Mrs. Fiske had been the original producer and director of this 1899 work. Kelly played a minor role in Becky Sharp, so the Fiskes made him assistant stage manager. Kelly was still with the Fiskes when Becky Sharp finished a two-week engagement on Broadway in early April 1911.

=== Kismet ===
By late November 1911, Kelly was reported to have joined the cast of Klaw and Erlanger's Kismet, to be directed by Harrison Grey Fiske. This spectacular production (Note: It was a year for spectacles on Broadway, with Liebler & Company's The Garden of Allah having opened two months earlier.) had its US premiere at the Knickerbocker Theatre on December 25, 1911. The cast was so large that it was divided into three sections in newspapers for just the principals.

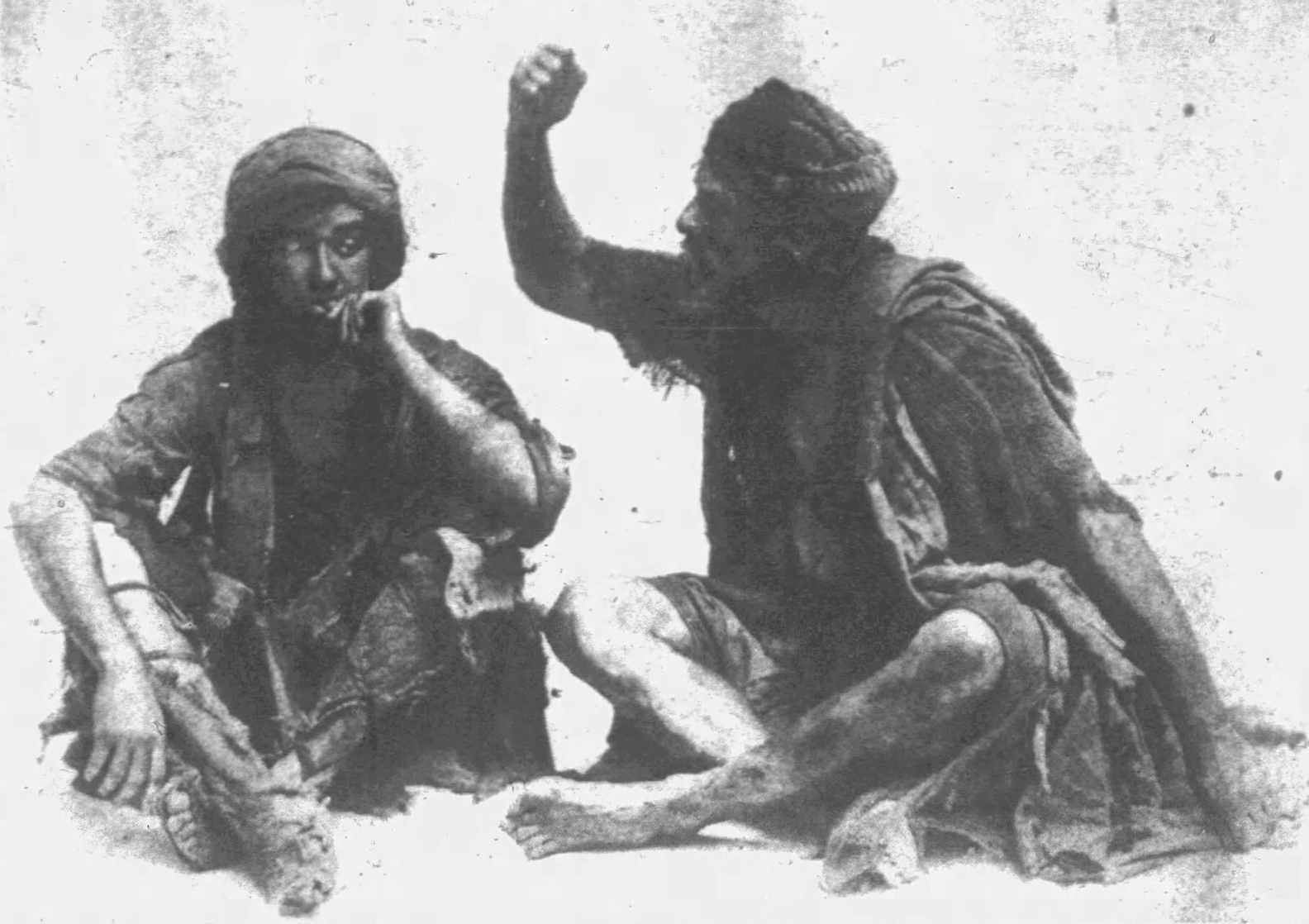
Gregory Kelly and Charles Dalton

After its New York run ended in May 1912, the original production company went on tour, Kelly with them. Lost among the crowd of featured players, there was little about Kelly's performance to stick in reviewer's minds. As one critic said of the actors, "it was not at all easy to sort them out", being in fantastic garb and affecting a "Baghdad accent". Additional to his acting, Kelly was again an assistant, along with T. Tamamoto, (Note: The Japan-born actor was the only Asian on the legitimate stage (as opposed to vaudeville) in America at this time. He first performed on Broadway in a 1904 melodrama, The Heir to the Hoorah, during which he used jiu jitsu.) to stage manager Henry B. Stillmann. Besides managing regular matinee and evening performances for the public, the trio conducted full rehearsals using just the Kismet understudies, to keep them sharp. By September 1914, while touring Canada, Kelly had been promoted to the supporting role of the Beggar Kasim, and his brother Thomas had joined the cast as Caliph Abdaliah.

Kelly's involvement with 'Kismet' finally came to an end in October 1914, when he was included in an announced cast for The Young Idea. This was a vehicle for Lydia Lopokova, to be produced by Harrison Grey Fiske. It had been renamed Just Herself by the time it premiered on Broadway on December 23, 1914. Unfortunately, the play was shut down just six days later when producer Fiske entered voluntary bankruptcy.

=== Stuart Walker ===
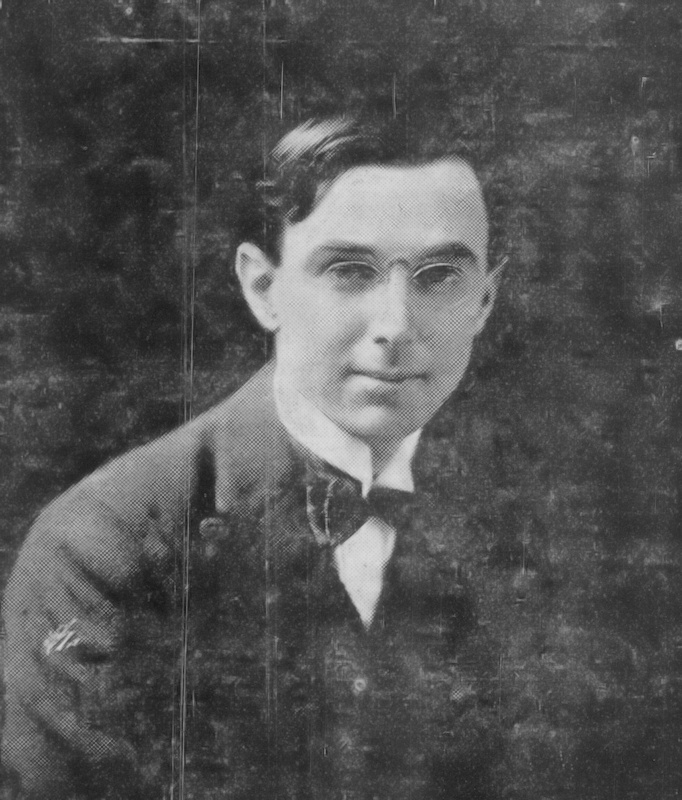
Stuart Walker

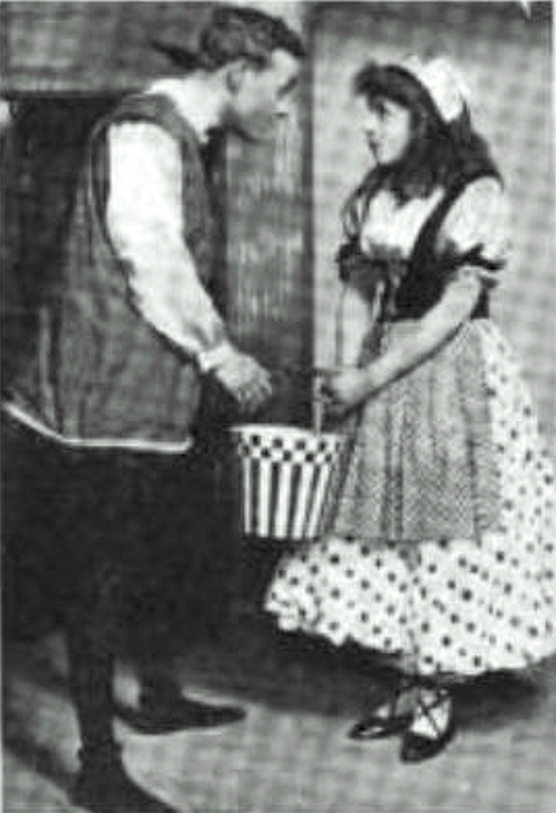
Six Who Pass

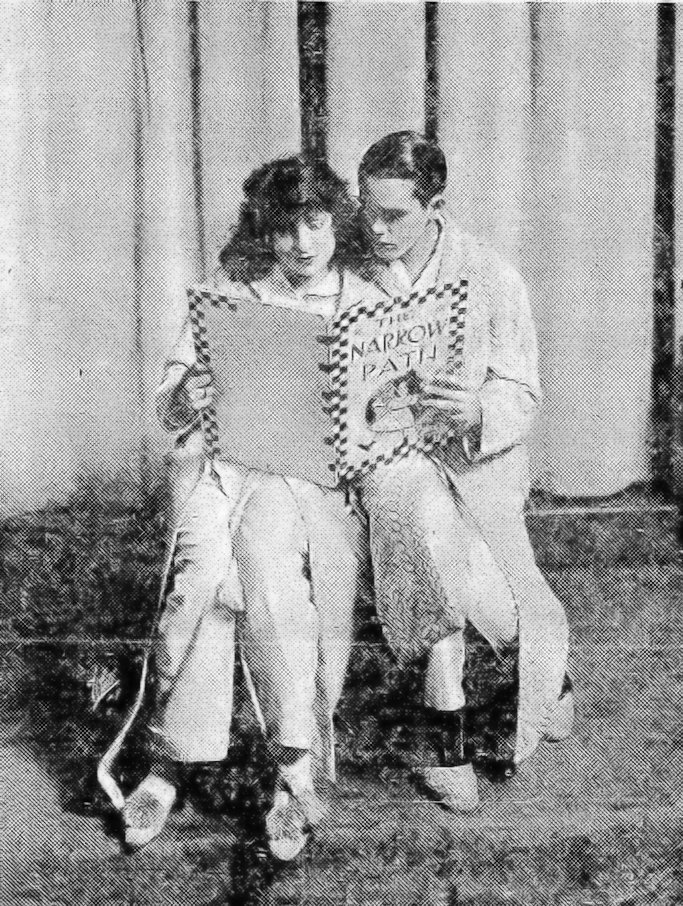
Nevertheless

Gregory Kelly had been with the Fiskes since 1910, but the bankruptcy ended this association. By April 1915, he was listed among the company of the Ben Greet Woodland Players, of which his brother Thomas was also a member. The Woodland Players' repertoire included several Shakespeare comedies. Though they used costumes, Ben Greet (Note: Greet himself did not perform with the troupe nor accompany it, leaving it to a hired manager.) eschewed scenery and props for his Woodland Players, preferring to perform outside on grass where possible. He also favored "complete text" performances, forgoing any cuts to the plays.

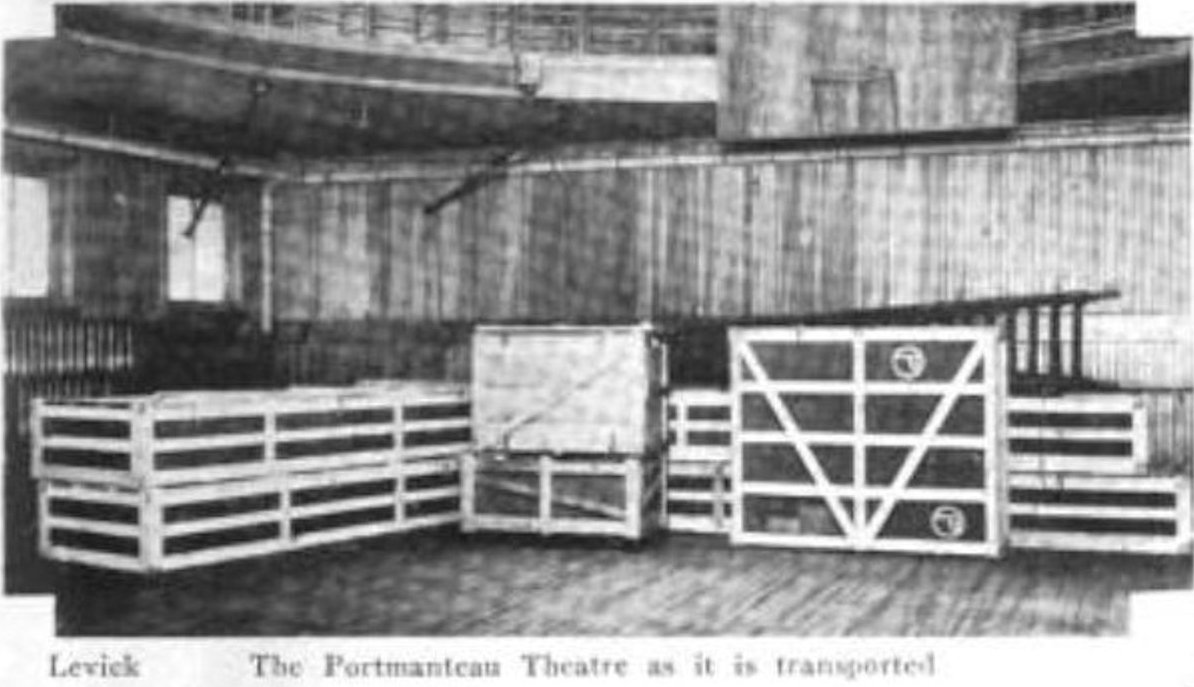

Kelly had joined Stuart Walker's Portmanteau Theatre company by February 1916, when he took part in benefit performances for Friendship House in Washington, D. C., attended by first lady Edith Wilson. Walker directed the Portmanteau Theatre, working with producers Russell Janney and Maximillian Elser Jr. The repertoire consisted of Walker's own one-act plays, and the 16th Century anonymous Gammer Gurton's Needle. (Note: The name of the company came from its own small portable theater, with stage, proscenium, lighting, and curtain, which could be set up in two hours time, enabling the troupe to play anywhere. Even when the troupe played in a regular theater, they still mounted the Portmanteau Theatre on its stage, because of the unique lighting system Walker had devised.)

Besides performing, Kelly acted as stage manager for the troupe. Walker, who occasionally did small roles, got along well with Kelly, despite disparite backgrounds. Walker was a "well bred Kentuckian", and a bit prim, while Kelly was not. Walker acquired American rights to perform three plays by Lord Dunsany in August 1916. These plays were performed on Broadway during November and December 1916, along with nine other works from the Portmanteau Theater repertoire. They were given as matinees on weekdays at the 39th Street Theatre and the Princess Theatre. They brought Kelly to the notice of Alexander Woollcott, who recognized his promise but felt his voice still limited him. The Dunsany plays, in which Kelly figured little, were not met with much enthusiasm by New York reviewers. The plays that drew most praise were two in which Kelly had the lead: Six Who Pass While the Lentils Boil and The Birthday of the Infanta.

The Portmanteau Theatre kept offering the Dunsany plays with its other reporatory works during Winter and Spring 1917. At St. Louis, one reviewer reported "The more versatile of the Portmanteau players do not seem to find Walker an easy boss. Gregory Kelly, the youthful stage manager, was kept on the stage nearly all the time, appearing in all three plays, and having the leading roles in the first two". During June 1917, Kelly registered with the U.S. Draft, and was classified 4-F, due to a heart murmur.

=== Seventeen ===
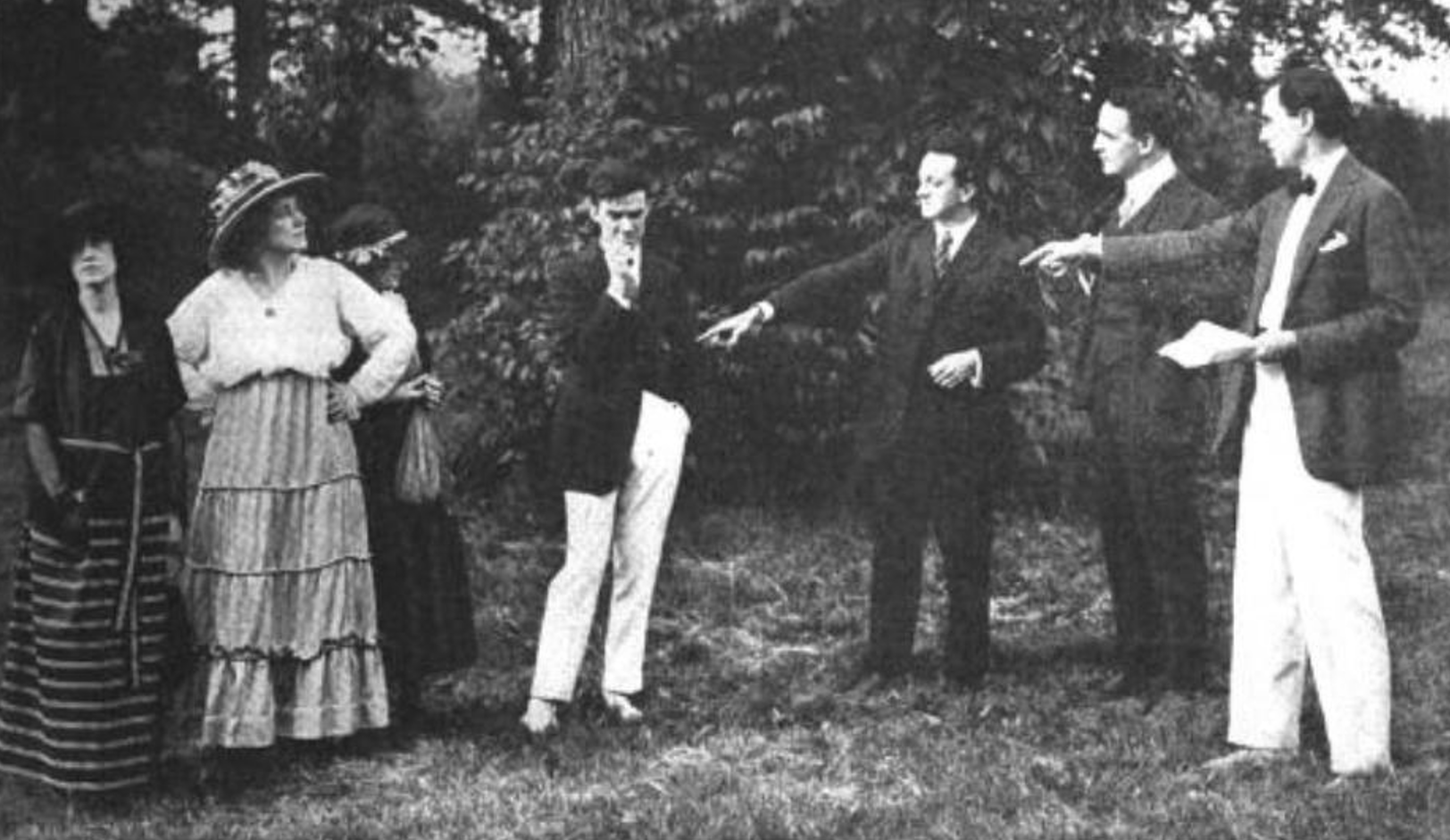

The Portmanteau Theatre settled into Indianapolis, Indiana for the summer season of 1917, where Walker hoped to tryout some new plays. Chief of these was Seventeen, based on Booth Tarkington's best selling novel. For this production Walker used a full-sized stage. The tryout in June showed the play needed cutting and female lead Aggie Rogers wasn't right for the part. When the summer tryouts ended, the company returned to Manhattan, where Walker began recasting the play. Kelly sat in on the auditions, and persuaded Walker to accept his choice for the female lead. This was Ruth Gordon, whom Walker initially didn't like.

The shortened and recast play had immediate success in its opening tour, playing an extended run in Chicago from October 1, 1917, through mid-December. It premiered on Broadway during January 1918, where it ran for over 250 performances. Kelly drew good reviews from most critics, though one decried a lack of spontaneity in his playing.

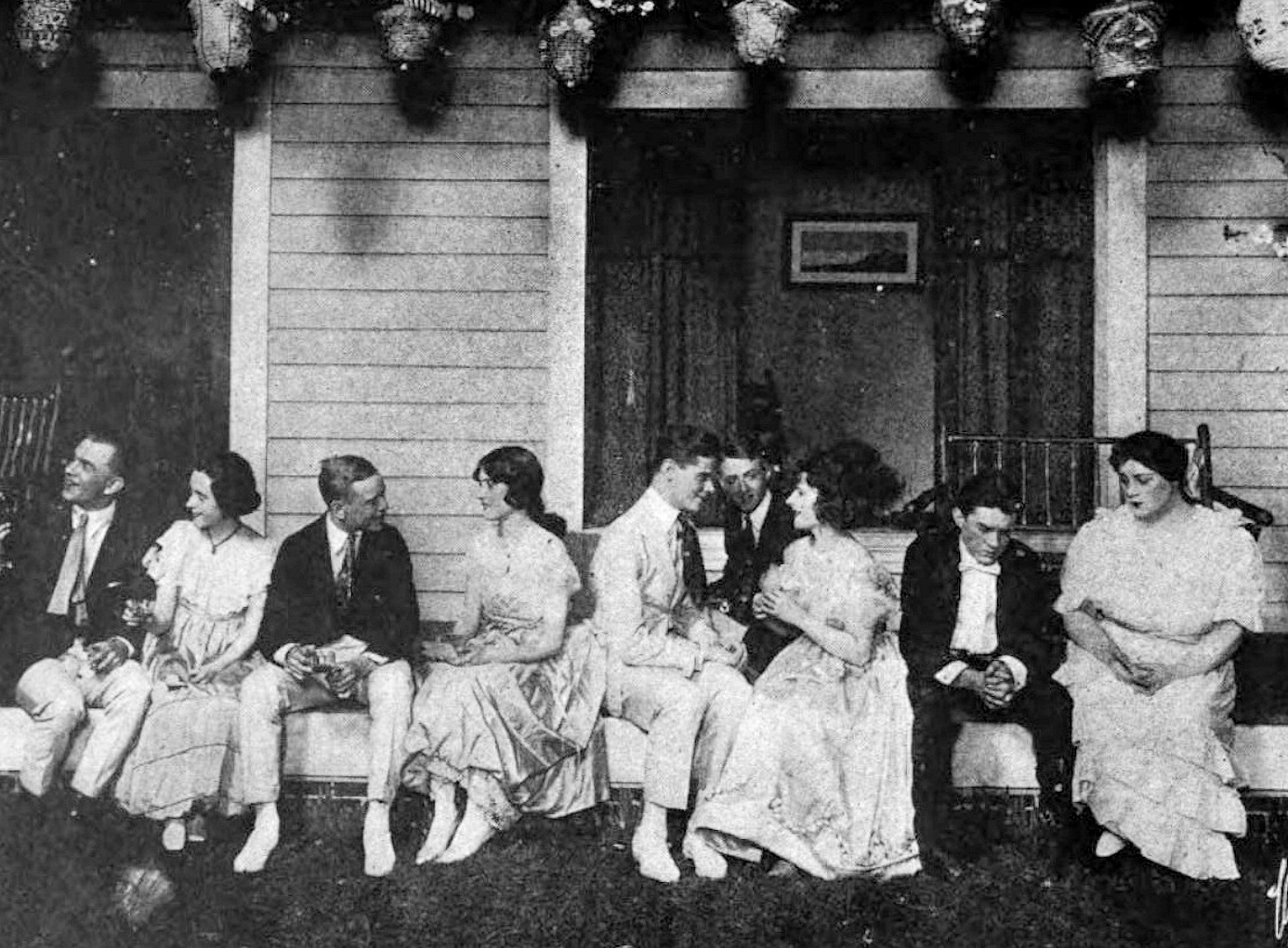

While most of the production company went on tour in September 1918, Walker assigned Kelly to the lead of Jonathan Makes a Wish, which debuted on Broadway that same month. This was a Walker written fantasy in three acts, which fell down badly in the second, according to Heywood Broun. Broun said the principal character Jonathan, (Note: The play was based on Stuart Walker's own boyhood.) played "sympathetically" by Kelly, aroused little interest compared to supporting roles performed by Edgar Stehli and George Gaul. The play was withdrawn after twelve days, and Kelly resumed his lead in the touring Seventeen.

Kelly and Ruth Gordon were back in New York City with the Seventeen tour when they got married on December 23, 1918. They continued with Seventeen until the tour finally ended in Spring 1919, after which they spent two months resting in Christmas Cove, Maine. They did some summer season plays for what was now called The Stuart Walker Company, then resumed touring with Seventeen until November 1919.

=== Clarence and Dulcy ===
Kelly and Gordon had stuck with Stuart Walker throughout the long run of Seventeen, but Walker's next production was a rare miss by Guy Bolton and P. G. Wodehouse, based on the latter's novel Piccadilly Jim. The play stumbled through some dismal tryouts, and as word spread of its weak appeal, Walker found the Shubert's were booking them into less desirable theaters in small markets. Trying to boost the play's appeal, Walker hired a well-known character actor for $400 a week, angering Kelly, whose top pay had been $250 during Seventeen.

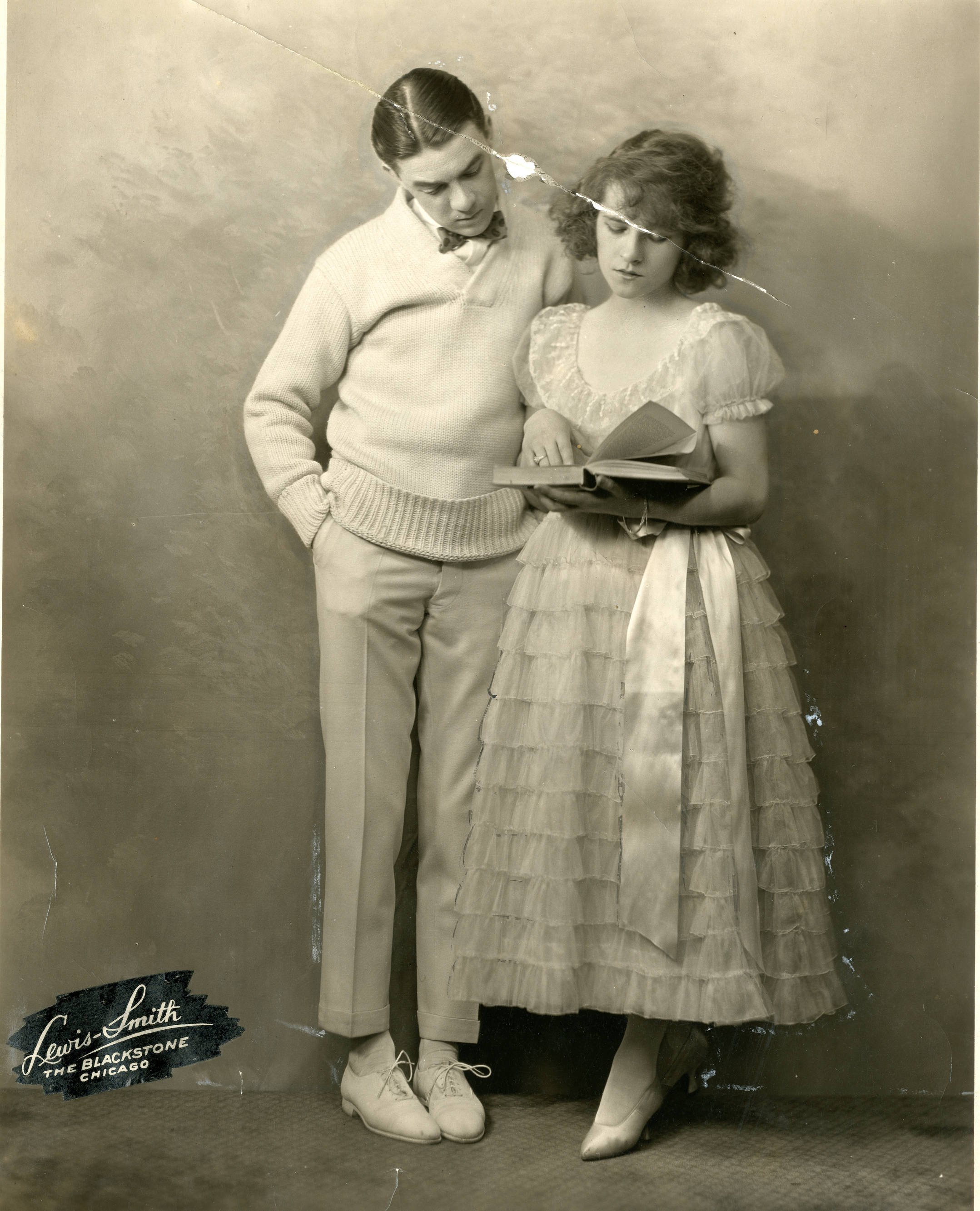

Producer George C. Tyler, having heard Piccadilly Jim was floundering, offered Kelly and Gordon leads in the second company for the new Broadway hit Clarence, at $500 and $150 a week respectively. Gordon urged Kelly to accept. Tyler made it easy for them, by arranging rehearsal schedules in New York City so the couple could commute down to Washington, D. C. for the last few performances of Piccadilly Jim. At first Gordon was nervous about following Helen Hayes in the role of Cora Wheeler, so much so that Tyler actually gave her notice in Chicago. But Kelly persuaded Tyler to hold off, and with coaching was able to get Gordon up to speed in the part. Kelly and Gordon played Chicago in Clarence starting January 1920, and toured with the second company for a year, finishing up in January 1921. A typical reviewer's appraisal of the tour's performance was that: "Robert Adams... made new friends by his Clarence. The real fun of the piece, however, was brought out by Gregory Kelly as Bobby Wheeler... and Ruth Gordon, who delightfully enacts Bobby's sister, Cora".

Clarence finished in November 1920. While Gordon recovered from a leg-straightening operation, producer Tyler cast Kelly to support Lynn Fontanne in Dulcy, a new three-act comedy by George S. Kaufman (Note: Tyler had given Kaufman his start in playwriting, and continued to back him despite some early misfires.) and Marc Connelly. It was based on the fictional character Dulcinea, a chatterbox bromide, created by newspaper columnist Franklin P. Adams. Kelly would get $650 a week. The play had a week-long tryout in Indianapolis at English's Opera House, starting February 14, 1921. Immensely popular in Indianapolis, Kelly was forced to make many curtain calls on opening night, which the theatre manager had designated "Gregory Kelly Night". It was a trying situation for Lynn Fontanne, who was the star. The production then opened at the Cort Theatre in Chicago on February 20, 1921. Kelly left the play in early April, to prepare for his new company's summer season.

=== Stock company ===
While still playing in Dulcy, Kelly incorporated the Gregory Kelly Stock Company in Indianapolis, with a capitalization of $3000. He leased English's Opera House for the summer season and recruited cast members. (Note: This initially included Percy Helton, Owen Meech, Byron Beasley, Willard Barton, Harry Wagstaff Gribble, Vera Fuller Mellish, Elizabeth Black, Frank Bertrand, William Sheafe, Harry Sothern, Angela Ogden, Florence Murphy, Howard Hill, and Beulah Bondy, with Wallis Clark and Wallace Ford brought on later.) The first week's play was Clarence, with Ruth Gordon reprising her role of Cora, but with Kelly taking the name part, and Percy Helton as Bobby. The performance was good, and unmarred by the normal stock company mishaps, according to the local reviewer, who also complimented Kelly and Gordon on their maturing skill. Later reviews of other plays were also generally positive, including one which had Eugene Stockdale (stage name of Stuart Walker) in its cast.

The Gregory Kelly Stock Company closed its season in early July after twelve weeks of performances, and Kelly rejoined the Dulcy production, in time for its Broadway premiere at the Frazee Theatre on August 13, 1921. Though second-billed, Kelly's part in the play was small. However, he performed effectively according to McElliott in the Daily News. Arthur Pollock in The Brooklyn Daily Eagle disagreed, saying Kelly was "ineffective by virtue of trying to be too effective", and that Kelly and Fontanne "have quite terrible voices". Despite this opinion, Dulcy ran on Broadway through March 1922, then started touring.

=== The First Year and Tweedles ===
However, Kelly left that tour in order to take Frank Craven's place in The First Year at the Little Theatre in early April 1922. This was a two-week gig, with Ruth Gordon filling in for Roberta Arnold, so both leads of the long-running hit could have a vacation. Their contract with John Golden paid $750 a week, and stipulated they would head a touring company the following season. The Kellys used the time in-between to take their first overseas journey, visiting England and France. When they returned, they played the leads in the tryout for a new comedy called Bristol Glass, written for them by Booth Tarkington and Harry Leon Wilson. Produced by Robert H. McLaughlin and staged by George Farren, it had its first performance on August 7, 1922, at Cleveland's Ohio Theatre. The local reviewer praised the acting and the play, but said it was too long.

The Kellys then toured with the second company (Note: The first company, with Frank Craven and Roberta Arnold, was playing Chicago.) of The First Year in September 1922. They finished with The First Year and began rehearsing Bristol Glass in March 1923. The second tryout of Bristol Glass was again given at the Ohio Theatre in Cleveland, on April 2, 1923, with Kelly forced to give a curtain speech for author Booth Tarkington, who snuck out of the theatre to avoid it. The production then went to the Blackstone Theatre in Chicago, where the advertising now had Frank McGlynn's name first. Sheppard Butler of the Chicago Tribune called the play "thin", speculated that it was largely Tarkington's work with little by his co-author, but praised the performances of Kelly and Gordon. McGlynn, having starred in Abraham Lincoln for years, reportedly carried an air of tragic gloom into the role of Adam Tweedle, so that someone said he "played the whole second act as if he knew Booth were going to kill him in the third".

Tarkington renamed Bristol Glass to Tweedles for its Broadway premiere on August 13, 1923, at the Frazee Theatre. Burns Mantle called it "a pleasant but thin little character comedy". Arthur Pollock in The Brooklyn Daily Eagle said: "The boy is Gregory Kelly, the best of our boys on the stage, who deserves the success of Glen Hunter, though it isn't yet his, and the girl is Ruth Gordon, who also merits more in the way of success than she has ever enjoyed". Alexander Woollcott called Tweedles "a delightful and unsuccessful comedy" in a later essay, in which he praised Gordon and Kelly as "both charming and capable". Tweedles was the last play in which Kelly and Gordon performed together. Thanks to Kelly's tutelage, Gordon was now able to pursue a career independent of his. As their performing work went in different directions, so too did their personal life.

=== Musical, film, and Badges ===
Following Tweedles, Kelly starred in a new play by Caesar Dunn, called A King for a Day, which opened at the Cort Theatre in Chicago, on November 25, 1923. Despite an unenthusiastic opening night review, the play ran through January 12, 1924 at the Cort. He then joined the second company of the long-running musical Little Jessie James at Chicago's Garrick Theatre on March 4, 1924. After two months in Chicago, Kelly took over the Broadway lead for the musical at the Little Theatre, "...and the show is enhanced considerably by the change" according to one reviewer. However, four weeks later Allen Kearns returned to the role he'd created.

“His method is composed of infinite small mannerisms, in voice, movement, character definition. But within this region of himself and his peculiar characteristics and mannerisms, Mr. Kelly works with astonishing subtlety and skill. His gradations in the dialogue, his cues, his humorous inflections, his aim that never misses the effect he intends, his quality of odd pathos, defeat and bubbling spirits, and the intelligent comment that he supplies along with the convincing naturalness of his playing, can be praised as far as you like to go.” —Stark Young, review of Badges

During July 1924, Kelly was signed by Famous Players. This was for his first film, called Manhattan, to be made at the Astoria Studios in New York City. Kelly was third-billed, after Richard Dix and Jacqueline Logan, when the film was released in late October 1924. Mordaunt Hall wrote in The New York Times that Kelly "makes a part live which might hardly have been noticed at all when played by many other actors".

By the time Manhattan was released Kelly was already in rehearsals for Badges, a mystery play by Max Marcin and Edward Hammond. Kelly played the lead, a hotel clerk with correspondence school training as a detective, who mixes in with a girl involved with nefarious characters. The play had its first tryout at the Court Square Theatre in Springfield, Massachusetts on November 3, 1924. After some further tryouts, it premiered at the 49th Street Theatre on December 3, 1924. The production switched to the Ambassador Theatre then the Broadhurst before closing on February 28, 1925., and reopening two days later in Chicago, where it ran for another two months.

=== The Butter and Egg Man ===
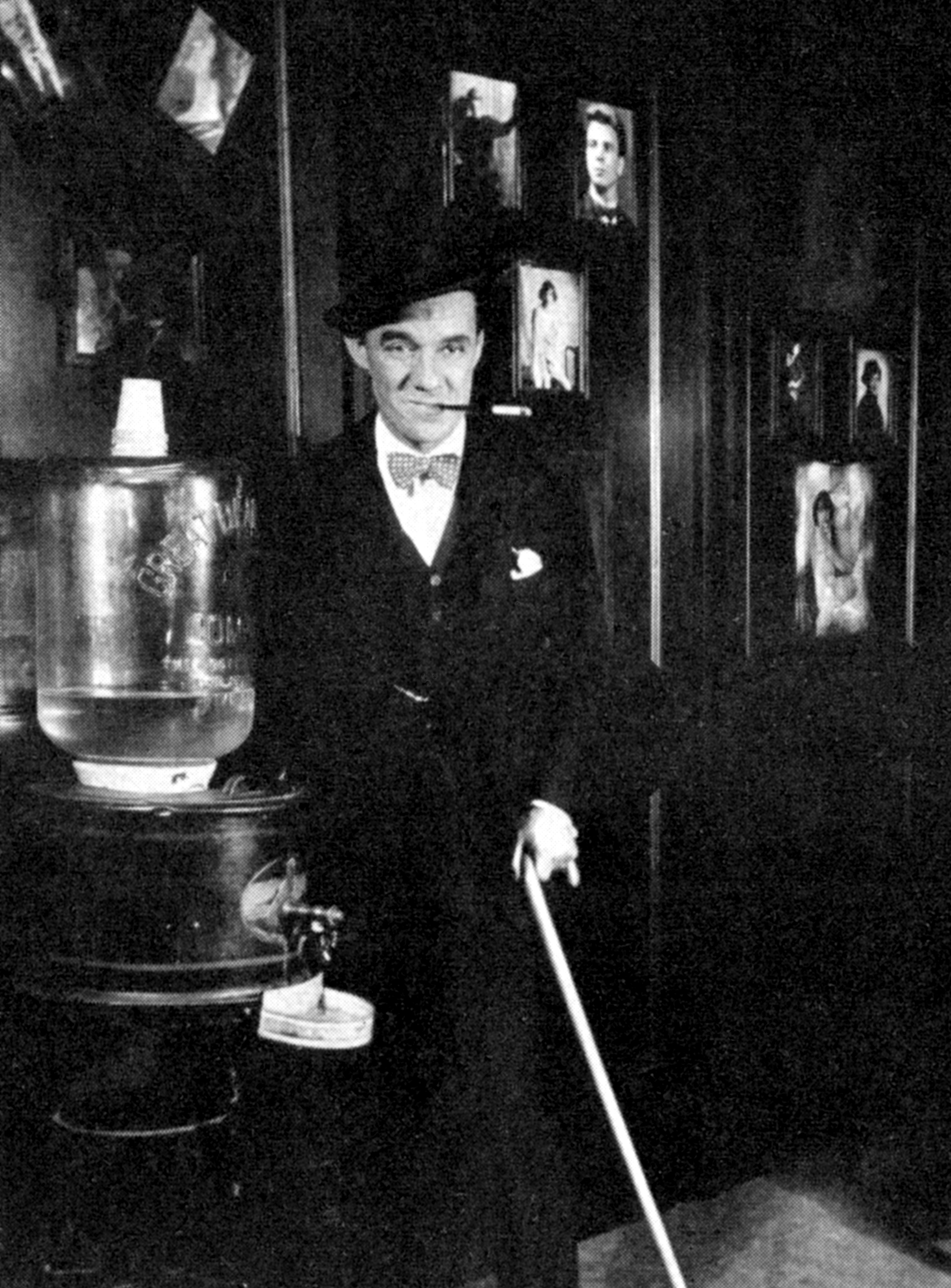

Peter Jones, the protagonist of George S. Kaufman's The Butter and Egg Man, hails from Chillecothe, Ohio, also the hometown of producer George C. Tyler. Jones possesses certain personality traits, including Midwestern optimism and a penchant for throwing money at challenges, that anyone who knew Tyler would recognize. There the resemblance ends; Kaufman was not satirizing Tyler, merely giving a nod to the man who launched his playwriting career. The Butter and Egg Man had a week's tryout at the Belasco Theatre in Washington, D. C., starting June 15, 1925. Critical appreciation for Kelly's performance and that of Lucille Webster as the producer's wife were offset by a lackluster romance with Mildred MacLeod that slowed down the third act.

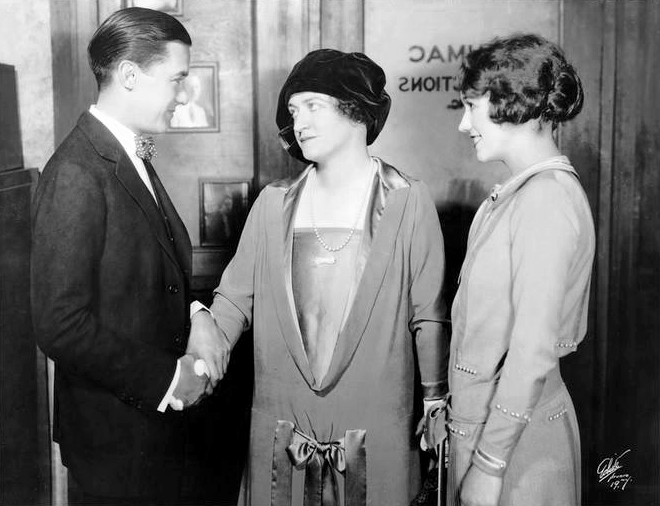

The romantic interest for Kelly's character was recast with Sylvia Field by the time the show hit Broadway, on September 23, 1925, at the Longacre Theatre. Produced by Crosby Gaige, and directed by James Gleason, it was an immediate hit with audiences and critics. One critic noted the play was "not much more than a sucession of bright jokes and wise cracks hung together on the thread of an obvious plot", at which the "audience laughed uproariously". Arthur Pollock thought "Mr. Kaufman has little feeling for design in his dramatic writing and is willing to sacrifice character for a joke".

Most critics concentrated on Kaufman's writing in their reviews, giving only a final paragraph plaudit to Sylvia Field, Lucille Webster, Gregory Kelly, and others. It was left to another actor to remark on the playing. Alexander Woollcott recounted how Charlie Chaplin, sitting next to him on opening night, followed Kelly's performance closely, saying "My God! There's an actor for you! What's his name?".

The Butter and Egg Man was a true Broadway success, running through April 17, 1926 for 250 performances then immediately going on tour, starting with Brooklyn. While still playing in New York for The Butter and Egg Man, Kelly would take the midnight train to Philadelphia to be ready for the next morning's shooting of his second film for Famous Players, The Show-Off. As the day's filming finished, he would catch the commuter train back to New York for the evening performance. Kelly continued touring in The Butter and Egg Man through February 1927.

== Personal character ==
Madge Kennedy, who co-starred with Kelly in Badges, said there was a fierce competition between him and her dog as to who could make the most grotesque faces. Kelly was once swept up in a reporter's random survey of public library patrons. To the reporter's question of his favorite book, Kelly answered Main Street by Sinclair Lewis. Aside from the surprise of finding a famous actor browsing books, the article also showed him wearing glasses, something no publicity photo ever did. Gordon complained to another reporter about Kelly's habit of folding book pages in half to mark his place, particularly embarrassing when the book was borrowed. She called him "Gentle Gregory", for he refused to be drawn into quarrels, even with her. His heart kept him out of the military, but his career was physically strenuous and he enjoyed tennis.

Samuel Hopkins Adams, in his 1945 biography of Alexander Woollcott, said Kelly "...was not only a rising young actor, but a singularly fine and winning character". Mrs. Fiske referred to him as "Gentle, boyish little Gregory, with very little to say", and declared he hadn't "a particle of egotism or silly pride". Booth Tarkington wrote of Kelly: "He was the most appealing and charming of men. Wistful, self-obliterative, witty, he seemed, in a room full of people, the one person who best understood all the others".

== Death and legacy ==
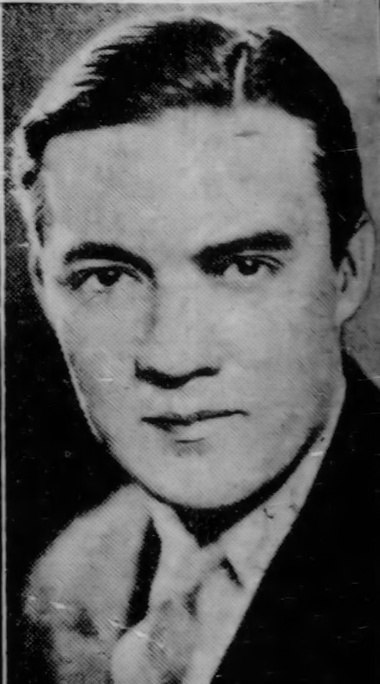

Mrs. Fiske wrote that the last time she saw Kelly was after a matinee in Chicago, where she found him "half hiding in the darkened wings. As he was leaving I asked him how he was, and he gave a little mischievous look, put his finger on his lips and said 'I've been warned'."

While performing on tour in Pittsburgh with The Butter and Egg Man, Kelly suffered a heart attack on Friday afternoon, February 25, 1927. The tour was abandoned, while Kelly rested in a Pittsburgh hospital. Ruth Gordon had him moved to the Harbor Sanitarium in Manhattan, where he remained except for visits to the Maine coast as his condition permitted. He died on Saturday night, July 9, 1927, Gordon having rushed to his bedside after performing Act II of Saturday's Children at the Booth Theatre.

Kelly's death, though preceded by a long period of illness, was still a shock to those who knew and admired him. Alexander Woollcott and Neysa McMein were awoken at Neshobe Island by a telegram messenger with the news, and spent the rest of the night talking about Kelly. Woollcott later wrote a memorial essay, in which he said: "I wish, too, I could find words for a final paragraph that would tell you how brave, how sensitive, how courteous a gentleman Gregory Kelly was".

== Stage credits ==
Plays produced by others in which Kelly performed, by year of his first involvement.
Year	Play	Role	Venue	Notes/Sources
1904	The Light That Lies in Woman's Eyes	A Boy	Criterion Theatre; Touring company	This was by E. H. Sothern, produced by Charles Frohman.
1904	After Midnight	Gerald Brooks	Park Theatre; Touring company	Kelly toured off and on in this four-act melodrama from September 1904 through February 1906.
1908	School Days	Johnny Boston Beans	Touring company Circle Theatre	Three-act musical was Kelly's professional home from Sept 1908 through April 1909.
1910	The Pillars of Society	Olaf Bernick	Lyceum Theatre; Touring company	At age 18, Kelly played a 13-year-old boy.
1910	The Green Cockatoo	Alban, Chevalier de la Tremouille	Lyceum Theatre	One-act satire by Arthur Schnitzler, set in a caberet during the Fall of the Bastille.
1910	Becky Sharp	Tommy Raikes	Touring company Lyceum Theatre	Four-act revival of an 1899 play by Langdon Mitchell.
1911	Kismet	Amru's Apprentice; Begger Kasim	Knickerbocker Theatre; Touring company	Kelly was with this production from December 1911 through October 1914.
1914	Just Herself (Note: The working title was The Young Idea.)	Raymond	Playhouse Theatre	Three-act comedy by Ethel Watts Mumford was closed when Fiske went bankrupt.
1915	The Taming of the Shrew	Tailor	Touring company	
1915	Twelfth Night	Valentine / Fabian	Touring company	
1915	The Merchant of Venice		Touring company	
1916	Six Who Pass While the Lentils Boil	The Boy	Touring company	Kelly was the lead for this one-act fantasy by Stuart Walker.
1916	Gammer Gurton's Needle	Doctor Rat, the Curate	Touring company	Five-act comedy from 16th Century anonymous author.
1916	The Trimplet (Note: A "trimplet", according to Walker, was the sunbeam that punched a hole into a shadow.)	You	Touring company	A one-act "dream play" by Stuart Walker, with Kelly "planted" in audience.
1916	Nevertheless	A Boy	Touring company	Three-character farce by Stuart Walker is described as "an interlude" (Note: Brief pieces, played in front of the curtain.) between plays.
1916	The Lady of the Weeping Willow Tree	Riki	39th Street Theatre; Touring company	Three-act play by Stuart Walker set in a fairy-tale Japan of long ago.
1916	The Birthday of the Infanta	The Fantastic	Touring company	One-act play dramatized from an Oscar Wilde short work.
1916	The Very Naked Boy	Little Brother	Touring company	Another brief three-character "interlude" by Stuart Walker has Kelly in title role.
1916	The Gods of the Mountain	A Beggar	39th Street Theatre; Touring company	Three-act play by Lord Dunsany about seven beggars who court disaster thru impiety.
1916	The Golden Doom	A Spy	39th Street Theatre; Touring company	An oriental fantasy by Lord Dunsany; a boy's scrawl is taken for an omen of the Gods.
1916	King Argimenes and the Unknown Warrior	Zarb, a Slave	Princess Theatre; Touring company	Play by Lord Dunsany
1917	Seventeen	Willie Baxter	Touring company Booth Theatre	Kelly's breakthrough role established him as a Broadway lead and gave Ruth Gordon her first leading part.
1918	Jonathan Makes a Wish	Jonathan Clay	Touring company Princess Theatre	Though the lead, Kelly was strait-jacketed by poor writing and having to play a fourteen-year-old in this Stuart Walker three-act comedy.
1919	Too Many Cooks		Murat Theatre	Summer season in Indianapolis with a 1914 farce by Frank Craven.
1919	Kick In	Charlie	Murat Theatre	Summer season in Indianapolis with a 1914 melodrama by Willard Mack.
1919	Nothing But the Truth	Bobby Bennett	Murat Theatre	Summer season in Indianapolis with a 1916 Broadway farce.
1919	Fair and Warmer	Billy Bartlett	Murat Theatre	Summer season revival of 1915 Broadway comedy by Avery Hopwood.
1919	The Fortune Hunter	Nat Duncan	Murat Theatre	Summer season revival of 1909 comedy by Winchell Smith.
1919	Piccadilly Jim	Jimmy Crocker	Murat Theatre; Touring company	Even the authors gave up on this play after seeing it performed.
1920	Clarence	Bobby Wheeler	Blackstone Theatre; Touring company	
1921	Dulcy	William Parker	English's Opera House; Cort Theatre; Frazee Theatre	
1922	The First Year	Thomas Tucker	Little Theatre; Touring company	
1922	Bristol Glass	Julian Castlebury	Ohio Theatre	Tryout of Booth Tarkington comedy written for Kelly and Gordon, eventually renamed Tweedles.
1923	A King for a Day	Any Whittaker	Cort Theatre	Kelly is a small town shoe clerk and inventor.
1924	Little Jessie James	Tommy Tinker	Garrick Theatre; Little Theatre	After a stint with the second company, Kelly moved to Broadway for a month.
1924	Badges	Franklyn Green	Court Square Theatre; 49th Street Theatre	Three-act mystery drama starred Kelly as an amateur detective.
1925	The Butter and Egg Man	Peter Jones	Longacre Theatre	

Plays produced, directed, and performed by Kelly during 1921 for his stock company.
Year	Play	Role	Venue	Notes/Sources
1921	Clarence	Clarence	English's Opera House	First production of the Gregory Kelly Stock Company.
1921	The Little Minister	Gavin Dishart	English's Opera House	Kelly's Stock Company revived an 1897 play based on J. M. Barrie's 1891 novel.
1921	Seven Keys to Baldpate	Billy McGee	English's Opera House	Kelly's Stock Company performed this 1913 satire of melodrama.
1921	A Tailor-Made Man	John Paul Bart	English's Opera House	1917 Harry James Smith comedy played by Kelly's Stock Company.
1921	Scrambled Wives	John Chiverick	English's Opera House	Ruth Gordon starred in three-act 1920 comedy by Adelaide Matthews and Martha M. Sally.
1921	Happiness	Fernoy McDonagh	English's Opera House	Gordon also led this 1914 comedy by J. Hartley Manners, revived by Kelly's Stock Company.
1921	Turn to the Right	Muggs	English's Opera House	Revival of 1916 Broadway melodrama by Winchell Smith and John E. Hazzard.
1921	Adam and Eva	Adam Smith	English's Opera House	Three-act 1919 comedy by Guy Bolton and George Middleton.
1921	A Prince There Was	Charles Martin	English's Opera House	The Kelly Stock Company played this 1918 comedy by George M. Cohan.
1921	Fair and Warmer	Billy Bartlett	English's Opera House	
1921	Romeo and Juliet	Romeo	English's Opera House	The excerpted balcony scene, performed with Gordon as Juliet.
1921	The Hottentot	Sam Harrington	English's Opera House	This was a 1920 comedy by Willie Collier and Victor Mapes.
1921	Just Suppose	A Prince of Wales (Note: This was meant to be a generic Prince of that title, not the incumbent of that time.)	English's Opera House	With Gordon as the Virginia girl for whom the incognito prince falls. Based on a 1920 play by A. E. Thomas.

== Filmography ==
- Manhattan (1924) – Kelly's film debut was a weak gangster story in which he was third-billed.
- The Show-Off (1926)

== Bibliography ==
- Alexander Woollcott. Enchanted Aisles. G. P. Putnam's Sons, The Knickerbocker Press, 1924. – Contains essay "Mr. Tarkington" which discusses Tweedles.
- Alexander Woollcott. Going to Pieces. G. P. Putnam's Sons, The Knickerbocker Press, 1928. – Contains essay "In Memoriam-- Gregory Kelly".
- George C. Tyler and J. C. Furnas. Whatever Goes Up. Bobbs Merrill, 1934.
- Beatrice Kaufman and Joseph Hennessy, eds. The Letters of Alexander Woollcott. Viking Press, 1944.
- Samuel Hopkins Adams. A. Woollcott: His Life and Times. Reynal & Henderson, 1945.
- Ruth Gorden. My Side: The Autobiography of Ruth Gordon. Harper & Row, 1976. ISBN 0-06-011618-8.
