= Adam's Rib =

1949 film by George Cukor

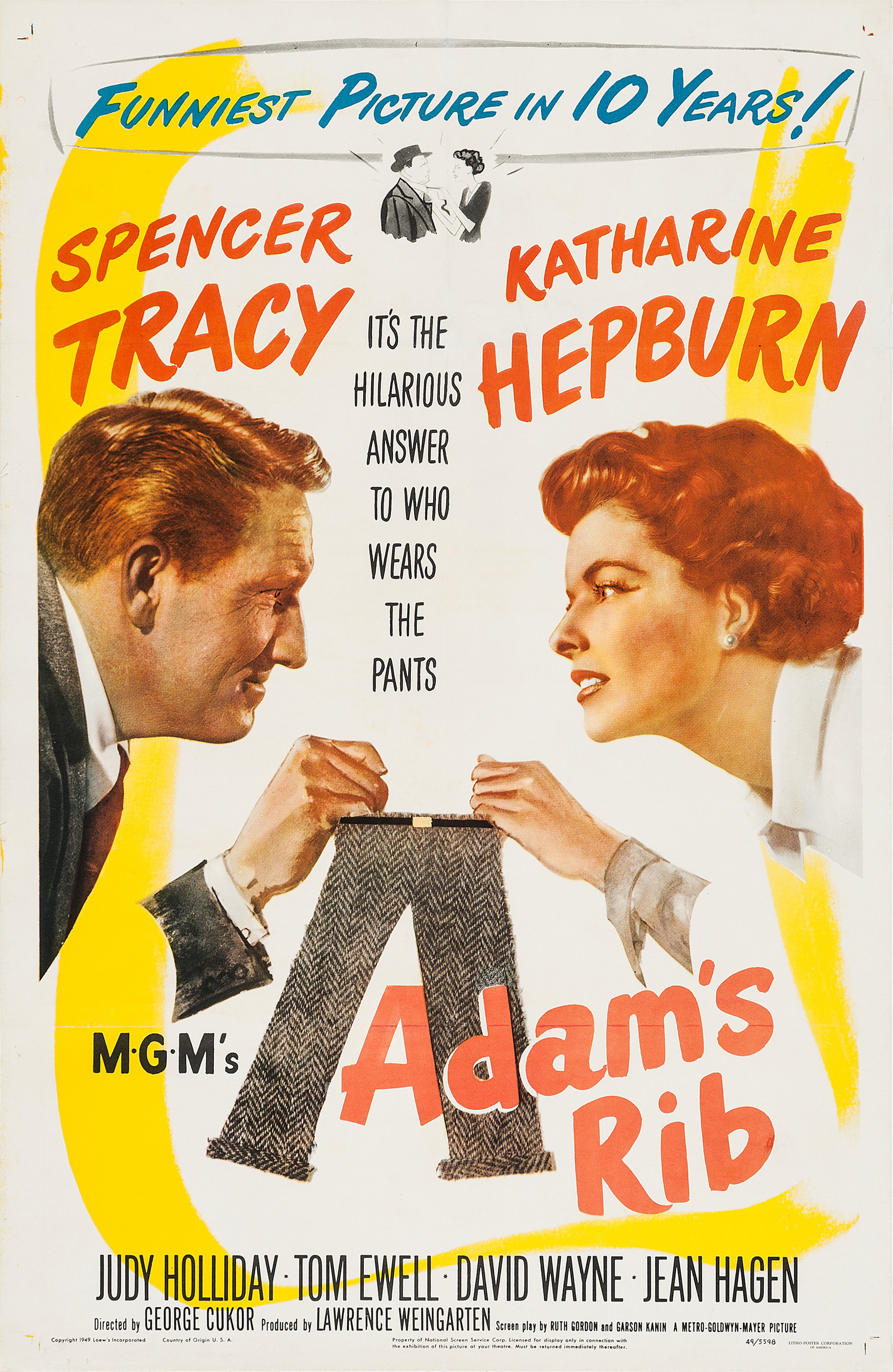
- Theatrical release poster
- Directed by: George Cukor
- Written by: Ruth Gordon; Garson Kanin
- Produced by: Lawrence Weingarten
- Starring: Spencer Tracy; Katharine Hepburn; Judy Holliday; Tom Ewell; David Wayne; Jean Hagen
- Cinematography: George J. Folsey
- Edited by: George Boemler
- Music by: Miklós Rózsa
- Production company: Metro-Goldwyn-Mayer
- Distributed by: Loew's Inc.
- Release date: November 18, 1949
- Running time: 101 minutes
- Country: United States
- Language: English
- Budget: $1,728,000
- Box office: $3,947,000

Adam's Rib is a 1949 American romantic comedy-drama film by director George Cukor from a screenplay written by Ruth Gordon and Garson Kanin. It stars Spencer Tracy and Katharine Hepburn as married lawyers who come to oppose each other in court. Judy Holliday co-stars as the third lead in her second credited movie role. Also featured are Tom Ewell, David Wayne, and Jean Hagen. The music was composed by Miklós Rózsa, and the song "Farewell, Amanda" was written by Cole Porter.

The film was well received upon its release and is considered a classic romantic comedy. It ranked at No. 22 on the AFI's 100 Years...100 Laughs list. In 1992, it was selected for preservation in the United States National Film Registry by the Library of Congress as being "culturally, historically, or aesthetically significant."

== Plot ==
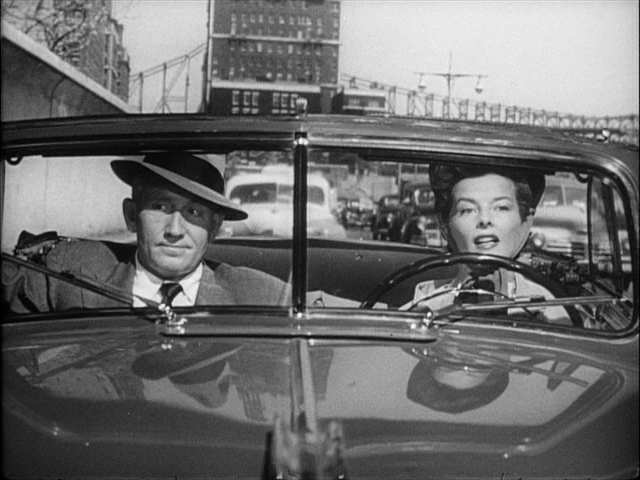
Tracy and Hepburn as Adam and Amanda

Doris Attinger follows her husband with a gun in Manhattan one day, suspecting he is having an affair with another woman. In her rage, she fires wildly and blindly around the room and at the couple multiple times. One of the bullets hits her husband in the shoulder. His lover escapes unscathed.

The following morning, the married New York lawyers Adam and Amanda Bonner read about the incident in the newspaper. Adam is an assistant district attorney, while Amanda is a solo-practicing defense attorney. They argue over the case. Amanda sympathizes with the woman, particularly noting the double standard that exists for men and women regarding adultery. Adam thinks Doris is guilty of attempted murder. When Adam arrives at work, he learns that he has been assigned to prosecute the case. When Amanda hears this, she seeks out Doris and becomes her defense lawyer.

Amanda bases her case on the belief that women and men are equal, and that Doris had been forced into the situation by her husband's adultery and emotional and physical abuse. Adam thinks Amanda is showing contempt for the law, since there should never be any excuse for such criminal behavior. Tension increasingly builds at home as the two battle each other in court. The situation comes to a head as Adam feels humiliated during the trial when Amanda encourages one of her witnesses, a woman weightlifter, to lift him overhead. Later at home that evening, Adam still angry, gives Amanda an earful; he doesn't want to be married to a liberated "new woman." Having just packed his bags, he storms out of their apartment. When the verdict is returned, Amanda's plea to the jury to "judge this case as you would if the sexes were reversed" proves successful, and Doris is acquitted.

That night, Adam, who has left their upper-floor apartment, looks through its window and sees the silhouettes of his wife Amanda and their neighbor Kip Lurie, a popular singer, songwriter and piano player who has shown a keen interest in Amanda all along, and repeatedly taunted Adam, as the two of them seem to be dancing and drinking together. Adam breaks into the apartment enraged, pointing a gun at the pair. Amanda is horrified and says to Adam, "You've no right to do this – nobody does!" Adam feels he has proven his point about the injustice of Amanda's line of defense. He puts the gun in his mouth, as Amanda and Kip scream in terror. Then Adam bites a large piece off the gun and chews it. It is made of licorice. Amanda is furious with this prank and a three-way fight ensues.

Now in the midst of a divorce, Adam and Amanda reluctantly reunite for a meeting with their tax accountant. Going through their expenses for the year, they talk about their relationship in the past tense. They talk about the farm they own and recall burning the mortgage. Tears begin to roll down Adam's cheeks. Astonished and touched, Amanda gently bundles her sobbing husband out of the office and to the farm. That night, Adam announces that he has been selected as the Republican nominee for County Court Judge. Amanda jokes about running for the post as the Democratic candidate. Adam says it would make him cry and demonstrates how easily he can turn on the tears, remarking that men can use crocodile tears to manipulate people too. Amanda says there really isn't any difference between the sexes as Adam jumps in bed and closes the curtains, exclaiming otherwise.

== Cast ==
- Spencer Tracy as Adam Bonner
- Katharine Hepburn as Amanda Bonner
- Judy Holliday as Doris Attinger
- Tom Ewell as Warren Attinger
- David Wayne as Kip Lurie, songwriter and piano player
- Jean Hagen as Beryl Caighn
- Hope Emerson as Olympia La Pere, the woman weightlifter who humiliates Adam in court, at Amanda's instigation
- Clarence Kolb as Judge Reiser
- Emerson Treacy as Jules Frikke
- Polly Moran as Mrs. McGrath
- Will Wright as Judge Marcasson
- Marvin Kaplan as court stenographer (uncredited)
- Tommy Noonan as a reporter (uncredited)
- Madge Blake as Mrs. Bonner (uncredited)
- Paula Raymond as Emerald, Kip's date at party (uncredited)

== Production ==
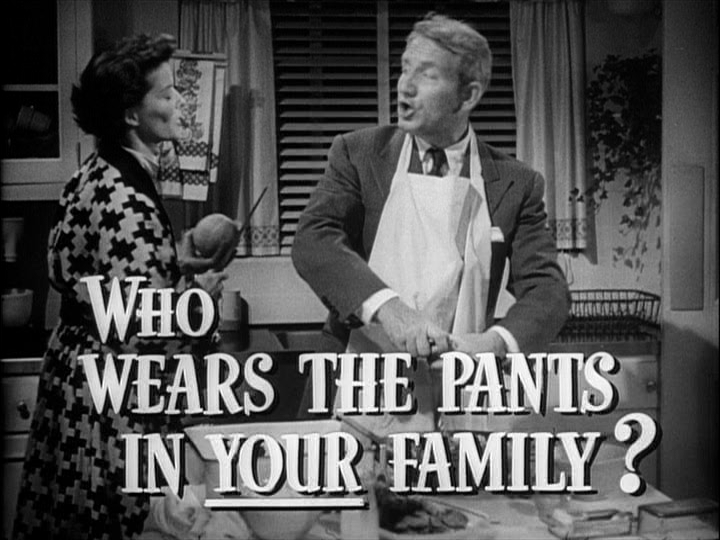
Advertising for the film focused on its 'battle of the sexes' theme, from the film's trailer.

The screenplay was written specifically as a Tracy-Hepburn vehicle (their sixth film together) by Garson Kanin and actress Ruth Gordon, married script writers who were friends of the couple. Kanin claimed that Judy Holliday initially declined her role because her character is called "fatso" in the script. According to Kanin, the story of Adam's Rib was based on the lives of Gordon's friends Dorothy and William Dwight Whitney, and of actor Raymond Massey. The Whitneys were married lawyers who represented opposing sides in Massey's high-profile divorce from actress Adrienne Allen before pursuing their own divorce in order to marry their clients from the Massey case. Kanin and Gordon saw great potential in the idea of married lawyers as adversaries, and the plot for Adam's Rib was developed. Other titles for the film were Love is Legal and Man and Wife. The MGM front office quickly vetoed the latter as dangerously indiscreet.

Kanin also recalled that Cole Porter refused to write a song for Madelaine, as Hepburn's character was originally named, but proceeded when the character's name was changed to Amanda. The change allowed Porter to quickly revise a tune he had written during his 1940 adventure in the South Pacific and later discarded as mediocre — "So Long, Samoa." In June 1949, Hollywood Reporter wrote that Porter and MGM agreed to donate all profits from the song, rechristened "Farewell, Amanda," to the Runyon Cancer Fund.

Although set in New York, Adam's Rib was filmed mainly on MGM's stages in Culver City, California. However, location shooting occurred in various parts of New York City, including at the Women's House of Detention where Doris Attinger is imprisoned after shooting her husband, and at Gordon and Kanin's farm in Connecticut.

Hepburn and Kanin encouraged Judy Holliday to play the role of Doris, and Columbia Pictures president Harry Cohn considered her performance a screen test for the lead role in the planned film adaptation of Kanin's play Born Yesterday, in which Holliday had starred during its Broadway run. Receiving positive notices for Adam's Rib, Holliday was cast in the Born Yesterday film, for which she won the Academy Award for Best Actress.

== Reception ==
According to MGM records, the film earned $2,971,000 in the US and Canada and $976,000 elsewhere, resulting in a profit of $826,000.

Variety staff reviewing the film on December 31, 1949, praised the "...bright comedy success, belting over a succession of sophisticated laughs...This is the sixth Metro teaming of Tracy and Hepburn, and their approach to marital relations around their own hearth is delightfully saucy. A better realization on type than Holliday's portrayal of a dumb Brooklyn femme doesn't seem possible."

On review aggregator website Rotten Tomatoes, the film has a "Fresh" score of 96% based on 28 reviews, with an average rating of 8.04/10; its consensus for the film says: "Matched by Garson Kanin's witty, sophisticated screenplay, George Cukor, Spencer Tracy, and Katherine [sic] Hepburn are all in top form in the classic comedy Adam's Rib."

In his Movie Guide, film critic Leonard Maltin gives the film four out of four stars, describing it as "[o]ne of Hollywood's greatest comedies about the battle of the sexes, with peerless Tracy and Hepburn supported by movie newcomers Holliday, Ewell, Hagen, and Wayne."

== Awards and honors ==
Ruth Gordon (later of Rosemary's Baby and Harold and Maude fame) and Garson Kanin were nominated for the Academy Award for Best Story and Screenplay in 1951.

The film is recognized by American Film Institute in these lists:

- 2000: AFI's 100 Years...100 Laughs – #22
- 2008: AFI's 10 Top 10:
  - #7 Romantic Comedy Film

AFI has also honored the film's stars, naming Hepburn the greatest American screen legend among females and Tracy #9 among males.

== TV adaptation ==
Adam's Rib was adapted as a television sitcom in 1973 with Ken Howard and Blythe Danner. The series was canceled after 13 episodes.
