= Ruth Gordon =

American actress, playwright and screenwriter (1896–1985)

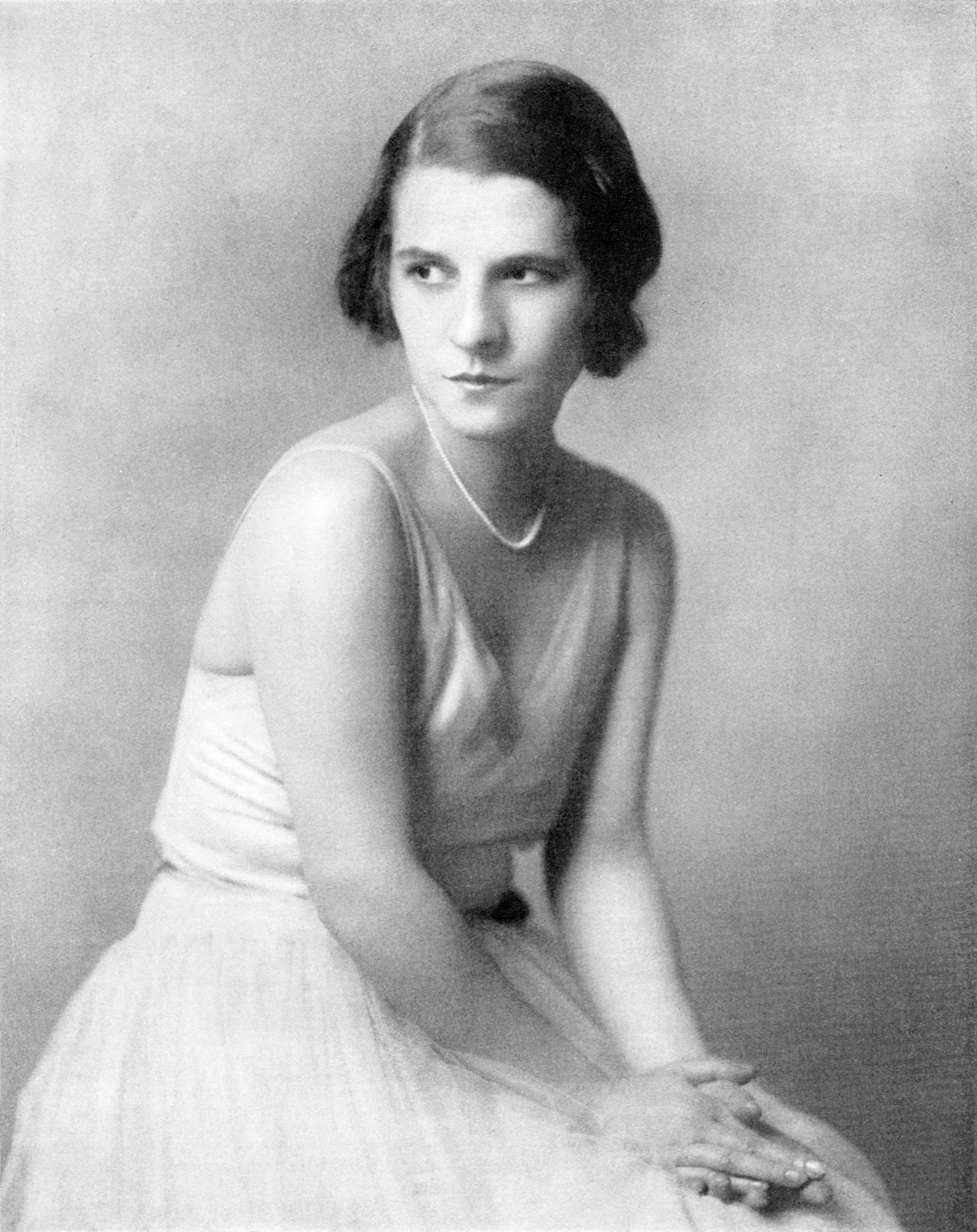
- Gordon in 1930
- Born: Ruth Gordon Jones; October 30, 1896; Quincy, Massachusetts, U.S.
- Died: August 28, 1985 (aged 88); Edgartown, Massachusetts, U.S.
- Occupations: Actress; playwright; screenwriter
- Years active: 1915–1985
- Spouses: Gregory Kelly (m. 1921; died 1927) Garson Kanin (m. 1942)
- Partner: Jed Harris (1929 – c. 1930s)
- Children: 1

Ruth Gordon Jones (October 30, 1896 – August 28, 1985) was an American actress, playwright, screenwriter and novelist, widely known for a career that spanned seven decades, beginning by performing on Broadway at age 19. Known for her nasal voice and distinctive personality, Gordon gained international recognition and critical acclaim for film roles that continued into her 70s and 80s. Her later work included performances in Rosemary's Baby (1968), What Ever Happened to Aunt Alice? (1969), Where's Poppa? (1970), Harold and Maude (1971), Every Which Way but Loose (1978), Any Which Way You Can (1980), and My Bodyguard (1980).

In addition to her acting career, Gordon wrote numerous plays, film scripts, and books, most notably co-writing the screenplay for the 1949 film Adam's Rib. Gordon won an Academy Award, a Primetime Emmy, and two Golden Globe Awards for her acting, as well as three Academy Award nominations for her writing. In 1982, she authored the novel Shady Lady.

== Early life and education ==
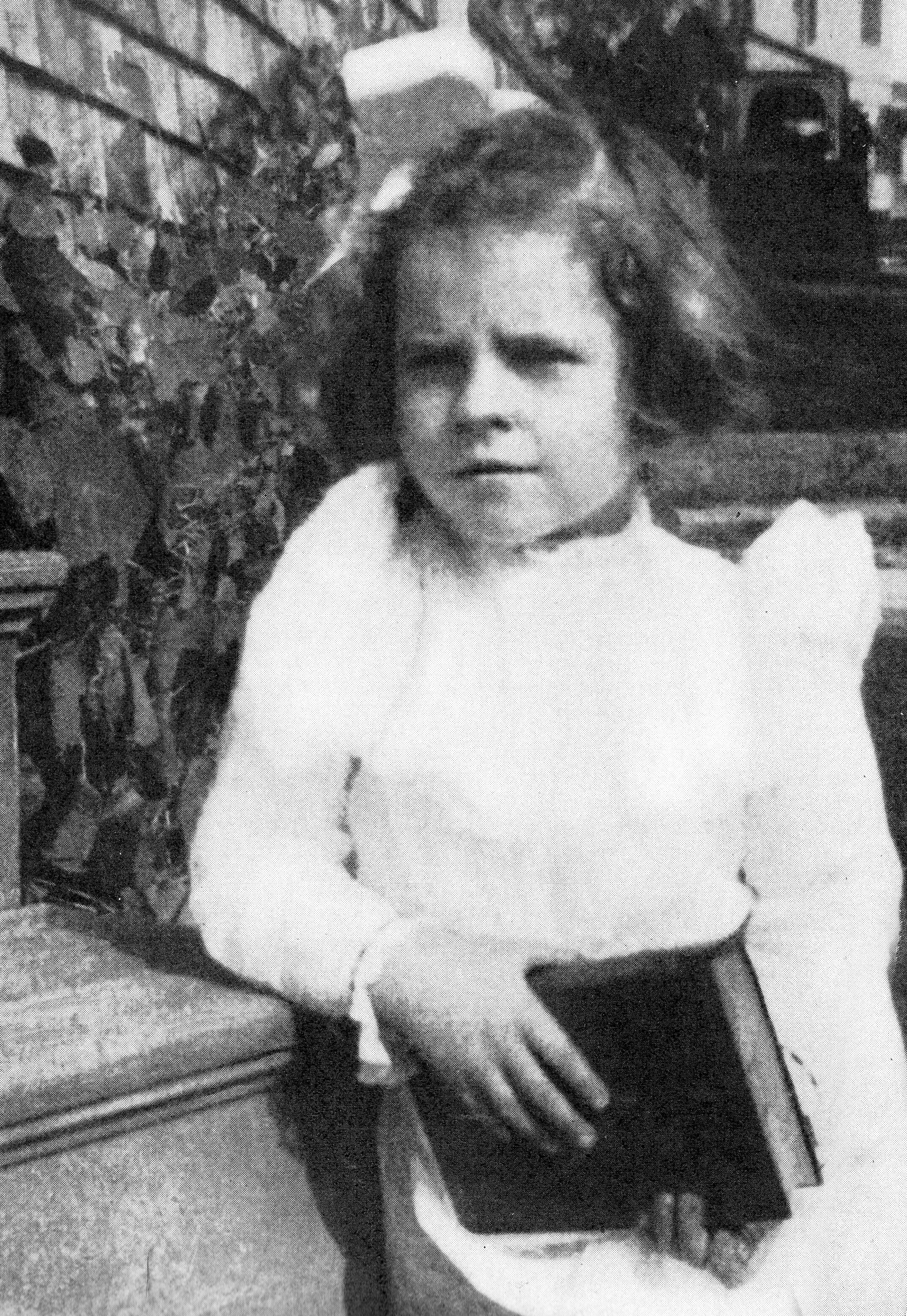
Gordon at age four

Ruth Gordon Jones was born in Quincy, Massachusetts, at 41 Winthrop Avenue, in the Wollaston section of town.

She was the child of Annie Tapley (née Ziegler) and Clinton Jones. Her only sibling was an older half-sister Claire, from her father's first marriage. She was baptized an Episcopalian. Her first appearance in the public eye came as an infant when her photograph was used in advertising for her father's employer, Mellin's Food for Infants and Invalids. Before graduating from Quincy High School, she wrote to several of her favorite actresses requesting autographed pictures. A personal reply from Hazel Dawn (whom she had seen in a stage production of The Pink Lady) inspired her to go into acting. Although her father was skeptical of her chances of success in a difficult profession, he took his daughter to New York in 1914, where he enrolled her in the American Academy of Dramatic Arts.

== Career ==
=== Silent films ===
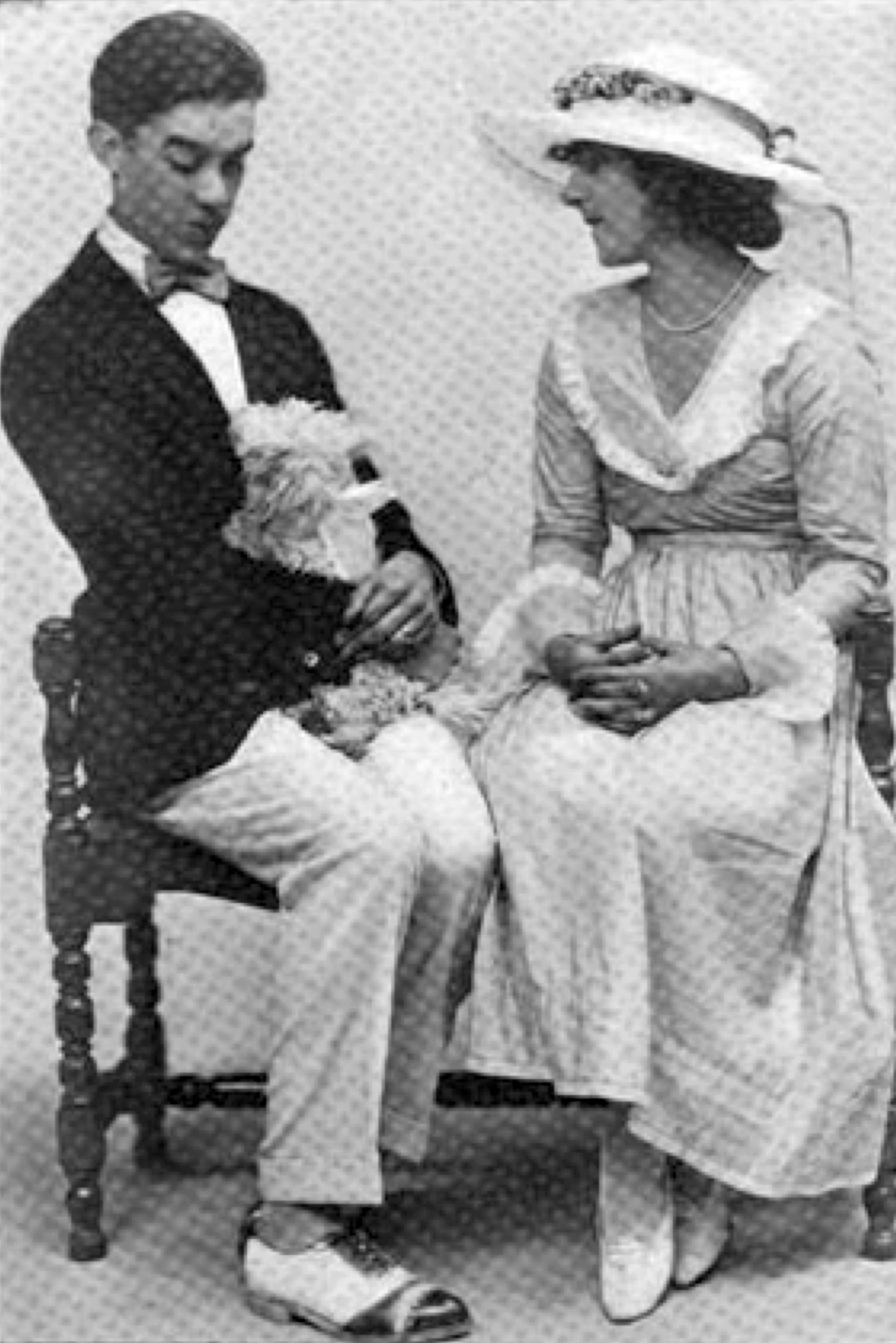
Gregory Kelly and Gordon in the 1918 Broadway production of Seventeen

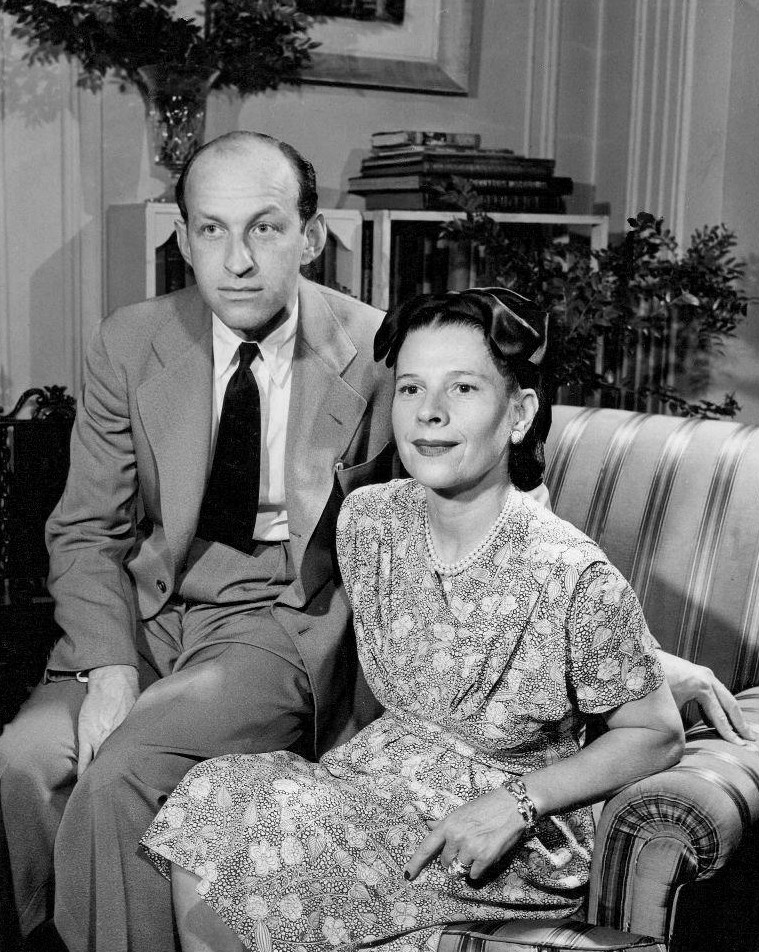
Gordon with Garson Kanin, 1946

In 1915, Gordon appeared as an extra in silent films that were shot in Fort Lee, New Jersey, including as a dancer in The Whirl of Life, a film based on the lives of Vernon and Irene Castle. The same year, she made her Broadway debut in a revival of Peter Pan, or the Boy Who Wouldn't Grow Up in the role of Nibs (one of the Lost Boys), appearing onstage with Maude Adams and earning a favorable mention from powerful critic Alexander Woollcott. He described her favorably as "ever so gay", and he became her friend and mentor.

In 1918, Gordon played opposite actor Gregory Kelly in the Broadway adaptation of Booth Tarkington's Seventeen. The pair continued to perform together in North American tours of Frank Craven's The First Year and Tarkington's Clarence and Tweedles. Then in 1921, Gordon and Kelly were wed.

In December 1920, Gordon checked into a Chicago hospital to have her legs broken and straightened to treat her lifelong bow-leggedness. After a three-month recovery, she moved to Indianapolis, where they started a repertory company.

Kelly died of heart disease in 1927 at the age of 35. Gordon at the time had been enjoying a comeback, appearing on Broadway as Bobby in Maxwell Anderson's Saturday's Children, performing in a starring role after being typecast for years as a "beautiful, but dumb" character.

In 1929, Gordon was starring in the hit play Serena Blandish when she became pregnant by the show's producer, Jed Harris. Their son, Jones Harris, was born in Paris that year and Gordon brought him back to New York. Although they never married, Gordon and Harris provided their son with a normal upbringing, and his parentage became public knowledge as social conventions changed. In 1932, the family was living discreetly in a small, elegant New York City brownstone.

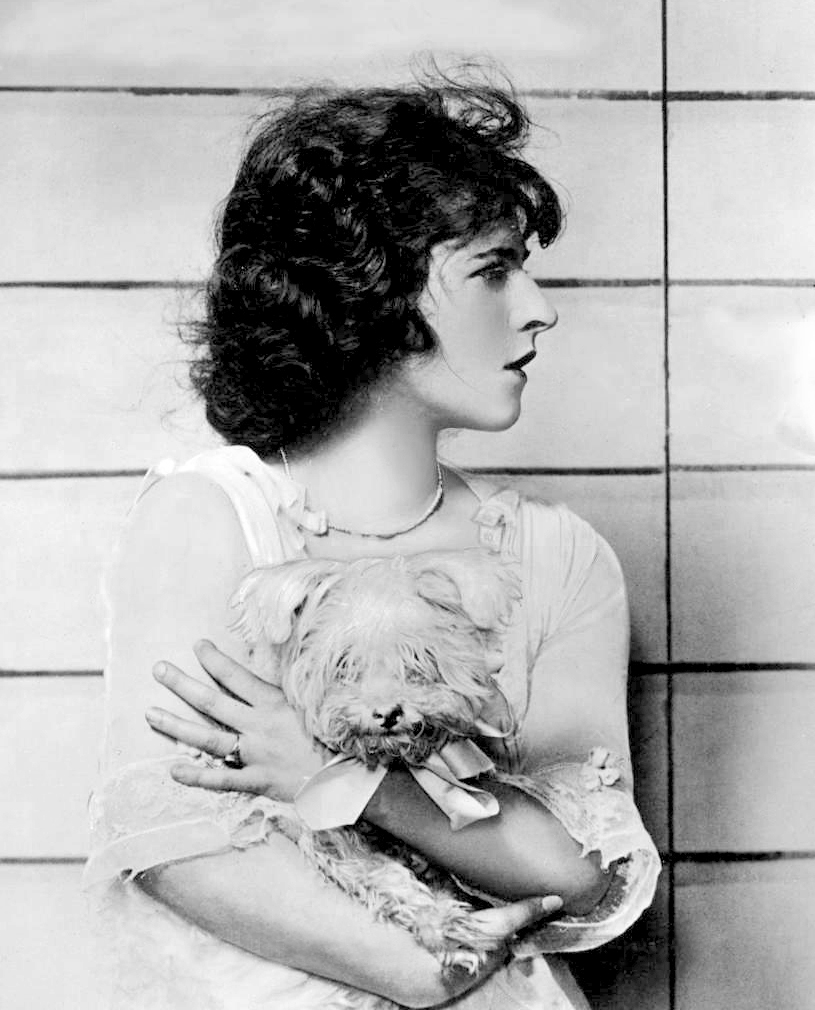
Gordon as Lola Pratt, holding her dog Flopit in the Broadway production Seventeen, 1918

Their son later married the actress and heiress Heidi Vanderbilt.

=== 1930s ===
Gordon continued to act on the stage throughout the 1930s, including notable runs as Mattie in Ethan Frome, Margery Pinchwife in William Wycherley's Restoration comedy The Country Wife at London's Old Vic and on Broadway, and Nora Helmer in Henrik Ibsen's A Doll's House at Central City, Colorado, and on Broadway.

=== 1940s ===
Gordon was signed to a Metro-Goldwyn-Mayer film contract for a brief period in the early 1930s, but did not make a movie for the company until her supporting role in Greta Garbo's final film Two-Faced Woman (1941). Gordon had better luck at other studios in Hollywood, appearing in supporting roles in a string of films, including Abe Lincoln in Illinois (as Mary Todd Lincoln), Dr. Ehrlich's Magic Bullet (as Mrs. Ehrlich) and Action in the North Atlantic, in the early 1940s. Gordon's Broadway acting appearances in the 1940s included Iris in Paul Vincent Carroll's The Strings, My Lord, Are False, Natasha in Katharine Cornell and Guthrie McClintic's revival of Anton Chekhov's Three Sisters, and leading roles in her plays Over Twenty-One and The Leading Lady.

Gordon married her second husband, writer Garson Kanin, in 1942. Gordon and Kanin collaborated on the screenplays for the Katharine Hepburn – Spencer Tracy films Adam's Rib (1949) and Pat and Mike (1952). Both films were directed by George Cukor. They were close friends of Hepburn and Tracy, and they incorporated elements of the actors' personalities in the films. Gordon and Kanin received Academy Award nominations for both of those screenplays as well as for A Double Life (1947), also directed by Cukor.

=== 1950s ===
The Actress (1953) was Gordon's film adaptation of her autobiographical play Years Ago, filmed by MGM with Jean Simmons portraying the girl from Quincy, Massachusetts, who convinced her sea captain father to let her go to New York to become an actress. Gordon wrote three volumes of memoirs in the 1970s: My Side, Myself Among Others, and An Open Book.

Gordon continued her stage-acting career in the 1950s, and she was nominated for a 1956 Tony for Best Performance by a Leading Actress in a Play for her portrayal of Dolly Levi in Thornton Wilder's The Matchmaker, a role she played in London, Edinburgh, and Berlin.

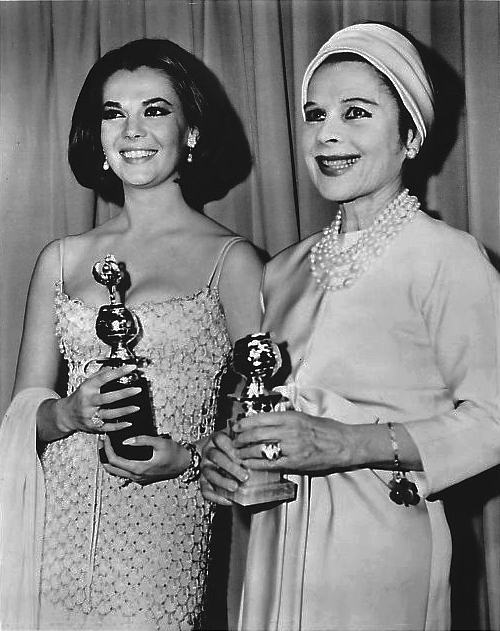
Gordon and Natalie Wood at the Golden Globes, 1966

=== 1960s ===
In 1966, Gordon was nominated for an Academy Award and won a Golden Globe Award for Best Supporting Actress for Inside Daisy Clover opposite Natalie Wood. It was her first nomination for acting. In 1969, she won an Academy Award for Best Supporting Actress for Rosemary's Baby, a film adaptation of Ira Levin's bestselling horror novel about a satanic cult residing in an Upper West Side apartment building in Manhattan. In accepting the award onstage at the 41st Academy Awards, Gordon thanked the academy by saying "I can't tell you how encouraging a thing like this is ..." (rousing laughter from the audience). At the time she had been in the business for 50 years and was 72 years old. "And thank all of you who voted for me, and to everyone who didn't: please, excuse me", she added, prompting more laughter and applause.

Gordon won another Golden Globe for Rosemary's Baby, and she was nominated again in 1971 for her role as Maude in Harold and Maude (with Bud Cort as her love interest).

=== Later career ===
She appeared in 22 more films and many television appearances through her 70s and 80s, including successful sitcoms such as Rhoda (as the mother of the unseen doorman Carlton, which earned her an Emmy nomination) and Newhart. She portrayed a murderous author on the 1977 episode Columbo: Try and Catch Me. She made countless talk-show appearances, in addition to hosting Saturday Night Live in 1977.

Gordon won an Emmy Award for an appearance on the sitcom Taxi, for a 1979 episode titled "Sugar Mama", in which her character tries to solicit the services of a taxi driver, played by series star Judd Hirsch, as a male escort.

Her last Broadway appearance was as Mrs. Warren in George Bernard Shaw's Mrs. Warren's Profession, produced by Joseph Papp at the Vivian Beaumont Theater in 1976. In the summer of 1976, Gordon starred in the leading role of her own play, Ho! Ho! Ho! at the Cape Playhouse in Dennis, Massachusetts. She had a minor role as Ma Boggs, the mother of Orville Boggs (Geoffrey Lewis), in the Clint Eastwood films Every Which Way but Loose and Any Which Way You Can.

In 1983, Gordon was awarded the Women in Film Crystal Award for outstanding women who, through their endurance and the excellence of their work, have helped to expand the role of women within the entertainment industry.

Harold and Maude, Adam's Rib, and Rosemary's Baby have been selected for preservation in the National Film Registry of the United States Library of Congress.

== Death and legacy ==
On August 28, 1985, Gordon died at her summer home in Edgartown, Massachusetts, following a stroke at age 88. Her husband of 43 years, Garson Kanin, was at her side and said that even her last day of life was typically full, with walks, talks, errands, and a morning of work on a new play. She had made her last public appearance two weeks before at a benefit showing of the film Harold and Maude and had recently finished acting in four films.

In August 1979, a small movie theater in Westboro, Massachusetts, was named the Ruth Gordon Flick. She attended the opening ceremony, standing on a bench in the lobby so she could be seen. The theater no longer exists. In November 1984, the outdoor amphitheater in Merrymount Park in Quincy, Massachusetts, was named Ruth Gordon Amphitheater in her honor.

== Acting credits ==
=== Film ===
Year	Title	Role	Notes
1915	The Whirl of Life	Extra	Uncredited
1915	Madame Butterfly	Minor Role	Uncredited
1915	Camille	Party Guest	Uncredited
1940	Abe Lincoln in Illinois	Mary Todd Lincoln	
1940	Dr. Ehrlich's Magic Bullet	Hedwig Ehrlich	
1941	Two-Faced Woman	Miss Ruth Ellis	
1943	Edge of Darkness	Anna Stensgard	
1943	Action in the North Atlantic	Mrs. Sarah Jarvis	
1965	Inside Daisy Clover	Lucile Clover	
1966	Lord Love a Duck	Stella Bernard	
1968	Rosemary's Baby	Minnie Castevet	
1969	What Ever Happened to Aunt Alice?	Alice Dimmock	
1970	Where's Poppa?	Mrs. Hocheiser	
1971	Harold and Maude	Maude Chardin	
1976	The Big Bus	Old Woman	
1978	Every Which Way but Loose	Senovia "Ma" Boggs	
1979	Boardwalk	Becky Rosen	
1979	Scavenger Hunt	Arvilla Droll	
1980	My Bodyguard	Gramma Peache	
1980	Any Which Way You Can	Senovia "Ma" Boggs	
1982	Jimmy the Kid	Bernice	
1985	Delta Pi	Mugsy	
1985	Voyage of the Rock Aliens	Sheriff	Filmed in 1983
1985	Maxie	Mrs. Lavin	
1987	The Trouble with Spies	Mrs. Arkwright	Filmed in 1984; Final film role

=== Television ===
Year	Title	Role	Notes
1950	Prudential Family Playhouse	Paula Wharton	Episode: "Over 21"
1966	Blithe Spirit	Madame Arcati	Television movie
1973	Isn't It Shocking?	Marge Savage	Television movie
1975	Kojak	Miss Eudora Temple	Episode: "I Want to Report a Dream"
1975	Rhoda	Carlton's Mother	Episode: "Kiss Your Epaulets Goodbye"
1975	Medical Story	Emily Dobson	Episode: "The Right to Die"
1976	The Great Houdini	Cecilia Weiss	Television movie
1976	Look What's Happened to Rosemary's Baby	Minnie Castevet	Television movie
1976	Emergency!	Lenore	Episode: "The Nuisance"
1977	Columbo	Abigail Mitchell	Episode: "Try and Catch Me"
1977	Saturday Night Live	Host	Episode: "Ruth Gordon/Chuck Berry"
1977	The Love Boat	Mrs. Warner	Episode: "Joker Is Mild, The/First Time Out/Take My Granddaughter, Please"
1977	The Prince of Central Park	Mrs. Miller	Television movie
1978	Perfect Gentlemen	Mrs. Cavagnaro	Television movie
1979	Taxi	Dee Wilcox	Episode: "Sugar Mama"
1980	Hardhat and Legs	Grandmother	Uncredited; also writer
1982	Don't Go to Sleep	Bernice	Television movie
1983–1984	Newhart	Blanche Devane	2 episodes

=== Theatre ===
Year	Title	Role	Notes
1916	Peter Pan	Nibs	Revival
1917	Seventeen	Lola Pratt	
1920	Clarence	Cora Wheeler	Gordon was in the second company for this production with her husband Gregory Kelly.
1923	Tweedles	Winsora	
1925	Mrs. Partridge Presents	Katherine Everitt	
1925	The Fall of Eve	Eva Hutton	
1928	Saturday's Children	Bobby	
1929	Serena Blandish	Serena Blandish	
1929	Lady Fingers	Ruth	Also in ensemble
1930	Hotel Universe	Lily Malone	
1930	The Violet and One, Two, Three	Ilona Stobri	The Violet
1931	The Wiser They Are	Trixie Ingram	
1932	A Church Mouse	Susie Sachs	
1932	Here Today	Mary Hilliard	
1933	Three-Cornered Moon	Elizabeth Rimplegar	
1934	They Shall Not Die	Lucy Wells	
1934	A Sleeping Clergyman	Harriet Marshall; Hope Cameron; Wilhelmina Cameron	
1936	Ethan Frome	Mattie Silver	
1937	The Country Wife	Mrs. Margery Pinchwife	
1938	A Doll's House	Nora Helmer	
1942	The Strings, My Lord, Are False	Iris Ryan	
1943	The Three Sisters	Natalya Ivanovna	
1944	Over 21	Paula Wharton	Also writer
1947	Years Ago		Also writer
1947	How I Wonder		Also producer
1948	The Leading Lady		Also writer
1949	The Smile of the World	Sara Boulting	
1957	The Matchmaker	Mrs. Dolly Gallagher Levi	
1960	The Good Soup	Marie-Paule I	
1963	My Mother, My Father and Me	Rona Halpern	
1965	A Very Rich Woman	Mrs. Lord	Also writer
1966	The Loves of Cass McGuire	Cass	
1974	Dreyfus in Rehearsal	Zina	
1976	Mrs. Warren's Profession	Mrs. Kitty Warren	

== Writing credits ==
Year	Title	Notes
1944	Over 21	
1946	Years Ago	
1947	A Double Life	
1948	The Leading Lady	
1948	The Ford Theatre Hour	Episode: Years Ago
1949	Adam's Rib	
1950	Prudential Family Playhouse	Episode: Over 21
1952	Pat and Mike	
1952	The Marrying Kind	
1953	The Actress	
1957	The Alcoa Hour	Episode: "A Double Life"
1960	DuPont Show of the Month	Episode: "Years Ago"
1967	Rosie!	
1973	Adam's Rib	Episode: "The Unwritten Law"
1976	Ho! Ho! Ho!	
1980	Hardhat and Legs	

== Awards and nominations ==
Year	Award	Category	Work	Result	Ref.
1947	Academy Awards	Best Original Screenplay	A Double Life	Nominated	
1950	Academy Awards	Best Original Screenplay	Adam's Rib	Nominated	
1952	Academy Awards	Best Original Screenplay	Pat and Mike	Nominated	
1965	Academy Awards	Best Supporting Actress	Inside Daisy Clover	Nominated	
1968	Academy Awards	Best Supporting Actress	Rosemary's Baby	Won	
1965	Golden Globe Awards	Best Supporting Actress – Motion Picture	Inside Daisy Clover	Won	
1968	Golden Globe Awards	Best Supporting Actress – Motion Picture	Rosemary's Baby	Won	
1971	Golden Globe Awards	Best Actress in a Motion Picture – Musical or Comedy	Harold & Maude	Nominated	
1976	Primetime Emmy Awards	Outstanding Single Performance by a Supporting Actress in a Comedy or Drama Series	Rhoda	Nominated	
1977	Primetime Emmy Awards	Outstanding Performance by a Supporting Actress in a Comedy or Drama Special	The Great Houdini	Nominated	
1979	Primetime Emmy Awards	Outstanding Lead Actress in a Comedy Series	Taxi	Won	
1985	Primetime Emmy Awards	Outstanding Individual Achievement – Informational Programming – Performing	The Secret World of the Very Young	Nominated	
1956	Tony Awards	Best Leading Actress in a Play	The Matchmaker	Nominated	
1949	Writers Guild of America Awards	Best Written Comedy	Adam's Rib	Nominated	
1950	Writers Guild of America Awards	Best Written Comedy	Adam's Rib	Nominated	
1952	Writers Guild of America Awards	Best Written Comedy	Pat and Mike	Nominated	
1952	Writers Guild of America Awards	Best Written Comedy	The Marrying Kind	Nominated	
1953	Writers Guild of America Awards	Best Written Comedy	The Actress	Nominated	

== See also ==
- List of actors with Academy Award nominations
