= Robert H. McLaughlin =

American writer (1877-1939)

Robert H. McLaughlin (1877-1939) was a novelist, playwright, theater manager, publicist, and screenwriter in the United States. He also edited the Clipper newspaper in 1907.

He led Cleveland's Success Film Company. He planned to use an Educational Film Company studio in Cleveland. He was also involved in another planned film company in Cleveland.

== Novels ==
- The Great Chadwick Bubble

== Theater ==
- Silas Marner (1910), a dramatization of George Eliot's novel
- The Sixth Commandment (1910)
- Demi-Tasse (1913)
- Pearl of Great Price
- The Eternal Magdalene (1915)
- Fires of Spring (1919)
- Decameron Night (1922) adapted from Boccaccio's Decameron

== Filmography ==
- The Eternal Magdalene (1919), adapted from his play of the same name
