= Blackhawk (radio series) =

- Genre: Radio drama, Aviation series.
- Running time: 30 minutes. (5:30 pm – 6:00 pm)
- Country of origin: USA
- Language(s): English
- Home station: ABC Radio
- Starring: Michael Fitzmaurice
- Original release: September 13 – December 27, 1950

Blackhawk was a 1950 ABC radio series adapted from the long-running Blackhawk comic book about the team of adventurous World War II aviators.

The title character led a special police force for the United Nations.

According to broadcasting researcher Harrison Boyd Summers, author of A Thirty-Year History of Programs Carried on National Radio Networks in the United States, 1926-1956, Blackhawk was an unsponsored half-hour show that aired on Wednesdays at 5:30pm. (Another source says that the program initially ran 5:30-5:55 p. m.)

With Michael Fitzmaurice (1908-1967) portraying team leader Blackhawk, the series premiered September 13, 1950 and concluded a few months later on December 27, 1950. That same year, Fitzmaurice did the voice of Superman on ABC.

Radio historian Jim Harmon remembered:

I heard the Blackhawk radio show when it was on ABC, probably about every one of its few episodes. Superman was on twice a week, and Blackhawk once a week in that time slot... I do recall Blackhawk had one different companion each episode—sometimes André, sometimes Olaf, etc. But it was the same actor, just changing his accent. The show seemed to be "okay," perhaps actually better than the short-lived half-hour Captain Midnight.

By checking the schedules of the daily "On the Radio" feature in The New York Times, radio researcher Irene Heinstein determined there were 16 episodes in the run, adding, "The programs in that time slot Monday-Friday were: Monday, Space Patrol, Tuesday, Superman, Wednesday, Blackhawk, Thursday, Superman, Friday, Space Patrol. The next listing for Blackhawk should have been January 3, 1951. However, in its time slot appeared Big Jon and Sparky, which held that time slot Monday-Friday throughout January, when I stopped looking. Checking on Monday, January 1, and Tuesday, January 2, Space Patrol and Superman had their final listings in that time slot rotation, which began Monday, September 11, 1950 on WJZ."
