= The Carrington Playhouse =

Anthology radio drama series

- Genre: Anthology
- Running time: 30 minutes
- Country of origin: United States
- Language: English
- Syndicates: Mutual
- Created by: Elaine Carrington
- Directed by: Perry Lafferty
- Produced by: Elaine Carrington
- Original release: February 5 – September 26, 1946

The Carrington Playhouse is an anthology radio drama series created by Elaine Carrington, that aired on Mutual in 1946, from February 5 through September 26.

Featured writers include Josephine Young Case Brad Crandall, Ernest Kinoy, Carroll Moore, Howard Rodman, Anne Seymour George Slavin, Jane Speed, and Winifred Wolfe, whose play was later selected by Tufts College for permanent inclusion in its library.

== Cast ==
Carrington herself appears in the series' final episode, "Shakespeare Comes to the Carrington Playhouse", a "satire on radio" penned by Ernest Kinoy. Carrington stars, opposite Procter & Gamble VP Bill Ramsey, as the Bard. Unique among the showcased authors is Anne Seymour, who was also one of the performers, starring in her own drama, "Letters from Irene".

Others who appeared on the series include Shirley Booth, Martha Scott, Ian Martin, Jimmy McCallion, Mercedes McCambridge, Frank Lovejoy, Larry Dobkin Michael Fitzmaurice, and Maurice Franklin.

== Production ==
The show was produced by Carrington and directed by Perry Lafferty, with music provided by organist John Gart.
