= Rosemary (radio series) =

American radio soap opera

- Rosemary transcription disc from July 22, 1946
- Genre: Daytime daily serial
- Country of origin: United States
- Language: English
- Syndicates: NBC Radio/CBS Radio
- Hosted by: Harry Clark
- Starring: Betty Winkler; George Keane; Marion Barney; Joan Alexander
- Created by: Elaine Carrington
- Written by: Elaine Carrington
- Original release: October 2, 1944 (NBC) – July 1, 1955 (CBS)
- Sponsored by: Procter & Gamble (Ivory Snow, Camay, Dash, Tide, Prell)

Rosemary is an American radio soap opera broadcast on NBC Radio from October 2, 1944, to March 23, 1945, and on CBS Radio from March 26, 1945, to July 1, 1955. Starring Betty Winkler as Rosemary Dawson Roberts, the program's only sponsor was Procter & Gamble, primarily for Ivory Snow dishwashing liquid, Camay soap, Dash and Tide laundry detergents and Prell shampoo. The series was created by Elaine Carrington, who had previously created Pepper Young's Family (1932–1959) and When a Girl Marries (1939–1957).

== Characters and story ==
When the program began, it focused on 20-year-old secretary Rosemary Dawson (Winkler), who supports her mother (Marion Barney) and younger sister Patti (Jone Allison). Rosemary marries journalist Bill Roberts (George Keane), a war veteran and amnesiac who later remembers his first wife Audrey (Allison) and daughter Jessica (Joan Lazer) but forgets his present with Rosemary. The show also included Rosemary's best friend Joyce Miller (Mary Jane Higby), lawyer Peter Harvey (Lawson Zerbe), and Dr. Jim Cotter (Bill Adams).

== Cast ==
Winkler and Keane met doing Rosemary and married. When Keane was forced to leave the program due to illness, Winkler left as well, and they were replaced by Robert Readick and Virginia Kaye in the roles. Most of the other characters were also portrayed by multiple actors, including Patsy Campbell as Patti; Lesley Woods and Joan Alexander as Audrey; Helen Choate as Joyce; Sydney Smith as Peter and Charles Penman as Jim.

Rosemary was complimented for its "realistic approach to life" despite its use of plot devices like amnesia, and the program got "generally higher marks" from critics than its competition.

== Australian version ==
Radio stations in Australia broadcast a version of Rosemary with Brenda Dunrich in the title role. The transcribed series originated from Sydney.

== Listen to ==
- Rosemary. Museum of Broadcast Communications. July 12, 1946. Archived from the original on March 3, 2012.
