= Blackhawk Squadron =

Fictional character

The Blackhawks
- Blackhawk leading three members of his team into battle, art by Reed Crandall

Publication information
- Publisher: Quality Comics (1941–1956); DC Comics (1957–present)
- First appearance: Military Comics #1 (August 1941)
- Created by: Chuck Cuidera; Bob Powell; Will Eisner

In-story information
- Base(s): Blackhawk Island
- Member(s): See: List of Black Squadron members

The Blackhawk Squadron (also known as the Blackhawks) is the name of a fictional team published by Quality Comics and later by DC Comics. Primarily created by Chuck Cuidera with input from both Bob Powell and Will Eisner, the team first appeared in Military Comics #1 (August 1941) and regularly starred in the eponymous Blackhawk comic book series. Originally a small team of World War II-era ace pilots of varied nationalities, both its membership and overall purpose has changed over time.

The team originally operated from a hidden base known as Blackhawk Island, flying Grumman XF5F Skyrocket fighter aircraft, were known to shout their battle cry of "Hawk-a-a-a!" while battling foes, and were typically clad in matching blue and black uniforms with the a hawk or hawk-inspired insignia. While early stories pitted them against Axis powers, they also battled their own foes which included recurring foes such as King Condor and Killer Shark, femme fatales, or battled against fantastical war machines. Later versions have also alternatively operated as an elite military unit affiliated with the United Nations and a special anti-apocalypse response team. The team would usually be led by a male individual codenamed "Blackhawk", with Lady Blackhawk given to noted women who aided the team as honorary members despite not being formally allowed to be enlisted. Later versions of the team altered this dynamic, with Lady Blackhawk being a codename for a female of high-ranking or leading status.

At the height of his popularity in the early 1940s, Blackhawk titles routinely outsold every other comic book but Superman. Blackhawk also shares the distinction of being just one of five comic book characters to be published continuously in their own titles from the 1940s up to the 1960s (the others being Superman, Batman, Wonder Woman, and The Phantom). The comic book series has spawned a film serial in 1952 which starred Kirk Alyn as Blackhawk himself, a radio series, a novel, and was once announced as a forthcoming Steven Spielberg feature film. A version of Blackhawk named Ted Gaynor appeared in the first season of the Arrowverse series Arrow, portrayed by Ben Browder.

== Publication history ==
=== Creation ===
Like many of his Golden Age and Silver Age comic book counterparts, the creation of Blackhawk has been the subject of sometimes-contentious debate. Will Eisner has at times been considered the characters' primary creator, with Eisner himself acknowledging the contributions of Chuck Cuidera and writer Bob Powell.

Over the years, Cuidera became increasingly vocal that he did much more work on Blackhawk than Eisner and that he had in fact already started creating the characters prior to joining Eisner's studio. According to Cuidera, he and Powell fleshed out the concept, deciding on everything from names and nationalities, to the characters' distinguishing traits, uniforms, and the aircraft they would fly.

In 1999, Eisner addressed his view of the matter during a Comic-Con panel:

It's not important who created it...it's the guy who kept it going, and made something out if it that's more important. Whether or not Chuck Cuidera created or thought of Blackhawk to begin with is unimportant. The fact that Chuck Cuidera made Blackhawk what it was is the important thing, and therefore, he should get the credit.

=== The Quality Comics years ===
Military Comics #18 (April 1943): art by Reed Crandall.

The Blackhawks debuted in August 1941 as the lead feature in the first issue of Quality Comics' anthology series Military Comics, billed as featuring "stories of the Army and Navy". Viewed by Will Eisner as "a modern version of the Robin Hood legend", the team's first appearance was co-written by Chuck Cuidera and Bob Powell, with art by Cuidera. Although the exact nature of Eisner, Cuidera, and Powell's individual contributions to the creation of the Blackhawks will never be known, it is confirmed that each performed some level of writing duties at different times during the first eleven issues, with Eisner working on early covers with Cuidera and Cuidera providing interior artwork.

When Cuidera joined the armed services in 1942, Reed Crandall took over as artist, beginning a long association with the characters that would last until 1953. Jim Steranko has observed, "where Cuidera made Blackhawk a best-seller, Crandall turned it into a classic, a work of major importance and lasting value". It was during Crandall's run that the series hit its sales and popularity zenith.

The Blackhawks' success earned them their own title in Winter 1944. That issue, Blackhawk #9, picked up the numbering of Quality's canceled Uncle Sam Quarterly. They meanwhile continued to be featured prominently in Military Comics, later renamed Modern Comics, until that book's cancellation with #102 (October 1950).

During the Quality years, a whole host of well-respected talent worked on the character, including writers Manly Wade Wellman, Bill Woolfolk, Bill Finger, and Dick French, as well as artists Al Bryant, Bill Ward, and Dick Dillin. French, a songwriter, provided the inspiration for the team singing from their cockpits.

Quality Comics ceased operations with comics cover-dated December 1956, with Blackhawk #107 being the final issue published by Quality. The character and title trademarks were initially leased on a royalty basis to National Periodical Publications (now DC Comics) before eventually being sold in their entirety.

=== Acquired by DC Comics ===
Blackhawk was one of the few Quality series that DC chose to keep running uninterrupted. Penciller Dick Dillin and inker Chuck Cuidera remained on the title, ensuring a near-seamless transition. The duo would stay with the title through nearly its entire first run at DC.

Steering deeper and deeper into the realm of science fiction, the Blackhawks found themselves confronting a steady stream of mostly one-off supervillain-like adversaries bent on world domination.

The Blackhawks also gained a new ally in Blackhawk #133 (February 1959): Lady Blackhawk, a pilot named Zinda Blake who was determined to become the first female member of the team. After a couple of appearances, she was granted honorary status and became a semi-frequent member of the supporting cast.

In an effort to update the characters, DC gave the team its first ever major wardrobe overhaul in Blackhawk #197 (June 1964), replacing their longtime uniforms with red and black shirts and green pants. On a dramatic level, Lady Blackhawk was transformed into a supervillain, Queen Killer Shark, in Blackhawk #200 (September 1964).

Then, in a much more drastic attempt to combat flagging sales due to the rising popularity of superhero books and the Batman TV series, DC proclaimed with Blackhawk #228 (January 1967) the beginning of "the New Blackhawk Era" with a cover featuring Justice League of America members Superman, Batman, Green Lantern, and the Flash observing that the Blackhawks are (in Superman's words) "washed up" and (in Batman's words) "junk-heap heroes". In the issues that followed, all but Blackhawk gained a costumed superhero alter ego at the behest of a shadowy government agency.

With sales continuing to sink, the Blackhawks were restored to something that more closely resembled their original roots in Blackhawk #242 (August 1968), losing the superhero identities in favor of their traditional blue and black uniforms. It was too late though; the comic was canceled for the first time one issue later.

=== 1970s ===
Just over seven years later, DC Comics resurrected the series with Blackhawk #244 (January 1976) as part of an ongoing mid-1970s expansion of the line dubbed "Conway's Corner" in house ads. The Blackhawks were transplanted to the 1970s and now portrayed as mercenaries-for-hire, matching wits against fancifully bizarre new villains, as well as a re-imagined Killer Shark and War Wheel. This run ended with Blackhawk #250 (January 1977).

=== 1980s–1990s ===
Amid rampant rumors that Steven Spielberg was interested in Blackhawk as a possible film project, DC Comics once again resumed the series. Initially conceived as being published quarterly, editor Len Wein convinced DC to make the book monthly and eventually assembled a team that included writer Mark Evanier and artist Dan Spiegle. Blackhawk #251 (October 1982) returned the team to a World War II setting and restored many of the familiar trappings that had been shed over the years during the various attempts to modernize the characters. Numerous new supporting characters were introduced during the run, most notably Domino, a buxom Nazi assassin and love interest to Blackhawk who was reminiscent of the femmes fatales so common during the Quality Comics era. Evanier also reintroduced arch-villain Killer Shark, and has said he would have likely added Lady Blackhawk to the cast had the series lasted longer. But faced with stagnant sales that Evanier attributed largely to DC's lack of interest in publicizing the series, the book was canceled with Blackhawk #273 (November 1984). Though it wouldn't be known at the time, that issue would mark the definitive end of the series' original issue numbering.

Sometime after the cancellation, DC employed writer Bill DuBay and artist Carmine Infantino to produce a Blackhawk mini-series. Though never published, numerous finished pages exist.

In 1988, a three-issue mini-series by Howard Chaykin re-imagined the team during World War II yet again, this time with a notably more adult and gritty take on the characters. Chaykin, for the most part, eschewed the team dynamic so familiar to Blackhawk readers, instead crafting a politically charged espionage thriller that focused prominently on Blackhawk and a new version of Lady Blackhawk. Post-war stories respecting Chaykin's continuity followed in Action Comics Weekly #601–608, #615–622, and #628–635, as well as in a monthly series that restarted with an issue #1 and ran 16 issues from March 1989 to August 1990.

In 1992, DC Comics published Blackhawk Special #1. Still respecting Chaykin's continuity and set 10 years after the events of Blackhawk #16, the story spans a five-year period as Blackhawk seeks to avenge the death of team member André.

=== More recent appearances ===
Since 1992, mostly modern hints of the team have appeared, usually in the form of the "Blackhawk Express" courier service or the time-displaced Lady Blackhawk. One of the best examples of this is the 1990s appearance of team member Chop-Chop in a few issues of DC's Hawkworld series.

Other Blackhawk air pilot groups have been shown during present time or alternate future events such as Our Worlds At War and Kingdom Come. It is unknown which connection beyond homage and inspiration, if any, those groups have to the classic Blackhawks. Blackhawk at this time is an extension of Checkmate.

DC Comics reprinted the Blackhawk features from the first 17 issues of Military Comics in The Blackhawk Archives Volume 1 (2001) as part of its hardcover DC Archive Editions series.

Blackhawk made an appearance in The Brave and the Bold (Vol. 3) #9 (February 2008), teaming up with the Boy Commandos during a World War II tale.

The Blackhawks appeared in Superman & Batman: Generations 2, in which they help Superman, Spectre, and Hawkman battle a robot during the war. During the battle, Chuck sacrifices himself to destroy a missile. During the same storyline in 1997, a heroine named Blackhawk appears, battling Sinestro. According to John Byrne's liner notes in Generations 3 #1, this character is Janet Hall, the granddaughter of the original Blackhawk, as well as Hawkman (Carter Hall) and Hawkgirl (Shiera Sanders).

=== The New 52 ===
In September 2011 as part of its New 52 publishing revamp, DC Comics launched a monthly series titled Blackhawks with no direct ties to the previous incarnations. The book is set in the present day with no appearances by, or mention of, prior Blackhawks, although there is a new version of the Lady Blackhawk character. The book shares the setting of the rebooted DC Universe continuity set up in the Flashpoint mini-series. The series ended with Blackhawks #8 (April 2012) to make way for a "second wave" of New 52 titles.

== Fictional team history ==
=== Original incarnation ===
Blackhawk #12 (Autumn 1946), cover art by Al Bryant.

"History has proven that whenever liberty is smothered and men lie crushed beneath oppression; there always rises a man to defend the helpless...liberate the enslaved and crush the tyrant...Such a man is Blackhawk...Out of the ruins of Europe and out of the hopeless mass of defeated people he comes, smashing the evil before him..."

— Introduction from Military Comics #1 (August 1941)

With the overwhelming forces of Nazi Germany flooding into Poland in September, 1939, only the Polish Air Force remains as the last major line of resistance. Captain von Tepp and his Butcher Squadron swarm the skies in response, outnumbering the Polish four to one. The Germans decimate their foes until just one lone plane — painted jet black — remains. After gallantly shooting down six Nazi planes, the mysterious pilot is forced to crash land on the countryside. Running to a nearby farmhouse, he is tracked from the air by von Tepp, who drops a bomb and destroys the building. The pilot locates his dead sister and mortally wounded brother inside. He vows to kill von Tepp before disappearing into the darkness.

Months later, with most of Europe collapsing under the might of the Nazis, the pilot reemerges with his own private squadron and "like an angel of vengeance, Blackhawk and his men swoop down out of nowhere, their guns belching death, and on their lips the dreaded song of the Blackhawks".

In France, Captain von Tepp receives a note from Blackhawk demanding the release of one of Blackhawk's men or face death. Infuriated, von Tepp orders the prisoner's execution by firing squad. At dawn, the man and two others, including a cool-headed English Red Cross nurse (identified as "Ann" in Military Comics #3), are lined against a wall and mocked by von Tepp. As his men prepare to fire, the song of the Blackhawks fills the air:

Over land, over sea,
We fight to make men free,
Of danger we don't care...
We're Blackhawks!

With the Blackhawks lining the walls of the courtyard, Blackhawk himself confronts von Tepp. After a brief skirmish, von Tepp is abducted and flown to the Blackhawks' secret base in the Atlantic Ocean, Blackhawk Island. There, Blackhawk challenges von Tepp to an aerial duel. During the ensuring dogfight, both of the men's planes are crippled and forced to crash. On the ground, von Tepp and Blackhawk, both badly injured, draw guns. Von Tepp falls in a hail of bullets.

Blackhawk's team is mostly depicted in Military Comics #1 as shadowy, nondescript soldiers, save for an Englishman named Baker who is never seen or mentioned again. Military Comics #2 (September 1941) expands the role of the team in the featured adventure and introduces five members: Stanislaus, André, Olaf, Hendrick (Hendrickson within a few issues), and Zeg. A sixth, Boris, is also shown, but, like Baker, only makes a single appearance. The designer of their planes, Vladim, is also mentioned.

By Military Comics #3 (October 1941), the roster is firmed up and it is stated that seven men are in the team. The group also receives a Chinese mascot and cook, Chop-Chop, when his plane happens to crash on Blackhawk Island during a desperate run for help. The adventure concludes with the first on-page death of a team member: André, who seemingly perishes in an avalanche that buries a large group of Nazis. In Military Comics #9 (April 1942), the roster is down to five plus Chop-Chop, with Zeg presumably the absent member. In that adventure, the team crosses paths with the mysterious Man in the Iron Mask, who is revealed to be a disfigured André.

The most familiar version of the team is finally locked down in Military Comics #11 (August 1942) shown as consisting of Blackhawk, Olaf, Chuck, André (his face now reconstructed), Stanislaus, Hendrickson, and Chop-Chop.

In Blackhawk #50 (March 1952), the team's origin is documented. Blackhawk himself is no longer identified as being Polish, but rather a Polish-American who is a volunteer flyer in the Polish Air Force. His sidekick in the squadron is Stanislaus, a "brilliant young student" from the University of Warsaw. After facing defeat against the Nazis, Blackhawk attempts to flee to Russia, only to discover that Russian forces are invading from the east. He then seeks refuge in England where he attempts to join the Royal Air Force. In London, Blackhawk and Stanislaus reunite and then meet the four others who will ultimately join them in their crusade: Chuck, another American volunteer; Hendrickson, a recent escapee from a Nazi concentration camp; Olaf, a Swede who had fought for Finland against the Russians; and André, a "valiant Frenchman". The six men wait to enlist in the R.A.F., but because none are British subjects, they are "held up by miles of red tape". Finally, Blackhawk suggests they strike out on their own. They pool their resources and buy planes, setting up a base of operations first on a small island in the Atlantic Ocean, then later in the Pacific. They're eventually joined by Chop-Chop, described in this account as having "fled from China when the Japanese overpowered the Nationalist army". Chop-Chop first acts as the team's cook, but in time becomes an expert pilot and full member of the team.

=== Post-Crisis ===
After the Crisis on Infinite Earths, Blackhawk is once again Polish by birth and now given a definitive name, Janos Prohaska. Having joined the Polish Air Force at a young age, he had already become a national hero by 1936 alongside his trusted friends Stanislaus Drozdowski and Kazimierc "Zeg" Zegota-Januszajtis. Prior to the outbreak of World War II, the trio travel across Europe, providing freelance service and even fighting for a time in the Spanish Civil War as members of the Communist party.

At one point finding himself in America in hopes of gathering funds to build a European resistance group, Prohaska is framed for a series of murders. With the help of the Sandman, he is ultimately exonerated, but a report soon surfaces that he has been shot down and killed by Nazis somewhere in the Mediterranean.

When the forces of Nazi Germany invade Poland in 1939, Prohaska returns home to help defend his homeland. He is unable to save his younger siblings, Józek and Staszka, and soon forced to flee to Britain with Stanislaus and Zeg. There, he meets the others who will form the foundation of the Blackhawk Squadron.

In the midst of the war, Prohaska finds himself under suspicion by the U.S. government for his Communist ties. Around this same time, the Blackhawks are joined by Captain Natalie Reed (born Natalie Gurdin), a brilliant Russian-American flight engineer who redesigns the Blackhawks' aircraft and is dubbed Lady Blackhawk by the U.S. press. With her help, Prohaska stops Nazi agent and onetime Hollywood actor Death Mayhew from detonating an atomic bomb in New York City. The victory restores Blackhawk's reputation.

=== The New 52 ===
In 2011, the entire line of DC Comics was rebooted as part of "The New 52". In this new version the Blackhawks are an elite covert military unit taking care of high technology criminals. During this period their main mission was to deal with terrorist group "Mother Machine". During this storyline their cover is exposed and their existence becomes known to the public and the team must deal with the backlash as well.

=== Rebirth ===
In Dark Nights: Metal #1, Kendra Saunders is introduced as Lady Blackhawk. She is now the leader of the Blackhawks, an anti-apocalyptic team with the mission to prevent the Dark Multiverse from destroying Earth-0. She also introduces the Blackhawk Island, a place where cosmic energy conducted through the earth's metal core cancels itself out, creating a kind of static that disrupts space-time. The Island served as well for many years as a base of operations for Hawkman and Hawkgirl.

Lady Blackhawk and the Blackhawks are featured in All-Star Batman second arc, "Ends of Earth". They are seen hounding Batman, and they are shown to possesses an armor that has the ability to track eye-line movement. The armor also turns them invisible.

== List of team members ==
=== Original incarnation ===
After a period of membership fluctuations during the first 10 issues of Military Comics, the team finally settles into its most famous roster. Although minor character details would shift and change over time, this original version of the team would stay largely intact from the characters' debut in 1941 to the end of their first run in 1968. At one point or another, every member of the team except Blackhawk is depicted in ways stereotypical for the time, and over the course of the series several would develop their own catchphrases.

==== Blackhawk (Bart Hawk) ====
Originally Polish and then American, the man known as Blackhawk is portrayed as a strong, decisive leader. He is not always easy on his men—calling Olaf a "big fat-head", for example—but always appears to command their unquestionable respect. At one point late in the first series' run, he is given a name, Bart Hawk.

==== Lady Blackhawk (Zinda Blake) ====
The strip's most significant supporting character is Zinda Blake, also known as Lady Blackhawk. After a failed attempt to become the team's first female member, she is eventually awarded honorary status and makes numerous appears from 1959 to 1968, even becoming the villainess Queen Killer Shark for a time.

==== Other team members ====
Name	Description and characterization
Stanislaus	Blackhawk's second-in-command. Polish, Stan is initially depicted like his teammates with various ethnic distinctions, but those disappear as the series progresses to the point that he could very well pass for an American. He is often portrayed as an acrobat, then later as the team's strongman.
Chuck	At different times stated as being from Brooklyn or Texas, Chuck is often shown as the team's communications specialist. His often uses American colloquialisms like "I reckon!" and "Dagnabbit!"
Hendrickson	Known as "Hendy" for short, he is the oldest of the Blackhawks and their sharpshooter. Heavyset with white hair and a thick, Germanic mustache, he is usually portrayed as Dutch (though German in some accounts), and often exclaims, "Himmel!" (German for "sky" and "heaven") or "Ach du lieber!" (a German phrase akin to "Oh, dear!").
André	The team's demolition expert, he is characterized as having a pencil-thin mustache, naturally suave. His frequent infatuation for beautiful women has occasionally created precarious situations in some stories.
Olaf	A large and brutish man, Olaf is usually portrayed as Swedish and has and poor English, playing into the "big, dumb Swede" stereotype. He often shouts, "Py Yiminy!" and demonstrates impressive acrobatic abilities (a trait that Stanislaus' character loses over time).
Liu Huang (Chop Chop)	Originally the team's Chinese cook and informally Blackhawk's sidekick who rode alongside his plane as opposed to his own, he evolved from comic relief to a serious character valued for his martial artistry. The character was first named "Chop-Chop" but his name was retroactively revealed later.
Other short-term members are Baker, an Englishman, and Boris, a Russian. Both characters only make single panel appearances. Zeg, Polish like Blackhawk and Stanislaus, manages to last a bit longer, but is gone by the Blackhawk's ninth appearance in Military Comics. The team acquires an animal mascot in the 1950s, Blackie the hawk. Possessing remarkable intelligence he can type notes in plain English, among other skills and fitted with his own miniature belt radio, he is often shown perched on Blackhawk's shoulder.

==== Miss Fear ====
First appearance of Miss Fear, Modern Comics #49 (May, 1946), Quality Comics.

Miss Fear (or simply, Fear) was a recurring character in Blackhawk comics (published by Quality Comics, later bought by DC Comics) between 1946 and 1948. Her first appearance in Modern Comics #49 (May, 1946) told her origin as daughter of the slain leader of an obscure nation called Zorania. When Blackhawk and his men arrived to investigate the murder, they found Fear always a half-step ahead on her vendetta, ruthlessly avenging her father with a Tommy gun. Within her appearance in Golden Age stories, she developed a distinctly romantic yet seemingly unrequited interest in Blackhawk, meanwhile involving and assisting the team in various cases and missions, usually in central Asia. Fear displayed an impressive array of skills including flying, horsemanship, martial arts, and wielding a bullwhip, as well as crack marksmanship. The conclusion of the final story, however, seemed to imply that she was resigned to disappointment in carrying a torch for Blackhawk. In 1998, Miss Fear returned in a somewhat different form in the four-issue miniseries Guns of the Dragon, by Timothy Truman, starring Enemy Ace and Bat Lash. Set in China, 1927, this story depicted her as a young, half-Chinese / half-Caucasian spy in service of the communists. The plot also involved a recurring Blackhawk villain, the Thunderer, as well as a brief appearance by Chop-Chop, although his age at that point seems impossible to reconcile with his later career as Blackhawk's sidekick. The outcome of the adventure led Fear to reconsider her loyalty to the communists and suggested her future as a freelance freedom-fighter.

However, her only subsequent appearance thus far has been in the form of a limited edition 1/6 scale G.I. Joe action figure, produced by Dreams & Visions in 2003, licensed by Hasbro and DC Comics.

=== 1967's New Blackhawk Era ===
"It's fact, sir – the Blackhawks are washed-up has-beens, out of date antiques, a danger to national security! To put it bluntly... they just don't swing!"

— Batman to the U.S. President in Blackhawk #228 (January 1967)

Blackhawk #230 (March 1967): The Blackhawks adopt alter-egos, art by Dick Dillin.

When the Blackhawks are proven by the secret spy organization G.E.O.R.G.E. (the Group for Extermination of Organizations of Revenge, Greed, and Evil) to be inept and ineffective as a modern-day fighting force against the evils of the world, the team regroups and dons dramatic new identities that, as the U.S. president happily observes, returns them to their rightful place as one of America's "top trouble-shooting teams". For 14 issues beginning with Blackhawk #228 (January 1967), the Blackhawks become:

- The Big Eye (Blackhawk) – Constantly monitoring the activities of his squad from the Hawk-Kite, a mammoth dirigible made to look like a two-headed hawk, Blackhawk is the only one of the seven to not take on a new alter-ego.
- The Golden Centurion (Stanislaus) – Clad in the gleaming gold armor of a dead foe, Stan not only gains the ability to fly, but can also fire bolts of "ionized pure gold".
- The Listener (Chuck) – Chuck facilitates communication between the team, wearing what resembles pajamas covered with drawings of ears.
- The Weapons-Master (Hendrickson) – Hendy is the team's master of weaponry.
- M'sieu Machine (André) – André becomes designer of exotic crime-fighting gadgets.
- The Leaper (Olaf) – Donning a rubber-titanium outfit reminiscent of a human cannonball circus performer, Olaf's natural acrobatic abilities are now complemented with the ability to leap and bounce great distances.
- Dr. Hands (Chop-Chop) – Mixing martial arts with beryllium-encased hands, Chop-Chop is able to "smash through practically anything".

The change was very unpopular; in the span of a year, the series lost an average 71,000 readers per issue. The "New Blackhawk Era" ends after just 14 issues when G.E.O.R.G.E. headquarters is unceremoniously destroyed, leaving the Blackhawks with only their classic blue and black uniforms.

=== 1976–1977 ===
When the series resumes in 1976, it features a mercenary team composed of familiar unaged faces. Their origins and place in the DC Universe are never explained, though it is firmly stated that this version of the Blackhawks consists of "the original seven" and surmises that they had "first banded together in the fifties to battle a growing number of costumed villains and foes". The members of the team are described as follows:

- Blackhawk (also referred to as "Bart Hawk" and "Mr. Cunningham") – The head of one of the largest aircraft manufacturing companies in the world, and a man who commands "a working knowledge of science with specialties in aviation and aerodynamics".
- Stanislaus – The Polish "financial wizard" of Cunningham Aircraft.
- André – The French mechanics expert.
- Olaf – The Swedish junior member of the group.
- Hendrickson – The Dutch elder of the group and the full-time "sentinel" of the team's secret base, Blackhawk Island.
- Chuck – The American communications expert and team scientist.
- Chopper (formerly known as Chop-Chop) – The Chinese master of martial arts and the team's most skilled flier, "save for Blackhawk himself".

Early in the run, Boris - "the eighth Blackhawk", as he refers to himself - reemerges as the super-powered villain Anti-Man, hellbent on destroying the team as revenge for leaving him for dead on a long ago mission. Shown in flashback wearing the Blackhawks' classic blue and black uniform, even then as a member he exhibits surprising aggression toward his teammates.

With Hendrickson left ailing in the final issue of the run, and Chuck seemingly killed in battle, it is possible that big changes were in store for the team's line-up had the series continued past Blackhawk #250. Two possible replacements are set up, either of whom could have also taken the mantle of Lady Blackhawk: Duchess Ramona Fatale (also referred to as "Patch"), a mercenary with questionable allegiances, but harboring love for Blackhawk; and Elsa, Hendrickson's daughter.

=== 1982–1984 ===
With the team's return to a World War II setting, many basic aspects of the original incarnation are restored, complemented by what writer Mark Evanier called "a more contemporary attitude towards characterization". The core members are:

- Blackhawk – Described as "Polish American" and referred to as Bart on a few occasions. He abhors killing, doing so only in self-defense. He is strong and level-headed, not always reacting as swiftly or as violently as some of his men might like.
- Stanislaus – Blackhawk's Polish second-in-command and loyal friend. Lacking confidence from being in Blackhawk's shadow for so long, he envies Blackhawk's strong leadership capabilities.
- André – A former member of the French resistance, he is the team's experienced military planner and full-time ladies' man.
- Olaf – A Swede whose tall height and thick accent plays into a common stereotype, but in actuality conceals amazing acrobatic skills and a savvy mind in combat.
- Hendrickson – The team's Dutch weapons master and sharpshooter. The oldest of the group, he grapples with feelings of resentment, often left feeling like his much-younger teammates do not always make full use of his wisdom.
- Chuck – A Texan who volunteered for the British R.A.F. before bringing his expert piloting and mechanic skills to the Blackhawks. He is portrayed as tougher and more rude than previous depictions.
- Chop-Chop – Both the youngest and the newest member of the team, he is a martial arts master named Wu Cheng.

Also introduced during the run is Lieutenant Theodore Gaynor of the United States Marine Corps, who joins the team when Chop-Chop takes a leave of absence to fight the Japanese in China. Gaynor leaves the team after it is learned his hardline stance against the Germans includes the execution of not only Nazi soldiers, but also civilians.

=== 1988–present ===
After the Crisis on Infinite Earths rewrites the history of the DC Universe, the Blackhawks' own history, both during World War II and after, undergoes yet more transformation. The members are:

- Major Janos Prohaska (Blackhawk) – Reestablished as being born and raised in Poland, Prohaska is portrayed as the consummate leader, but also as a brash, hard-drinking womanizer. He is also revealed to have been a member of the Communist Party, expelled by Joseph Stalin after opposing the Molotov–Ribbentrop Pact, a 1939 treaty of non-aggression between the Soviets and Nazi Germany.
- Captain Stanislaus Drozdowski – Longtime friend of Blackhawk's who fights alongside him in the Polish Air Force before becoming one of the earliest members of the Blackhawks—and one of the team's first casualties.
- Captain André Blanc-Dumont – An excellent but slightly reckless pilot, the Frenchman is second-in-command of the team, as well as Prohaska's closest confidant and frequent co-pilot.
- Captain Olaf Friedriksen – Danish in this version, athletic Olaf is a savant with languages and skilled at radio operations.
- Captain Ritter Hendricksen – The Dutch marksmen and demolitions expert, as well as the oldest member of the team.
- Captain Carlo "Chuck" Sirianni – An Italian-American from New Jersey who served with the U.S. Office of Strategic Services before joining the team and becoming their chief navigation officer. Chuck is also a dabbler in electronics and aeronautic technology.
- Lieutenant Weng Chan (Chop-Chop) – Chinese and said to be just 17 when he first joins the team, Weng is a skilled pilot, flight mechanic, and cook.
- Captain Natalie Reed (Lady Blackhawk) – Brilliant Russian-American flight engineer who redesigns the Blackhawks' aircraft and fights alongside them. She gives birth to a son in 1945, the product of a brief affair with Hendricksen.

Other early members of the team include Russians Boris Zinoviev and Kazimierc "Zeg" Zegota-Januszajtis, and Englishman Ian Holcomb-Baker, who are "the first to fall in battle". Later team members include African-American Grover Baines, Malaysian Quan Chee Keng (known as "Mairzey"), and Mexican Paco Herrera.

=== 2011–present ===
Core members of the Blackhawk Squadron as depicted in the New 52 era:

- Colonel Andrew Lincoln – Deputy of operations.
- Lady Blackhawk
- Kunoichi – Nikki Nemzer, Japanese field operative.
- The Irishman – Ukrainian field operative.
- Attila – Hungarian field operative.
- Canada
- Wildman – Randall Wildman, Field support operative.

== Evolution of Chop-Chop ==
The longtime depiction of Chop-Chop, with art by Reed Crandall. The version portrayed here in 1943 played on racist stereotypes against East Asians, particularly during World War II.

In the 1940s and 1950s, Chop-Chop provides comic relief in the Blackhawk strip and is depicted as more of a highly exaggerative caricature amid the realistic art style that otherwise surrounds him. Fat, buck-toothed, and orange-skinned, he speaks in broken English, wears a queue hairstyle complete with a bow, and dresses in colorful coolie garb. This depiction, although now considered offensive, was not atypical of World War II-era depictions of Asians, especially the Japanese. A popular character at the time, Chop-Chop appeared in his own humor feature in the Blackhawk series from 1946 to 1955.

Even in his very earliest appearances, he demonstrates tremendous competency and bravery, arriving on Blackhawk Island in a plane of his own construction, and then, relatively soon after, is shown fighting right alongside Blackhawk in a hand-to-hand melee. Despite this, he is long portrayed as essentially Blackhawk's sidekick, riding along in Blackhawk's plane as opposed to piloting his own and often brandishing a cleaver in battle.

In 1952, it is firmly stated that Chop-Chop is a full member of the team, and from 1955 to 1964, he becomes a more realistically drawn character, changes that culminate when the Blackhawks take on a major uniform change for the first time in their history and Chop-Chop finally joins them in his choice of wardrobe. When the team later reverts to their traditional blue and black uniforms, he dons one for the first time.

When the 1980s World War II-set revival of the series begins, Chop-Chop is again shown in a variation of his original outfit (and even clutches a cleaver on the cover of the first issue). Most significantly, then current writer gave the character a proper name: Wu Cheng. It is apparent, however, that the similarities end there and that he is far from comic relief. As the run progresses, it is revealed that he feels slighted by his teammates, not given proper enough respect to even wear the same uniform as them. Realizing their embarrassing oversight, they bestow to him with great ceremony a standard uniform and his own plane to mark him as a respected member of the group.

After DC Comics' company-wide crossover event Crisis on Infinite Earths revamped and streamlined many of DC's properties, Chop-Chop has almost exclusively been depicted with a build similar to his comrades and wearing the Blackhawks' standard uniform. His past likeness and role as sidekick is addressed, shown as a character in a comic book about the Blackhawks, which he finds infuriatingly insulting.

Chop-Chop is given a proper name and uniform; art by Dan Spiegle.

=== 1983 controversy ===
In Blackhawk #263 (October 1983), writer Mark Evanier took over the "Blackhawk Bylines" letter column to address an anonymous editorial written by a staff member of the Richmond Times-Dispatch that ran in the paper's February 6, 1983, edition. Evanier wrote of the piece:

He (let's assume it's a He) complains: "No longer does the Oriental Blackhawk bang no-goodniks on the head with manhole covers, exclaiming: 'Chop-Chop fixee so face look difflunt!'" The writer loves this kind of stuff and then goes on to explain that to not depict Chop-Chop in this manner is the real insult. He writes: "Since Chop-Chop turned up full-grown in 1941, he might well have been born into a village in which the customs of Imperial China still lingered". Referring to the fact that Chop-Chop no longer sports the ponytail: "Dequeueing him demonstrates not 'tolerance' but cultural imperialism...to the extent that a working class Chinese spoke English, it would be pidgin, not the queen's..." Translation: The fat, stupid version was historically accurate".

An admittedly stunned Evanier denounced the column, challenging the editorial writer's assertion that Steven Spielberg, at the time rumored to be interested in making a Blackhawk film, should be faithful to the original depiction of Chop-Chop. Evanier wrote that it was amazing to him that "anyone could believe that Chinese folks were really obese and stupid in the forties" or that Spielberg would ignore the box office and "commit professional suicide by so depicting them".

When asked later if the editorial hastened Evanier's own approach to evolving the character, Evanier said he thought he would have pursued the same course regardless, giving the editorial "probably more attention than it deserved".

== Aircraft ==
=== Grumman XF5F Skyrocket ===
The Grumman XF5F Skyrocket is the twin-engine fighter most identified with the Blackhawks. The team is nearly always shown flying modified versions of the plane during their World War II adventures and for some time thereafter. As Will Eisner remembered:

So we came up with the idea of using a certain model Grumman airplane, which had a very strange configuration. It had tailfins coming out from under a wing. It also apparently had the capacity to make a rapid takeoff from the deck of an aircraft carrier. It was a Navy plane, as I remember, not an Army Air Force plane. Actually, in real life, it turned out not to be as good a plane as everybody thought it would be, but it sure looked sexy!

=== Other notable aircraft ===
Additionally, other planes made appearances during the course of strip:

- PZL.50A Jastrząb – This is the plane that Blackhawk flew in Poland during the Nazi invasion of 1939.
- Republic F-84 Thunderjet – By the early 1950s, the Blackhawks converted the squadron to jets. This was the Blackhawk Squadron's first jet aircraft:
- Lockheed XF-90 – This actual experimental fighter was adapted to become the fictional:

F-90 "B" – The Blackhawks flew this plane from 1950 to 1955.
F-90 "C" – The Blackhawks were flying this model by 1957.

- Republic F-105 Thunderchief – The Blackhawks modified this plane to have VTOL capability.
- Lockheed F-94 Starfire – This is the plane that Lady Blackhawk flew.

== International incarnations ==
The Blackhawk concept and characters proved to be popular on the international market as well as in the United States. Quality Comics licensed the rights along with many of their other characters to London's Boardman Books, which used them in a series of three-color reprints from 1948 to 1954. Boardman also reprinted Blackhawk stories in their Adventure Annual series of hardcover Christmas publications. Many of the British Blackhawk reprints were repackaged by Boardman art director Denis McLoughlin, who created at least one British original Blackhawk story, as well as the illustrations for several Blackhawk text stories. After Boardman's contract lapsed, Strato Publications launched a square-bound 68-page Blackhawk series which ran for 37 issues between 1956 and 1958.

== Early crossover ==
In Hit Comics #26 (February 1943), Blackhawk participated in an early example of a crossover when fellow Quality Comics character Kid Eternity summons him to stop a mad scientist.

== Other versions ==
=== Flashpoint ===
- In the Flashpoint reality, the Blackhawk Squadron, equipped with F-35s and with Hal Jordan and Carol Ferris among its pilots, respond to attacks on New Themyscira, but are killed by Amazonian forces.

== In other media ==
=== Television ===
Blackhawk as he appears in Justice League.

- A 1968 "presentation drawing" from Filmation depicts a red-shirted interpretation of Blackhawk and a member of the squadron fighting a group of aliens. Created during the height of The Superman/Aquaman Hour of Adventure's popularity, the artwork is believed to have been part of an attempt to convince CBS of the animation viability of other DC Comics properties.
- The Blackhawk squadron appear in series set in the DC Animated Universe (DCAU):
  - The Blackhawks appear in the Justice League three-part episode "The Savage Time", with the unidentified leader voiced by Robert Picardo. They join forces with Steve Trevor, the Easy Company, and the time-traveling Justice League to thwart Vandal Savage's plot to help Nazi Germany win WWII and eventually conquer the world.
  - An elderly Chuck appears in the Justice League Unlimited episode "I Am Legion", voiced by Seymour Cassel. As of the present, he is the last living Blackhawk and married Mairzey sometime prior. The Secret Society attack the decommissioned Blackhawk Island to steal the Blackhawks' technology, but only succeed in stealing the Spear of Longinus before being repelled by Chuck and the Justice League.
- A contemporary private security company called the Blackhawk Squad Protection Group appears in the Arrow episode "Trust But Verify", with Theodore Gaynor (portrayed by Ben Browder), Paul Knox (Colin Lawrence), Cavanaugh (Jae Lee), and Blake (portrayed by an uncredited actor) as prominent employees. Gaynor was John Diggle's former commanding officer in Afghanistan before turning to crime. While leading a group of Blackhawk employees in raiding armored cars, Gaynor is eventually killed by Oliver Queen.

=== Film ===
- Blackhawk appears in a self-titled serial, portrayed by Kirk Alyn.
- The Blackhawk squadron appears in Justice League: The New Frontier.
- In the early 1980s, Steven Spielberg announced plans to direct a film adaptation of the Blackhawk comic book series, with Dan Aykroyd attached to play the title character. However, the project was canceled and Spielberg chose to direct Raiders of the Lost Ark instead. In April 2018, Warner Bros. Pictures revived the Blackhawk project, with Spielberg returning to direct and produce and David Koepp writing the screenplay. Additionally, Spielberg would co-produce the film with Kristie Macosko Krieger and Sue Kroll and it was initially expected to begin after he completed West Side Story. Koepp later added that he is now working on the script, but is unsure if Spielberg will direct. In March 2022, Koepp confirmed that a script had been written, though he suggested Spielberg's involvement in the project was currently unknown due to other commitments. He also confirmed there were no plans for the film to be part of the DC Extended Universe (DCEU).
- Blackhawk makes a non-speaking appearance in Justice League: Crisis on Infinite Earths.

=== Miscellaneous ===
- Blackhawk appears in a self-titled radio series, voiced by Michael Fitzmaurice.
- A Blackhawk squadron-esque group called the Skysharks appear in Alan Moore's Top 10: The Forty-Niners.
- The Blackhawk squadron appear in the novel Blackhawk, by William Rotsler.

=== Merchandise ===
- A limited-edition Blackhawk G.I. Joe action figure was produced in 2002 by Dreams & Visions and licensed by DC Comics and Hasbro. The figure comes with the blue-black flight uniform from World War II, Blackhawk's red and green uniform from the mid to late 1960s, and a sky blue Arctic survival uniform.
- In July 2006, DC Direct released a 6.58" Blackhawk action figure in series 1 of the DC: The New Frontier toyline.
- In 2008, figures of Blackhawk, Stanislaus, and Hendrickson were released for HeroClix.
- In 2009, Mattel released a Blackhawk figure as part of their Justice League Unlimited toyline.

== Magazine parodies ==
- MAD magazine featured a parody of Blackhawks called "Black and Blue Hawks".
- National Lampoon produced a parody titled "Whitedove", in which the heroes are inspectors from UNESCO.

== Enemies ==
- Black Mask was Blackhawk's younger brother, Jack Hawk, who believed his brother had betrayed him. Jack first appeared as Black Mask in Blackhawk #242 (August–September 1968).
- Black Star was a female criminal who died in an encounter with the Blackhawks. She only appeared once, in Modern Comics #101 (September 1950).
- Killer Shark regularly confronted the Blackhawks with his fantastic weaponry. His first battle with the Blackhawks was in Blackhawk #50 (March 1952).
- Queen Killer Shark was actually Zinda Blake a.k.a. Lady Blackhawk, who was brainwashed by Killer Shark into believing the Blackhawks were her enemies. Zinda first became Queen Killer Shark in Blackhawk #200 (September 1964).

== See also ==
- PZL.37 Łoś bomber
- PZL P.11 fighter
- No. 303 Polish Fighter Squadron
- The history of the Polish Air Force
- Polish contribution to World War II
- Seven Soldiers of Victory
- List of film serials
