= Noel Mills (actress) =

American actress (1917–2002)

Jacqueline Isobel Noel Mills (October 22, 1917 – June 25, 2002) was an American actress who was active in films, on radio, and on stage.

== Early years ==
Jacqueline Isobel Noel Mills was born in Haslemere, England on October 22, 1917. Five years later, she and her family moved to Canada. She began ballet at age 3. Her early acting experience came in little theaters in the Montreal area, performing in French and in English. During her teenage years she traveled with stock theater companies. She became an American citizen.

== Career ==
Mills's radio debut came in St. Louis in 1934. She later announced and acted on radio station WLS in Chicago. She left there and went to New York, where she had "four pretty tough years, working in local stations and playing bit parts". Her performance in a play on The Kate Smith Hour radio show caught the attention of writer Elaine Sterne Carrington, and resulted in Mills being cast in Carrington's new soap opera, When a Girl Marries on which she portrayed Joan Field. She also was heard on The Court of Missing Heirs, Your Family and Mine, The Baby Snooks Show and Gang Busters.

Mills appeared in the film Madame Curie, and she was a fashion commentator for Pathé News. Her work on television included performances on Hawkins Falls, Population 6200 and NBC Television Theatre.

In 1946 Mills was a civilian actress technician with Army Special Services in the South Pacific.

== Personal life and death ==
Mills married Stanley Johnson Worth in Manhattan, New York, in 1940. She later married comedian Tommy Riggs in Easton, Pennsylvania, on June 9, 1948.

Mills died in Myrtle Beach, South Carolina on June 25, 2002, at the age of 84.
