= Marion Barney =

American actress (1879–1968)

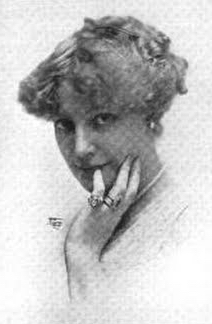
Marion Barney, from a 1914 publication.

Marion Barney (1879 - 1968) was an American character actress active on the stage and in radio and silent films. A native of San Francisco, she began her career as an actress at the age of 18 while studying at the University of California, Berkeley. In her early career she performed professionally in California with theatre troupes led by Harry Corson Clarke and T. Daniel Frawley. In 1901 she toured the United States in E. H. Sothern's theatre troupe which brought her to New York City and Philadelphia theaters for the first time. In the early 1900s she performed both in touring shows and on Broadway before working as a resident actress at the Chestnut Street Theatre in Philadelphia from 1908-1913. She was subsequently active as an actress on Broadway into the early 1930s.

On screen, Barney made a few silent films in 1913, but otherwise was not active in pictures again until making several more films released between the years 1918-1921. In the 1930s her work shifted into radio. In her later career she was known for her long association with the radio programs of Elaine Sterne Carrington.

== Early life and career in California ==
Born in San Francisco, California in 1879, Marion S. Barney was the daughter of Alfred S. and Minnie Barney. She was the great great granddaughter of politician and military officer Jonathan D. Stevenson, and her father was employed in Stevenson's business while Stevenson was serving as a shipping commissioner for the United States Federal Government. At the age of 8 Marion moved to Oakland, California where her father worked in the real estate business.

While working professionally as an actress in local theaters, Barney attended the University of California, Berkeley. She made her professional stage debut as an actress at the age of 18 at the Columbia Theater in Oakland in a theatre troupe run by Harry Corson Clarke; performing in the play What Happened to Jones. In 1899 she performed with T. Daniel Frawley's theatre troupe at the Burbank Theatre as Mrs. Armstrong in The Senator and as the villainess Duchess de Sonnaz in a stage adapation of Ouida's novel Moths. Her father died that same year.

Marion remained with Frawley's company in 1900 for performances at the Clunie Opera House in Sacramento, California and the Los Angeles Theater in Los Angeles. At the latter theater she performed the roles of Seth Barth and Mrs. Vanplank in An Unconventional Honeymoon, and Madame Gresillon in In Paradise.

== Later life and career ==
In the fall of 1900 it was announced that Barney was engaged by E. H. Sothern to join his theatre troupe. She first performed in Sothern's company as Estella in Augustus Thomass Arizona in January 1901 in Chicago as a replacement for Jane Kennark. This was followed by performances in the same play later that year at the Masonic Temple Theatre in Fort Wayne, Indiana. Euclid Avenue Opera House in Cleveland, the Amphion Theatre in Brooklyn, the Walnut Street Theatre in Philadelphia, the Columbia Theatre in Washington, D.C., and Ford's Grand Opera House in Baltimore.

Barney spent the next several years touring in plays, and occasionally working on the New York stage; making her Broadway debut at the Savoy Theatre as Marie Flatter in Paul Armstrong's The Superstition of Sue (1904). In 1906 she appeared at Daly's Theatre's as Mrs. Bender in Augustus Thomas's The Embassy Ball. From 1908 until 1913 she was leading lady of the Orpheum Players at Philadelphia's Chestnut Street Theatre. Well-regarded for her work in summer stock, Barney was said to be possessed of a sharp memory which aided her in performance. She returned to Broadway as Claudia Proclea in Francis L. Kenzel's Pilate's Daughter at the Century Theatre in 14, and as Mrs. Reynolds in George Arliss's Hamilton at the Knickerbocker Theatre in 1917.

In 1919-1920 Barney abandoned the stage temporarily to make ten silent films before returning to the New York stage. She had previously appeared in two film in 1913: In the Toils and In the Twilight. Her other film credits included To Him That Hath (1918, as Lillian Drew), Heart of Gold (1919, as Madame Estelle), Mandarin's Gold (1919, as Mrs. Stone), The Spirit of Lafayette (1919, as Adrienne), Love and the Woman (1919, as Hannah Shay), Dust of Desire (1919, as Mrs. Jack Stevens), His Father's Wife (1919, as Mrs. Harrison Tyler), The Woman of Lies (1919, as Mrs. Bland), The Poison Pen (1919, as Mrs. Filbert), The Steel King (1919, as Mrs. Phillips Wetherell), and The Matrimonial Web (1921, as Mrs. Sanborn).

Barney starred as Mary Courtney in the 1920-1921 Broadway production of Paul Kester's The Woman of Bronze at the Frazee Theatre. She returned to Broadway frequently in the 1920s; appearing as Queen Catherine in Astrid Argyll's The Trial of Joan of Arc (1921, Shubert Theatre); Donna Rodriguez in Melchior Lengyel's Sancho Panza (1923, Hudson Theatre); Mrs. Ethel Emerson in Irving Kaye Davis's The Right to Dream (1924, Punch & Judy Theatre); Mrs. Standard in Dana Burnet's The Habitual Husband (1924, 48th Street Theatre); Mrs. Ridgley in John B. Hymer and Le Roy Clemens's Aloma of the South Seas (1925, Lyric Theatre); Mary Martin in George S. Kaufman's The Butter and Egg Man (1925-1926, Longacre Theatre; and returning to her role of Mary Courtney in the 1927 revival of The Woman of Bronze at the Lyric Theatre.

In 1929 Barney portrayed Mrs. Reed in George Kelly's Maggie the Magnificent at the Cort Theatre. Some of her last appearances on the New York stage were as Mrs. Ferris in George Kelly's Philip Goes Forth (1931, Biltmore Theatre), and Mary in Michael Birmingham and Gilbert Emery's Far-Away Horses (1933, Martin Beck Theatre). In the 1930s she turned her attention to radio, beginning with the title role of an NBC Blue summer program titled Tish in 1932. For Carrington she was a series regular, most notably playing matronly characters in Rosemary, Pepper Young's Family, and When a Girl Marries. Other radio programs on which she appeared included: The Chase Twins, Gangbusters, Home of the Brave, Neighbors, Pages of Romance, Peables Takes Charge, Special Investigator, and We the People. She also appeared in another Carrington serial, Marriage for Two. She remained busy as a radio actress into the 1950s.

Barney died in 1968.
