= Reported Missing! =

1937 film

- Theatrical release poster
- Directed by: Milton Carruth
- Screenplay by: Jerome Chodorov; Joseph Fields
- Story by: Verne Whitehead
- Produced by: E. M. Asher
- Starring: William Gargan; Jean Rogers; Dick Purcell; Hobart Cavanaugh; Michael Fitzmaurice; Joe Sawyer; Billy Wayne; Robert Spencer
- Cinematography: George Robinson
- Edited by: Paul Landres
- Production company: Universal Pictures
- Distributed by: Universal Pictures
- Release date: August 15, 1937
- Running time: 63 minutes
- Country: United States
- Language: English

Reported Missing! is a 1937 American thriller film directed by Milton Carruth and written by Jerome Chodorov and Joseph Fields. The film stars William Gargan, Jean Rogers, Dick Purcell, Hobart Cavanaugh, Michael Fitzmaurice, Joe Sawyer, Billy Wayne, and Robert Spencer. The film was released on August 15, 1937, by Universal Pictures.

== Plot ==
The story follows a gang that sabotages airplanes, making them crash and then robbing the victims.

== Cast ==
- William Gargan as Steve Browning
- Jean Rogers as Jean Clayton
- Dick Purcell as Paul Wayne
- Hobart Cavanaugh as 'Ab' Steele
- Michael Fitzmaurice as Jack Clayton
- Joe Sawyer as 'Brad' Martin
- Billy Wayne as John Duffy
- Robert Spencer as Bill Evans

== Critical reception ==
Harrison's Reports commented that although the plot followed "familiar lines" the result was "a fair melodrama" with a suspenseful second half.
