= Alibi (1929 film) =

1929 film by Roland West

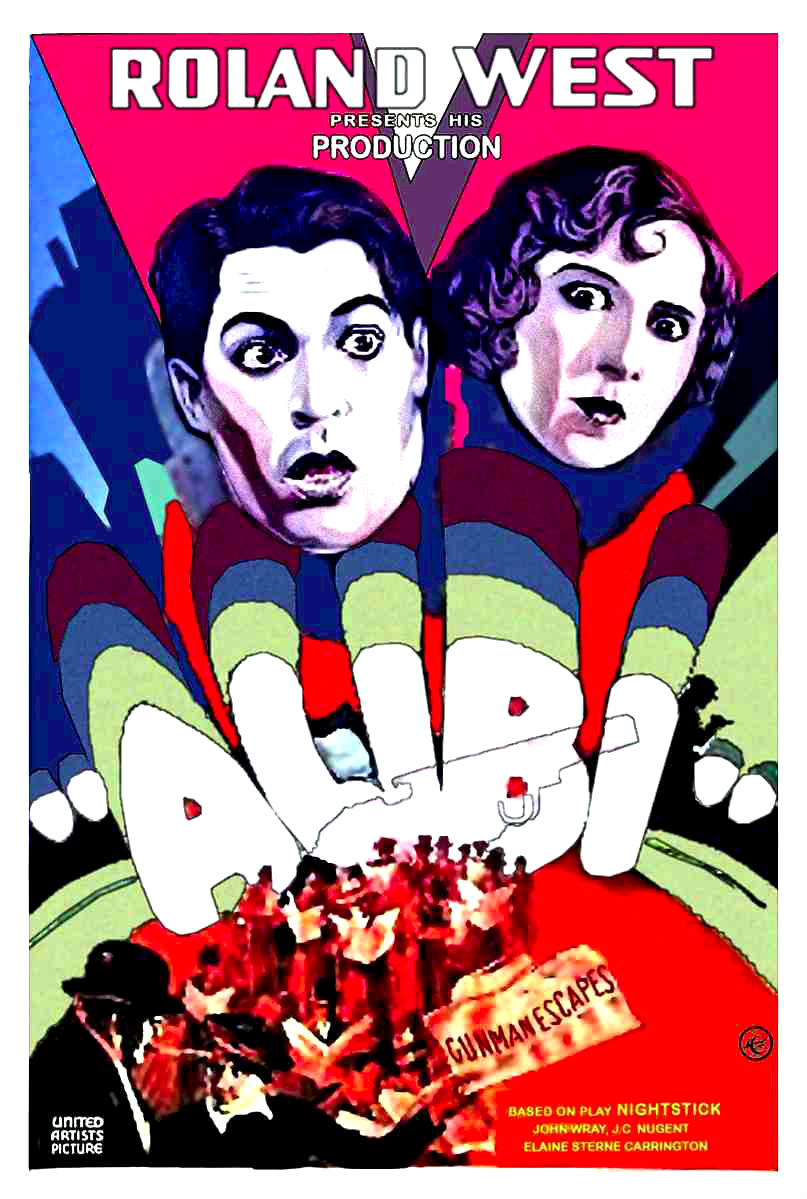
- Theatrical release poster
- Directed by: Roland West
- Written by: Elaine Sterne Carrington
- Based on: Nightstick by Elaine Sterne Carrington, J.C. Nugent, Elliott Nugent, and John Wray
- Produced by: Roland West
- Starring: Chester Morris; Mae Busch
- Cinematography: Ray June
- Distributed by: United Artists
- Release date: April 20, 1929
- Running time: 90 minutes
- Country: United States
- Language: English

Alibi (also known as The Perfect Alibi, Nightstick) is a 1929 American crime film directed by Roland West. The screenplay was written by West and C. Gardner Sullivan, who adapted the 1927 Broadway stage play, Nightstick, written by Elaine Sterne Carrington, J.C. Nugent, Elliott Nugent, and John Wray.

The movie is a crime drama starring Chester Morris, Harry Stubbs, Mae Busch, and Regis Toomey. Director West experimented a great deal with sound, music, and camera angles.

As a film published in 1929, it entered the public domain on January 1, 2025.

== Plot ==
Alibi (1929)

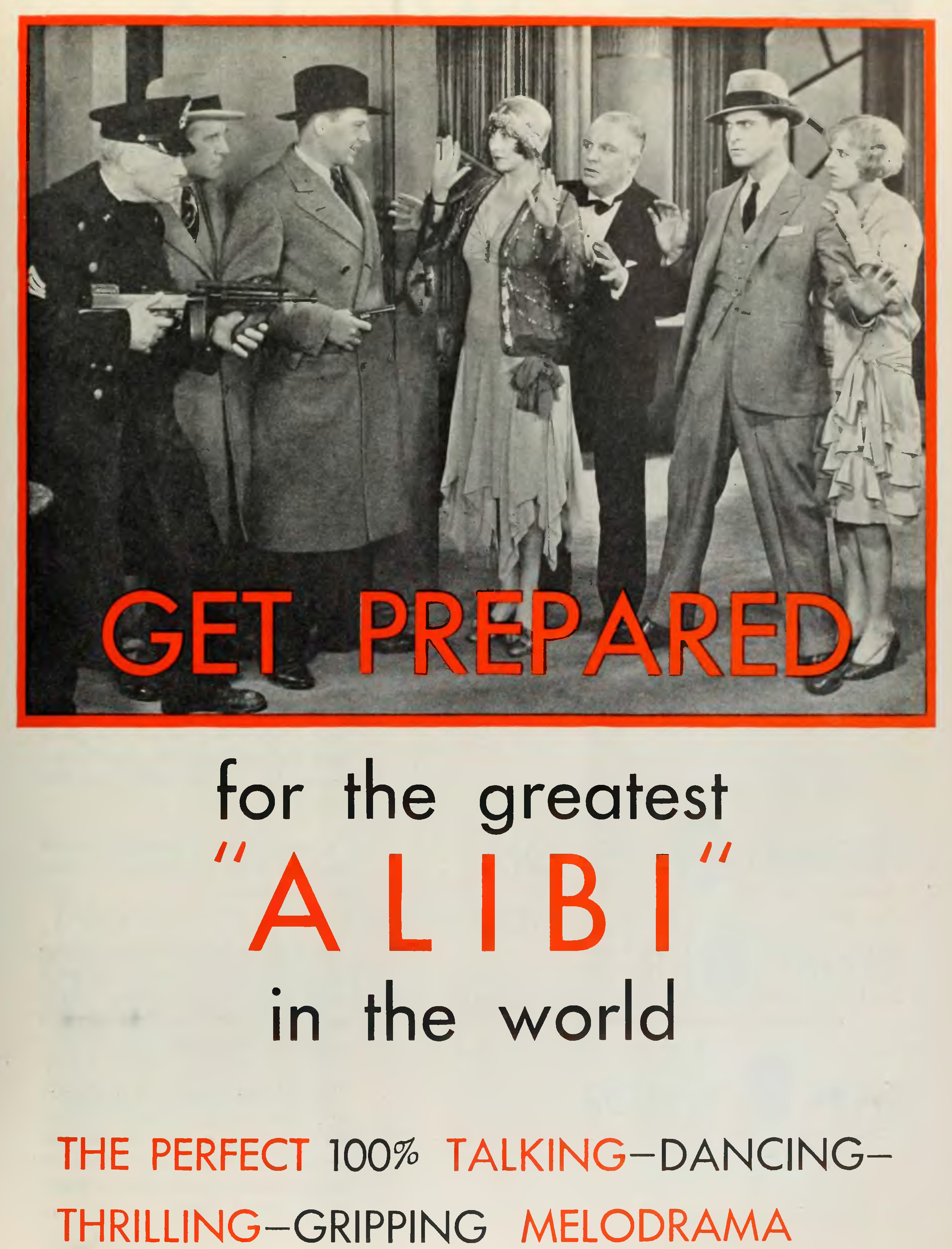
Alibi ad in The Film Daily, 1929

Joan Manning, the daughter of a police sergeant, secretly marries Chick Williams, a gangleader who convinces her that he is leading an honest life. Chick attends the theater with Joan and, at the intermission, sneaks away, committing a robbery during which a policeman is killed. Chick is suspected of the crime but is able to use Joan to substantiate his alibi. The police plant Danny McGann, an undercover agent, in Chick's gang; but he is discovered, and Chick murders him. Chick is later cornered by the police in his own home. Before they can arrest him, he flips the light switch, plunging the room into darkness. In the midst of the chaos, Chick escapes to the roof. He attempts to jump off to a nearby building, but stumbles on the landing, thus falling to his death.

== Cast ==
- Chester Morris as Chick Williams
- Eleanor Griffith as Joan Manning Williams
- Pat O’Malley as Detective Sgt. Tommy Glennon
- Purnell Pratt as Police Sgt. Pete Manning
- Regis Toomey as Danny McGann/Billy Morgan
- Mae Busch as Daisy Thomas
- Harry Stubbs as Buck Bachman
- Irma Harrison as Toots
- Elmer Ballard as Soft Malone, cab driver (uncredited)
- James Bradbury Jr. as Blake, a crook (uncredited)
- Ed Brady as George Stanislaus David (uncredited)
- Kernan Cripps as Trask, the plainclothesman (uncredited)
- Virginia *Flohri as the singer in the theater (uncredited)
- Al Hill as Brown, a crook (uncredited)
- DeWitt Jennings as Officer O'Brien (uncredited)

== Reception ==
The film was nominated for three Academy Awards, including for Best Picture (Roland West), Best Actor in a Leading Role (Chester Morris) and Best Art Direction (William Cameron Menzies).Time praised it as "more credible than most crook pictures," and The New York Times said it was "by far the best of the gangster films, and the fact that it is equipped with dialogue makes it all the more stirring." In a retrospective review, Bruce G. Hallenbeck said the film was "creaky by today's standards...[but] still fun to watch."

== Censorship ==
When Alibi was released in the United States, many states and cities in the United States had censor boards that could require cuts or other eliminations before the film could be shown. The Chicago Board of Censors banned the film, citing it for "immorality, criminality, and depravity." United Artists appealed the ban to circuit court, where the Board explained that the film had been banned because it ridiculed the police. After watching the film, Judge Harry Fisher, stating that "censorship is a form of tyranny at best, and abhorrent to ideals of the American people," issued an injunction allowing the film to be shown in an U.A. theater.

== See also ==
- List of early sound feature films (1926–1929)
