= The Butter and Egg Man (1928 film) =

1928 American silent film

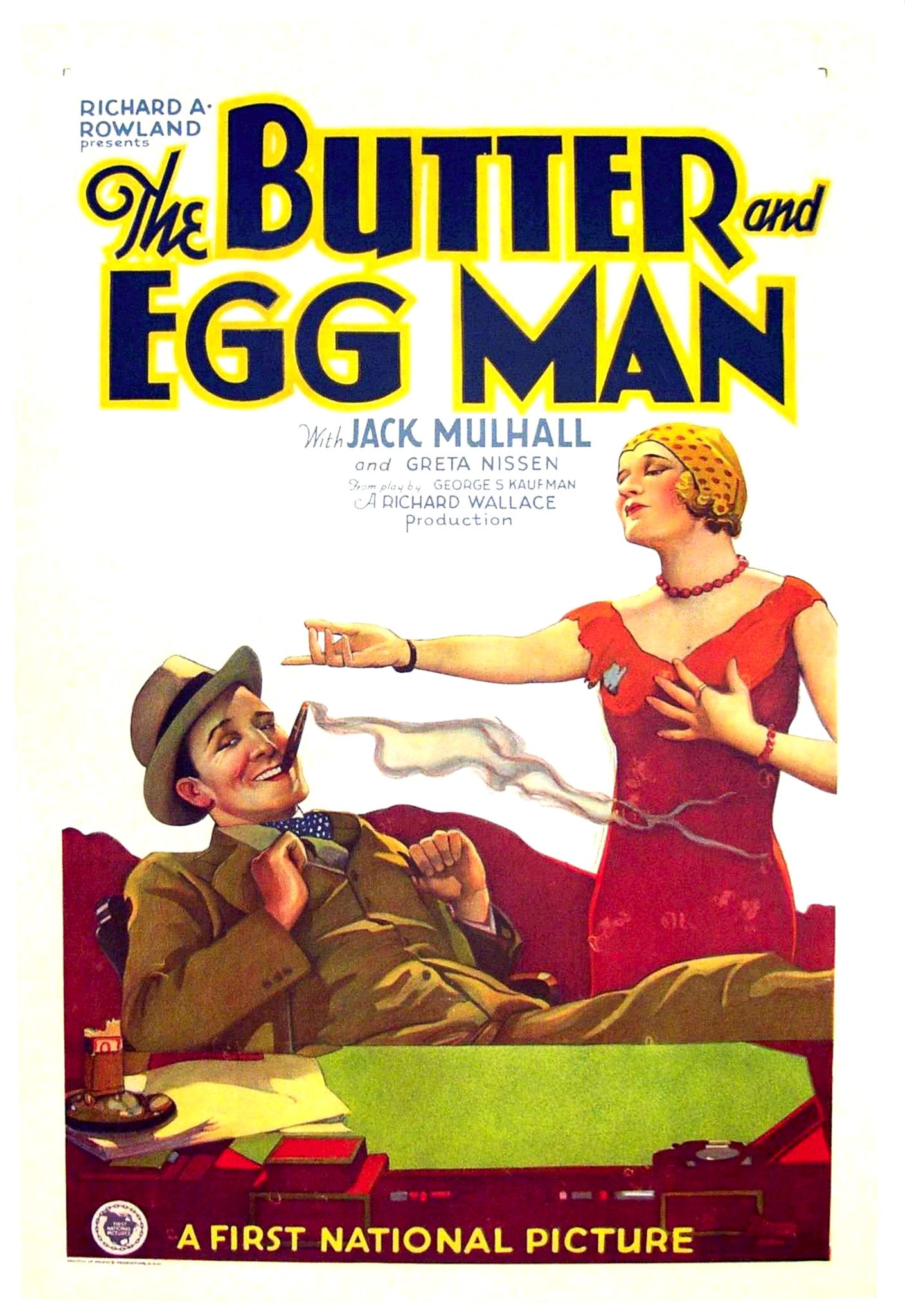
- Film poster
- Directed by: Richard Wallace
- Written by: Adelaide Heilbron; Jack Jarmuth; Gene Towne
- Based on: The Butter and Egg Man by George S. Kaufman
- Starring: Jack Mulhall; Greta Nissen; Sam Hardy
- Cinematography: George J. Folsey
- Edited by: LeRoy Stone
- Production company: First National Pictures
- Distributed by: Warner Bros. Pictures
- Release date: August 27, 1928
- Running time: 70 minutes
- Country: United States
- Language: Silent (English intertitles)

The Butter and Egg Man is a 1928 American silent comedy film directed by Richard Wallace and starring Jack Mulhall, Greta Nissen, and Sam Hardy. It is based on the 1925 play The Butter and Egg Man. It was remade by the studio's successor company Warner Brothers as a sound film Hello, Sweetheart in 1935.

== Plot ==
Peter Jones (Jack Mulhall), a young man from Ohio, comes to Broadway to enter the theater business as a producer. Jones is persuaded to invest in a production by two men who are scamming him but gets his revenge by turning the show into a great success.

== Cast ==
- Jack Mulhall as Peter Jones
- Greta Nissen as Mary Martin
- Sam Hardy as Joe Lehman
- William Demarest as Jack McLure
- Gertrude Astor as Fanny Lehman

== Preservation status ==
The film is now lost.

== Bibliography ==
- James Monaco. The Encyclopedia of Film. Perigee Books, 1991.
