= Carroll Moore =

American screenwriter

Carroll Byron Moore Jr (May 4, 1913 – February 5, 1977) was an American playwright, screenwriter, and producer. He was best known for his work on The Danny Kaye Show, Rhoda, and Send Me No Flowers (was received a film adaptation in 1964).

== Career ==
Moore was born in Somerville, Massachusetts and served in the Navy during World War II. Moore began his career in radio, while television was just beginning to gain prominence. His plays were included in radio programs including The Carrington Playhouse (circa 1946), which produced original plays by new writers, and Guest Star (1947), as well as The Henry Morgan Show (1948).

Later in his career, Moore frequently collaborated with Norman Barasch, writing both plays and television together. With Barasch, he was heavily involved with the game show Two for the Money since its inception, making up what executive producer Ira Skutch called "the backbone of the program's comedy structure" by choosing contestants to interview and scripting their questions and jokes.

Moore was nominated for three Primetime Emmy Awards: Outstanding Writing in Variety in 1966 (The Danny Kaye Show), Outstanding Writing in Variety in 1971 (The Kraft Music Hall), and Outstanding Writing in a Comedy Series in 1974 (Rhoda).

He wrote at least two Broadway plays Make a Million and Send Me No Flowers (which inspired a 1964 film of the same name).

Moore died at Cedars-Sinai Hospital in Los Angeles on February 5, 1977.
