= The Tenderfoot (film) =

1932 film

- Directed by: Ray Enright
- Written by: Earl Baldwin; Monty Banks; Arthur Caesar (adaptation)
- Based on: The Tenderfoot; 1903 play by: Richard Carle; The Butter and Egg Man 1925 play; George S. Kaufman
- Starring: Joe E. Brown; Ginger Rogers
- Cinematography: Gregg Toland
- Edited by: Owen Marks
- Color process: Black and white
- Production company: First National Pictures
- Distributed by: Warner Bros. Pictures
- Release date: May 23, 1932
- Running time: 69 minutes
- Country: United States
- Language: English

The Tenderfoot is a 1932 American Pre-Code comedy western film directed by Ray Enright and written by Earl Baldwin, Monty Banks and Arthur Caesar. The film stars Joe E. Brown and Ginger Rogers. The film was released by Warner Bros. Pictures on May 23, 1932. It is based on Richard Carle's 1903 play The Tenderfoot, and George S. Kaufman's 1925 play The Butter and Egg Man.

== Plot ==
Calvin Jones, a naïve cowboy from Texas, comes to New York City, determined to take care of his mother by investing his life savings in a Broadway show. He is duped by producers Lehman and McLure into buying a 49-percent interest in their new show, a surefire flop.

Lehman's secretary, Ruth Weston, catches the shy cowboy's eye. Jones makes up his mind to produce the play by himself after Lehman and McLure close it out of town. When he can't pay for proper costumes, his star actress quits, so Ruth goes on in her place.

Although the play is a drama, it is so poorly done that the audience mistakes it for a comedy. The laughter makes it a surprise comedy hit. Jones and Ruth make a big profit, get married and decide to live in Texas.

== Cast ==
- Joe E. Brown as Calvin Jones
- Ginger Rogers as Ruth Weston
- Lew Cody as Joe Lehman
- Vivien Oakland as Miss Martin
- Robert Greig as Mack
- Ralph Ince as Dolan
- Marion Byron as Kitty (as Marion Bryon)
- Spencer Charters as Oscar
- Douglas Gerrard as Stage Director
