= When a Girl Marries =

American radio soap opera (1939–1957)

- When a Girl Marries cast member Ellen Fenwick
- Genre: Soap opera
- Country of origin: United States
- Language: English
- Syndicates: CBS; ABC; NBC
- Created by: Elaine Sterne Carrington
- Written by: Elaine Sterne Carrington
- Original release: May 29, 1939 – August 30, 1957
- Opening theme: Serenade by Drigo

When a Girl Marries is an American daytime radio drama that was broadcast on three major radio networks from 1939 to 1957. Created by Elaine Sterne Carrington (who also was responsible for Pepper Young's Family and Rosemary), it was the highest rated soap opera during the mid-1940s.

== Air dates and audience ==
The series premiered May 29, 1939, on CBS, moving to NBC on September 29, 1941, and then to ABC on July 2, 1951. The show ended its run on August 30, 1957.

As it began its third year on the air, the program's audience was estimated at 8 million per week.

Sponsors included Prudential Insurance, General Foods and Carnation.

== Synopsis ==
Promoted as "the tender, human story of young married life, dedicated to everyone who has ever been in love," the convoluted plot threads followed a married couple, Harry Davis (John Raby, Robert Haag) and Joan Field Davis (Noel Mills, Mary Jane Higby), as they confronted endless problems in the small town of Stanwood. Carrington created numerous conflicts by contrasting Harry's impoverished background with Joan's high society family.

== Cast and crew ==
Others in the cast included Michael Fitzmaurice, Marion Barney, Ellen Fenwick and Staats Cotsworth. Announcers included Frank Gallop, Bill Mazer and George Ansbro. Music was by organist Rosa Rio and others.

== Australian version ==
A long-running Australian version was broadcast on the Major Broadcasting Network. Prior to World War II, transcription discs of many U.S. programs were imported into Australia, but after America entered the war, this became impossible, but scripts were still able to be imported, and the Australian version was based on the U.S. program.

Ron Randell starred. Writers included Peter Yeldham.

A download of the first Australian episode is available on YouTube.

== TV spinoff ==
On August 3, 1953, Follow Your Heart debuted on NBC-TV. Created by Carrington, the program was based on the early scripts of When a Girl Marries. It was off the air by January 8, 1954.
