= Pepper Young's Family =

- Other names: Red Adams; Red Davis; Forever Young
- Genre: Daytime serial drama
- Running time: 15/30 minutes
- Country of origin: United States
- Language: English
- Home station: NBC
- Starring: Burgess Meredith; Marion Barney
- Announcer: Martin Block
- Created by: Elaine Sterne Carrington
- Written by: Elaine Sterne Carrington
- Directed by: Edwin Wolfe
- Original release: 1932 – 1959
- Audio format: Mono
- Opening theme: "Au Matin"
- Sponsored by: Beech-Nut Gum, Camay

Pepper Young's Family is a daytime drama series, with various format and title changes during its long run from 1932 to 1959. It was created and written by short story author and playwright Elaine Sterne Carrington.

== History ==
With Burgess Meredith in the title role, the program began as Red Adams, about high school athlete Red Adams, his family, and his friends. The thirty-minute series was broadcast on the Blue Network, airing on Sunday nights at 10:30pm. When Beech-Nut Gum signed as a sponsor, they wanted no mention of their competition, Adams gum, so the title changed to Red Davis, a fifteen-minute series heard three times a week from 1933 to 1935. The series was again retitled, and the fifteen-minute Forever Young was heard on NBC weekdays at 3pm from January 13 to June 26, 1936. On June 29, it became Pepper Young's Family, continuing on NBC for the next 23 years with Procter & Gamble's Camay as the sponsor.

Meredith was replaced by Curtis Arnall in 1934, who played the title role through 1937 when Lawson Zerbe took over. Next Mason Adams assumed Pepper's persona in 1945 and continued to portray him through the final episode in 1959, more than half of the program's run.

In the storyline, high school athlete Larry "Pepper" Young and his sister Peggy (Elizabeth Wragge) lived in the small town of Elmwood where their father, Sam Young (Jack Roseleigh, Bill Adams, Thomas Chalmers) ran a manufacturing company. Pepper's girl friend was Linda Benton (Eunice Howard), and his buddy was Nick Havens (John Kane). Leaving school, Pepper took a job as a reporter with the local Free Press. When Pepper and Linda (played by Margaret Draper) married, they had a child, Button. Sam Young became Elmwood's mayor. Oil was discovered on the farm where Pepper and Linda lived, but a fire at the oil well spread, burning down much of the town.

Others in the cast were Grace Albert, Marion Barney (as Pepper's mother), Alan Bunce, Michael Fitzmaurice, Stacy Harris, Claire Howard, Madge Kennedy, Greta Kvalden, Cecil Roy, Laddie Seaman, Jean Sothern, Arthur Vinton, Edwin Wolfe (who also directed some shows).

Announcers included Martin Block, Alan Kent and Richard Stark. The opening piano theme was Au Matin.

Carrington continued to script the program until her death in 1958. She also wrote scripts for two other daytime dramas, When a Girl Marries and Rosemary.

In 1964, NANA Radio began production of newly written episodes of Pepper Young's Family. At least 88 of these revival episodes are in circulation today.

In 1948, the United Council of Church Women awarded the program a National Family Week radio citation, which the show had also won in the previous year.

== Comic strip adaptation ==
Bernard Krigstein and Alex Kotzky separately adapted the radio series into a comic strip in 1950, but their work never found a publisher.

== See also ==
- List of radio soap operas

== Sources ==
- Cox, Jim. Historical Dictionary of American Radio Soap Operas, Scarecrow Press, 2005.
