= Norman Barasch =

American playwright, producer, and screenwriter (1922–2019)

Norman Barasch (February 18, 1922 - August 13, 2019) was an American playwright, producer and screenwriter. He was co-author, with Carroll Moore, of the play Send Me No Flowers, which was the basis for the 1964 film of the same name. Barasch died in August 2019 at his home in Greenwich, Connecticut, at the age of 97.
