= Barmy in Wonderland =

1952 novel by P. G. Wodehouse

- First edition (UK)
- Author: P. G. Wodehouse
- Cover artist: Frank Ford
- Language: English
- Genre: Comic novel
- Publisher: Herbert Jenkins (UK); Doubleday & Company (US)
- Publication date: 21 April 1952 (UK); 8 May 1952 (US)
- Publication place: United Kingdom
- Media type: Print (Hardcover)
- Pages: 221 pp

Barmy in Wonderland is a novel by P. G. Wodehouse, first published in the United Kingdom on 21 April 1952 by Herbert Jenkins, London, and in the United States on 8 May 1952 by Doubleday & Company, New York, under the title Angel Cake. The novel may be considered part of the expanded Drones Club canon, since the main character Barmy Fotheringay-Phipps is a member of the club.

Wodehouse adapted the novel from a play, The Butter and Egg Man (1925), by George S. Kaufman and, echoing Shakespeare's dedication of his Sonnets, dedicated the US edition to "the onlie begetter of these insuing sonnets, Mr G S K".

The central character is Cyril "Barmy" Fotheringay-Phipps (pronounced "Fungy Fips"), an amiable, somewhat gullible young Englishman who falls in love with a spirited American woman named Eileen "Dinty" Moore and finds himself suddenly thrown into the daunting world of Broadway theatre after investing in a play. His nickname, "Barmy", was given to him as a not-overly-bright schoolchild who seemed willing to go along with anything, no matter how transparently absurd. He had first appeared in Wodehouse's 1936 short story "Tried in the Furnace", and in Barmy on Wonderland he makes reference to the events in that story.

== Plot ==
J. G. Anderson, owner of the Hotel Washington in Bessemer, Ohio and the Lakeside Inn near Skeewassett, Maine, is staying at the Lakeside Inn. He is angered after a hotel guest, the famous but obnoxious actor Mervyn Potter, and Anderson's desk clerk, amiable and impressionable Cyril "Barmy" Fotheringay-Phipps, wake him at 3 a.m. to give him a frog. Anderson intends to fire Barmy, but instead decides to sell the Hotel Washington to Barmy after Potter mentions that Barmy has inherited a fortune. It is also mentioned that, before leaving London two years prior, Barmy saw a fortune teller in Wimbledon named Gypsy Sybil who predicted that Barmy would take a long journey, meet a fair girl, have some trouble with a dark man, and acquire a lot of money. Barmy, who has taken the long journey and got the money, now looks forward to meeting the fair girl, and is not worried about the dark man.

Potter tells Barmy that he should not buy the hotel but instead invest in an upcoming Lehmac Productions play that Potter is starring in. Anderson offers to sell Barmy the hotel for a hundred thousand dollars, but Barmy only has about twenty thousand. Anderson fires Barmy and Barmy goes to New York to invest in the play. There, Barmy sees a fair girl, Eileen "Dinty" Moore, looking longingly through a shop window at a fancy hat, and instantly falls in love with her. He tosses his cigar away, only for it to burn the old hat she is currently wearing. He buys the fancy hat for her to replace it. Dinty thanks Barmy before leaving. Barmy fears he will never see her again.

Barmy spends the evening in town with Potter, though Potter is drunk and domineering. He takes Barmy to see his fiancée Hermione (or Heloise) Brimble at her home in King's Point, Long Island, and makes Barmy break into the house. The Brimbles' butler hears him and fires off a revolver, causing Barmy to hide in a tree. Hermione comes upon the scene and sees Potter drunk. She declares that their engagement will be over if he ever drinks alcohol again.

At the office of Lehmac Productions, business partners Joe Lehman and Jack McClure desperately need an investor (or "angel") and deceive Barmy about their play's chance of success. The play, titled Sacrifice, has a somewhat incoherent plot, but is essentially about a man who chooses to take the blame for a crime committed by the brother of the woman he loves. Barmy agrees to invest ten thousand dollars when he sees that Dinty is Lehman's secretary. Barmy gets carried away and kisses her; she slaps him and he apologizes. He explains that he was going to ask her to marry him and invested half of his money in the play to be near her, which amazes Dinty.

Just before the play opens in the try-out town of Syracuse, Potter gets drunk and leaves the troupe. He is distraught because his fiancée found out he had tried to drink in secret and ended their engagement. His understudy takes his place. The show goes badly, and after the performance, a long disorderly conference ensues in Barmy's hotel room in which the members of the troupe argue about how to improve the play. Barmy tries to speak, but is shouted down by Lehman. Dinty defends Barmy, and Barmy, who starts talking with the same assertive language and slang used by Lehman, swiftly makes a deal to buy out Lehman and McClure with the rest of his inheritance.

Dinty confesses that she loves Barmy. Together, they convince the assistant manager of their hotel, Oscar Fritchie, to invest in the play. Mervyn Potter returns, having realized that he is better off without his ex-fiancée. He suggests turning the play into a farcical comedy. The play is now a hit and opens on Broadway. However, a dark lawyer appears with proof that Sacrifice has been plagiarized. He says that the play will be closed unless Barmy agrees to give up most of the profits. Dinty convinces the lawyer to leave for half an hour. While the lawyer is out, Lehman and McClure return, intending to take over the now-successful play again. Barmy sells it to them for a hundred thousand dollars. Barmy cheerfully sets off with Dinty to marry her and buy Anderson's hotel, where Fritchie will be the manager.

== Publication history ==
In a letter to his friend William "Bill" Townend, dated 6 July 1951, Wodehouse stated that he had finished the book, which he titled The Butter and Egg Man, after the play it was based on, The Butter and Egg Man by George S. Kaufman. However, Wodehouse expressed concern in the letter about whether or not to explicitly associate his novel with Kaufman's play, worrying that if he did, "people will say 'this must be a rehash of a play,'" or if he did not, "everybody will say 'this is a complete steal from Kaufman's play The Butter and Egg Man.'". The book was ultimately published with a different title, Barmy in Wonderland in the UK and Angel Cake in the US. Wodehouse dedicated the novel to Kaufman, and split the royalties of the book fifty-fifty with him.

A condensed version of the novel was published in the Canadian magazine Star Weekly, a weekend supplement of the Toronto Star, on 13 September 1952. The story was published under the title Angel Cake.
