= Send Me No Flowers =

1964 film by Norman Jewison

- Theatrical release poster
- Directed by: Norman Jewison
- Screenplay by: Julius Epstein
- Based on: Send Me No Flowers by Norman Barasch; Carroll Moore
- Produced by: Harry Keller
- Starring: Rock Hudson; Doris Day; Tony Randall; Hal March; Paul Lynde; Edward Andrews; Patricia Barry; Clint Walker
- Cinematography: Daniel L. Fapp
- Edited by: J. Terry Williams
- Music by: Frank De Vol
- Color process: Technicolor
- Production companies: Martin Melcher Productions; Spinel Entertainment
- Distributed by: Universal Studios
- Release date: October 14, 1964 (United States)
- Running time: 100 minutes
- Country: United States
- Language: English
- Box office: $9.1 million

Send Me No Flowers is a 1964 American romantic comedy film directed by Norman Jewison from a screenplay by Julius Epstein, based on the play of the same name by Norman Barasch and Carroll Moore, which had a brief run on Broadway in 1960. It stars Rock Hudson, Doris Day, and Tony Randall. Following Pillow Talk (1959) and Lover Come Back (1961), it is the third and final film in which Hudson, Day, and Randall starred together.

The title tune was written by Hal David and Burt Bacharach.

== Plot ==
George Kimball, a hypochondriac, lives with his wife Judy in the suburbs. Judy learns from the milkman that their neighbors, the Bullards, are getting a divorce, and shares the news with George.

Over lunch, George is appalled as a bachelor acquaintance, Winston Burr, gleefully describes how he contacts women who are getting divorced and pretends to console them, hoping to seduce them while they are vulnerable.

George visits his doctor and longtime friend, Ralph Morrissey, after experiencing chest pains. He overhears the doctor discussing on the phone a patient who only has a few weeks to live. George assumes that Morrissey is talking about him and is distraught. On the train home, he tells his friend, Arnold Nash, that he will die soon. He has decided not to tell Judy, knowing it will upset her. Arnold solemnly assures George that he will deliver the eulogy at his funeral.

That night, George dreams about Judy marrying Vito, an irresponsible young deliveryman more interested in her inheritance than in her. He visits a funeral home operated by Mr. Akins to buy a burial plot for three people, including a prospective new husband for Judy, giving him a $1000 check made out to "Cash", so that Judy will not discover what the check is for. He decides to find Judy a new husband and asks Arnold to help him.

On a golf outing, Judy's golf cart malfunctions and she is saved by her old college beau Bert Power, now a Texas oil baron. George, jealous over Bert's attentions to Judy, reluctantly agrees with Arnold that Bert would be a great husband for her. During an evening out, George forces Judy to dance and talk with Bert. When George runs into the newly divorced Linda Bullard, who is there with Winston, he takes her to the coat room and warns her about Winston's intentions. She thanks him and kisses him in gratitude. When Judy sees them, she storms out, thinking that he is pushing her to spend time with Bert so that he will feel less guilty about having an affair with Linda. George then tells Judy that he is dying. She is naturally skeptical because of George's history of hypochondria, so he tells her that she can call Dr. Morrissey for confirmation, which convinces her that he is telling the truth.

Judy insists that George use a wheelchair to conserve his energy. However, when she sees Dr. Morrissey and he tells her that George is fine, she thinks George is lying to wriggle out of the consequences of his affair. She rolls him out of the house in his wheelchair and locks him out, announcing her intention to divorce him. George spends the night at Arnold's house, during which time his various demands and idiosyncrasies cause Arnold to strike, one by one, many of the complimentary remarks about George he had planned on making in his eulogy. The next day, George desperately asks Arnold for advice on how to stop Judy from leaving him. Arnold insists that George, although he is innocent, must pretend to confess to Judy that he has had an affair, assure her it is over, and beg for forgiveness.

Judy leaves to buy a train ticket to Reno. George follows her to the train station, where, following Arnold's advice, he concocts a story about an affair he had with a Dolores Yellowstone (Judy has learned from Linda why she was kissing him) and shows Judy the stub from the $1000 check, made out to "Cash", that he had given "Dolores" so she could leave him and start a new life in New York. The scheme backfires as Judy refuses to forgive him, despite his attempt to renege on his "confession". When she goes home to retrieve her bags, Mr. Akins happens to drop by to deliver the burial contracts for George's and Judy's plots and shows her George's check. He also tells her that George had bought a third plot for her prospective second husband. He is mortified to learn that Judy still did not know about George's surprise. Judy now realizes that George had made up the Dolores Yellowstone story. When George arrives at the house, she lovingly "forgives" him. Winston arrives at the house hoping to make Judy his latest conquest, but George knocks him cold and presents Judy with the flowers Winston was carrying.

== Cast ==
- Rock Hudson as George Kimball
- Doris Day as Judy Kimball
- Tony Randall as Arnold Nash
- Paul Lynde as Mr. Akins
- Hal March as Winston Burr
- Edward Andrews as Dr. Ralph Morrissey
- Patricia Barry as Linda Bullard
- Clint Walker as Bert Power
- Clive Clerk as Vito
- Dave Willock as Milkman Ernie

== Reception ==
=== Box office ===
The film grossed $9,129,247 in the United States.

=== Critical response ===
The film was the last comedy for Doris Day and Rock Hudson and received mixed reviews. In his review in The New York Times, Bosley Crowther called it "a beautiful farce situation" and added, "Julius Epstein has written it ... with nimble inventiveness and style. And Norman Jewison has directed so that it stays within bounds of good taste, is never cruel or insensitive, and makes something good of every gag."

Variety felt "[it] doesn't carry the same voltage, either in laughs or originality, as Doris Day and Rock Hudson's two previous entries."

Time Out London calls it "probably the best of the Doris Day/Rock Hudson vehicles ... nicely set in a pastel-coloured suburban dreamworld, but the ineradicable blandness gets you down in the end."

Channel 4 says, "it would be churlish to complain that it is a little bland, fairly predictable and has an unsurprising happy ending. There's enough humour in the ensuing misunderstandings and enough skill in the playing and direction to stifle not just criticism but even the odd yawn."

== Awards and nominations ==
Award	Category	Nominee(s)	Result
Laurel Awards	Top Male Comedy Performance	Rock Hudson	Nominated
Laurel Awards	Top Female Comedy Performance	Doris Day	Won

== See also ==
- List of American films of 1964
