= The Butter and Egg Man =

1925 play by George S. Kaufman

- First edition 1926
- Original language: English
- Written by: George S. Kaufman
- Setting: Office of Lehmac Productions in New York City; a hotel in Syracuse

Premiere
- Date: September 23, 1925
- Place: Longacre Theatre, New York City, New York, US

The Butter and Egg Man is a 1925 play by George S. Kaufman, the only play he wrote without collaborating. It was a Broadway hit during the 1925–26 season at the Longacre Theatre. Adapted to film six times, it is still performed on stages today.

== Synopsis ==
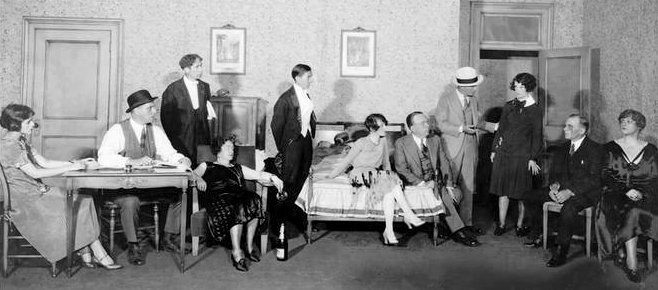
Gregory Kelly (center) in a scene from the Broadway production of The Butter and Egg Man (1925)

The play's title, of course, is Broadwayese of the moment—a generic name for all those gentlemen who come trustingly to Gotham with bankrolls, bent upon either reckless expenditure or equally reckless investment.

— From the dust jacket for the first edition of The Butter and Egg Man (Boni & Liveright, 1926)

A 1920s slang term popularized by Texas Guinan, a butter-and-egg man is a traveling businessman eager to spend large amounts of money in the big city—someone wealthy and unwary. A souvenir booklet for the original production of The Butter and Egg Man devoted an entire page to the various claims of origin for the phrase.

Peter Jones is a young man who arrives on Broadway from Chillicothe, Ohio, hoping to invest $20,000 in a play and turn a profit sufficient to buy a local hotel back home. He is conned by Joe Lehman and Jack McClure into backing their play with a 49-percent stake. The play opens out-of-town in Syracuse and bombs. Lehman and McClure want out, and Jones buys them out, and revamps the play into a huge hit. Jones then sells back to them at a huge profit after learning of claims that the play was stolen, and returns home to get his hotel.

Kaufman's comedy may be seen as a precursor to Mel Brooks' The Producers.

== Production ==
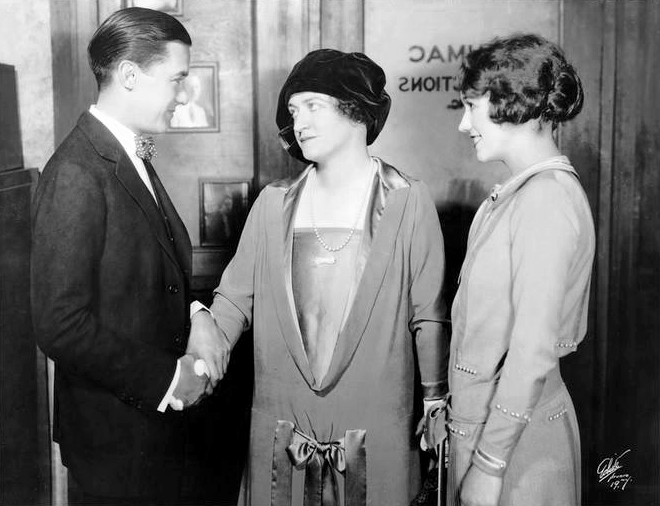
James Gleason directed the Broadway production of The Butter and Egg Man, in which his wife Lucile Webster (center) appeared with Gregory Kelly and Sylvia Field.

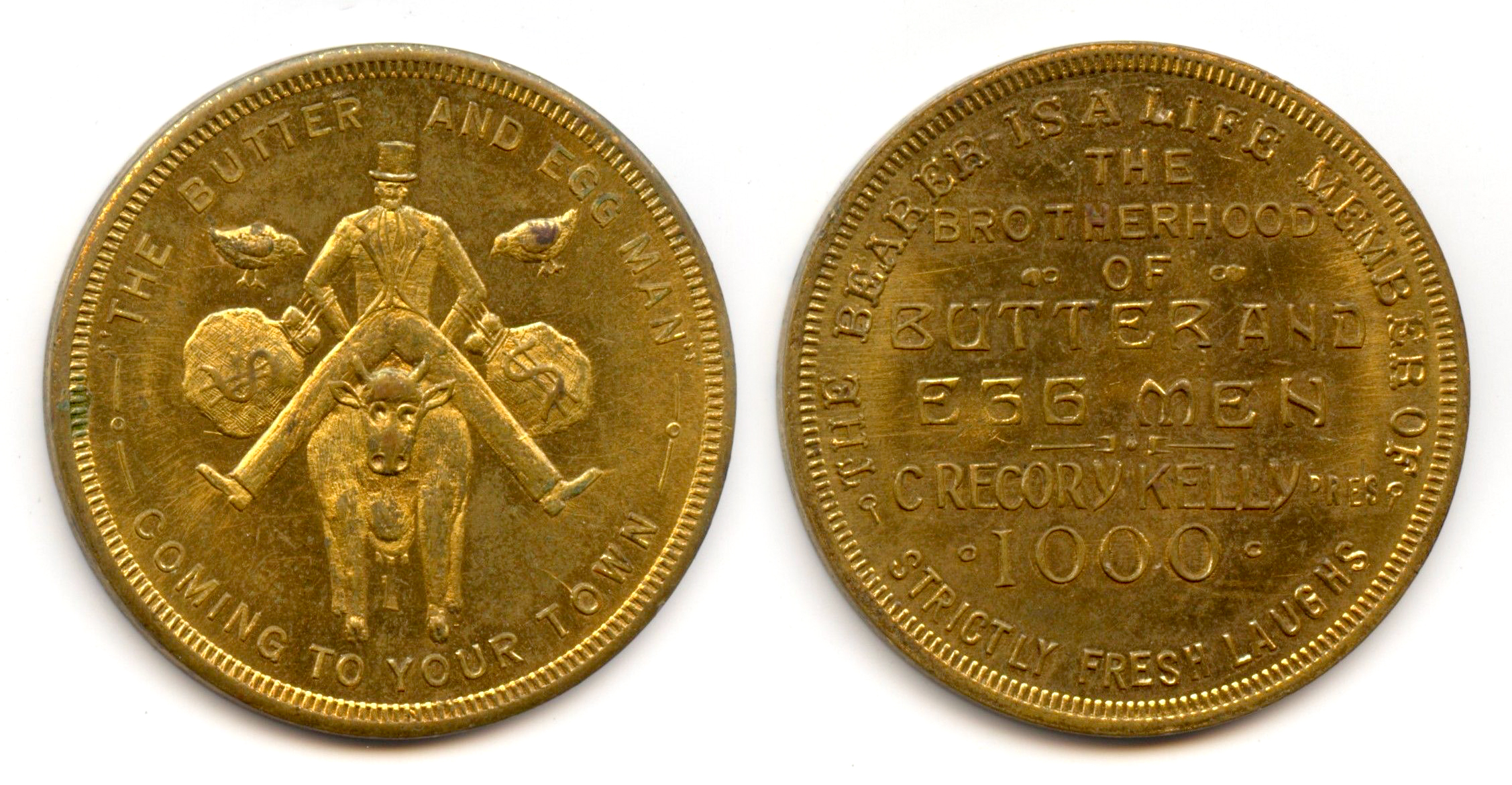
Promotional theatre token for the touring production of The Butter and Egg Man (1926)

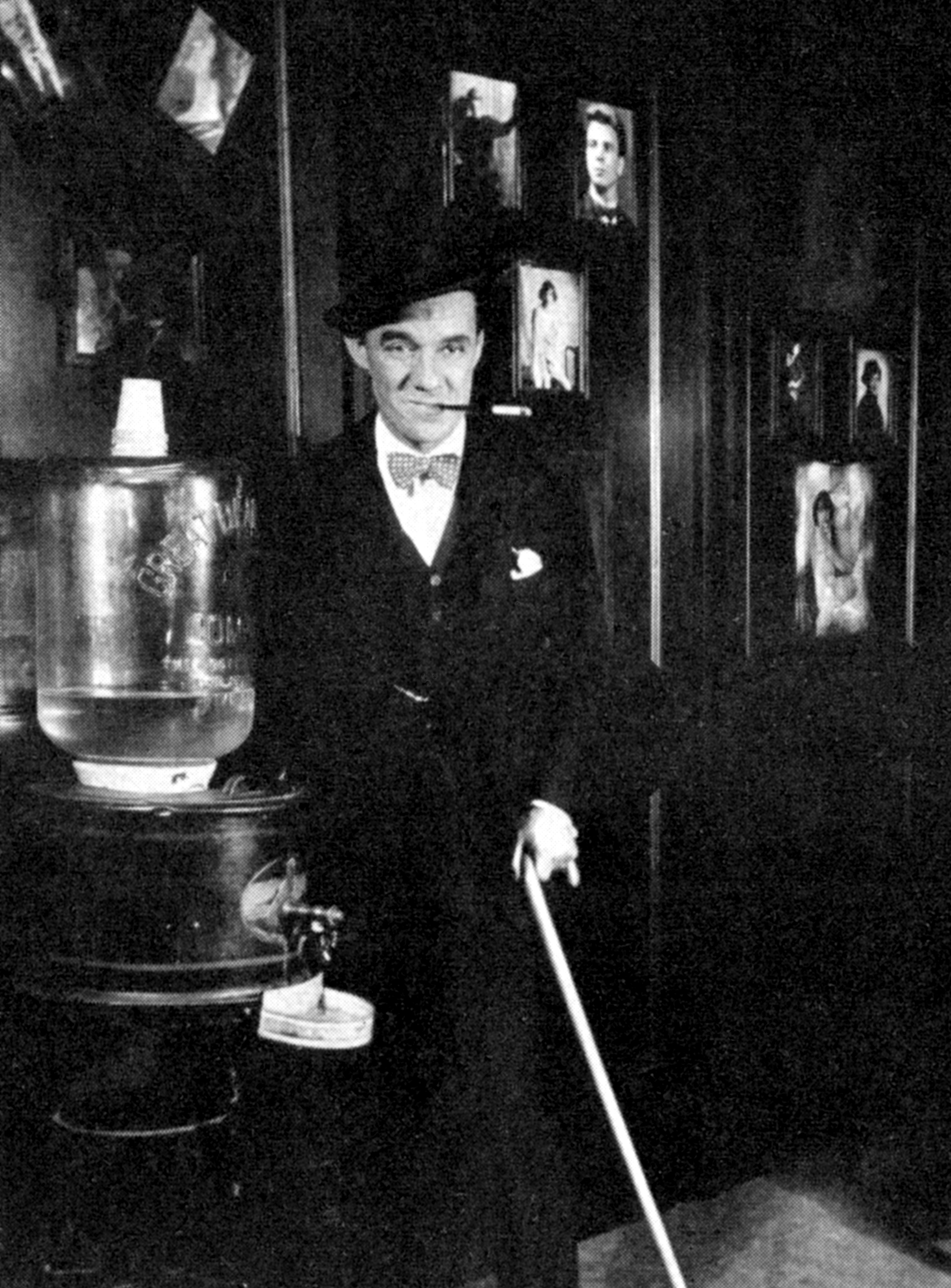
Gregory Kelly as Peter Jones in The Butter and Egg Man (1925)

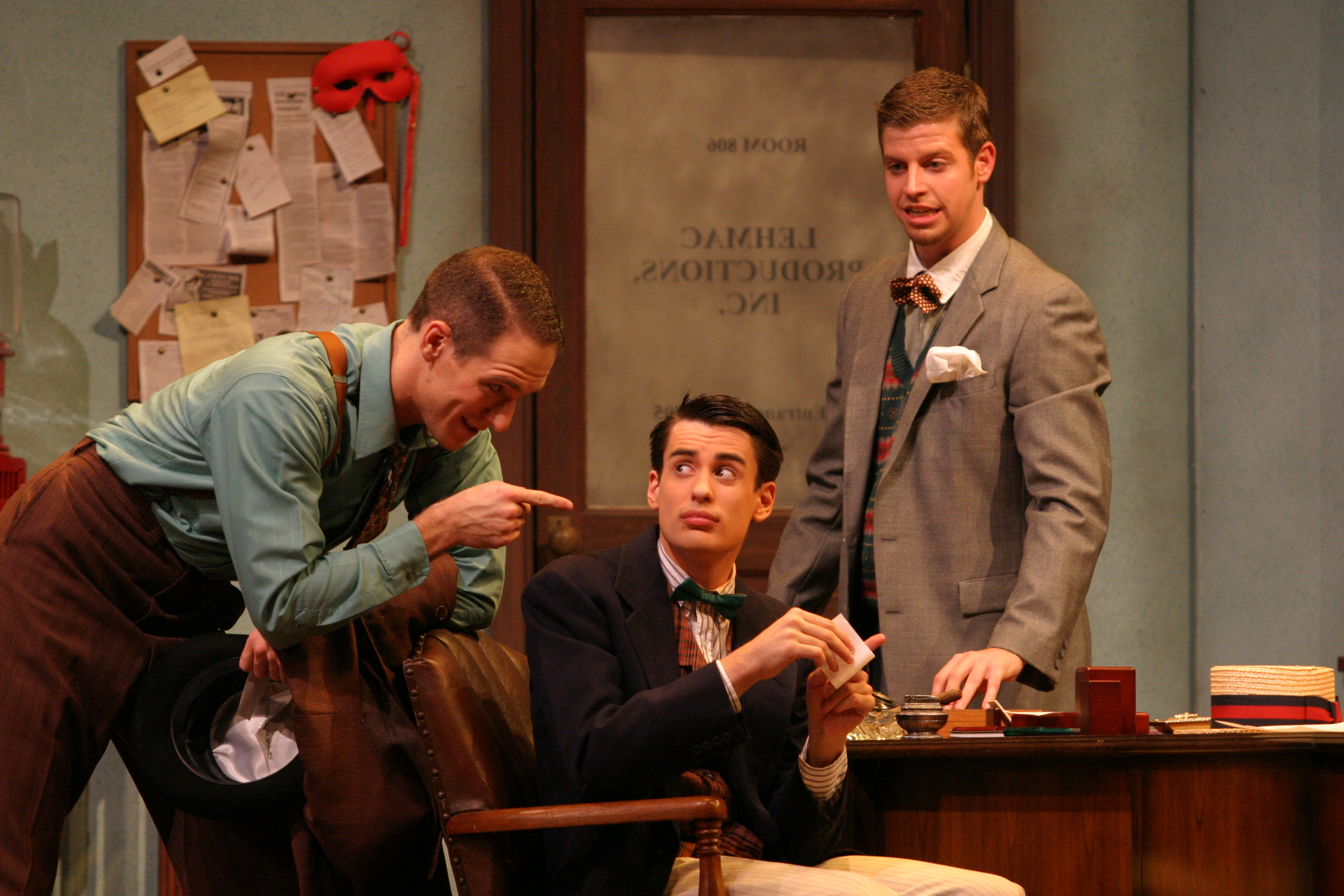
Scene from the 2003 production of The Butter and Egg Man at Otterbein University

Produced by Crosby Gaige, The Butter and Egg Man opened at the Longacre Theatre on September 23, 1925, and played for 243 performances. James Gleason directed the following cast:

- Gregory Kelly as Peter Jones
- Sylvia Field as Jane Weston
- Robert Middlemass as Joe Lehman
- Lucile Webster as Fanny Lehman
- John A. Butler as Jack McClure
- Marion Barney as Mary Martin
- Tom Fadden as A Waiter
- Harry Neville as Cecil Benham
- Harry Stubbs as Bernie Sampson
- Eloise Stream as Peggy Marlowe
- Puritan Townsend as Kitty Humphries
- Denman Maley as Oscar Fritchie
- George Alison as A.J. Patterson

When the Broadway run of the play ended in April 1926, Gregory Kelly starred in its national tour. Kelly had a heart attack in Pittsburgh in February 1927, and the tour was abandoned. Kelly was transferred to a New York City sanitarium by his wife, actress Ruth Gordon, but he was unable to recover and died July 9, 1927, at age 36.

The London premiere of The Butter and Egg Man took place August 27, 1927, at the Garrick Theatre. Presented by an American company, the play was performed 31 times, closing on September 27, 1927. Robert Middlemass reprised his Broadway role as Joe Lehman.

=== Revivals ===
Stagings of the play include Punch Line Theatre in Manhattan in 1982, and by the Off Broadway Atlantic Theater Company in 2002.

== Reception ==
New York critics were unanimous in their praise for The Butter and Egg Man. In his review of the play's premiere, Gilbert W. Gabriel wrote in The Sun that it was "the wittiest and liveliest jamboree of the behind-the-scenes ever distilled from the atmosphere of Broadway." Walter Winchell wrote that "first nighters roared at the dialogue". "The audience nearly laughed itself to death", wrote John Anderson of The New York Evening Post. Alexander Woollcott called the play "richly and continuously amusing". "If you like smart, funny, sentimental, satirical comedies, here is a chance to enjoy yourself", wrote Percy Hammond of the New York Herald Tribune.

== Adaptations ==
The Butter and Egg Man has been adapted for motion pictures six times:

- It was first adapted for the screen in 1928 (with the same name), a silent film directed by Richard Wallace.
- The 1932 American comedy film The Tenderfoot is based on the play.
- The 1935 British film Hello, Sweetheart is based on the play.
- The 1937 American film Dance Charlie Dance is based on the play.
- The 1940 American film An Angel from Texas, which included Ronald Reagan in its cast, is based on the play.
- The 1953 musical film Three Sailors and a Girl is based on the play.

P. G. Wodehouse adapted the play for his 1952 novel, Barmy in Wonderland. The novel, which appeared in Wodehouse's name, was dedicated to Kaufman, and Wodehouse split the profits from the novel 50/50 with Kaufman.
