= Betty Wragge =

American actress

Elizabeth Wragge
- Born: September 22, 1918; New York City, U.S.
- Died: October 2002 (aged 84)
- Other name: Betty Wragge
- Education: David Mannes School of Music
- Occupations: Actress, model
- Years active: 1921–c. 1960s
- Known for: Appearing in over 10,000 radio programs;
- Notable work: Mary and Bob's True Stories (Radio); Dead End (Broadway)

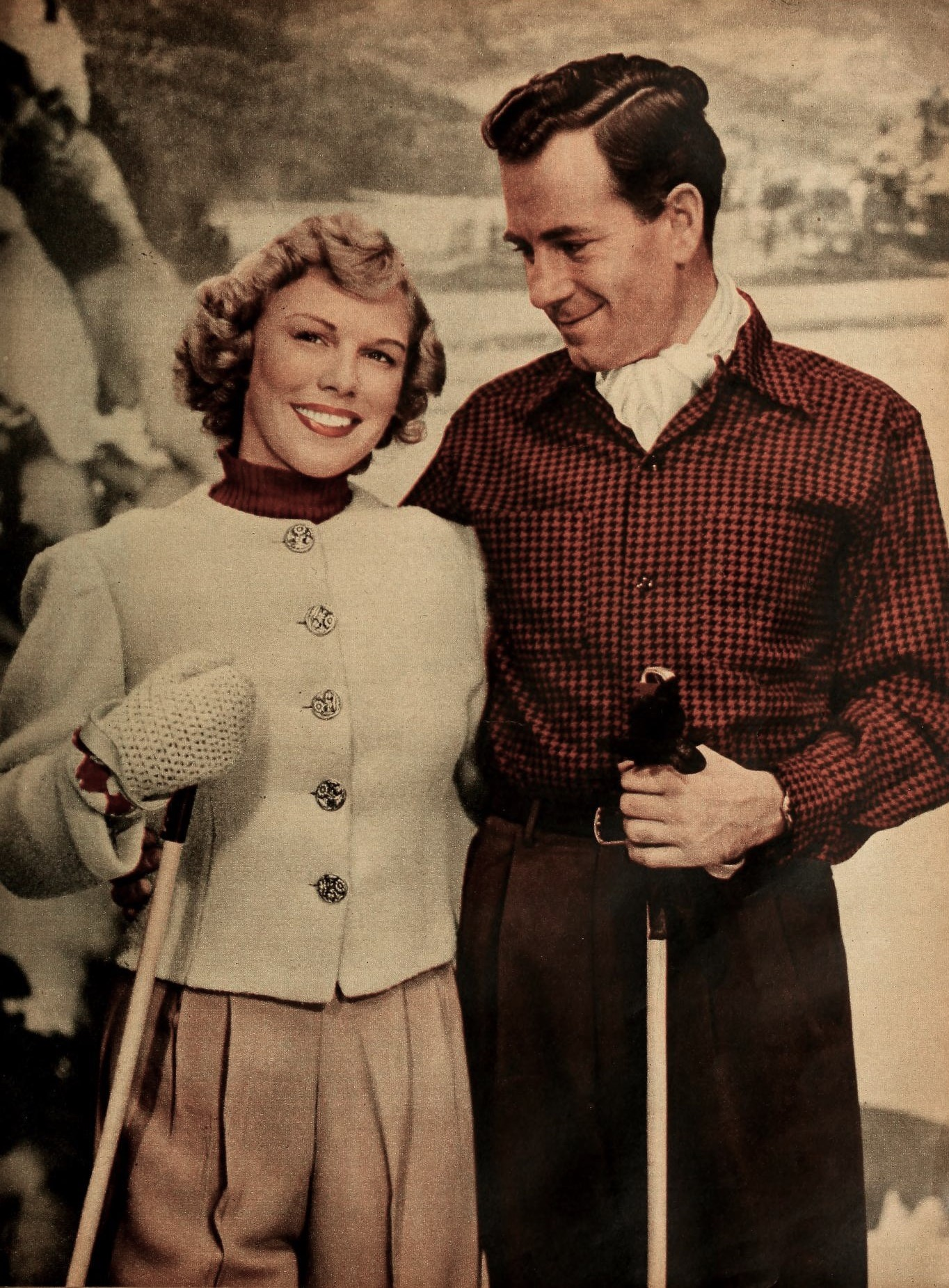
Betty Wragge with her husband Walter Brooke, 1953

Elizabeth Wragge (September 22, 1918 - October 2002) was an actress who appeared on more than 10,000 old-time radio programs in addition to working in other media. She was typically billed as Betty Wragge.

== Early years ==
Elizabeth Wragge was born in New York City. Her mother was a star in opera in Holland. Wragge graduated from the Professional Children's School, after which she attended the David Mannes School of Music. She was a model before she began working in radio.

== Radio ==
In 1927, Wragge appeared in Gold Spot Pals, an NBC program that may have been the first commercial program that used child actors. She also acted as a child on other programs, including Mary and Bob's True Stories, an anthology series on which she portrayed Mary. Perhaps her best known role on radio was portraying Peggy Young Trent, sister of the title character in the soap opera Pepper Young's Family. She also acted on other programs of that era, including Lux Radio Theatre, March of Time, Texaco Star Theatre, and We the People.

== Stage ==
Wragge's Broadway credits (billed as Elizabeth Wragge) included Up the Line (1926), The Silver Box (1927), and Dead End (1935). She also toured in musical troupes and acted in local and regional theaters, including the Allenberry Playhouse.

== Film ==
When she was three years old, Wragge acted in the silent film Yolanda. As an adult, she did dubbing for Italian films.

== Television ==
On television, Wragge had running parts on The Brighter Day, Love of Life, and The Secret Storm. She also appeared on Armstrong Circle Theatre, and in the "Flight Thirteen" episode of Fireside Theatre on January 2, 1951.

== Personal life ==
In January 1951, Wragge married actor Walter Brooke. They had two children, Thomas Brooke and Christina Brooke.
