= Wesley Jukes =

American glassblower (1870s–1880s)

Wesley L. Jukes (fl. 1870s–1880s) was a glassblower and mechanic who worked for P. T. Barnum.

== Biography ==
Jukes was born in Pittsburgh, Pennsylvania, and educated as a glassblower. Together with a Major Brunell, he founded museums in New Orleans and Indianapolis. He also manufactured automata for the circus of John Robinson.

In 1870, Jukes was working at Wood's Museum in New York City, where he met P. T. Barnum. Barnum hired Jukes for $250 a week to manufacture and maintain automata for his museum. There, Jukes created mechanical figures including the Dying Zouave, the Magic Drummer, Sleeping Beauty, and the Lord's Last Supper. Jukes also built many pipe organs for Barnum and others, sometimes with accompanying automaton bands.
