= Harrison Boyd Summers =

American historian

Harrison Boyd Summers (1894–1980) was a broadcast historian and educator who conducted audience surveys of radio listeners.

After several years as an advance man for the Chautauqua circuit, Summers was awarded a Ph.D. in economics from the University of Missouri in 1931. His first academic post was at Kansas State College (now University) where in 1937 he began conducting large-scale radio audience surveys.

He soon joined the industry he had been studying, holding positions in New York City radio and serving as a member of the Radio Research Council (1937–46). He was director of public service programs for NBC's Eastern Division from 1939 to 1942 and manager of the public service division of the Blue Network (later American Broadcasting Company) from 1942 to 1946.

In 1946, Summers joined Ohio State University's speech communication program where his teaching and research centered on station and network programming, policy and regulation of broadcasting, and audience research.

== Works ==
- Radio Censorship (H.W. Wilson, 1939, reprinted by Arno Press, 1971)
- A Thirty-Year History of Programs Carried on National Radio Networks in the United States, 1926-1956 (Ohio State University, 1958; reprinted by Arno Press, 1971).
- Broadcasting and the Public (Wadsworth, 1966), an introductory survey text, with his son, Robert.
- Unicameralism in Practice: The Nebraska Legislative System (The H. W. Wilson Co., 1937)
- The Railroad problem
