= Mary Jane Higby =

American actress (1909–1986)

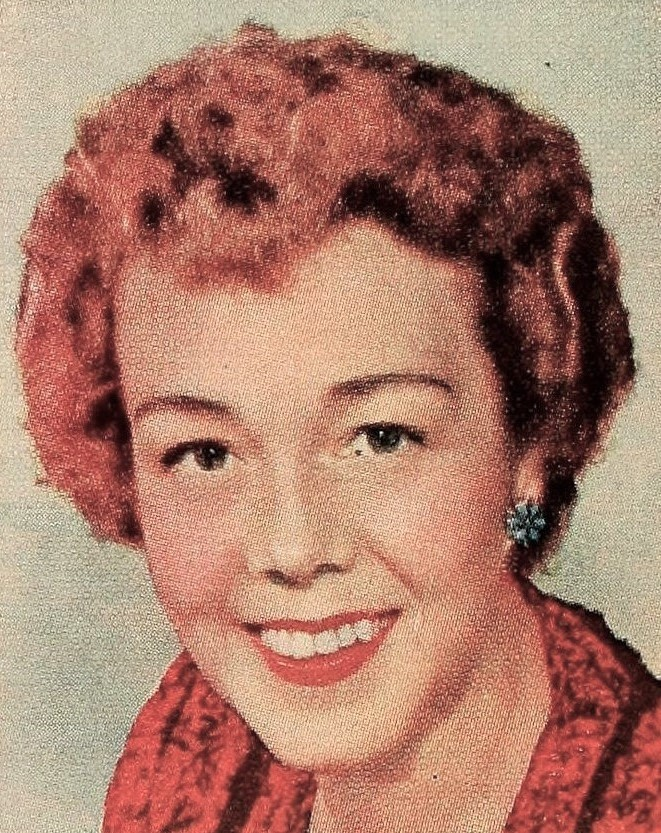
- Higby in 1953
- Born: May 29, 1909; St. Louis, Missouri, U.S.
- Died: February 1, 1986 (aged 76); New York City, New York, U.S.
- Occupation: Actress
- Known for: Playing female lead in When a Girl Marries on radio
- Spouse: Guy Sorel (January 13, 1945 - ?)

Mary Jane Higby (May 29, 1909 – February 1, 1986) was an American actress in the era of old-time radio and the early years of television. She is best known for her 18 years in the leading role on When a Girl Marries.

== Early years ==
The daughter of vaudevillian parents, Mr. and Mrs. Wilbur Higby (known professionally as the Higby Players) Mary Jane Higby was born in St. Louis, Missouri, "between a matinee and an evening performance." According to a newspaper photograph's caption, "literally she was carried on the stage by her theatrical parents as a prop when she was only 2."

Perhaps her earliest public performance occurred when she was 5 years old. An article in the St. Louis Post-Dispatch in 1914 listed Higby as one of "a number of helpful children [who] will give a performance for the benefit of the Post-Dispatch Pure Milk and Free Ice Fund." A later article cited Higby as one of two "little performers" who were "brought out repeatedly for their excellent work."

== Radio ==
Higby's radio debut came in 1932 "in singing and dramatic roles." In 1936, she played Desdemona in a production of Shakespeare's Othello on KECA in Los Angeles, California. She also participated in network radio that year as a part of the cast of Death Rides the Highways on NBC.

Higby's signature role was portraying Joan Davis, the female lead on When a Girl Marries, a part she played for 18 years. Her other roles in radio programs included Cynthia in The Romance of Helen Trent and various supporting parts in Perry Mason

Higby was also in the cast of Joe Palooka, John's Other Wife, Joyce Jordan, Girl Interne, The Listening Post, Mary Marlin, Parties at Pickfair, Stella Dallas and This Is Nora Drake.

In the 1970s, Higby once again appeared on network radio, acting in episodes of CBS Radio Mystery Theater.

== Television ==
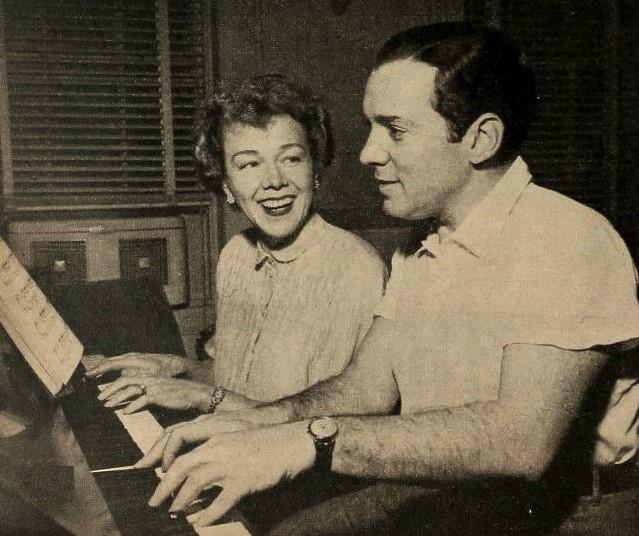
Mary Jane Higby with her husband Guy Sorel in 1953

Higby appeared in We, the People.

== Film ==
Higby "had a Hollywood career as a child actress," primarily acting in silent films for which her father was the director. As an adult, looking back on her cinematic experience as a child, Higby said, "... the movies frightened me. I was, it seems, always being kidnaped, riding runaway horses or, generally speaking, being yanked around."

As an adult, Higby appeared in The Honeymoon Killers.

== Book ==
In 1968, Cowles Publishing Company published Tune in Tomorrow, Higby's account of her life in radio's golden age. A reviewer called the book "a fast, bouncy, information-loaded" description of the era—one that focused on "actors, actresses, sponsors, engineers, agents, writers, sound men, on everything and everybody who made pre-TV radio tick" rather than on herself.

== Personal life ==
Higby married actor Guy Sorel on January 13, 1945, in New York City, New York.
