= Michael Fitzmaurice (actor) =

American radio actor (1908–1967)

Michael T. Fitzmaurice
- Born: April 28, 1908; Chicago, Illinois, U.S.
- Died: August 31, 1967 (aged 59); New York City, U.S.
- Education: University of Dublin
- Occupations: Actor, radio announcer
- Spouse: Frances McPherrin

Michael Fitzmaurice (April 28, 1908 – August 31, 1967) was a radio actor, best known for his portrayal of Superman.

== Early years ==
Born in Chicago, Fitzmaurice was the son of Leonard Fitzmaurice and Hettie Kenton. His father was a singer, and his mother "was known as the youngest serpentine dancer in the United States [and] later worked in radio." His great-grandfather was Wesley Jukes, who Fitzmaurice said created the Cardiff Giant hoax for P.T. Barnum.

He graduated from the University of Dublin. He intended to join the British diplomatic corps, but followed the advice of Noël Coward to try acting.

== Journalism ==
Fitzmaurice was a reporter for the Los Angeles Times before becoming a newsman at KNX radio in Los Angeles, California. While at KNX, he used the name Mike Kelly on the air.

== Stage ==
Fitzmaurice's stage debut came in London with the Harry Lonsdell troupe when he was 20.

== Radio ==
In 1935, Fitzmaurice left KNX and began "announcing remote control dance programs for CBS, keyed through KHJ, Los Angeles."

The baritone-voiced Fitzmaurice was heard often on radio dramas during the 1940s as both announcer and actor. From 1944 to 1947, he was the host of Mutual's Quiz of Two Cities. He was the announcer for Tales of Fatima, The Right to Happiness, Land of the Lost and Nick Carter, Master Detective. On June 5, 1950, he took over the title role on ABC's The Adventures of Superman, providing voices for both Clark Kent and Superman until the series came to an end. He was heard as Superman for a total of 78 broadcasts.

Blackhawk was a 1950 ABC radio series adapted from the long-run Blackhawk comic book about the team of adventurous World War II aviators. With Fitzmaurice portraying team leader Blackhawk, the series premiered September 13, 1950 and concluded a few months later on December 27, 1950. He also was the Hawk on the adventure serial The Sparrow and the Hawk.

Fitzmaurice was a regular on several soap operas. He played Jimmie Kent on Myrt and Marge, and he also appeared on Joyce Jordan, M.D., When a Girl Marries and Pepper Young's Family. He played Dr. Baxter on Her Honor, Nancy James, Captain Bob Hastings on This Life Is Mine and Dick Grosvenor on Stella Dallas.

== Film ==
Fitzmaurice signed a contract with Universal Studios in 1937. He "appeared in a half-dozen B-movie productions." They were The Plough and the Stars (1936), The House of a Thousand Candles (1936), A Girl with Ideas (1937), Reported Missing (1937), Night Key (1937), and Fourteen Hours (1951).

== Newsreels ==
In addition to his radio work, Fitzmaurice was narrator of the Hearst-MGM News of the Day newsreel shown in movie theaters.

== Personal life ==
Fitzmaurice was married to Frances McPherrin, and later to a wife whose first name was Lucille.

== Death ==
Fitzmaurice died of lymphoma at Memorial Hospital in New York August 30, 1967. (Another source says August 31, 1967.) He was survived by his wife, Lucille, and two children.

== See also ==
- List of old-time radio people
- List of radio soaps

== Sources ==
- Cox, Jim. Historical Dictionary of American Radio Soap Operas, Scarecrow Press, 2005.
