= Elaine Sterne Carrington =

American dramatist (1891–1958)

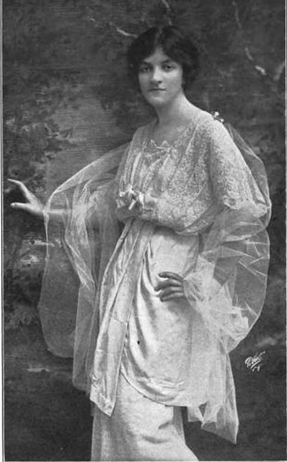
- Elaine Sterne, from a 1917 publication.
- Born: Elaine Sterne; June 14, 1891; New York, New York, U.S.
- Died: May 4, 1958 (aged 66); New York, New York, U.S.
- Occupations: Screenwriter; playwright; novelist; short story author; radio soap opera writer
- Spouse(s): George Dart Carrington (m. 1920-1945; his death; 2 children)
- Writing career
- Language: English

Elaine Sterne Carrington (June 14, 1891 – May 4, 1958) was an American screenwriter, playwright, novelist and short story author who found her greatest success writing for radio. Carrington originated radio soap opera in 1932, and wrote more than 12,000 daily dramas during her long career. At one time she wrote three separate shows — Pepper Young's Family, When a Girl Marries and Rosemary — that each ran five times a week.

== Life and career ==
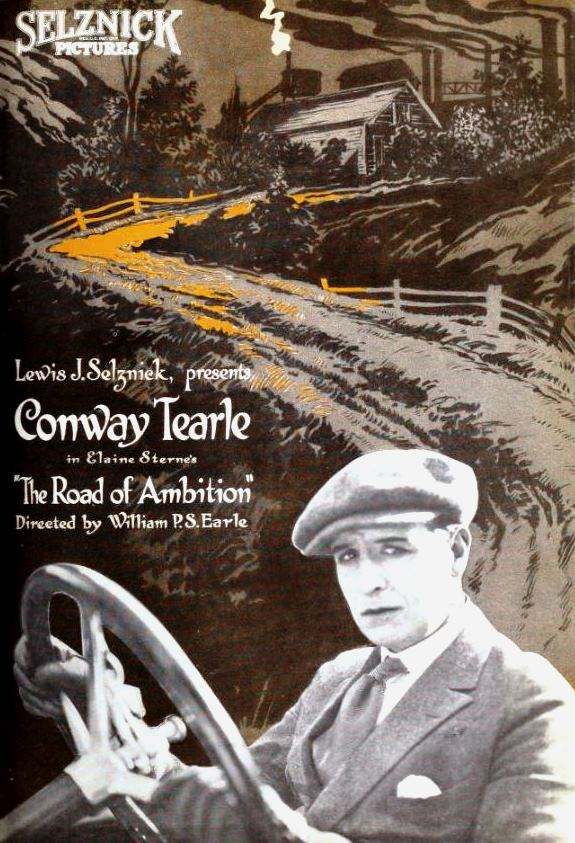
Poster for the Selznick Pictures film The Road of Ambition (1920)

Elaine Sterne was born in Manhattan, New York City, the daughter of Marie Louise Henriques and Theodore Sterne, an importer of tobacco. Sterne was educated at Columbia University. In 1920, she married attorney George Dart Carrington, whom she met in grade school. They lived in Brooklyn Heights with children, Patricia and Robert. George died in 1945.

She began writing films in 1913, and her scenario for The Sins of the Mothers (1914) won first prize in a contest sponsored by The New York Evening Sun and Vitagraph Studios. By 1930 she had 50 screenwriting credits — including one for Alibi, the 1929 adaptation of her 1927 Broadway play, Nightstick, which she wrote with J. C. Nugent, Elliott Nugent and John Wray. She also wrote several one-act vaudeville plays including A Good Provider (1928), The Red Hat, Five Minutes from the Station, and Fear.

Elaine Sterne's first published story, "The King of the Christmas Feast," appeared in the December 1914 issue of St. Nicholas Magazine. By the time she was in her 20s her fiction appeared in popular magazines including Collier's, Good Housekeeping, Harper's Magazine, Pictorial Review, Redbook, The Saturday Evening Post and Woman's Home Companion. She also wrote novels, including The Road to Ambition (1917) and The Gypsy Star (1936), and she collected some of her short fiction in the 1939 book, All Things Considered.

Carrington's writing career was transformed in 1932, when a friend persuaded her to approach the National Broadcasting Company about trying a dramatic serial on radio. Starring Burgess Meredith, the 15-minute drama Red Adams ran three days a week (October 2, 1932 – January 22, 1933). When it found a new sponsor it was renamed Red Davis (October 2, 1933 – May 24, 1935).

"It was put on five days a week and became an enormous hit with housewives whose attentions could be diverted from the tedium of housekeeping," wrote The New York Times in 1958. "The program changed sponsors again — this time to a soap company — and it became the famous Pepper Young's Family, for which Mrs. Carrington at her death was still writing five fifteen-minute programs a week."

Carrington created a second serial drama, When a Girl Marries (1939–1957), and a third, Rosemary (1944–1955) — requiring her to produce about 38,000 words a week. In 1946 she was earning $200,000 a year.

In 1946 she created The Carrington Playhouse, a radio show that produced original plays that won its weekly contest. She also wrote patriotic scripts for the U.S. government during World War II, and after the war wrote dramas for Robert Montgomery Presents and other television programs.

Carrington's full-length plays include Remember Me? (1953), Maggie, Pack Your Bags (1954), and The Empress, a 1955 comedy that was presented in Westport, Connecticut, with Geraldine Page.

== Death ==
Pepper Young's Family continued for a year after Carrington's death on May 4, 1958. She died at New York Hospital at age 66, after a brief illness.

"No one ever came close to Mrs. Carrington's formidable output," reported The New York Times, "and in the world of radio the plump, pleasant, mink-clad author was universally known as 'the Queen of the Soapers.'"
