= Steve Gunderson (disambiguation) =

Steve Gunderson (born 1951) is an American executive and politician from Wisconsin.

Steve Gunderson may also refer to:

- Steve Gunderson (actor), American actor
- Steve Gunderson (Montana politician) (born 1957), American politician from Montana
