= Warren Steibel =

American film director

Warren Steibel (1925–2002) was an American producer and director. He worked in the television and film industry throughout his career, and is perhaps best remembered for his long friendship with William F. Buckley Jr., both of whom collaborated on the production of Firing Line from April 1966 until its final broadcast at the end of 1999.

Although the liberal Steibel was not always in accord with Buckley's conservative political beliefs, the two had an amicable and creative working relationship, and produced one of the longest-running television programs in the history of PBS.

In addition to Firing Line, Steibel is credited with producing another topical debate program, Debates, Debates, which was created in 1996 and was distributed by another non-profit production company of his creation, Four Score and Ten.

Steibel also worked for each of the "Big Three" television networks in various capacities. He experienced a less successful career as a Hollywood producer, producing the independent film The Honeymoon Killers in 1970. The film was written and eventually directed by Steibel's business partner, Opera Composer Leonard Kastle, in order to save costs and to rescue the film after the firing of initial director, Martin Scorsese.

Steibel was an "agnostic Jew".

After battling liver cancer Steibel died on January 3, 2002.
