= Robin Johnson =

American actress

- Born: May 29, 1964 (age 61); Park Slope, Brooklyn, New York City
- Occupation: Actress
- Years active: 1980-1997

Robin Johnson (born May 29, 1964) is an American actress. Johnson grew up in Park Slope, Brooklyn, New York City. She graduated from Brooklyn Technical High School in 1982.

== Career ==
In connection with her role in Times Square, Robin Johnson signed an exclusive three-year contract with the Robert Stigwood Organization, with the understanding that RSO would develop film and music projects for her. RSO intended to market Johnson as "the female John Travolta," and her contract legally barred her from accepting offers or auditions from rival companies. Johnson therefore turned down calls from agents, producers and casting directors, but the projects that RSO promised her never came to fruition. Johnson took a job as a bank teller whilst waiting for her RSO contract to expire, and by the time it did, there were no offers for work. Johnson did some minor film and TV roles, but by the late 1980s, she gave up on acting and got a job as a traffic reporter on KFWB-AM a Los Angeles radio station. Robin Johnson contributed to the audio commentary with director Alan Moyle, which features on the 2000 DVD release of Times Square.

== Filmography ==
Film
Year	Title	Role	Notes
1980	Times Square	Nicky Marotta	
1982	Splitz	Gina Napoliani	
1983	Baby It's You	Joann	
1985	After Hours	Punk Girl	
1988	D.O.A.	Cookie Fitzwaring	
Television
Year	Title	Role	Notes
1984-1985, 1988	Guiding Light	Darcy Dekker	(1984-1985, 1988)
1985	Miami Vice	Candy James	Season 1 - Golden Triangle
1985	Code Name: Foxfire	Danny O'Toole	8 episodes

== Theatre ==
- 1997: An Unhappy Woman, Moving Arts Theatre, Los Angeles
