= Shirley Stoler =

American actress

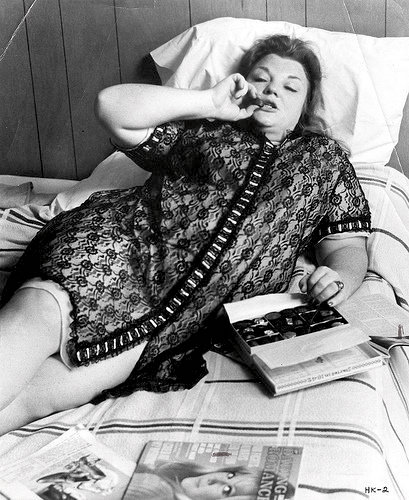
- Stoler in The Honeymoon Killers
- Born: March 30, 1929; Brooklyn, New York, U.S.
- Died: February 17, 1999 (aged 69); Manhattan, New York, U.S.
- Occupation: Actress
- Years active: 1970–1999

Shirley Stoler (March 30, 1929 – February 17, 1999) was an American actress best known for her roles in The Honeymoon Killers (1970) and Lina Wertmüller's Seven Beauties (1975).

== Early years ==
The eldest of four children born to Russian Jewish immigrant parents in Brooklyn who owned a used furniture store, Stoler made her stage debut in 1955 and gained experience as a member of New York's experimental La Mama and Living Theatre companies. She had become a key underground player by the time she earned film fame in 1970 at age 41.

== Film and TV career ==
Throughout her career, Stoler, a large and powerfully built woman who rarely smiled onscreen, often played scary villains in such films as Seven Beauties and The Honeymoon Killers and on television in an episode of Charlie's Angels. A character actress, as well as an occasional lead, Stoler appeared in small roles in Klute, The Deer Hunter, and Desperately Seeking Susan.

A highlight of her film career was her performance as the unnamed Nazi female prison commandant in Lina Wertmüller's Seven Beauties (1975), in which she played a cat-and-mouse game of seduction with the concentration camp inmate played by Giancarlo Giannini. A profile of Stoler was featured on the front page of the New York Times Arts section.

The film was nominated for an Academy Award for Best Foreign Language Film of 1976, and Wertmüller received nominations for Best Director (a first for a woman) and Best Original Screenplay; Stoler's co-star Giannini was nominated for Best Actor.

Stoler also appeared on Broadway; in the daytime soap operas The Edge of Night as Frankie and One Life to Live as Roberta (nicknamed "Tiny"); and on Saturday morning television as Mrs. Steve on Pee-wee's Playhouse.

Tim Lucas speculated she was actually Shirley Kilpatrick, changing her name after the filming of The Astounding She-Monster (1958).

== Death ==
Stoler lived in Manhattan, where she died at St. Vincent's Hospital and Medical Center from heart failure after a long illness, aged 69.

== Filmography ==
Year	Title	Role	Notes
1970	The Honeymoon Killers	Martha Beck	
1971	Klute	Momma Reese	
1975	Seven Beauties	Commandant	Italian title: Pasqualino Settebellezze
1976	A Real Young Girl	Grocer in Aupom	French title: Une vraie jeune fille
1977	The Liberation of Honeydoll Jones	Verna Jones	Uncredited
1977	The Displaced Person	Mrs. Shortley	
1978	The Deer Hunter	Steven's Mother	
1979	Charlie's Angels	Big Aggie	Episode: "Caged Angel"
1980	Skag	Dottie Jessup	5 episodes
1980	Seed of Innocence	Corky	Alternative title: Teen Mothers
1980	Below the Belt	Trish	
1980	The Edge of Night	Frankie	Unknown episodes
1981	Second-Hand Hearts	Maxy	
1982	Splitz	Dean Hunta	
1983	The Brass Ring	Marge	Television movie
1983	Bring 'Em Back Alive		Episode: "The Shadow Women of Chung Tai"
1983	The Powers of Matthew Star	Tattoo Artist	Episode: "The Quadrian Caper"
1984	A Stroke of Genius		
1985	Desperately Seeking Susan	Jail Matron	
1985	Brass	Woman in window	Television movie
1986-1987	Pee-wee's Playhouse	Mrs. Steve	7 episodes
1986-1987	One Life to Live	Roberta "Tiny" Coleman	Unknown episodes
1987	Three O'Clock High	Eva	
1988	Shakedown	Irma	
1988	Sticky Fingers	Reeba	
1989	Kate & Allie		Episode: "Wanted: One Husband"
1989	In the Heat of the Night	Adah Boone	Episode: "The Pig Woman of Sparta"
1990	Frankenhooker	Spike the Bartender	
1990	Miami Blues	Edie Wulgemuth	
1990	Sons	German housewife	
1991	Law & Order	Charlie Maylen	Episode: "Misconception"
1991	Age Isn't Everything		
1992	Topsy and Bunker: The Cat Killers	Grace	
1992	Mac	Customer	
1992	Malcolm X	Mrs. Swerlin	
1993	Me and Veronica	Shouting Woman	
1995	Grumpier Old Men	Organist at wedding	Uncredited
1997	The Deli	Irma	
2016	Chief Zabu	Joan Ironwood	Shot in 1986, (final film role)
