= Raymond Serra =

American actor

- Born: Aurelio Lacagnina; August 13, 1936; New York City, New York, U.S.
- Died: June 20, 2003 (aged 66); Staten Island, New York, U.S.
- Years active: 1974–2003
- Spouse: Gayle Kaizer (?–2003; his death)
- Children: 4

Raymond Serra (born Aurelio Lacagnina; August 13, 1936 – June 20, 2003) was an American character actor known for his many supporting roles in theater, film, and television over a 30-year career.

== Early life and education ==
Born in Little Italy, New York City, Serra later moved to Staten Island, while also performing on the violin at Carnegie Hall when he was only eight years old. He attended Wagner College, and pursued an acting career.

== Career ==
In addition to his film and television work, Serra wrote and performed in Manny (1979), a biographical drama about Edward G. Robinson. He also appeared in Momma's Little Angels by Louis LaRusso II (1978) as the family doctor, Carillo. Serra's other stage performances include, Marlow a musical by Leo Rost (1981), Accidental Death of an Anarchist by Dario Fo (1984), Legs Diamond a musical comedy by Harvey Fierstein (1988), and 3 from Brooklyn a musical by Sandi Merle (1992) as Cosmo the Cabbie.

== Personal life ==
He and his wife, Gayle, had four children.

== Filmography ==
=== Films ===
Year	Title	Role	Notes
1974	The Gambler	Benny	Minor character
1974	The Switch or How to Alter Your Ego	Ralph White	Major character
1975	Dog Day Afternoon	New York Plainclothes Cop	Uncredited
1976	Marathon Man	Truck Driver	
1976	The Death Collector	Doctor	
1977	Hooch	Vinnie	
1977	Contract on Cherry Street	Jimmy Monks	
1979	Voices	Track Regular	
1979	Manhattan	Pizzeria Waiter	
1980	Fighting Back	Tony Parisi	
1981	Bolero		
1981	Arthur	Racetrack Owner	
1981	Wolfen	Detective	
1981	Bill	Harry	
1982	Splitz	Vito Napoliani	
1982	Vigilante	Court Officer	
1984	Alphabet City	Gino	
1985	The Purple Rose of Cairo	Hollywood Executive	
1985	Prizzi's Honor	Bocca	
1985	Stone Pillow	Stan	
1987	Forever, Lulu	Alphonse	
1987	The Ghost Valley	Dara's Father	
1987	A Time to Remember	Frank Villano	
1988	Alone in the Neon Jungle	Sgt. Sal Ruby	
1990	Teenage Mutant Ninja Turtles	Chief Sterns	
1991	Teenage Mutant Ninja Turtles II: The Secret of the Ooze	Chief Sterns	
1994	Sugar Hill	Sal Marconi	
1994	The Silence of the Hams	Agent Prostitute #1	
1996	Gotti	Frank LoCascio	
1998	Safe Men	Barber	
1998	Shepherd	Father Rizzo	
1998	Men of Means	Tommy C.	
1999	18 Shades of Dust	Goon #3	
2000	Wannabes	Uncle Tommy	
2001	Mafioso: The Father, the Son	Don Salvatore	
2003	Dead Canaries	Sammy Caso	
2003	Mail Order Bride	Robber	
2004	Our Italian Husband	Copy Shop Owner	
2010	Hot Ice, No-one Is Safe	Charlie the Bullet	Final film role

=== Television ===
Year	Title	Role	Notes
1976	The Practice	Harry	1 episode
1976	Mary Hartman, Mary Hartman	Joe Sweeney	1 episode
1977	Kojak	Al Gregorio	1 episode
1981–1982	The Edge of Night	Eddie Lorimar	103 episodes
1982	Love, Sidney	John	1 episode
1982	Powerhouse	Lt. Al Gambrino	1 episode
1983	Archie Bunker's Place	Marty Marquetti	1 episode
1986	Spenser: For Hire	Joe Broz	2 episodes
1984–1986	American Playhouse	Callas / J. Edgar Hoover	2 episodes
1986	Crime Story	Noah Ganz	2 episodes
1987	The Equalizer	Antonio	Episode: "Carnal Persuasion"
1987	CBS Summer Playhouse	Carmine	Episode: "The Saint in Manhattan" (S1.E1)
1990	True Blue		1 episode
1991	Who's the Boss?	Gus Stone	1 episode
1991	Murphy Brown	Building Superintendent	1 episode
1992	Matlock	Jay Cutler	1 episode
1992	Nurses	Officer Torres	1 episode
1993	Knots Landing	Deputy	1 episode
1993	Reasonable Doubts	Eddie Novak	1 episode
1993	The Young Indiana Jones Chronicles	Colosimo	1 episode
1993	Murder, She Wrote	Ben Eigers	1 episode
1993	Marilyn & Bobby: Her Final Affair	Sam Giancana	Television film
2001	The Job	Man in Store	1 episode
