= Code Name: Foxfire =

American action-adventure television series (1985)

- Genre: Action-adventure
- Created by: Richard Chapman; Bill Dial; Joel Schumacher
- Starring: Joanna Cassidy; John McCook; Sheryl Lee Ralph; Robin Johnson; Henry Jones
- Theme music composer: Joe Sample
- Composer: Jeff Sturges
- Country of origin: United States
- Original language: English
- No. of seasons: 1
- No. of episodes: 8

Production
- Executive producers: Richard Chapman; Bill Dial; Joel Schumacher
- Running time: 60 minutes
- Production company: Universal Television

Original release
- Network: NBC
- Release: January 27 – April 26, 1985

Code Name: Foxfire is an hour-long American action-adventure television series that ran on NBC from January to April 1985 about a group of three female operatives, secretly working on behalf of the president of the United States.

== Cast ==
- Joanna Cassidy as Elizabeth "Foxfire" Towne
- John McCook as Larry Hutchins
- Sheryl Lee Ralph as Maggie Bryan
- Robin Johnson as Danny O'Toole
- Henry Jones as Phillips

== Episodes ==
No.	Title	Directed by	Written by	Original release date	Prod. code
1 2	"Slay It Again, Sam"	Corey Allen	Richard Chapman, Bill Dial, Joel Schumacher	January 27, 1985	83513
Two-hour pilot.
3	"Tell Me That You Love Me"	Tom Wright	Richard Chapman, Bill Dial	February 8, 1985	59901
The presidents of five banks have been taken hostage. Three secret agents, operating under the code name Foxfire, try to find out what happened to the security staff in charge of the presidents.
4	"La Paloma"	Alan Cooke	David E. Peckinpah	February 15, 1985	59902
The three ladies have to guard a South-American president who's visiting the US.
5	"That Old Familiar Face"	Tom Wright	Rob Gilmer	February 22, 1985	59904
The wife of a famous scientist has doubts about the identity of her husband. She thinks something happened during his trip to a hospital.
6	"Pick a Hero, Any Hero"	Michael Hamilton	Jill Sherman Donner	March 8, 1985	59908
A waitress overhears a conversation about the delivery of weapons and now her life is in danger. Liz Towne and her team try to track her down before anyone else does.
7	"Robin's Egg Blues"	Allen Reisner	George Geiger	March 15, 1985	59903
Elizabeth Towne gets romantically involved with a jewel thief in order to get her hands on a stolen diamond. The diamond contains secret info from Russia, which is why a Russian agent is tailing her.
8	"Goodbye, Mr. Microchips"	Roy Campanella II	Tom Ropelewski	March 22, 1985	59911
A student from the Wendell Academy stumbled upon some secrets from a project by the American air force.
9	"Send Me No Orchids"	Allen Reisner	Steve Stoliar	April 26, 1985	59907
The Black Orchid, the most dangerous woman in the world, is out to get Liz.

Episodes information is taken from IMDB and The Classic TV Archive.
