= Back to Bacharach and David =

Back To Bacharach and David is an Off-Broadway revue that featured the songs of Burt Bacharach and Hal David in a show created by Steve Gunderson and Kathy Najimy and directed by Najimy, with musical arrangements and orchestrations by Gunderson. The revue comprises the Bacharach/David songs from 1960–1970.

== Production history ==
The show originally had a limited run at Steve McGraw's Club in New York City in September 1992 and starred Gunderson, Melinda Gilb, Susan Mosher and Carla Renata Williams. It workshopped with Alice Ripley and Lillias White. The show then ran at "Club 53" in New York City from March 11, 1993 through September 11, 1993, with Gunderson, Gilb, Mosher and White.

The revue was produced by the North Coast Repertory Theatre in San Diego in August 2006 with Gunderson and Gilb in a production directed by original choreographer Javier Velasco, and was attended by Burt Bacharach himself, and later by Hal David, who had been a supporter of the show during its original Off Broadway run.

The revue was produced at the Music Box in Los Angeles, California, from April 19 through May 17, 2009. Directed by Najimy, the cast featured "American Idol" finalist Diana DeGarmo, "American Idol" contestant Tom Lowe, Tressa Thomas and Susan Mosher. The show was revised and includes two songs not previously featured, including "What's New Pussycat," for DeGarmo.

Another revue featuring the works of Bacharach and David, The Look of Love, was produced on Broadway in 2003.

== Concept and songs ==
There is no narrative.

Songs include "A House is Not A Home", "Alfie," "Always Something There to Remind Me", "Another Night," "Any Old Time of the Day," "Anyone Who Had a Heart," "April Fools," "Are You There With Another Girl," "Close to You," "Do You Know the Way to San Jose," "Don't Make Me Over," "I Just Have to Breathe," "I Say a Little Prayer for You," "I'll Never Fall in Love Again," "Just Don't Know What to Do With Myself," "Knowing When to Leave," "Let Me Be Lonely," "Let Me Go to Him," "The Look of Love," "Message to Michael", "My Little Red Book," "Nikki," "One Less Bell to Answer," "Promises, Promises," "Raindrops Keep Fallin' on My Head," "Reach Out for Me," "This Empty Place," "This Guy's in Love With You," "Trains and Boats and Planes," "24 Hours from Tulsa," "Walk on By," "What the World Needs Now Is Love," "Whoever You Are I Love You," and "You'll Never Get to Heaven."

== Critical response ==
Stephen Holden in The New York Times review of the 1993 production wrote: "Ms. Najimy has staged many songs as comic tableaux in a frenetic teen-age soap opera. Decked out in such tacky vintage paraphernalia as peace symbols, chain belts and go-go boots, the show's four performers...emote them with the sobby fervency of a high school clique having a collective hormone attack. What lifts "Back to Bacharach and David" above run-of-the-mill 60's nostalgia is the show's nearly perfect balance between tribute and comedy."
