= Tom McCleister =

American actor (born 1949)

- Born: Thomas McLeister; May 26, 1949 (age 77); New York City, U.S.
- Other names: Thom McCleister; Thom McLeister
- Occupation: Actor
- Years active: 1982–2006

Thomas McCleister (born May 26, 1949) is an American actor who is perhaps best known for his role as Ike on Married... with Children. McCleister also played the part of Kolos on the series Star Trek: Deep Space Nine, appearing in the episode "Q-Less". He has made guest appearances on such shows as NYPD Blue, Roswell, Angel, Matlock, Jake and the Fatman, Diagnosis Murder, and Providence. His motion picture credits include Midnight Run (1988), a supporting role in the box-office smash Arnold Schwarzenegger-Danny DeVito film Twins (1988), Crazy in Alabama (1999), and Grand Theft Parsons (2003). In 2004 he portrayed a lawyer in Clint Eastwood's Academy Award winning drama Million Dollar Baby.

== Selected filmography ==
- Splitz (1982) .... Warwick
- The American Snitch (1983) .... Shapiro
- Hard Choices (1985) .... Blinky
- Matlock (TV Series) .... Metro Cop

- Episode: "The Don: Part 1" (1986)
- Episode: "The Don: Part 2" (1986)

- Hill Street Blues (TV Series)

- Episode: "Der Roachenkavalier" (1987) .... First Bum

- Hunter (TV Series)

- Episode: "Hot Pursuit: Part 1" (1987) .... Jim Gleary

- Newhart (TV Series)

- Episode: "Take Me to Your Loudon" (1987) .... Party Attendee

- Mama's Family (TV Series)

- Episode: "Bed and Breakdown" (1988) .... Ernie Carruthers (as Thom McCleister)

- Inherit the Wind (1988) .... Bailiff
- Midnight Run (1988) .... Bill 'Red' Wood (as Thom McCleister)
- Twins (1988) .... Bob Klane (as Thom McCleister)
- Hooperman (TV Series)

- Episode: "Intolerance" (1988) .... Bob (as Thom McCleister)

- Fletch Lives (1989) .... Klansman No. 2
- Murphy Brown (TV Series)

- Episode: "Nowhere to Run" (1988) .... Stagehand
- Episode: "The Strike" (1989) .... Dwayne (as Thom McLeister)

- Wings (TV Series)

- Episode: "Marriage, Italian Style" (1992) .... Fisherman (as Thom McCleister)
- Episode: "Divorce, American Style" (1992) .... Fisherman (as Thom McCleister)
- Episode: "Two Jerks and a Jill" (1992) .... Tom

- The Wonder Years (TV Series)

- Episode: "Ladies and Gentlemen... the Rolling Stones" (1993) .... Wally

- Star Trek: Deep Space Nine (TV Series)

- Episode: "Q-Less" (1993) .... Kolos

- Cop and a Half (1993) .... Rudy
- Blossom (TV Series)

- Episode: "Blossom's Dilemma" .... Prison Guard

- NYPD Blue (TV Series)

- Episode: "Personal Foul" .... Corrections Officer

- The Adventures of Brisco County, Jr. (TV Series)

- Episode: "Ned Zed" .... Morgan

- Midnight Runaround (1994, TV Movie) .... Hal Mooney
- Married... with Children (TV Series) .... Ike

- Episode: "A Man for No Seasons" (1994)
- Episode: "I Want My Psycho Dad: Part 1" (1994)
- Episode: "I Want My Psycho Dad: Second Blood: Part 2" (1994)
- Episode: "The Naked and the Dead, But Mostly the Naked" (1995)
- Episode: "And Bingo Was Her Game-O" (1995)
- Episode: "Pump Fiction" (1995)
- Episode: "A Shoe Room with a View" (1995)
- Episode: "Reverend Al" (1995)
- Episode: "How Bleen Was My Kelly" (1995)
- Episode: "Flight of the Bumblebee" (1995)
- Episode: "I Can't Believe It's Butter" (1995)
- Episode: "The Hood, the Bud & the Kelly: Part 2" (1996)
- Episode: "The Agony and the Extra C" (1996)
- Episode: "Bud Hits the Books" (1996)
- Episode: "The Joke's on Al" (1996)
- Episode: "Requiem for a Chevyweight: Part 2" (1996)
- Episode: "The Stepford Peg"
- Episode: "Live Nude Peg"

- Dream a Little Dream 2 (1995) .... Little Tim
- Nowhere Man (TV Series)

- Episode: "Shine a Light on You" (1996) .... Hank Bower

- The Pest (1997) .... Leo
- The Jeff Foxworthy Show (TV Series)

- Episode: "Field of Schemes" (1997) .... Hoss Phister

- Millennium (TV Series)

- Episode: "Through a Glass, Darkly" (1998) .... Max Brunell

- Home Improvement (TV Series)

- Episode: "The Long and Winding Road: Part 1" (1999) .... Butch

- Buddy Boy (1999) .... Mr. Jones
- Crazy in Alabama (1999) .... Croupier
- Felicity (TV Series)

- Episode: "The Depths" (1999) .... Loren

- Everything Put Together (2000) .... Dr. Miller
- Roswell (TV Series)

- Episode: "Into the Woods" (2000) .... Rocky Calhoun

- The Huntress (TV Series)

- Episode: "Kidnapped" (2000) .... George

- Grosse Pointe (TV Series)

- Episode: "Prelude to a Kiss" (2000) .... Paul / Crew Guy

- Lost Souls (2000) .... Father Malcolm
- Titus (TV Series)

- Episode: "Locking Up Mom" (2000) .... James

- CSI: Crime Scene Investigation (TV Series)

- Episode: "Anonymous" (2000) .... Walter Bangler

- Diagnosis: Murder (TV Series)

- Episode: "Playing God" (2001) .... Casey Maguire

- JAG (TV Series)

- Episode: "Retreat, Hell" (2001) .... Jim Teasdale

- Angel (TV Series) .... Host's Elder

- Episode: "Through the Looking Glass" (2001)
- Episode: "There's No Place Like Plrtz Glrb" (2001)

- FreakyLinks (TV Series)

- Episode: "Subject: The Final Word" (2001) .... Homeless Man

- Providence (TV Series)

- Episode: "Gobble, Gobble" (2001)

- E! True Hollywood Story (TV Series)

- Episode: Married... with Children (2001) .... Himself

- It's All About You (2002) .... Mr. French
- A Lighter Shade of Pearl (2002) .... Lincoln Quahog
- Charmed (TV Series)

- Episode: "A Witch's Tail, Part 2" (2002) .... Fisherman

- Crossing Jordan (TV Series) .... Charlie the Guard

- Episode: "Pilot" (2001)
- Episode: "Miracles & Wonders" (2002)
- Episode: "Four Fathers" (2002)

- Cradle 2 the Grave (2003) .... Fight Club Fan
- Grand Theft Parsons (2003) .... Polyonax Place Barman
- Navy NCIS: Naval Criminal Investigative Service (TV Series)

- Episode: "My Other Lef"t Foot" (2004) .... Captain Brent Peters

- Envy (2004) .... Bosco
- Girlfriends (TV Series)

- Episode: "When Hearts Attack" (2004) .... Bob

- Million Dollar Baby (2004) .... Lawyer
- ER (TV Series)

- Episode: "Only Connect" (2005) .... Larry

- Bones (TV Series)

- Episode: "The Man in the Morgue" (2006) .... Peter LaSalle (as Thom McLeister)
