= Susan Mosher =

American stage and film actress

Susan Mosher (also known as Susie Mosher) is an American stage, television and film actress. She starred as the Female Authority figure in the Las Vegas run of Hairspray, before joining the Broadway production in 2007. She continued in the comedic role until the show closed January 4, 2009. She portrayed Pepper Cole in the show Cashino.

== Career ==
Mosher's stage debut was in the premiere of Godspell, which ran for over 100 shows. She continued to work regionally before originating the role of Dee Dee in SUDS: The Rocking 60's Musical Soap Opera, which premiered Off-Broadway in 1988. It was her first time performing in New York City.

Mosher starred in the musical revue Back to Bacharach and David in Los Angeles from April 2009 to its close in May 2009. Mosher was in the 2014 stage version of Holiday Inn at the Goodspeed Opera House.

In July 2018, Mosher began hosting The Lineup with Susie Mosher at the historic Birdland nightclub in New York City. The Lineup is a variety show that includes performers from Broadway as well as those in the cabaret and comedy scenes.

On television, Mosher had a recurring role on The L Word.

== Awards ==
- Bistro Award
  - 2022: Variety Show Hosting and Performance
- MAC Awards
  - 2022: recurring series The Lineup with Susie Mosher, and for emcee
  - 2023: recurring series The Lineup with Susie Mosher, and for emcee
