= Holiday Inn (musical) =

Musical based on the 1942 film Holiday Inn

- Original Broadway poster
- Music: Irving Berlin
- Lyrics: Irving Berlin
- Book: Gordon Greenberg; Chad Hodge
- Basis: Holiday Inn by Irving Berlin
- Productions: 2014 Connecticut; 2015 St. Louis; 2016 Broadway

Holiday Inn (also known as Holiday Inn, The New Irving Berlin Musical) is a musical based on the Paramount Pictures 1942 film of the same name. The libretto is by Gordon Greenberg and Chad Hodge, with music and lyrics by Irving Berlin. The musical opened on Broadway in 2016 after premiering at the Goodspeed Opera House in 2014.

== Production history ==
Chris Herzberger, executive at Live Theatricals at Universal Stage Productions, who developed the musical, said that, "I ask, 'Is it a great story, one that will move me, make me laugh or cry? And will it benefit from what is unique about theater, which is the live experience?'" Much of the film score was kept, with several songs omitted, including the minstrel number performed in blackface. The creators also requested songs from the Irving Berlin catalog. Playbill reported that "so many people felt the need for this on Broadway that the show was fast-tracked. (It's been less than three years since Holiday Inn transformed from an idea in a conference room to a Broadway bow.) Having tested the waters in a small house (Goodspeed) and in a huge amphitheater (MUNY), the show finds its middle ground on the Main Stem." Bryce Pinkham said that "We’re doing it because it's a new version, it's been adapted by our contemporaries, and we are providing audiences the chance to reflect on how far we’ve come—considering the style and manners in which the original was made and the differences we’ve chosen to make in ours."

The musical premiered at the Goodspeed Opera House in East Haddam, Connecticut, running from September 19 to December 28, 2014. The show was directed by Gordon Greenberg with choreography by Denis Jones. The cast featured Noah Racey and then Gavin Lee as Ted, Patti Murin as Linda, Susan Mosher as Louise, Tally Sessions as Jim, Danny Rutigliano as Danny and Haley Podschun as Lila. It was next produced at The Muny, in St. Louis, from July 6 through July 12, 2015. Directed by Greenberg, the cast featured Murin, Racey and Rutigliano returning as Linda, Ted and Danny, with Nancy Opel as Louise, Colin Donnell as Jim and Holly Ann Butler as Lila. Murin noted of the new venue: "[T]he Goodspeed is notoriously tiny, a postage stamp. And the Muny is the biggest stage around."

The musical opened on Broadway, produced by the Roundabout Theatre Company, at Studio 54 on October 6, 2016, and closed on January 15, 2017. The musical was directed by Greenberg, with choreography by Jones, scenic design by Anna Louizos, costume design by Alejo Vietti, lighting design by Jeff Croiter, hair and wig design by Charles G. LaPointe, sound design by Keith Caggiano, and music direction by Andy Einhorn. The vocal and dance arrangements were by Sam Davis and Bruce Pomahac, and the orchestrations by Larry Blank.

== Cast and characters ==
Character	Connecticut	St. Louis	Broadway
Character	2014	2015	2016
Jim Hardy	Tally Sessions	Colin Donnell	Bryce Pinkham
Ted Hanover	Noah Racey	Noah Racey	Corbin Bleu
Lila Dixon	Haley Podschun	Holly Ann Butler	Megan Sikora
Danny Reed	Danny Rutigliano	Danny Rutigliano	Lee Wilkof
Charlie Winslow	Noah Marlowe	Phoenix Lawson	Morgan Gao
Linda Mason	Patti Murin	Patti Murin	Lora Lee Gayer
Louise Badger	Susan Mosher	Nancy Opel	Megan Lawrence

== Synopsis ==
=== Act I ===
In August 1946, song-and-dance trio Jim Hardy, Ted Hanover, and Lila Dixon perform at a club in New York City ("Steppin' Out With My Baby/I'll Capture Her Heart"). Afterwards, Jim proposes to Lila. She accepts, and he tells her that he bought Mason Farm in Midville, Connecticut, intending for them to leave show business to raise a family ("The Little Things in Life"). Lila is reluctant to give up performing. When Ted and his manager Danny announce that the trio has booked a six-week tour, Jim rejects the offer, but Lila agrees to tour with Ted as a duo, promising to join Jim in Connecticut after the tour. Eager to settle down, Jim moves to Midville ("Blue Skies").

Jim finds the old farmhouse falling apart, and local boy Charlie Winslow, on behalf of the local bank, presents Jim with a bill for back taxes. Jim is visited by the spirited Linda Mason, an aspiring performer-turned-schoolteacher who had lived on the farm. Linda and Jim are attracted to each other and awkwardly express their shared loneliness and longing to move forward with their lives ("Marching Along With Time"). Linda introduces Jim to Louise Badger, an overly enthusiastic farmhand who has worked at Mason Farm since Linda was a child. Jim and Louise tend to the farm with little success. Jim misses Lila; meanwhile, Ted and Lila have a successful tour ("Heat Wave"). Lila finally visits Jim ("It's A Lovely Day Today"), but she breaks off their engagement; she will continue performing with Ted.

By Thanksgiving, Ted and Lila are in Las Vegas ("Plenty to Be Thankful For"); although Louise tries to push Linda and Jim closer together, the two fail to connect, and Linda laments her loneliness ("Nothing More to Say"). On Christmas Eve, Jim and Louise decorate the farmhouse; he notes the irony of decorating a house for only themselves, but Louise has invited Jim's old performing friends to visit, so they all throw a party ("Shakin' the Blues Away"). Linda arrives and is impressed by the festivities. Jim realizes how much he misses performing. He and Louise decide to turn the farm into an inn – only open on holidays – as a way to satisfy his desire to perform while still living a quiet life most of the year, and to bring in money. Jim will write songs for each holiday, to be performed by him, Linda, and his friends. He plays Linda a Christmas song he wrote as an example of the type of song he might perform at the Inn ("White Christmas"), and he decides to stage the first performance on New Year's Eve.

A week later, "Holiday Inn" is having its inaugural performance, and it proves popular ("Happy Holiday"). To ring in both the new year and Jim's new business, Linda performs publicly for the first time in many years ("Let's Start the New Year Right"). Ted drunkenly wanders into the inn, interrupts the song and begins dancing with her. Jim jealously punches Ted in the face, and Linda storms out.

=== Act II ===
Ted wakes up in Louise's bed, hung over; Lila has left their act to marry a millionaire in Texas; he cannot remember who he danced with before passing out, but he decides she must be his new dance partner. Jim, worried that Ted will steal Linda from him, pretends not to have seen Ted's new partner. Ted sets out to dance with every woman he sees, trying to track down the right one ("You're Easy to Dance With"). Linda is humiliated by Jim and Ted's behavior; Jim apologizes and offers to start over ("Let's Take an Old-Fashioned Walk"). She agrees to give him another chance, and in time they begin a relationship.

By the Valentine's Day show, Jim loves Linda, and he writes a song about her for the Inn ("Be Careful, It's My Heart"). While he sings it to her, Ted walks in and realizes Linda is the girl he seeks. Jim objects that he does not want Ted to steal Linda from him, but Ted and Linda reassure him and perform together for the first time, headlining the performance. Jim jealously tries to prevent Ted and Linda from getting too close to each other, by cuing the band to change style and tempo several times ("Cheek to Cheek"). Jim apologizes for sabotaging the number, but he does so again in the Easter show by entering at the end of the song and singing with Linda and Ted ("Easter Parade"). Ted asks Danny to put an end to Jim's meddling. Danny reveals to Ted that two Hollywood producers are interested in putting Ted and Lila in a movie, and they will attend the next Holiday Inn performance. Louise hears this and calls Lila, asking her to come to the Inn.

As Linda prepares for the Independence Day performance ("Song of Freedom"), Louise locks her in the barn to prevent the producers from seeing her. With Linda missing, Ted improvises a solo tap number with fireworks ("Let's Say It With Firecrackers"). Lila arrives but mistakenly enters the barn where Linda is trapped, and reveals that the man she left Ted for owed millions rather than owning them; not knowing that Linda is Ted's new dance partner, she mentions the producers. Linda assumes Jim has sabotaged her again and leaves Lila locked in the barn, returning to the stage to join Ted for the end of his number. After the performance, Linda confronts Jim, but he has no knowledge of the producers nor of Lila's presence, and Louise admits she orchestrated the sabotage. As Linda forgives Jim, Danny reveals that the producers want to make a movie about Holiday Inn, starring Ted and Linda with Jim as a songwriter and consultant, but Jim wants to stay at the Inn. Linda is hurt by Jim's stoicism and leaves with Ted to make the movie ("Nothing More to Say" (reprise)).

Jim and Louise spend another Thanksgiving alone; with no headliners, they cancel the Holiday Inn shows. Louise motivates the despondent Jim and sends him to win back Linda in Hollywood. On the set of the movie, Linda is having a tough time with the fictionalization of the story, interrupting shots and proving difficult for the director and producers to work with. As she sings "White Christmas," Jim enters the studio and sings with her, halting the production. Jim proposes to Linda and she accepts, quitting the film to be with him. Danny objects, but Ted lets her go. It is early in production, and Linda is replaced by Lila. An excerpt of the finished film is shown. (As an alternative scene, instead of the film excerpt, Lila talks with a reporter at the red-carpet movie premiere.) Later in Midville, Ted and Lila reunite at the wedding of Linda and Jim, who vow to continue performing at the Inn ("Finale").

== Song list ==
Act I

- "Overture" - Orchestra
- "Steppin' Out with My Baby / I'll Capture Her Heart" – Jim, Ted, Lila and Ensemble
- "The Little Things in Life" – Jim
- "Blue Skies" – Jim and Ensemble
- "Marching Along With Time" – Linda and Jim
- "Heat Wave" – Ted, Lila and Ensemble
- "It's a Lovely Day Today" – Jim, Lila and Louise
- "Plenty to Be Thankful For" – Ted, Lila and Ensemble
- "Plenty to Be Thankful For" (reprise) – Linda and Charlie
- "Marching Along With Time" (reprise) – Linda
- "Nothing More to Say" – Linda
- "Shaking the Blues Away" – Louise, Jim and Ensemble
- "White Christmas" – Jim and Linda
- "Holiday Inn / Happy Holiday" – Jim, Louise and Ensemble
- "Let's Start the New Year Right" – Linda and Ensemble

Act II

- "Entr'acte" - Orchestra
- "You're Easy to Dance With" – Ted and Ensemble Women
- "Let's Take an Old-Fashioned Walk" – Jim and Linda
- "Be Careful, It's My Heart" – Jim and Linda
- "Cheek to Cheek" – Ted, Linda and Ensemble
- "Easter Parade" – Jim, Linda, Ted and Ensemble
- "Song of Freedom" – Linda, Ted, Jim and Ensemble
- "Let's Say It With Firecrackers" – Ted and Linda
- "Nothing More to Say" (reprise) – Linda
- "White Christmas" (reprise) – Linda, Jim and Ted
- "Finale" – Full Company

== Critical response ==
Variety said "the 1942 film has gotten a complete and first-class stage redo [...] turning this shaky fixer-upper into prime property. [...] Director Gordon Greenberg and co-writer Chad Hodge have significantly rethought, reshaped and revitalized the script, giving the show more heart, a modern sensibility and a joyful spirit. Engaging performances, dynamic dancing and a lively orchestra make it the feel-good show of the fall." Deadline called it "an endorphin assault, inducing warm-bath pleasure like no other show since 42nd Street. The dancing is spectacular, the singing sublime, the visuals are ingenious".

Charles Isherwood, in his review of the Broadway production for The New York Times, wrote: "All of the performers are skilled singers and actors, filling in the generic contours of their characters with proficient professionalism", and the show "added such Berlin gems as “Blue Skies,” “Cheek to Cheek” and “Heat Wave”. ... The interpolated songs are integrated into the plot smoothly enough, without lifting the show's mild temperature or bringing new definition to the characters. ... As a familiar Broadway exercise in nostalgia – or a familiar Broadway exercise in holiday exploitation – it's polished and pleasant."

Elyse Sommer, reviewing the Broadway production for CurtainUp, wrote that the show is a "trip back to sheer old-fashioned good-time entertainment – especially given Denis Jones's very lively choreography and the excellent designers and performers ... particularly ... the first act's jump rope routines in "Shakin' the Blues Away." The second act's lesser known but crackling "Fire Crackers/"Song of Freedom" is also [a] show stopper."

== Awards and nominations ==
The musical received one 2017 Tony Award nomination, for Best Choreography for Denis Jones. The musical was nominated for the 2017 Drama Desk Award for Outstanding Choreography.
