= Topsy and Bunker: The Cat Killers =

1992 film

- Directed by: Thomas Massengale
- Written by: James Hansen
- Produced by: Jack Massengale
- Starring: Steve Gunderson (actor); Paul Robertson; Quentin Crisp; Kathy Najimy; Shirley Stoler
- Music by: Butch Rovan
- Distributed by: Top Bunk Films
- Release date: April 17, 1992
- Running time: 87 min.
- Language: English
- Budget: $1,000,000 (est.)

Topsy and Bunker: The Cat Killers is a 1992 mystery/drama film released by Top Bunk Films, the first feature film directed by underground cine-video artist Thomas Massengale.

== Synopsis ==
Topsy (Steve Gunderson) and Bunker (Paul Robertson), two outcasts living in a run-down, fleabag hotel in pre-Giuliani New York. Ensconced in their Manhattan neighborhood, where the present seemingly is out of sync with the overarching, socially defined reality of The City at large, the two misfits pass the time of their times in a fugue. Weaving fantasies of ever more complicated deviousness, they are shocked when, one night, one of their mind games goes horribly wrong and results in the death of Grace (Shirley Stoler), one of the locals.

== Cast ==
- Quentin Crisp as Pat the Doorman
- Steve Gunderson as Topsy
- Kathy Najimy as Marge
- Paul Robertson as Bunker
- Shirley Stoler as Grace
