= Steve Gunderson (actor) =

American actor and performing arts professional

Steve Gunderson is an American actor, singer, composer, arranger and playwright. As an actor, he has appeared off-Broadway, with regional theatre companies, and on film. As a composer, arranger and/or playwright, his works include Suds: The Rockin’ 60s Musical Soap Opera, Back to Bacharach and David, Dixie Highway, an adaptation of A Christmas Carol, and music for the TV series Romancing America.

== Career ==
Gunderson made his off-Broadway debut as Daniel Buchanan in Kurt Weill's Street Scene with the Equity Library Theatre in 1982. In 1983 he performed in the off-Broadway musical revue I'll Die If I Can't Live Forever by Joyce Stoner, and in 1987 he portrayed Joseph Keyston in Simon Gray's play Butley at The Courtyard Playhouse (39 Grove Street, New York, NY). In 1991 he portrayed Sparky in Forever Plaid at the Triad Theatre.

Gunderson co-created an original cabaret show with actress Melinda Gilb titled The Melinda and Steve Show, for which he arranged extant musical material by other composers and wrote original music. The duo performed the work periodically at the Manhattan cabaret restaurant Don't Tell Mama in 1984, 1985, and 1986 among other venues. Cabaret critic Bob Harrington wrote the following in his Back Stage review:

Melinda Gilb and Steve Gunderson exhibit a very limited range: from very funny to outrageously funny as comics, and from interesting to exciting as musicians! And if you are going to have limits, these are ones to have. Their broad zany behavior neatly underscores some magnificent arrangements by Gunderson, and both he and Gilb have the voices to carry them off.

Gunderson and Gilb collaborated again to create the musical parody Suds: The Rockin’ 60s Musical Soap Opera together with Bryan Scott. The three co-authored the musical's book, and wrote spoof lyrics to 1960s popular songs, with arrangements by Gunderson. The work was commissioned by the San Diego Repertory Theatre (SDRT) after one of the SDRT staff saw Gunderson and Gilb's cabaret show in New York. It premiered there in October 1987. Well received by San Diego audiences, it was revived just a few months later at the Old Globe Theatre in San Diego. The production moved off-Broadway at the Criterion Theatre where it ran from September 25 through December 4, 1988.

== 1990s and later ==
In January and February 1992 Gunderson returned to San Diego to portray Peter in Wendy Wasserstein's The Heidi Chronicles at the Hahn Cosmopolitan Theatre. Later that year, he co-created and starred in another original cabaret revue, Back to Bacharach and David, which featured music by Burt Bacharach and Hal David, arranged by Gunderson. The revue's script was written by Gunderson and Kathy Najimy, who directed the revue. He and Najimy also appeared together in the film Topsy and Bunker: The Cat Killers (1992).

In 1993 Gunderson created and starred in another musical revue, "24 Hours From Tulsa", co-starring Lillias White. Gunderson's other stage works include the musical Dixie Highway (1994) and a musical adaptation of A Christmas Carol (1994), both for the San Diego Repertory Theatre.

== Filmography ==
Actor

- 29th and Gay (2005) .... Rico
- Ca$hino (2001) .... Lonely Guy
- Topsy and Bunker: The Cat Killers (1992) .... Topsy
- The Equalizer (TV).... Man in Bar (1 episode, 1985)

Composer

- Romancing America (1997) TV Series
