= Leonard Kastle =

American composer, librettist and director (1929–2011)

Leonard Gregory Kastle (February 11, 1929 – May 18, 2011) was an American opera composer, librettist, and director, although he is best known as the writer/director of the 1970 film The Honeymoon Killers, his only venture into the cinema, for which he did all his own research. He was an adjunct member of the SUNY Albany music faculty.

Following his high school education in Mount Vernon, New York, Kastle began his musical training at the Juilliard School of Music (1938–40). From 1940 to 1942, he attended the Mannes School of Music and later studied composition at the Curtis Institute of Music in Philadelphia (1944–50), earning a B.A. in 1950. While at the Curtis Institute, he held scholarships in composition with Rosario Scalero, Gian-Carlo Menotti and Samuel Barber, and a piano scholarship with Isabelle Vengerova. He attended Columbia University from 1947 to 1950.

In 1956, Kastle composed a thirteen-minute "made-to-measure" opera, titled The Swing, for two singers, a speaking part, and piano accompaniment. It was commissioned by and broadcast on the NBC television network on Sunday, June 10, 1956, at noon. He also wrote The Pariahs, about the sinking of the whaler Essex, a trilogy of operas about the Shakers known under the collective title The Passion of Mother Ann: A Sacred Festival Play, a children's opera called Professor Lookalike and the Children, a piano concerto, sonatas for piano and violin, and three unproduced screenplays, Wedding at Cana, Change of Heart, and Shakespeare's Dog.

In a 2003 interview for the Criterion Collection, he said that no producer wanted Wedding at Cana, just another Honeymoon Killers, which he did not want to do. After The Honeymoon Killers, Kastle returned to teaching and composing. After the Criterion release of the film, he was rediscovered by a new generation of cult film enthusiasts and occasionally attended film-related events such as the Ed Wood Film Festival in 2007, where he served on the panel of judges

Kastle died May 18, 2011, at his home in Westerlo, New York, at the age of 82.
