= Firing Line (TV program) =

American public affairs television show

- Title screen from the first season of Firing Line
- Also known as: Firing Line with William F. Buckley Jr. Firing Line with Margaret Hoover
- Genre: Talk show
- Directed by: Warren Steibel
- Presented by: William F. Buckley Jr. Margaret Hoover
- Theme music composer: Johann Sebastian Bach
- Opening theme: Brandenburg Concerto No. 2 in F Major, Third Movement (Allegro assai)
- Country of origin: United States
- Original language: English
- No. of seasons: 34 (first incarnation)
- No. of episodes: 1,504 (first incarnation) (list of episodes)

Production
- Running time: 60 minutes (1966–1988); 30 minutes (1988–1999, 2018–present); 120 minutes (debate specials: 1978–1999)
- Production companies: WOR-TV (1966–1971); SCETV (1971–1999); WNET (2018–present)

Original release
- Network: First-run syndication (1966–1971); PBS (1971–1999, 2018–present)
- Release: April 4, 1966 – December 26, 1999
- Release: June 22, 2018 – present

Firing Line is an American public affairs television show. It first ran from 1966 to 1999, with conservative author and columnist William F. Buckley Jr. as host. It was relaunched in 2018 with Margaret Hoover as host.

With 1,504 episodes over 33 years under Buckley, Firing Line was the longest-running public affairs show with a single host in television history. The program featured many influential public figures in the United States and won an Emmy Award in 1969.

== Broadcast history ==
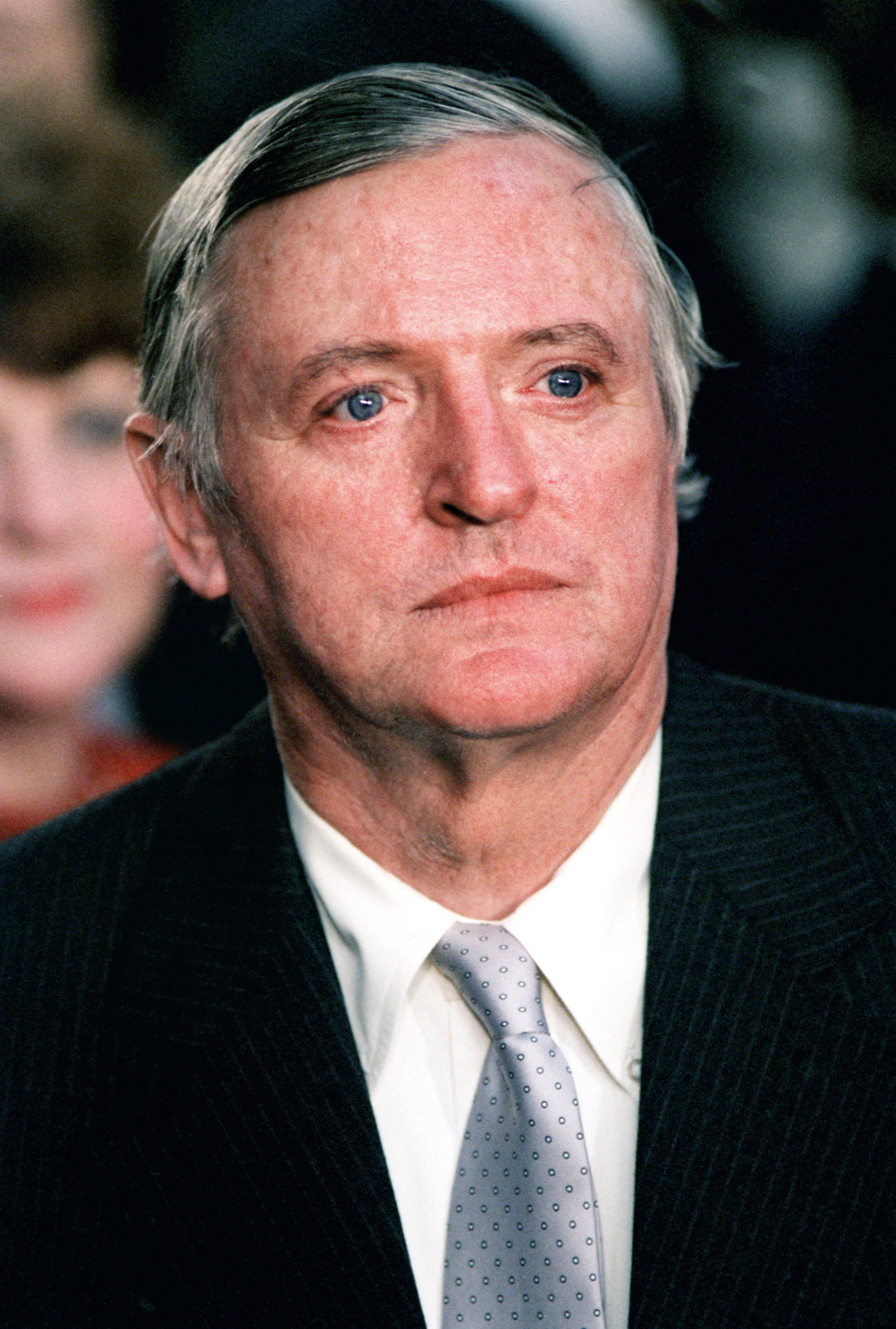
Original host Buckley in 1985

Firing Line began on April 4, 1966, as an hour-long show (including breaks) for commercial television. The program was produced at WOR-TV in New York City and was syndicated nationally through that station's parent company RKO General and later Show Corporation of America, a syndication firm which RKO acquired majority ownership of in 1968.

Firing Line was mainly seen on weekends in low-rated afternoon or late-night time slots, because of the program's admitted appeal to a small, "middle-brow" demographic group. The first 39 episodes of the series were taped in black-and-white; the series was converted to color in January 1967.

In the fall of 1966, Firing Line began to appear on noncommercial educational television stations, mostly in areas where RKO General found it difficult to sell the program to a commercial outlet. After 240 episodes aired in commercial syndication Firing Line moved exclusively to noncommercial television in May 1971, distributed by the Public Broadcasting Service (PBS) and produced under the auspices of the Southern Educational Communications Association, an arm of South Carolina Educational Television.

This was somewhat unusual, given the reputation among many conservatives that PBS unfairly discriminated against non-liberal viewpoints in its other programming. SECA/SCETV, however, was one of the very few public broadcasting entities of the time that was sympathetic to the conservative movement.

Because the program received a relatively unfavorable Sunday evening timeslot on PBS' schedule in the early 1970s, Buckley and long-time director Warren Steibel briefly attempted to return Firing Line to commercial TV, but could not find sponsors. Thus, the program would remain on PBS until Buckley and Steibel discontinued production on December 17, 1999, with Buckley's final episode airing December 26, 1999.

In April 2018, PBS announced that it would begin airing a new Firing Line, hosted by Margaret Hoover.

== Buckley tenure ==
=== Show format ===
Although the program's format varied over the years, it typically featured Buckley interviewing, and exchanging views with a guest, while seated together in front of a small studio audience. Standing or sitting further away in the studio, an "examiner", typically a liberal, would ask questions, generally toward the end of the show. Most guests were intellectuals or those in positions of power, being notable in the fields of politics, religion, literature and academia. Their views could either sharply contrast or be in strong agreement with Buckley's.

Reflecting Buckley's talents and preferences, the exchange of views was almost always polite, and the guests were given time to answer questions at length, giving the program a leisurely pace. "The show was devoted to a leisurely examination of issues and ideas at an extremely high level", according to Jeff Greenfield, who frequently appeared as an examiner. John Kenneth Galbraith said of the program, "Firing Line is one of the rare occasions when you have a chance to correct the errors of the man who's interrogating you."

The show might be compared in politeness and style of discourse to other national public interview shows, specifically those hosted by Richard Heffner, Charlie Rose or Terry Gross, but Buckley was clearly interested in debate.

In a 1999 Salon.com article, The Weekly Standard editor William Kristol summarized Buckley's approach to the show: "Buckley really believes that in order to convince, you have to debate and not just preach, which of course means risking the possibility that someone will beat you in debate." Buckley was not averse to asking tough questions of friendly guests either, according to Tom Wolfe, who recalled the interviewer asking him whether there were really any original insights in his book The Bonfire of the Vanities.

Buckley and his producer, Warren Steibel, used various methods over the years to bring extra perspectives to the show. In the early years, there would often be a panel of questioners. In 1977, the panel was replaced by an "examiner" who played a larger part in the proceedings. Examiners varied, with Jeff Greenfield, Michael Kinsley, Harriet Pilpel, and Mark Green appearing most frequently.

When the show was shortened to 30 minutes in 1988, the role of examiner was eliminated; however, there was often a moderator whose role was similar to that of the moderator in a formal debate. The moderator would introduce both host and guest, and then ask the opening question.

Starting in 1978, scattered among the regular broadcasts were occasional specials and two-hour formal debates, with opening statements, cross-examination, and closing statements. In 1988, at Buckley's request, the running time of regular program shows was reduced from one hour to a half-hour.

Beginning in March 1993, the two-hour formal debates would often be followed by half-hour shows in which most or all of the participants engaged in informal discussion. In the 1980s and 1990s, the debate episodes were frequently broadcast on the Monday evenings after PBS pledge drives concluded.

A recurring episode that Buckley had rebroadcast every Christmas, beginning in 1981, was an interview he did with Malcolm Muggeridge at his home in Sussex, England. The title of the episode was "How Does One Find Faith?" The episode deals with questions that are religious and spiritual in nature.

=== Buckley's persona ===
Buckley's distinctive mannerisms were prominently displayed by the program and were part of the public images of both the show and Buckley. Buckley was frequently seen leaning far back in his chair, a pen near his mouth and a clipboard in hand. His flicking tongue, widening eyes, and flashing smile also characterized his style, as did his multi-syllabic vocabulary. Buckley's voice was widely satirized, for instance by Robin Williams on Saturday Night Live, and in the animated movie Aladdin.

At the same time the guests were treated politely, Buckley might gently mock them, particularly if he was friendly with them, as with John Kenneth Galbraith or examiner Mark Green. "You've been on the show close to 100 times over the years", Buckley once asked Green. "Tell me, Mark, have you learned anything yet?"

When Allen Ginsberg asked if he could sing a song in praise of Krishna, Buckley acceded and the poet chanted "Hare Krishna" repeatedly as he played dolefully on a harmonium. According to Richard Brookhiser, an associate of Buckley's, the host commented that it was "the most unharried Krishna I've ever heard".

Buckley usually addressed his guests by their title or otherwise as "Mr" or "Mrs". Buckley's celebrated politeness sometimes wore thin: In a 1969 debate with linguist and political activist Noam Chomsky, Buckley said, "I rejoice in your disposition to argue the Vietnam question, especially when I recognize what an act of self-control this must involve."

Chomsky acknowledged, "Sometimes I lose my temper. Maybe not tonight." "Maybe not tonight", Buckley said, "because if you would I'd smash you in the goddamn face." (This comment was a joking throwback to Buckley's famous response to Gore Vidal, when, during another Vietnam debate, Vidal called Buckley a "crypto-Nazi".)

For the show's 15th anniversary in 1981, Senator Daniel Patrick Moynihan, Vernon Jordan, Henry Kissinger, and Louis Auchincloss presided over a party for Buckley at the New York Yacht Club.

=== Guests ===
Prominent guests on the program included:

- Politicians and statesmen: Jimmy Carter, Richard Nixon, Henry Kissinger, John Vorster, Chiang Ching-Kuo, Harold Macmillan, Gerald Ford, Ronald Reagan, Margaret Thatcher, Enoch Powell, Ron Paul, George Wallace, Ian Smith, Jesse Jackson, Newt Gingrich, Daniel Patrick Moynihan, Barry Goldwater, Clare Boothe Luce, John Kerry, George H. W. Bush, Michael Foot, Benjamin Netanyahu
- Political activists: Saul Alinsky, Allen Ginsberg, Julian Bond, Timothy Leary, Allard K. Lowenstein, Huey Newton, Madalyn Murray O'Hair, Frank Donatelli, Phyllis Schlafly
- Academics: Noam Chomsky, B. F. Skinner, Mortimer Adler, Allan Bloom, Arthur Schlesinger Jr., Zbigniew K. Brzezinski, Benjamin Spock, Paul Goodman, Germaine Greer
- Journalists: Carl Bernstein, Bob Woodward, Bernard Levin, Malcolm Muggeridge, Robert Kuttner
- Economists: John Kenneth Galbraith, Milton Friedman, Friedrich Hayek, Thomas Sowell
- Writers: Christopher Hitchens, Jorge Luis Borges, Tom Wolfe, Norman Mailer, Jack Kerouac, Walker Percy, Anthony Burgess, Truman Capote, Mark Lane, June Jordan, Ann Coulter, Mary McCarthy
- Religious figures: Billy Graham, Richard John Neuhaus, William Sloane Coffin, Mother Teresa, Dalai Lama, Fulton J. Sheen
- Television and film personalities: Steve Allen, Charlton Heston, Theodore Bikel, Groucho Marx, Godfrey Cambridge
- Others: Muhammad Ali, Hugh Hefner, Billy Taylor, Bernadette Devlin, Dwight Macdonald, William Shockley, Richard Vatz, R. Emmett Tyrrell Jr., Rush Limbaugh, Rosalyn Tureck

== Hoover tenure ==
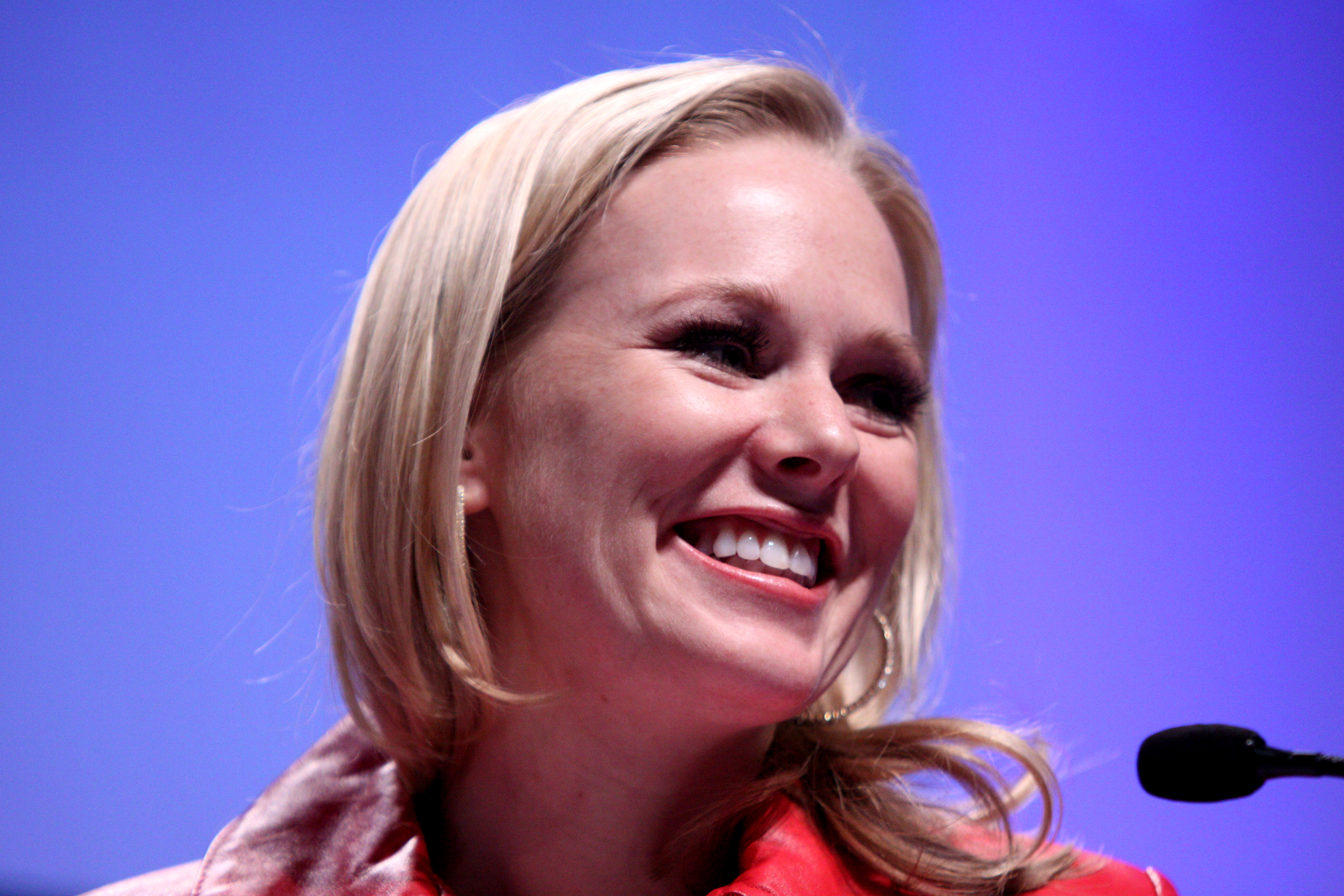
Hoover (pictured in 2011) became host in 2018.

=== Revival ===
Margaret Hoover hosts the Firing Line reboot on PBS. The show premiered on June 2, 2018, on WNET, which serves the New York metropolitan area, and is the largest PBS market in the country. The show maintains the original format of deep exchange of ideas with a single guest on a single issue within its 26-minute runtime. It is produced weekly at the WNET Tisch Studios.

=== Episodes ===
The first fourteen episodes of the program featured guests representing a variety of sociopolitical ideologies, including Speaker of the House Paul Ryan, Ohio Governor John Kasich, journalist Gretchen Carlson, Senator Jeff Merkley, "the rising star of the political Left", Alexandria Ocasio-Cortez, and "accidental icon of the conservative movement", Jordan Peterson. Margaret Hoover's interview with Alexandria Ocasio-Cortez earned national and international attention for the latter's comments ranging from the state of capitalism and the unemployment rate in the United States to the State of Israel, which earned Ocasio-Cortez derision at the time. The former governor of New Jersey Chris Christie was interviewed in which he referred to the crimes that Jared Kushner's father committed as "loathsome". Senator Tom Cotton of Arkansas declared in his interview that the U.S. could defeat Iran with, "two strikes. The first strike and the last strike."

=== Reception ===
The New York Times wrote that, "Under Ms. Hoover's direction, the discourse is civil and substantive." A review of the show by the National Review states, "the reincarnation of Firing Line comes at an interesting time, and a needful one." In the run-up to the show's television premiere Politico said, "It seems like a great idea, so let's test drive it and see what happens." CNN anchor Poppy Harlow stated that Firing Line with Margaret Hoover "is appointment television in my house" on CNN Newsroom. Hoover has made multiple television appearances for the Firing Line reboot, including ones on Good Morning America, The Late Show with Stephen Colbert, and Real Time with Bill Maher.

In May 2019 Hoover was awarded Journalist of the Year by the Algemeiner Journal for her work as host.

=== Guests ===
- Stacey Abrams
- Tim Alberta
- Ayaan Hirsi Ali
- José Andrés
- Steve Bannon
- Tony Blair
- Michael Bloomberg
- Max Boot
- Gretchen Carlson
- Chris Christie
- Tom Cotton
- Ann Coulter
- Ted Cruz
- Richard Dreyfuss
- Tulsi Gabbard
- John Hickenlooper
- John Kasich
- Jewel Kilcher
- Tamika Mallory
- Jim Mattis
- Andrew McCabe
- DeRay Mckesson
- Jeff Merkley
- Michael Moore
- Peter Navarro
- Oliver North
- Bill Nye
- Alexandria Ocasio-Cortez
- Sean Penn
- Jordan Peterson
- Paul Ryan
- Adam Schiff
- Elise Stefanik
- Jeff Weaver
- Randi Weingarten
- Andrew Yang
- Andrew Cuomo

== Theme music ==
Beginning with the move of the program to public television in 1971, the theme music of Firing Line was the Brandenburg Concerto No. 2 in F Major, Third Movement (Allegro assai), by Johann Sebastian Bach.

== Release ==
A number of episodes of the show have been released on DVD by the Hoover Institution Library and Archives at Stanford University, and are sold exclusively through Amazon.com, which also makes episodes accessible via Amazon Video. For a slightly higher price, the Hoover Archive supplies unreleased episodes on DVD through its website. Episodes with playlists by year are now available on YouTube.

Digitized audiovisual recordings and transcripts of more than 1,500 Firing Line episodes were contributed to the American Archive of Public Broadcasting via external links from the Hoover Institution Library and Archives at Stanford University.
